= 1st Manitoba Legislature =

- Mar. 15, 1871 – Dec. 16, 1874

Parliament leaders
- Premier: Alfred Boyd; September 1870 - December 1871
- Marc-Amable Girard; December 1871 - March 1872
- Henry Joseph Clarke; March 1872 - July 1874
- Leader of the Opposition: Edward Hay; 1871-1874

Party caucuses
- Government: Non-partisan

Legislative Assembly
- Speaker of the Assembly: Joseph Royal; 1871 - 1872
- Curtis James Bird; 1873
- Members: 24 MLA seats

Legislative Council
- Speaker of the Council: James McKay; Mar. 15, 1871 – Jul. 22, 1874
- Counsellors: 7 counsellor seats

Sovereign
- Monarch: Queen Victoria; 20 June 1837 – 22 January 1901
- Lieutenant governor: Adams George Archibald; May. 20, 1870 – Dec. 2, 1872
- Alexander Morris; Dec. 2, 1872 – Oct. 7, 1877

Sessions
- 1st session March 15, 1871 – May 3, 1871
- 2nd session January 16, 1872 – February 21, 1872
- 3rd session February 3, 1873 – July 22, 1873
- 4th session November 4, 1873 – July 22, 1874
→ 2nd

The members of the 1st Manitoba Legislature were elected in the Manitoba general election held in December 1870, the first general election for the new province. The legislature sat from March 15, 1871, to December 16, 1874.

Lieutenant Governor Adams George Archibald's "Government party" held the balance of power in the assembly with 17 seats. The Canadian Party, also known as the "Loyal party", led by John Christian Schultz, won 5 seats; they demanded swift punishment for the leaders of the Red River Rebellion. Henry Joseph Clarke served as government house leader in the assembly but Lieutenant Governor Archibald performed the functions of Premier. In December 1872, Alexander Morris replaced Archibald as Lieutenant Governor of Manitoba.

In July 1874, a government led by Henry Joseph Clarke was defeated by a motion of non-confidence. Marc-Amable Girard was asked to form a government and was allowed to select the members of his cabinet, thus introducing responsible government to the province. On December 1, 1874, all but one member of the Girard cabinet resigned due to ethnic tensions. Robert Atkinson Davis was asked to form a new government which went to the polls later that month.

Joseph Royal served as speaker for the assembly from 1871 to 1872. Curtis James Bird was speaker from 1873 to 1874.

There were four sessions of the 1st Legislature:

Session	Start	End
1st	March 15, 1871	May 3, 1871
2nd	January 16, 1872	February 21, 1872
3rd	February 3, 1873	July 22, 1873
4th	November 4, 1873	July 22, 1874

== Members of the Assembly ==
The following members were elected to the assembly in 1870:

Member	Electoral district	Affiliation	First elected	No.# of term(s)	Notes
Joseph Dubuc	Baie St. Paul	Government	1870	1st term	
John Taylor (Note: Taylor's election was later overturned and Government supporter James Cunningham was declared elected)	Headingly	Opposition	1870	1st term	
James Cunningham	Headingly	Government	1871	1st term	
John Norquay	High Bluff	Government	1870	1st term	
John Sutherland	Kildonan	Opposition	1870	1st term	
Angus McKay	Lake Manitoba	Government	1870	1st term	
David Spence	Poplar Point	Government	1870	1st term	
Frederick Bird	Portage la Prairie	Opposition	1870	1st term	
Alfred Boyd	St. Andrews North	Government	1870	1st term	
Edward Hay	St. Andrews South	Opposition	1870	1st term	
Marc-Amable Girard	St. Boniface East	Government	1870	1st term	
Louis Schmidt	St. Boniface West	Government	1870	1st term	
Henry Joseph Clarke	St. Charles	Government	1870	1st term	
Thomas Bunn	St. Clements	Independent	1870	1st term	
Pascal Breland	St. Francois Xavier East	Government	1870	1st term	
Joseph Royal	St. Francois Xavier West	Government	1870	1st term	
Edwin Bourke	St. James	Opposition	1870	1st term	
Joseph Lemay	St. Norbert North	Government	1870	1st term	
Pierre Delorme	St. Norbert South	Government	1870	1st term	
Curtis Bird	St. Pauls	Government	1870	1st term	
Thomas Howard	St Peters	Government	1870	1st term	
André Beauchemin	St. Vital	Government	1870	1st term	
George Klyne	Ste. Agathe	Independent	1870	1st term	
John McTavish	Ste. Anne	Government	1870	1st term	
Donald Alexander Smith (Note: Smith was forced to resign when serving in both provincial and federal legislatures became illegal in May 1873)	Winnipeg and St. John	Government	1870	1st term	
Robert Atkinson Davis (1874)	Winnipeg and St. John	Opposition	1874	1st term	

== By-elections ==
By-elections were held to replace members for various reasons:

Electoral district	Member elected	Affiliation	Election date	Reason
Winnipeg and St. John	Robert Atkinson Davis	Opposition	April 1874	DA Smith resigned after dual representation abolished
