= List of premiers of Manitoba =

The Canadian province of Manitoba was created in 1870. Manitoba has a unicameral Westminster-style parliamentary government, in which the premier is the leader of the party that controls the most seats in the Legislative Assembly. The premier is Manitoba's head of government, and the King of Canada is its head of state and is represented by the Lieutenant Governor of Manitoba. The premier picks a cabinet from the elected members to form the Executive Council of Manitoba, and then presides over that body.

Members are first elected to the legislature during general elections. General elections must be conducted every four years from the date of the last election, but the premier may ask for early dissolution of the Legislative Assembly. An election may also happen if the governing party loses the confidence of the legislature by the defeat of a supply bill or tabling of a confidence motion.

Before 1888, Manitoba had no formal party system; premiers were officially non-partisan and were chosen by elected members of the Legislative Assembly from among themselves.

Manitoba has had 24 individuals serve as premier since the province was formed, of which six were non-partisan, nine were Progressive Conservatives, four were Liberals, five were New Democrats and one was Progressive. However, during the early years of the province, the leading minister in the legislature was designated provincial secretary and the government was de facto led by the Lieutenant Governor of Manitoba; it was not until 1874 that responsible government was introduced and the title of "premier" used. The early provincial secretaries, as the most prominent elected officials in the province, are retroactively counted as premiers in modern sources.

This article only covers the time since the province was created in 1870. Before that, the territory was part of the District of Assiniboia in Rupert's Land, and was loosely controlled by the Hudson's Bay Company.

Wab Kinew is the incumbent premier, since October 2023.

On December 7, 2023, Louis Riel was granted the honorary title of "First Premier of Manitoba" after the Louis Riel Act received royal assent. As it is an honorary title, however, Alfred Boyd remains the official first premier of the province.

== Premiers of Manitoba ==
No.	Portrait	Name (Birth–Death)	Term of office	Electoral mandates (Assembly)	Political party	Parliamentary seat	Ref.
Chief Ministers of Manitoba
1		Alfred Boyd (1835–1908)	16 September 1870 – 14 December 1871	Title created (caretaker government) 1870 election (1st Leg.)	Non-partisan	MLA for St. Andrews North	
1		Alfred Boyd (1835–1908)	Officially titled as the Provincial Secretary of Manitoba until January 1871 and Minister of Public Works and Agriculture until December. In practice, Lieutenant Governor Adams Archibald acted as head of the executive branch of government.				
2 (1 of 2)		Marc-Amable Girard (1822–1892)	14 December 1871 – 14 March 1872	Appointment (1st Leg.)	Non-partisan	MLA for St. Boniface East	
2 (1 of 2)		Marc-Amable Girard (1822–1892)	Officially titled as the Provincial Treasurer during the time he is credited as being chief minister. In practice, Lieutenant Governor Adams Archibald acted as head of the executive branch of government.				
3		Henry Joseph Clarke (1833–1889)	14 March 1872 – 8 July 1874	Appointment (1st Leg.)	Non-partisan	MLA for St. Charles	
3		Henry Joseph Clarke (1833–1889)	Officially titled as Attorney-General during the time he is credited as being chief minister. In practice, Lieutenant Governor Adams Archibald acted as head of the executive branch of government.				
Premiers of Manitoba
— (2 of 2)		Marc-Amable Girard (1822–1892)	8 July 1874 – 2 December 1874	Appointment (1st Leg.)	Non-partisan	MLA for St. Boniface East	
4		Robert Atkinson Davis (1841–1903)	3 December 1874 – 16 October 1878	Appointment (1st Leg.) 1874 election (2nd Leg.)	Non-partisan	MLA for Winnipeg and St. John (1874) MLA for Winnipeg (1874-1878)	
5		John Norquay (1841–1889)	16 October 1878 – 24 December 1887	Appointment (2nd Leg.) 1878 election (3rd Leg.) 1879 election (4th Leg.) 1883 election (5th Leg.) 1886 election (6th Leg.)	Non-partisan	MLA for St. Andrews South (1878-1879) MLA for St. Andrews (1879-1887)	
6		David Howard Harrison (1843–1905)	26 December 1887 – 19 January 1888	Appointment (6th Leg.)	Non-partisan	MLA for Minnedosa West	
7		Thomas Greenway (1838–1908)	19 January 1888 – 6 January 1900	Appointment (6th Leg.) 1888 election (7th Leg.) 1892 election (8th Leg.) 1896 election (9th Leg.)	Liberal	MLA for Mountain	
8		Hugh John Macdonald (1850–1929)	10 January 1900 – 29 October 1900	1899 election (10th Leg.)	Conservative	MLA for Winnipeg South	
9		Rodmond Roblin (1853–1937)	29 October 1900 – 12 May 1915	Appointment (10th Leg.) 1903 election (11th Leg.) 1907 election (12th Leg.) 1910 election (13th Leg.) 1914 election (14th Leg.)	Conservative	MLA for Woodlands (1900-1903) MLA for Dufferin (1903-1915)	
10		Tobias Norris (1861–1936)	12 May 1915 – 8 August 1922	Appointment (14th Leg.) 1915 election (15th Leg.) 1920 election (16th Leg.)	Liberal	MLA for Lansdowne	
11		John Bracken (1883–1969)	8 August 1922 – 14 January 1943	1922 election (17th Leg.) 1927 election (18th Leg.) 1932 election (19th Leg.) 1936 election (20th Leg.) 1941 election (21st Leg.)	Progressive	MLA for The Pas	
12		Stuart Garson (1898–1977)	14 January 1943 – 13 November 1948	Appointment (21st Leg.) 1945 election (22nd Leg.)	Liberal–Progressive	MLA for Fairford	
13		Douglas Lloyd Campbell (1895–1995)	13 November 1948 – 30 June 1958	Appointment (22nd Leg.) 1949 election (23rd Leg.) 1953 election (24th Leg.)	Liberal–Progressive	MLA for Lakeside	
14		Dufferin Roblin (1917–2010)	30 June 1958 – 27 November 1967	1958 election (25th Leg.) 1959 election (26th Leg.) 1962 election (27th Leg.) 1966 election (28th Leg.)	Progressive Conservative (Ldr. 1954)	MLA for Wolseley	
15		Walter Weir (1929–1985)	27 November 1967 – 15 July 1969	Appointment (28th Leg.)	Progressive Conservative (Ldr. 1967)	MLA for Minnedosa	
16		Edward Schreyer (b. 1935)	15 July 1969 – 24 October 1977	1969 election (29th Leg.) 1973 election (30th Leg.)	New Democratic (Ldr. 1969)	MLA for Rossmere	
17		Sterling Lyon (1927–2010)	24 October 1977 – 30 November 1981	1977 election (31st Leg.)	Progressive Conservative (Ldr. 1975)	MLA for Charleswood	
18		Howard Pawley (1934–2015)	30 November 1981 – 9 May 1988	1981 election (32nd Leg.) 1986 election (33rd Leg.)	New Democratic (Ldr. 1979)	MLA for Selkirk	
19		Gary Filmon (b. 1942)	9 May 1988 – 5 October 1999	1988 election (34th Leg.) 1990 election (35th Leg.) 1995 election (36th Leg.)	Progressive Conservative (Ldr. 1983)	MLA for Tuxedo	
20		Gary Doer (b. 1948)	5 October 1999 – 19 October 2009	1999 election (37th Leg.) 2003 election (38th Leg.) 2007 election (39th Leg.)	New Democratic (Ldr. 1988)	MLA for Concordia	
21		Greg Selinger (b. 1951)	19 October 2009 – 3 May 2016	Appointment (39th Leg.) 2011 election (40th Leg.)	New Democratic (Ldr. 2009, 2015)	MLA for St. Boniface	
22		Brian Pallister (b. 1954)	3 May 2016 – 1 September 2021	2016 election (41st Leg.) 2019 election (42nd Leg.)	Progressive Conservative (Ldr. 2012 acclamation)	MLA for Fort Whyte	
23		Kelvin Goertzen (b. 1969)	1 September 2021 – 2 November 2021	Appointment (42nd Leg.)	Progressive Conservative (Ldr. 2021 interim appointment)	MLA for Steinbach	
24		Heather Stefanson (b. 1970)	2 November 2021 – 18 October 2023	Appointment (42nd Leg.)	Progressive Conservative (Ldr. 2021)	MLA for Tuxedo	
25		Wab Kinew (b. 1981)	18 October 2023 – incumbent	2023 election (43rd Leg.)	New Democratic (Ldr. 2017)	MLA for Fort Rouge	

== List of premiers by time in office ==
Rank	Premier	Incumbency	Terms of office		Mandates	Party	Ref.
1	John Bracken	20 years, 159 days	August 8, 1922	January 14, 1943	5 (Note: Includes the 1922 election won by the leaderless Progressives who asked Bracken to lead their government after the election.)	█ Progressive	
2	Rodmond Roblin	14 years, 195 days	October 29, 1900	May 12, 1915	4	█ Conservative	
3	Thomas Greenway	11 years, 352 days	January 19, 1888	January 6, 1900	3	█ Liberal	
4	Gary Filmon	11 years, 149 days	May 9, 1988	October 5, 1999	3	█ Progressive Conservative	
5	Gary Doer	10 years, 14 days	October 5, 1999	October 19, 2009	3	█ New Democratic	
6	Douglas Lloyd Campbell	9 years, 229 days	November 13, 1948	June 30, 1958	2	█ Liberal–Progressive	
7	Dufferin Roblin	9 years, 150 days	June 30, 1958	November 27, 1967	4	█ Progressive Conservative	
8	John Norquay	9 years, 69 days	October 16, 1878	December 24, 1887	4	█ Independent	
9	Edward Schreyer	8 years, 101 days	July 15, 1969	October 24, 1977	2	█ New Democratic	
10	Tobias Norris	7 years, 88 days	May 12, 1915	August 8, 1922	2	█ Liberal	
11	Greg Selinger	6 years, 197 days	October 19, 2009	May 3, 2016	1	█ New Democratic	
12	Howard Pawley	6 years, 161 days	November 30, 1981	May 9, 1988	2	█ New Democratic	
13	Stuart Garson	5 years, 304 days	January 14, 1943	November 13, 1948	1	█ Liberal–Progressive	
14	Brian Pallister	5 years, 121 days	May 3, 2016	September 1, 2021	2	█ Conservative	
15	Sterling Lyon	4 years, 24 days	October 24, 1977	November 17, 1981	1	█ Conservative	
16	Robert Atkinson Davis	3 years, 317 days	December 3, 1874	October 16, 1878	1	█ Independent	
17	Wab Kinew (incumbent)	3 years, 0 days	October 18, 2023	Incumbent	1	█ New Democratic	
18	Henry Joseph Clarke	2 years, 116 days	March 14, 1872	July 8, 1874	0	█ Independent	
19	Heather Stefanson	1 year, 350 days	November 2, 2021	October 18, 2023	0	█ Conservative	
20	Walter Weir	1 year, 230 days	November 27, 1967	July 15, 1969	0	█ Conservative	
21	Alfred Boyd	1 year, 89 days	September 16, 1870	December 14, 1871	1	█ Independent	
22	Hugh John Macdonald	292 days	January 10, 1900	October 29, 1900	1	█ Conservative	
23	Marc-Amable Girard	91 days	December 14, 1871	March 14, 1872	0	█ Independent	
24	Kelvin Goertzen	62 days	September 1, 2021	November 2, 2021	0	█ Progressive Conservative	
25	David Howard Harrison	24 days	December 26, 1887	January 19, 1888	0	█ Independent	

== See also ==
- Premier of Manitoba
- List of premiers of Manitoba by time in office
- Leader of the Opposition (Manitoba)
