= 1870 Manitoba general election =

- December 27, 1870
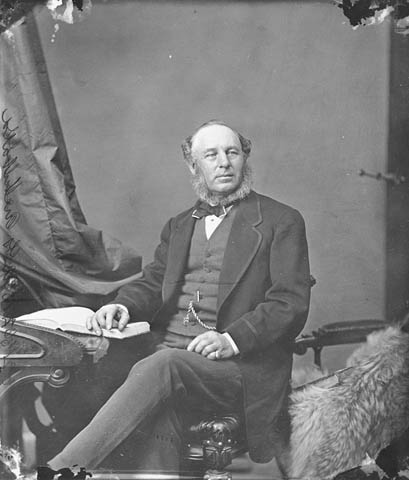

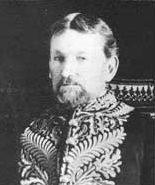
	First party	Second party
Leader	Adams George Archibald	John Christian Schultz
Party	Consensus Government	Canadian Party
Seats won	17	5

The 1870 Manitoba general election held on December 27, 1870, resulted in a victory for Lieutenant Governor Adams George Archibald's governing coalition. Archibald had previously been appointed as the province's Lieutenant Governor by George-Étienne Cartier, and promoted a model of "consensus government," which included members of the province's different ethnic, religious, and linguistic groups.

The only organized opposition in the province was the Canadian Party of John Christian Schultz, which demanded swifter retribution against the leaders of Louis Riel's Red River Rebellion. Archibald's coalition won 17 seats, Schultz's party only 5. There were also two Independent MLAs: Thomas Bunn (who seems to have tacitly supported Archibald) and George Klyne (who does not appear to have played a major role in parliament). Edward Hay subsequently became Leader of the Opposition.

Formal party politics had not yet arrived in Manitoba, although some candidates were associated with the Liberal and Conservative parties at the national level.

== Riding results ==
Baie St. Paul:

- Joseph Dubuc (Government/C) accl.

Headingly:

- John Taylor (Opposition) 32
- James Cunningham (Government) 31

High Bluff:

- John Norquay (Government) accl.

Kildonan:

- John Sutherland (Opposition) 38
- Donald Matheson (Government) 31

Lake Manitoba:

- Angus McKay (Government) accl.

Poplar Point:

- David Spence (Government) 26
- D. Cook 18
- George Gunn (Government) 14

Portage la Prairie:

- Frederick Bird (Opposition) 37
- John Setter (Government) 36
- William Garriock 3

Ste. Agathe:

- George Klyne 19
- Alexander Morin 14

St. Andrews North:

- Alfred Boyd (Government) 58
- Donald Gunn (Government) 28

St. Andrews South:

- Edward Hay (Opposition/L) 38
- Thomas Sinclair (Government) 28
- John Gunn (Government) 20

Ste. Anne:

- John McTavish (Government/C) accl.

St. Boniface East:

- Marc-Amable Girard (Government/C) accl.

St. Boniface West:

- Louis Schmidt (Government/C) accl.

St. Charles:

- Henry Joseph Clarke (Government/C) accl.

St. Clements:

- Thomas Bunn (Independent/probably Government) 39
- Charles Begg 32

St. Francois Xavier East:

- Pascal Breland (Government) 31
- John Bruce 18

St. Francois Xavier West:

- Joseph Royal (Government/C) accl.

St. James:

- Edwin Bourke (Opposition) 35
- Molyneaux St. John (Government) 21

St. Norbert North:

- Joseph Lemay (Government) 35
- Joseph Geuton 9

St. Norbert South:

- Pierre Delorme (Government/C) 50
- Joseph Hamelin 22

St. Pauls:

- Curtis Bird (Government) 38
- Hugh Pritchard 37

St. Peters:

- Thomas Howard (Government/C) 75
- Joseph Monkman 11

St. Vital:

- André Beauchemin (Government) accl.

[Note: Louis Riel had been requested to run here; he declined.]

Winnipeg and St. John:

- Donald Alexander Smith (Government/C) 70
- John Christian Schultz (Opposition) 63

post-election changes:

On March 30, 1871, John Taylor's victory in Headingly was overturned and James Cunningham was declared elected. One of Taylor's votes had been cast too late; the tie-breaking vote was also disqualified.

Winnipeg and St. John (res. Donald Alexander Smith, January 1874), April 1874:

- Robert A. Davis (Opposition) 112
- Alex McMicken 66

The government was dominated by the Lieutenant Governors (Archibald and his successor, Alexander Morris) until July 1874, when Joseph Dubuc's francophone bloc joined forces with the Opposition members to bring down the government. Marc-Amable Girard then served as Premier from July to November 1874, at which time he was replaced by Robert A. Davis.
