= List of lieutenant governors of Manitoba =

The following is a list of the lieutenant governors of Manitoba. Though the present day office of the lieutenant governor in Manitoba came into being only upon the province's entry into Canadian Confederation in 1870, the post is a continuation from the first governorship of the Northwest Territories in 1869.

== Lieutenant governors of Manitoba, 1870–present ==
No.	Portrait	Name (birth–death)	Term of office		Monarch Reign	Premier Term of office
No.	Portrait	Name (birth–death)	Took office	Left office	Monarch Reign	Premier Term of office
1		Adams George Archibald (1814–1892)	20 May 1870	2 December 1872 (Note: Francis Godschall Johnson was appointed as lieutenant governor on 9 April 1872, but his commission was revoked before he was sworn in. He was usually included in 19th-century lists of Manitoba's lieutenant governors, but was dropped from the lists in the early 20th century.)	Victoria (1837–1901)	Alfred Boyd (1870–1871)
1		Adams George Archibald (1814–1892)	20 May 1870	2 December 1872	Victoria (1837–1901)	Marc-Amable Girard (1871–1872)
1		Adams George Archibald (1814–1892)	20 May 1870	2 December 1872	Victoria (1837–1901)	Henry Joseph Clarke (1872–1874)
2		Alexander Morris (1826–1889)	2 December 1872	7 October 1877	Victoria (1837–1901)	Henry Joseph Clarke (1872–1874)
2		Alexander Morris (1826–1889)	2 December 1872	7 October 1877	Victoria (1837–1901)	Marc-Amable Girard (1874)
2		Alexander Morris (1826–1889)	2 December 1872	7 October 1877	Victoria (1837–1901)	Robert Atkinson Davis (1874–1878)
3		Joseph-Édouard Cauchon (1816–1885)	8 October 1877	28 September 1882	Victoria (1837–1901)	Robert Atkinson Davis (1874–1878)
3		Joseph-Édouard Cauchon (1816–1885)	8 October 1877	28 September 1882	Victoria (1837–1901)	John Norquay (1878–1887)
4		James Cox Aikins (1823–1904)	29 September 1882	30 June 1888	Victoria (1837–1901)	John Norquay (1878–1887)
4		James Cox Aikins (1823–1904)	29 September 1882	30 June 1888	Victoria (1837–1901)	David Howard Harrison (1887–1888)
4		James Cox Aikins (1823–1904)	29 September 1882	30 June 1888	Victoria (1837–1901)	Thomas Greenway (1888–1900)
5		John Christian Schultz (1840–1896)	1 July 1888	1 September 1895	Victoria (1837–1901)	Thomas Greenway (1888–1900)
6		James Colebrooke Patterson (1839–1929)	2 September 1895	9 October 1900	Victoria (1837–1901)	Thomas Greenway (1888–1900)
6		James Colebrooke Patterson (1839–1929)	2 September 1895	9 October 1900	Victoria (1837–1901)	Hugh John Macdonald (1900)
7		Sir Daniel Hunter McMillan (1846–1933)	10 October 1900	1 August 1911	Victoria (1837–1901)	Hugh John Macdonald (1900)
7		Sir Daniel Hunter McMillan (1846–1933)	10 October 1900	1 August 1911	Victoria (1837–1901)	Sir Rodmond Roblin (1900–1915)
7		Sir Daniel Hunter McMillan (1846–1933)	10 October 1900	1 August 1911	Edward VII (1901–1910)	Sir Rodmond Roblin (1900–1915)
7		Sir Daniel Hunter McMillan (1846–1933)	10 October 1900	1 August 1911	George V (1910–1936)	Sir Rodmond Roblin (1900–1915)
8		Sir Douglas Cameron (1854–1921)	1 August 1911	3 August 1916	George V (1910–1936)	Sir Rodmond Roblin (1900–1915)
8		Sir Douglas Cameron (1854–1921)	1 August 1911	3 August 1916	George V (1910–1936)	Tobias Norris (1915–1922)
9		Sir James Albert Manning Aikins (1851–1929)	3 August 1916	9 October 1926	George V (1910–1936)	Tobias Norris (1915–1922)
9		Sir James Albert Manning Aikins (1851–1929)	3 August 1916	9 October 1926	George V (1910–1936)	John Bracken (1922–1943)
10		Theodore Arthur Burrows (1857–1929)	9 October 1926	18 January 1929	George V (1910–1936)	John Bracken (1922–1943)
–		William Egerton Perdue (1850–1933); Administrator of the Government	18 January 1929	25 January 1929	George V (1910–1936)	John Bracken (1922–1943)
11		James Duncan McGregor (1860–1935)	25 January 1929	1 December 1934	George V (1910–1936)	John Bracken (1922–1943)
12		William Johnston Tupper (1862–1947)	1 December 1934	1 November 1940	George V (1910–1936)	John Bracken (1922–1943)
12		William Johnston Tupper (1862–1947)	1 December 1934	1 November 1940	Edward VIII (1936)	John Bracken (1922–1943)
12		William Johnston Tupper (1862–1947)	1 December 1934	1 November 1940	George VI (1936–1952)	John Bracken (1922–1943)
13		Roland Fairbairn McWilliams (1874–1957)	1 November 1940	1 August 1953	George VI (1936–1952)	John Bracken (1922–1943)
13		Roland Fairbairn McWilliams (1874–1957)	1 November 1940	1 August 1953	George VI (1936–1952)	Stuart Garson (1943–1948)
13		Roland Fairbairn McWilliams (1874–1957)	1 November 1940	1 August 1953	George VI (1936–1952)	Douglas Lloyd Campbell (1948–1958)
13		Roland Fairbairn McWilliams (1874–1957)	1 November 1940	1 August 1953	Elizabeth II (1952–2022)	Douglas Lloyd Campbell (1948–1958)
14		John Stewart McDiarmid (1882–1965)	1 August 1953	15 January 1960	Elizabeth II (1952–2022)	Douglas Lloyd Campbell (1948–1958)
14		John Stewart McDiarmid (1882–1965)	1 August 1953	15 January 1960	Elizabeth II (1952–2022)	Dufferin Roblin (1958–1967)
15		Errick Willis (1896–1967)	15 January 1960	1 November 1965	Elizabeth II (1952–2022)	Dufferin Roblin (1958–1967)
16		Richard Spink Bowles (1912–1988)	1 November 1965	2 September 1970	Elizabeth II (1952–2022)	Dufferin Roblin (1958–1967)
16		Richard Spink Bowles (1912–1988)	1 November 1965	2 September 1970	Elizabeth II (1952–2022)	Walter Weir (1967–1969)
16		Richard Spink Bowles (1912–1988)	1 November 1965	2 September 1970	Elizabeth II (1952–2022)	Edward Schreyer (1969–1977)
17		William John McKeag (1928–2007)	2 September 1970	15 March 1976	Elizabeth II (1952–2022)	Edward Schreyer (1969–1977)
18		Francis Lawrence Jobin (1914–1995)	15 March 1976	23 October 1981	Elizabeth II (1952–2022)	Edward Schreyer (1969–1977)
18		Francis Lawrence Jobin (1914–1995)	15 March 1976	23 October 1981	Elizabeth II (1952–2022)	Sterling Lyon (1977–1981)
19		Pearl McGonigal (born 1929)	23 October 1981	11 December 1986	Elizabeth II (1952–2022)	Sterling Lyon (1977–1981)
19		Pearl McGonigal (born 1929)	23 October 1981	11 December 1986	Elizabeth II (1952–2022)	Howard Pawley (1981–1988)
20		George Johnson (1920–1995)	11 December 1986	5 March 1993	Elizabeth II (1952–2022)	Howard Pawley (1981–1988)
20		George Johnson (1920–1995)	11 December 1986	5 March 1993	Elizabeth II (1952–2022)	Gary Filmon (1988–1999)
21		Yvon Dumont (born 1951)	5 March 1993	2 March 1999	Elizabeth II (1952–2022)	Gary Filmon (1988–1999)
22		Peter Liba (1940–2007)	2 March 1999	30 June 2004	Elizabeth II (1952–2022)	Gary Filmon (1988–1999)
22		Peter Liba (1940–2007)	2 March 1999	30 June 2004	Elizabeth II (1952–2022)	Gary Doer (1999–2009)
23		John Harvard (1938–2016)	30 June 2004	4 August 2009	Elizabeth II (1952–2022)	Gary Doer (1999–2009)
24		Philip S. Lee (born 1944)	4 August 2009	19 June 2015	Elizabeth II (1952–2022)	Gary Doer (1999–2009)
24		Philip S. Lee (born 1944)	4 August 2009	19 June 2015	Elizabeth II (1952–2022)	Greg Selinger (2009–2016)
25		Janice Filmon (born 1943)	19 June 2015	24 October 2022	Elizabeth II (1952–2022)	Greg Selinger (2009–2016)
25		Janice Filmon (born 1943)	19 June 2015	24 October 2022	Elizabeth II (1952–2022)	Brian Pallister (2016–2021)
25		Janice Filmon (born 1943)	19 June 2015	24 October 2022	Elizabeth II (1952–2022)	Kelvin Goertzen (2021)
25		Janice Filmon (born 1943)	19 June 2015	24 October 2022	Elizabeth II (1952–2022)	Heather Stefanson (2021–2023)
25		Janice Filmon (born 1943)	19 June 2015	24 October 2022	Charles III (since 2022)	Heather Stefanson (2021–2023)
26		Anita Neville (born 1942)	24 October 2022	Incumbent	Charles III (since 2022)	Heather Stefanson (2021–2023)
26		Anita Neville (born 1942)	24 October 2022	Incumbent	Charles III (since 2022)	Wab Kinew (since 2023)

== See also ==
- Office-holders of Canada
- Canadian incumbents by year
