= 7th Manitoba Legislature =

Canadian legislative group

The members of the 7th Manitoba Legislature were elected in the Manitoba general election held in July 1888. The legislature sat from August 28, 1888, to June 27, 1892.

The Liberals led by Thomas Greenway formed the government.

John Norquay served as Leader of the Opposition until his death in 1889. Rodmond Roblin was leader of the opposition from 1890 to 1892.

On March 31, 1890, the legislative assembly enacted the Public Schools Act of 1890 which removed public funding for Catholic and Protestant denominational schools and established a tax-funded non-denominational public school system. On the same date, the assembly enacted the Official Language Act, making English the sole language of records, minutes and Manitoba government laws. This removed the rights granted to French-speaking Manitobans under the Manitoba Act of 1870.

William Winram served as speaker for the assembly until his death in February 1891. Samuel Jacob Jackson succeeded Winram as speaker.

There were five sessions of the 7th Legislature:

| Session | Start | End |
|---|---|---|
| 1st | August 28, 1888 | October 16, 1888 |
| 2nd | November 8, 1888 | March 5, 1889 |
| 3rd | January 30, 1890 | March 31, 1890 |
| 4th | February 26, 1891 | April 28, 1891 |
| 5th | March 10, 1892 | April 20, 1892 |

John Christian Schultz was Lieutenant Governor of Manitoba.

== Members of the Assembly ==
The following members were elected to the assembly in 1888:

| Member | Electoral district | Party | First elected / previously elected | No.# of term(s) |
|---|---|---|---|---|
| John Crawford | Beautiful Plains | Liberal | 1886 | 2nd term |
| Charles Mickle | Birtle | Liberal | 1888 | 1st term |
| James A. Smart | Brandon City | Liberal | 1886 | 2nd term |
| Clifford Sifton | Brandon North | Liberal | 1888 | 1st term |
| Herbert Graham | Brandon South | Liberal | 1888 | 1st term |
| Martin Jérôme | Carillon | Liberal | 1888 | 1st term |
| Thomas Gelley | Cartier | Liberal | 1886 (Note: First elected as a Conservative) | 2nd term |
| Ernest Jameson Wood | Cypress | Conservative | 1888 | 1st term |
| Daniel McLean | Dennis | Liberal | 1886 | 2nd term |
| Rodmond Roblin | Dufferin | Liberal | 1888 | 2nd term |
| James Thomson | Emerson | Liberal | 1888 | 1st term |
| John Norquay | Kildonan | Conservative | 1870 | 7th term |
| Thomas Norquay (1890) | Kildonan | Conservative | 1890 | 1st term |
| Finlay McNaughton Young | Killarney | Liberal | 1883 | 3rd term |
| Kenneth McKenzie | Lakeside | Liberal | 1874, (Note: Portage la Prairie) 1886 | 4th term* |
| Edward Dickson | Lansdowne | Liberal | 1888 | 1st term |
| William Lagimodière | La Verendrye | Liberal | 1888 | 1st term |
| Robert George O'Malley | Lorne | Conservative | 1888 | 1st term |
| William Winram | Manitou | Liberal | 1879 | 5th term |
| James Huston (1892) | Manitou | Conservative | 1892 | 1st term |
| James Gillies | Minnedosa | Conservative | 1886 | 2nd term |
| Alexander Lawrence | Morden | Liberal | 1888 | 1st term |
| Alphonse-Fortunat Martin | Morris | Liberal | 1874, (Note: Ste. Agathe) 1886 | 3rd term* |
| Thomas Greenway | Mountain | Liberal | 1879 | 5th term |
| Samuel Thompson | Norfolk | Liberal | 1886 | 2nd term |
| Joseph Martin | Portage la Prairie | Liberal | 1883 | 3rd term |
| Samuel Jacob Jackson | Rockwood | Liberal | 1883 | 3rd term |
| Enoch Winkler | Rosenfeldt | Liberal | 1888 | 1st term |
| James Fisher | Russell | Liberal | 1888 | 1st term |
| James Fisher | Russell | Independent | 1888 | 1st term |
| Frederick Colcleugh | St. Andrews | Liberal | 1888 | 1st term |
| Roger Marion | St. Boniface | Conservative | 1886 | 2nd term |
| James Harrower | Shoal Lake | Liberal | 1888 | 1st term |
| Archibald McIntyre Campbell | Souris | Liberal | 1888 | 1st term |
| Thomas Henry Smith | Springfield | Independent | 1888 | 1st term |
| John Hettle | Turtle Mountain | Liberal | 1888 | 1st term |
| Thomas Lewis Morton | Westbourne | Liberal | 1888 | 1st term |
| Daniel Hunter McMillan | Winnipeg Centre | Liberal | 1880, 1888 | 2nd term* |
| Lyman Melvin Jones | Winnipeg North | Liberal | 1888 | 2nd term |
| Isaac Campbell | Winnipeg South | Liberal | 1888 | 1st term |
| John Donald Cameron (1892) | Winnipeg South | Liberal | 1892 | 1st term |
| James Prendergast | Woodlands | Liberal | 1885 | 3rd term |
| James Prendergast | Woodlands | Independent | 1885 | 3rd term |

== By-elections ==
By-elections were held to replace members for various reasons:

| Electoral district | Member elected | Affiliation | Election date | Reason |
|---|---|---|---|---|
| Winnipeg Centre | Daniel Hunter McMillan | Liberal | May 18, 1889 | D.M. Hunter ran for reelection upon appointment as Provincial Treasurer |
| Dennis | Daniel McLean | Liberal | September 15, 1889 | D. McLean ran for reelection upon appointment as Provincial Secretary |
| Kildonan | Thomas Norquay | Conservative | February 1, 1890 | J Norquay died July 5, 1889 |
| Portage la Prairie | Joseph Martin | Liberal | March 28, 1891 | J. Martin ran for federal seat |
| Brandon North | Clifford Sifton | Liberal | August 8, 1891 | C. Sifton ran for reelection upon appointment as Attorney-General |
| Manitou | James Huston | Liberal | January 13, 1892 | W Winram died February 12, 1891 |
| Winnipeg South | John Donald Cameron | Liberal | January 13, 1892 | I Campbell ran for federal seat |
