= 1874 Manitoba general election =

The 1874 Manitoba general election was held on December 30, 1874.

Persons elected:

| Constituency | Candidate Elected |
|---|---|
| Baie St. Paul | Felix Chenier |
| Headingley | John Taylor |
| High Bluff | James Cowan |
| Kildonan | John Sutherland |
| Lake Manitoba | Angus McKay |
| Poplar Point | Francis Cornish |
| Portage la Prairie | Kenneth McKenzie |
| Rockwood | William F. Luxton |
| St. Andrews North | John Gunn |
| St. Andrews South | John Norquay |
| St. Boniface | Marc-Amable Girard |
| St. Charles | Alexander Murray |
| St. Clements | Thomas Howard |
| St. Francois Xavier East | Maxime Lepine |
| St. Francois Xavier West | Joseph Royal |
| St. James | Edwin Bourke |
| St. Norbert | Joseph Dubuc |
| St. Pauls | Curtis Bird |
| St. Vital | Joseph Lemay |
| Ste. Agathe | Alphonse Martin |
| Ste. Anne | Charles Nolin |
| Springfield | William Dick |
| Westbourne | Corydon Brown |
| Winnipeg | Robert Davis |
