= George Gunn (Canadian politician) =

George Gunn (December 11, 1833 – 1901?) was a farmer and political figure in Manitoba who served in the Legislative Assembly of Assiniboia.

He was the son of Donald Gunn, a native of Scotland, and Margaret Swain, of Métis descent. He farmed at Poplar Point. Gunn ran unsuccessfully for the Poplar Point seat in the Legislative Assembly of Manitoba in 1870, losing to David Spence. He was named a justice of the peace for Marquette County and was elected to the school board for Poplar Point. Gunn is believed to have later moved to Swift Current, Saskatchewan, and married a Métis woman there. He reportedly died there in 1901.
