= St. Andrews (electoral district) =

Defunct provincial electoral district in Manitoba, Canada

St. Andrews is an historical provincial electoral district in Manitoba, Canada. It existed on two separate occasions, and was located to the immediate north of Winnipeg, the capital city.

== Members of the Legislative Assembly ==
When Manitoba joined Canadian Confederation in 1870, the St. Andrews region of the province was given two seats: St. Andrews North and St. Andrews South. It was consolidated into a single constituency following redistribution in 1879. In 1899, it was merged with the Kildonan constituency and Kildonan and St. Andrews.

The St. Andrews electoral division was initially dominated by anglophone "old settlers", who had resided in the Red River territory before it was incorporated as a province. Many of the old settlers were known as "mixed-bloods", referring to persons of British and aboriginal descent. John Norquay, a "mixed-blood" leader who served as Premier of Manitoba from 1878 to 1887, represented St. Andrews in the provincial legislature for many years. Alfred Boyd, who is sometimes lists as Manitoba's first premier, also represented a St. Andrews constituency from 1870 to 1874.

=== Original constituency ===
==== St. Andrews North ====
Name	Party	Took office	Left office
Alfred Boyd	Government Supporter	1870	1874
John Gunn	Independent	1874	1875
John Gunn	Government Supporter	1875	1879

==== St. Andrews South ====
Name	Party	Took office	Left office
Edward Hay	Opposition/Liberal	1870	1874
Edward Hay	Government Supporter/Liberal	1874	1874
John Norquay	Opposition/Conservative	1874	1875
John Norquay	Government Supporter/Conservative	1875	1879

==== St. Andrews ====
Name	Party	Took office	Left office
John Norquay	Government Supporter/Conservative	1879	1888
Frederick Colcleugh	Liberal	1888	1896
Sigtryggur Jonasson	Liberal	1888	1896

=== Re-established constituency ===
St. Andrews was re-established for the 1949 provincial election, when Kildonan and St. Andrews was eliminated through redistribution. It was eliminated a second time in 1958.

The re-established constituency's first representative was James McLenaghen, who was a Progressive Conservative cabinet minister in a coalition government led by the Liberal-Progressives. McLenaghen was a prominent defender of the coalition within his party, and his death in 1950 hastened its dissolution. He was replaced by Thomas Hillhouse of the Liberal-Progressives.

==== St. Andrews (1949–1958) ====
Name	Party	Took office	Left office
James McLenaghen	Progressive Conservative	1949	1950
Thomas Hillhouse	Liberal–Progressive	1950	1958

== Election results (St. Andrews) ==
=== 1879 ===
1879 Manitoba general election
Party	Candidate	Votes	%
Conservative	John Norquay	Acclaimed	–
Total valid votes		–	–
Rejected		N/A	–
Eligible voters / Turnout		N/A	–
Source(s) Source: Manitoba. Chief Electoral Officer (1999). Statement of Votes for the 37th Provincial General Election, September 21, 1999 (PDF) (Report). Winnipeg: Elections Manitoba.

=== 1883 ===
1883 Manitoba general election
Party	Candidate	Votes	%	±%
Conservative	John Norquay	Acclaimed	–	–
Total valid votes		–	–	–
Rejected		N/A	–	
Eligible voters / Turnout		N/A	–	–
Source(s) Source: Manitoba. Chief Electoral Officer (1999). Statement of Votes for the 37th Provincial General Election, September 21, 1999 (PDF) (Report). Winnipeg: Elections Manitoba.

=== 1886 ===
1886 Manitoba general election
Party	Candidate	Votes	%	±%
Conservative	John Norquay	342	55.61	–
Liberal	Frederick Colcleugh	273	44.39	–
Total valid votes		615	100	–
Rejected		N/A	–	
Eligible voters / Turnout		915	67.21	–
Source(s) Source: Manitoba. Chief Electoral Officer (1999). Statement of Votes for the 37th Provincial General Election, September 21, 1999 (PDF) (Report). Winnipeg: Elections Manitoba.

=== 1888 ===
1888 Manitoba general election
Party	Candidate	Votes	%	±%
Liberal	Frederick Colcleugh	Acclaimed	–	–
Total valid votes		–	–	–
Rejected		N/A	–	
Eligible voters / Turnout		N/A	–	–
Source(s) Source: Manitoba. Chief Electoral Officer (1999). Statement of Votes for the 37th Provincial General Election, September 21, 1999 (PDF) (Report). Winnipeg: Elections Manitoba.

=== 1892 ===
1892 Manitoba general election
Party	Candidate	Votes	%	±%
Liberal	Frederick Colcleugh	352	56.23	–
Conservative	Baldwin Baldwinson	274	43.77	–
Total valid votes		626	–	–
Rejected		N/A	–	
Eligible voters / Turnout		954	65.62	–
Source(s) Source: Manitoba. Chief Electoral Officer (1999). Statement of Votes for the 37th Provincial General Election, September 21, 1999 (PDF) (Report). Winnipeg: Elections Manitoba.

=== 1896 ===
1896 Manitoba general election
Party	Candidate	Votes	%	±%
Liberal	Sigtryggur Jonasson	447	54.85	-1.38
Conservative	Baldwin Baldwinson	368	45.15	+1.38
Total valid votes		815	100	–
Rejected		N/A	–	
Eligible voters / Turnout		1,306	62.40	-3.21
Source(s) Source: Manitoba. Chief Electoral Officer (1999). Statement of Votes for the 37th Provincial General Election, September 21, 1999 (PDF) (Report). Winnipeg: Elections Manitoba.

=== 1949 ===
1949 Manitoba general election
Party	Candidate	Votes	%	±%
Progressive Conservative	James McLenaghen	3,458	67.67	–
Co-operative Commonwealth	William E. Gordon	1,652	32.33	–
Total valid votes		5,110	98.04	–
Rejected		102	1.96	
Eligible voters / Turnout		7,661	68.03	+5.63
Source(s) Source: Manitoba. Chief Electoral Officer (1999). Statement of Votes for the 37th Provincial General Election, September 21, 1999 (PDF) (Report). Winnipeg: Elections Manitoba.

=== 1950 by-election ===
Manitoba provincial by-election, October 24, 1950 Death of James McLenaghen
Party	Candidate	Votes	%	±%
Liberal–Progressive	Thomas P. Hillhouse	2,138	46.14	–
Co-operative Commonwealth	William E. Gordon	1,309	28.25	-4.08
Unknown	John Veitch	1,187	25.62	–
Total valid votes		4,634	100	–
Rejected		N/A	–	
Eligible voters / Turnout		N/A	–	–
Source(s) Source: Manitoba. Chief Electoral Officer (1999). Statement of Votes for the 37th Provincial General Election, September 21, 1999 (PDF) (Report). Winnipeg: Elections Manitoba.

=== 1953 ===
1953 Manitoba general election
Party	Candidate	Votes	%	±%
Liberal–Progressive	Thomas P. Hillhouse	2,938	57.14	+11.00
Progressive Conservative	Keith Hedley Robson	1,366	26.57	–
Co-operative Commonwealth	Ernest Draffin	838	16.30	-11.95
Total valid votes		5,142	98.22	–
Rejected		93	1.78	
Eligible voters / Turnout		8,044	65.08	–
Source(s) Source: Manitoba. Chief Electoral Officer (1999). Statement of Votes for the 37th Provincial General Election, September 21, 1999 (PDF) (Report). Winnipeg: Elections Manitoba.

== Election results (St. Andrews North) ==
=== 1870 ===
1870 Manitoba general election: St. Andrews North
Party	Candidate	Votes	%
Government	Alfred Boyd	58	67.44
Government	Donald Gunn	28	32.56
Total valid votes		86	–
Rejected		N/A	–
Eligible voters / Turnout		N/A	–
Source(s) Source: Manitoba. Chief Electoral Officer (1999). Statement of Votes for the 37th Provincial General Election, September 21, 1999 (PDF) (Report). Winnipeg: Elections Manitoba.

=== 1874 ===
1874 Manitoba general election: St. Andrews North
Party	Candidate	Votes	%	±%
Undeclared	John Gunn	83	69.75	–
Undeclared	Alex McPherson	36	30.25	–
Total valid votes		119	–	–
Rejected		N/A	–	
Eligible voters / Turnout		158	75.32	–
Source(s) Source: Manitoba. Chief Electoral Officer (1999). Statement of Votes for the 37th Provincial General Election, September 21, 1999 (PDF) (Report). Winnipeg: Elections Manitoba.

=== 1878 ===
1878 Manitoba general election: St. Andrews North
Party	Candidate	Votes	%	±%
Undeclared	John Gunn	69	54.33	-45.67
Undeclared	Edward Hay	58	45.67	-54.33
Total valid votes		127	–	–
Rejected		N/A	–	
Eligible voters / Turnout		198	64.14	-11.18
Source(s) Source: Manitoba. Chief Electoral Officer (1999). Statement of Votes for the 37th Provincial General Election, September 21, 1999 (PDF) (Report). Winnipeg: Elections Manitoba.

== Election results (St. Andrews South) ==
=== 1870 ===
1870 Manitoba general election: St. Andrews South
Party	Candidate	Votes	%
Opposition	Edward Hay	38	44.19
Government	Thomas Sinclair	28	32.56
Government	John Gunn	20	23.26
Total valid votes		86	–
Rejected		N/A	–
Eligible voters / Turnout		N/A	–
Source(s) Source: Manitoba. Chief Electoral Officer (1999). Statement of Votes for the 37th Provincial General Election, September 21, 1999 (PDF) (Report). Winnipeg: Elections Manitoba.

=== 1874 ===
1874 Manitoba general election: St. Andrews South
Party	Candidate	Votes	%	±%
Government	John Norquay	67	66.34	10.52
Undeclared	Edward Hay	34	33.66	–
Total valid votes		101	–	–
Rejected		N/A	–	
Eligible voters / Turnout		140	72.14	–
Source(s) Source: Manitoba. Chief Electoral Officer (1999). Statement of Votes for the 37th Provincial General Election, September 21, 1999 (PDF) (Report). Winnipeg: Elections Manitoba.

=== 1875 by-election ===
Manitoba provincial by-election, March 13, 1875: St. Andrews South
Party	Candidate	Votes	%	±%
Government	John Norquay	Acclaimed	–	–
Total valid votes			–	–
Rejected		N/A	–	
Eligible voters / Turnout		N/A	–	–
Source(s) Source: Manitoba. Chief Electoral Officer (1999). Statement of Votes for the 37th Provincial General Election, September 21, 1999 (PDF) (Report). Winnipeg: Elections Manitoba.

=== 1878 ===
1878 Manitoba general election: St. Andrews South
Party	Candidate	Votes	%	±%
Government	John Norquay	62	53.45	–
Undeclared	John Beresford Allan	54	46.55	–
Total valid votes		116	–	–
Rejected		N/A	–	
Eligible voters / Turnout		142	81.69	–
Source(s) Source: Manitoba. Chief Electoral Officer (1999). Statement of Votes for the 37th Provincial General Election, September 21, 1999 (PDF) (Report). Winnipeg: Elections Manitoba.

== See also ==
- List of Manitoba provincial electoral districts
- Canadian provincial electoral districts
