= John Norquay =

Canadian politician (1841–1889)

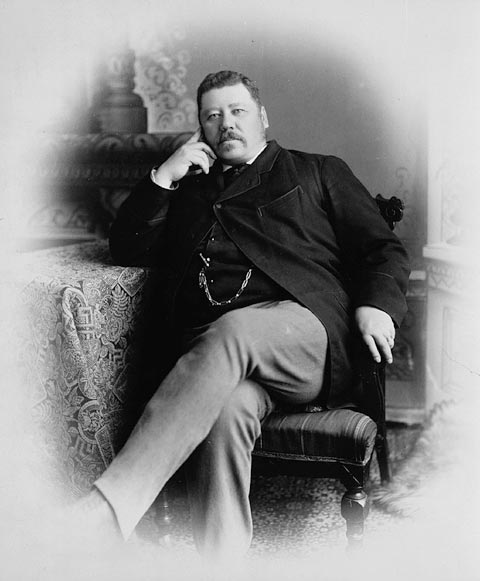

5th Premier of Manitoba
- In office October 16, 1878 – December 24, 1887
- Monarch: Victoria
- Lieutenant Governor: Joseph-Édouard Cauchon; James Cox Aikins
- Preceded by: Robert Atkinson Davis
- Succeeded by: David Howard Harrison

Member of the Legislative Assembly of Manitoba for High Bluff
- In office December 27, 1870 – December 23, 1874
- Preceded by: John Crerar
- Succeeded by: District divided

Member of the Legislative Assembly of Manitoba for St. Andrews South
- In office December 23, 1874 – December 16, 1879
- Preceded by: Edward Hay
- Succeeded by: District re-created

Member of the Legislative Assembly of Manitoba for St. Andrews
- In office December 16, 1879 – July 11, 1888
- Preceded by: District re-created
- Succeeded by: Frederick Colcleugh

Member of the Legislative Assembly of Manitoba for Kildonan
- In office July 11, 1888 – July 5, 1889
- Preceded by: John MacBeth
- Succeeded by: Thomas Norquay

Personal details
- Born: May 8, 1841 near St. Andrews, Rupert's Land
- Died: July 5, 1889 (aged 48) Winnipeg, Manitoba
- Party: Conservative
- Spouse: Elizabeth Setter (m. 1862)
- Relations: Thomas Norquay (brother)
- Children: 8 (3 daughters and 5 sons)
- Education: St John's Collegiate School
- Occupation: teacher, farmer and fur trader
- Profession: Politician
- Cabinet: Minister of Public Works/Minister of Agriculture (1871–1874); Provincial Secretary (1875–1876 & 1886–1887); Minister of Public Works (1875–1878); Provincial Treasurer (1878–1886); President of the Council (1879–1887); Railway Commissioner (1886–1887)

John Norquay (May 8, 1841 – July 5, 1889) was the fifth premier of Manitoba from 1878 to 1887. He was born near St. Andrews in what was then the Red River Colony, making him the first premier of Manitoba to have been born in the region. Norquay was also the first Indigenous Premier of a Canadian province.

== Early life ==
Norquay came from an Anglo-Métis ethnic background (the contemporary term used was "half-breed", which was not then considered offensive and is even an important constitutional designation, given the rights afforded to them in the Manitoba Act of 1870). He was educated by Church of England bishop, David Anderson, and worked as a teacher, farmer, and fur trader during the 1860s.

== Early political career ==
Norquay played only a minor role in the events of Louis Riel's Red River Rebellion (1869–70), but decided to enter public life shortly thereafter. He was acclaimed for the riding of High Bluff in Manitoba's first general election (December 27, 1870), and soon became a leader in the "mixed-blood" community.

In 1871, Manitoba's parliamentary opposition agitated for the removal of Alfred Boyd, the provincial secretary. When this opposition became impossible to ignore, he resigned. In withdrawing from office, Boyd suggested that someone from Manitoba's "mixed-blood" community be called to cabinet in his place (Manitoba's government was balanced along ethnic, religious and linguistic lines in this period, but British "mixed-bloods" had been left out of the first cabinet). Norquay was accordingly called to serve as Minister of Public Works and Minister of Agriculture.

While still serving as a provincial cabinet minister, Norquay attempted to enter federal politics in the general election of 1872. Running in the riding of Marquette, he was defeated by Robert Cunningham, an ally of Louis Riel. He would not run for federal office again.

Manitoba's first government (which did not have a premier) lost a vote of confidence in July 1874, after Norquay's electoral redistribution bill met with opposition from both English and French MLAs. Norquay did not serve in the cabinet of Marc-Amable Girard (1874), nor was he called into the first cabinet of Robert A. Davis (1874–1878). In Manitoba's second election (December 30, 1874), he was a leader of the opposition; running in St. Andrew's South, he defeated former Girard minister Edward Henry Hay by 67 votes to 34.

The 1874 election resulted in a hung parliament, with Davis's support coming primarily from French-speaking constituencies. Davis knew that he would be unable to govern effectively without strong British representation, and invited Norquay to join his cabinet in March 1875. Norquay accepted, and brought with him enough parliamentary support to ensure the ministry's continued survival.

== Premiership ==
Norquay was a prominent minister in the Davis administration, and it was not a surprise when he was called to replace Davis as Premier in November 1878 (he also took the office of Provincial Treasurer). He sought a new mandate on December 18, 1878, and was re-elected with the support of 14-17 MLAs (out of 24). Norquay faced a tough challenge in his own constituency from one John Allan, but won by 62 votes to 54.

In early 1879, Norquay faced a more serious challenge after losing the support of Joseph Royal. Royal was an ultramontane Catholic and the undisputed leader of the Francophone parliamentary bloc. Like Norquay, he had been a prominent minister in the Davis administration (in fact, he had often referred it as the "Davis-Royal" administration). Now, he sought to forge a new parliamentary alliance with opposition leader Thomas Scott, an Orangeman and a leading figure among the new Ontario settlers (not to be confused with the man of the same name executed by Louis Riel) in 1870. Royal and Scott wanted to bring formal party politics to Manitoba; both were Conservatives, and Scott believed that he was best positioned to become the leader of a provincial Conservative Party. Norquay was also affiliated with the federal Conservatives, but relied on support from local Liberals to keep his government intact. Accordingly, he wanted to preserve the province's "non-partisan" character.

Norquay countered the Royal-Scott "coup attempt" by forging a new parliamentary alliance with all of the province's British MLAs (except Scott), and expelling his French Canadian ministers from cabinet. This reconstituted ministry then sought to pass a variety of bills which were detrimental to Francophone interests.

Norquay did not follow through on the worst of his ministry's threats. He recognized the need for conciliation, and soon convinced former premier, Marc-Amable Girard, to rejoin cabinet as provincial secretary. Norquay would later argue that his "anti-French" ministry was an unpleasant political necessity. The Norquay-Girard government won a new mandate on December 16, 1879, with Norquay re-elected by acclamation in the riding of St. Andrew's.

=== Railway development ===
In terms of the legislation it promoted, Norquay's ministry may be described as interventionist but not particularly ambitious. Like many other Canadian politicians in the 19th century, Norquay devoted much of his attention to railway development. As a result, he was compelled to walk a thin line between local and federal alliances; eventually, his inability to successfully navigate this course led to his downfall.

During the 1880s, many entrepreneurs in Manitoba tried to develop local rail lines to reduce transportation costs. Although popular with farmers and merchants, these plans were opposed by the Canadian Pacific Railway (CPR), which had a guaranteed 20-year monopoly on "western travel" through the area (some historians have argued that the "local service lines" were a financial impossibility to begin with). Although Norquay initially gave tepid support to these local efforts, the opposition accused him (probably correctly) of having made a secret deal with the CPR and John A. Macdonald, Canadian prime minister, to ensure that they never came to fruition. When Macdonald disallowed Norquay's half-hearted railway legislation in 1882, a coherent local opposition began to form around Thomas Greenway, whose "Provincial Rights" group would soon become the Manitoba Liberal Party.

These developments brought Norquay into a reluctant alliance with the province's Conservative establishment (which had opposed him only three years earlier). While Norquay still claimed to be non-partisan, his MLAs were recognized as the de facto Conservative Party within Manitoba. In Manitoba's fifth election (January 23, 1883), "Liberal-Conservative" and "Conservative" candidates won 19 of 30 seats between them; all were regarded as Norquay supporters, set against a Liberal opposition. Formal party government would not arrive until 1888, but a functional two-party system was already in place.

Although John A. Macdonald was sometimes disparaging of Norquay in private correspondence, he supported the Norquay ministry for most of its nine years in power. Macdonald took Norquay's side in a boundary dispute with Ontario, and personally visited Manitoba in 1886 to ensure Norquay's re-election on December 9 of that year: Norquay's Conservatives won about 21 seats, compared to 14 for Greenway's Liberals with the popular vote almost evenly split. Without Macdonald's visit, Norquay probably would have been defeated.

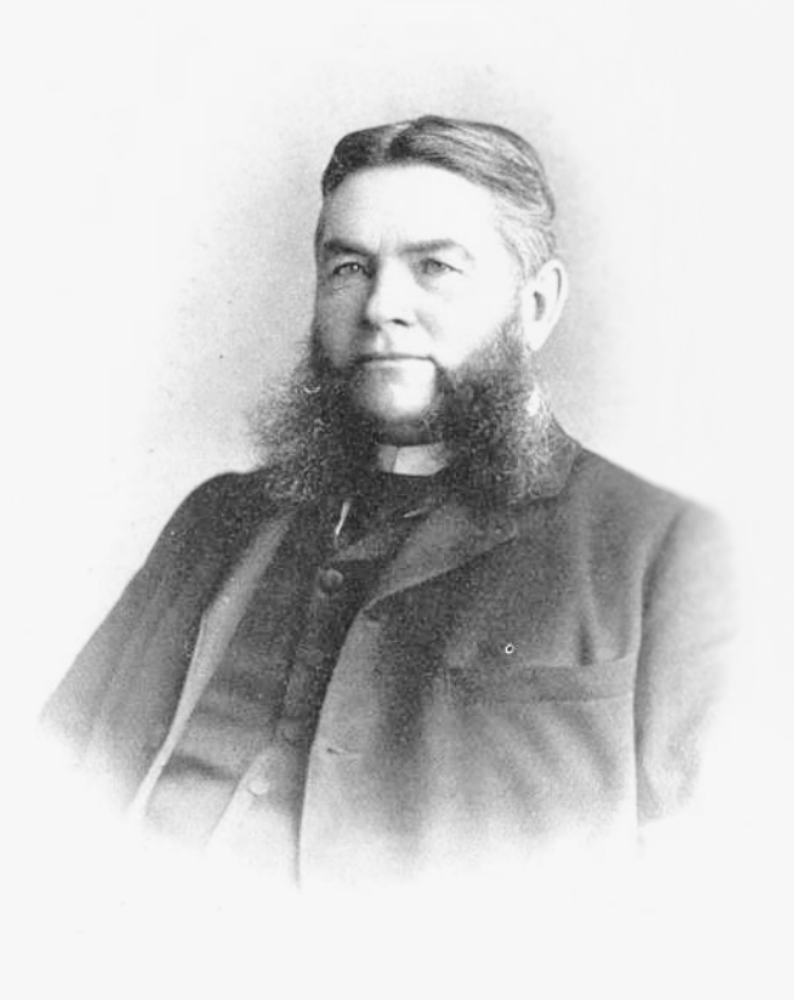
Canadian Railway magnate Hugh Ryan, who sued Norquay over the Red River Valley Railway, a scandal that played a role in ending his political career

Norquay's alliance with Macdonald ended in the summer of 1887, when the provincial government reversed its previous policy and actively promoted the Red River Valley Railway, a local line meant to link Winnipeg with the Canada–United States border. Macdonald and the CPR would both play leading roles in Norquay's downfall later in the year.

Due to the opposition of Macdonald and the C.P.R., Norquay's government became delinquent on payments for the construction of the Red River Valley Railway. As a result, Norquay's government was sued by prominent Canadian railway magnate Hugh Ryan, whose firm H. & J. Ryan was awarded the contract for the Red River Valley Railway. The scandal further contributed to Norquay's growing image problem amongst his constituents and was worsened when the courts sided with Ryan; with Ryan being awarded $50,000 for unpaid work (the equivalent of $1.6 million in 2024).

=== Defeat ===
In September 1887, the Norquay government was accused of using trust funds for Métis children as general revenue. Norquay himself faced extreme pressure to resign, particularly after a tour of eastern cities for railway loans ended without success. His ministry's fate was sealed when Macdonald disallowed the transfer of CPR land to Manitoba, after Norquay's government had already paid $256,000 to the company in compensation. Norquay was abandoned by his ministers, and resigned on December 23, 1887. His successor, David H. Harrison, unsuccessfully tried to keep Norquay's governing alliance together for another month; after this, Greenway was called upon to form a new ministry.

Greenway's Liberals won a landslide victory on July 11, 1888. Norquay was narrowly re-elected in Kildonan, defeating Liberal Duncan McArthur by 305 votes to 303. He once again became leader of the opposition, but with a much reduced political base: he was now opposed by John A. Macdonald, distrusted by other Manitoba Conservatives, lacking in popular support, and suffering personal financial hardship. He died on July 5, 1889, without having attained a reversal in his fortunes.

== Legacy ==
Despite the tragedy of his last years, Norquay was generally successful in developing Manitoba during his time in office. Between his first election in 1870 and his resignation in 1887, the population of Manitoba had grown tenfold; as Premier, Norquay was responsible for expanding government services accordingly.

In addition to his political career, John Norquay was also a prominent lay member of the Church of England in Manitoba. Beginning in 1875, he was regularly elected as a representative to the synod of the Diocese of Rupert's Land.

It may be added that Norquay's career was relatively free of racial prejudice. He was the victim of some racial slurs (Legislative Councilor Donald Gunn once referred to him as "Greasy John"), but his longevity in office suggests that Manitobans were willing to accept an aboriginal premier, despite the tensions caused by Louis Riel's rebellions.

In 1904, Mount Norquay in Banff National Park was named after him. Norquay attempted to climb the mountain in 1887 or 1888 but contrary to some reports, did not reach the summit. Poor health and route difficulties presented by the mountain were the likely reasons for not reaching the top.
