= H. & J. Ryan =

Defunct Canadian railway firm

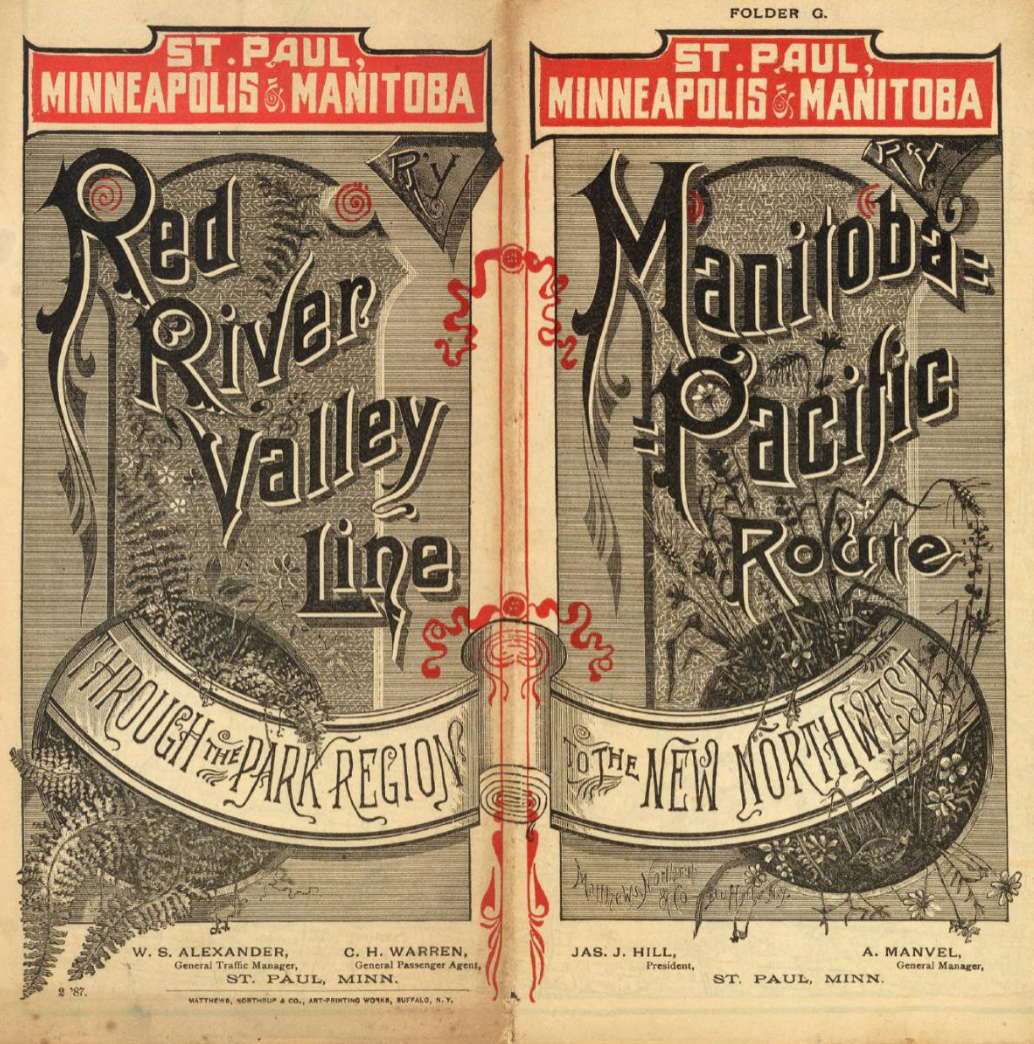
- Red River Valley Railway Line advertisement in 1887, built by Canadian firm H & J Ryan
- Type: Private
- Industry: Railway construction; Canal construction; Bridge construction
- Founded: 1855 in Perth, Ontario
- Founder: Hugh Ryan (railway magnate)
- Defunct: 1899
- Key people: Hugh Ryan (railway magnate) (CEO); John Ryan (Chairman)

H. & J. Ryan (est.1855) was a prominent Canadian railway firm founded in Perth, Ontario, by industrialist Hugh Ryan (1832–1899) and his younger brother John Ryan. The firm operated for over forty years and developed large sections of the Intercolonial Railway; the Canadian Pacific Railway; the Brockville and Ottawa Railway; the Red River Valley Railway; the Pembina St. Boniface line; as well as contracts in Michigan, Kentucky, and Illinois.

== Establishment ==
The firm was founded in 1855 by prominent Irish-Canadian brothers Hugh Ryan and John Ryan following their move to Perth, Ontario from Montreal, Quebec, in the early 1850s. The brainchild of Hugh, the firm expanded the builder's expert knowledge of railway construction acquired under his mentor, Canadian engineer Sir Casimir Gzowski.

Given Hugh's early experience working on the St. Lawrence and Atlantic Railway, he served as the firm's CEO, while John, a more managerial talent, acted as the firm's chairman —the brothers would hold these respective positions for the next forty years.

With the founding of H. & J. Ryan predating the Canadian Confederation by more than a decade, the firm played an "active role in the industrialisation of a fledgling nation;" which only expanded once the Canadian Pacific Railway was formally established under Prime Minister Sir John A. Macdonald.

== Building projects ==
The following list is in chronological order:

=== Brockville & Ottawa Railway ===
In 1858 H. & J. Ryan was awarded the contract by the Ontario government for large portions of the Brockville and Ottawa Railway, specifically the section running from Smiths Fall's to Perth; as well as the section running from Arnprior and Bonnechere. The firm was also responsible for constructing the state-of-the-art turntable; a feature which allows engines to be turned so that they face the right direction for a new assignment.

=== The United States of America ===
Due to shortages of domestic railway contractors operating during the American Civil War, H. & J. Ryan was able to expand in the American market beginning in 1861 and monopolise several lucrative contracts in Illinois, Michigan, Maine, and Kentucky —including the Chicago and Alton Railway.

=== Kaministiquia Railway ===
In October 1877, H. & J. Ryan was retained to perform an extensive quality and safety assessment of the Kaministiquia Railway and Prince Arthur's Landing by the Commissioner of Public Works of Ontario. The assessment, penned by Hugh Ryan, was presented to the Canadian Senate and was foundational to the governments eventual decision to acquire both assets.

=== Bridges & Pembina St. Boniface line ===
In 1880, Sir Charles Tupper and Manitoba provincial government awarded H. & J. Ryan the contracts for the new Pembina St. Boniface line track, including 100 miles northwest of Winnipeg. The contracts also included bridge development in Manitoba; most notably a bridge across the Red River to connected the west and east portions of the Pembina St. Boniface line.

=== Bridges & Red River Valley Railway ===
The firm's largest development contracts were awarded by Manitoba Premier John Norquay in 1887 for the controversial Red River Valley Railway, later known as the St Paul Minneapolis and Manitoba Railway, to connect Manitoba and Minnesota. Valued at $750,000, the tender included the construction of both bridges and railway lines —with the lines requiring in excess of 6,000 tons of steel rails to be completed. When the Manitoba government became delinquent on payments to H. & J. Ryan, due to a dispute with the federal government, the firm brought legal proceedings against Manitoba for the outstanding remuneration and was ultimately awarded $50,000.

== Relevant images ==
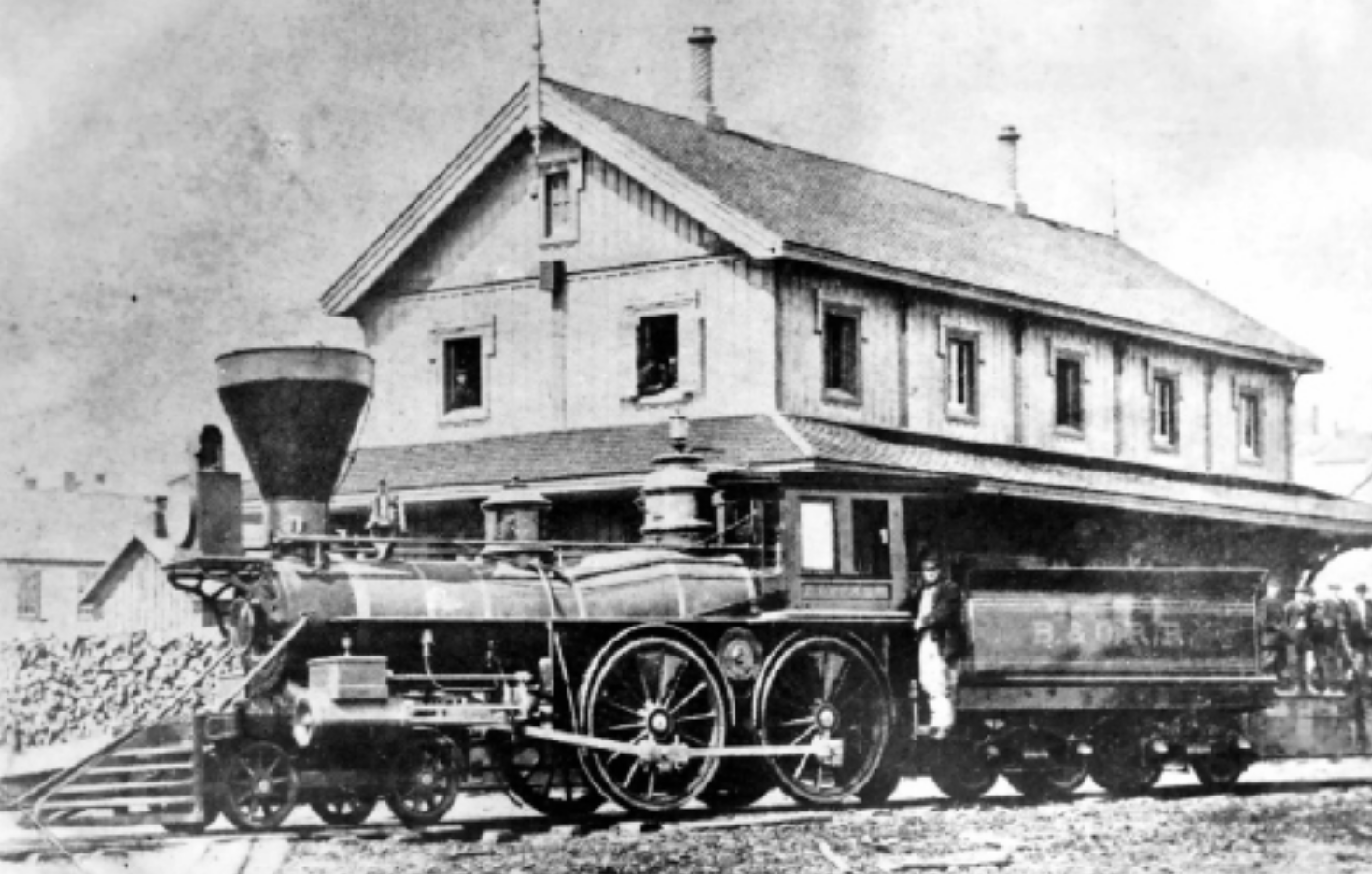
Smith Falls Railway Station built by H. & J. Ryan in the late 1850s.

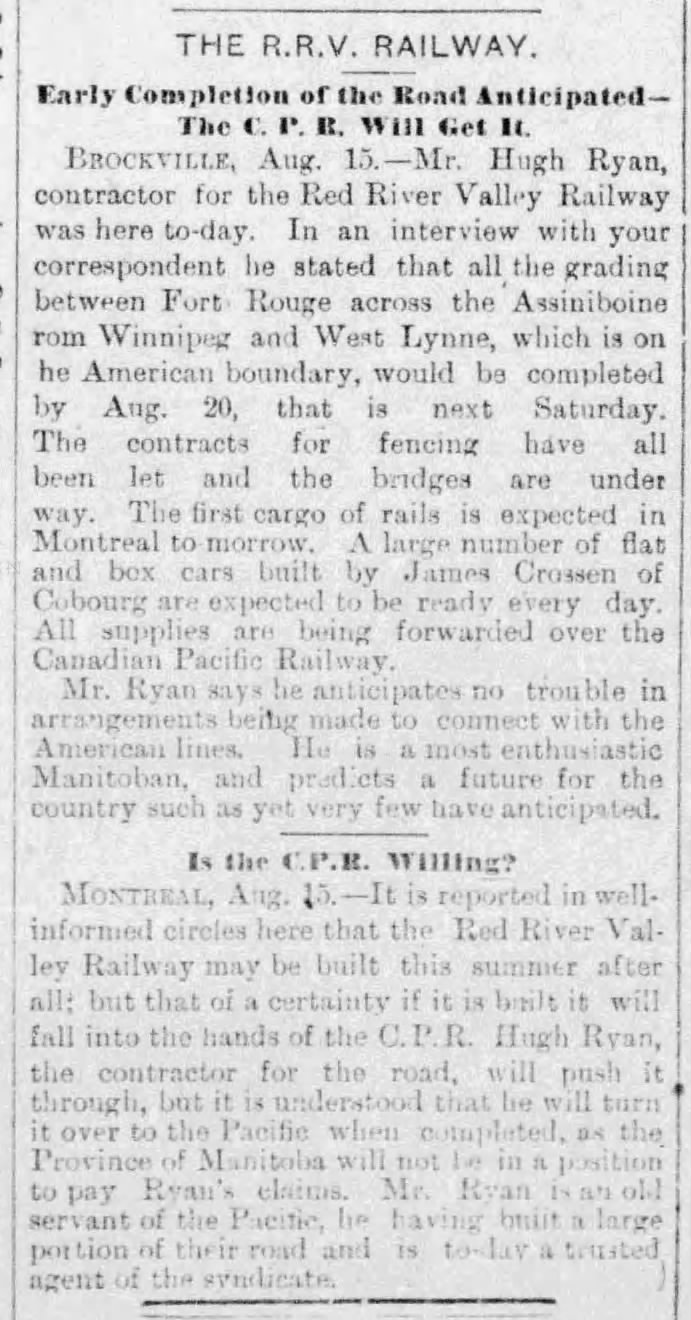
A newspaper profile of the Red River Valley Railway being built by Hugh Ryan's firm H.& J. Ryan in The Brantford Daily Expositor, 1887

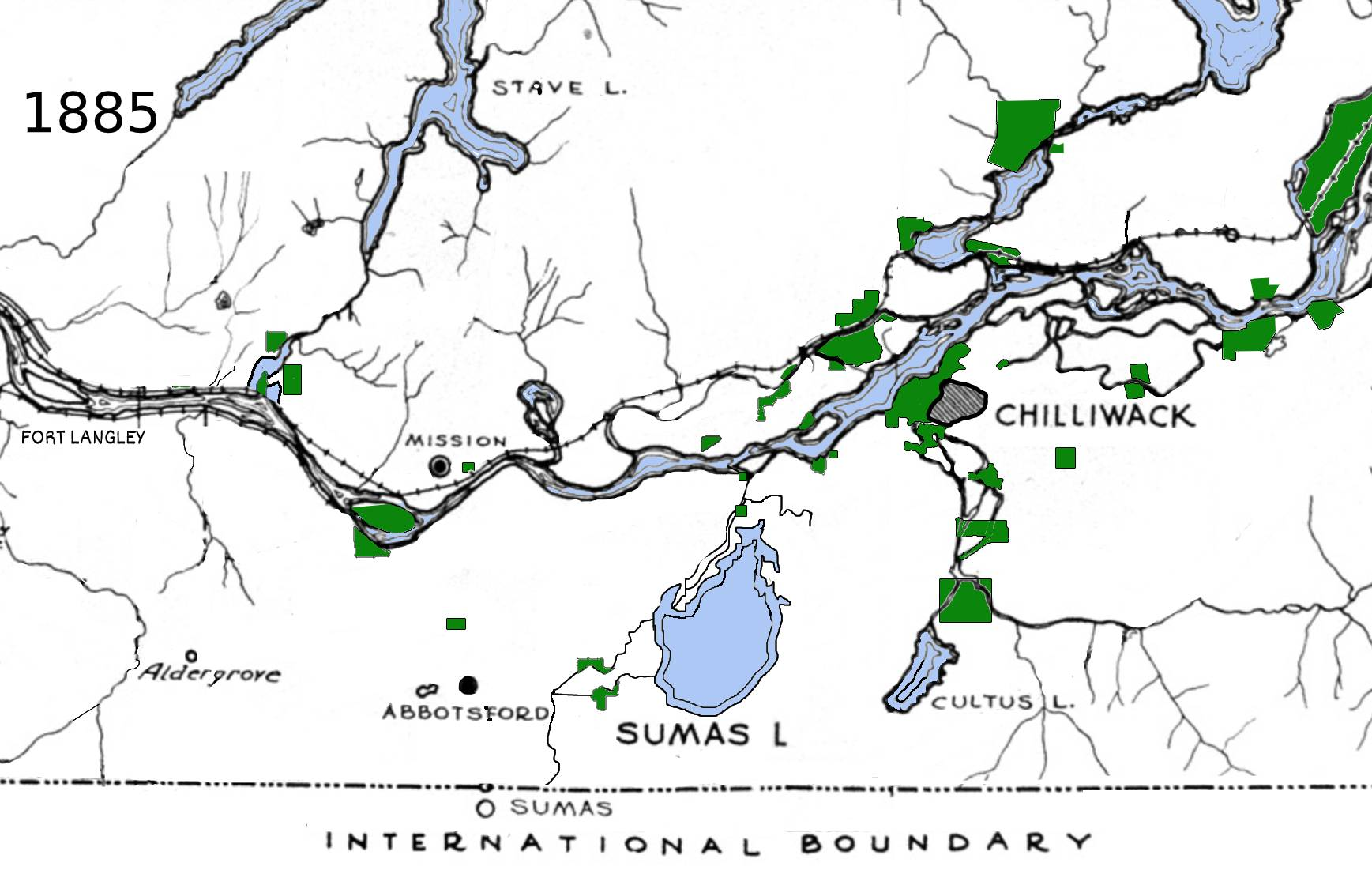
The Canadian Pacific Railway was completed in 1885, with large sections in Ottawa and Brockville built by H. & J. Ryan.

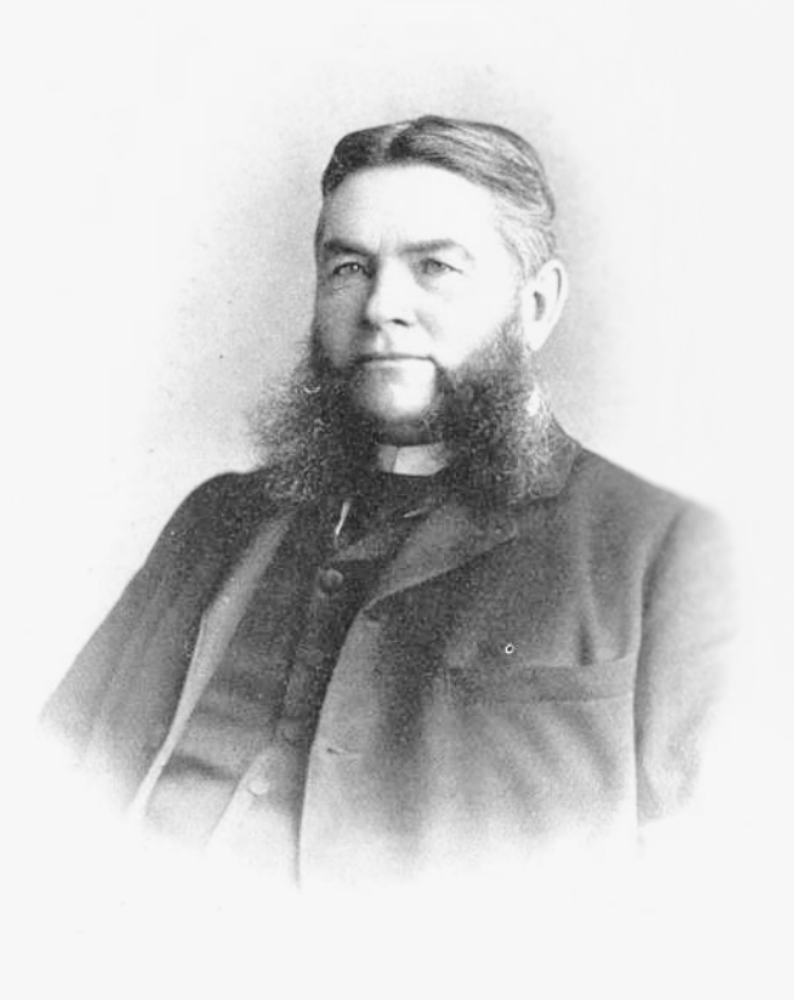
Portrait of Canadian railway magnate and builder Hugh Ryan, the founder and CEO of H. & J. Ryan.

Portrait of Canadian railway magnate John Ryan, chairman of H. & J. Ryan.
