= Emma Shaw Colcleugh =

American author (1846–1940)

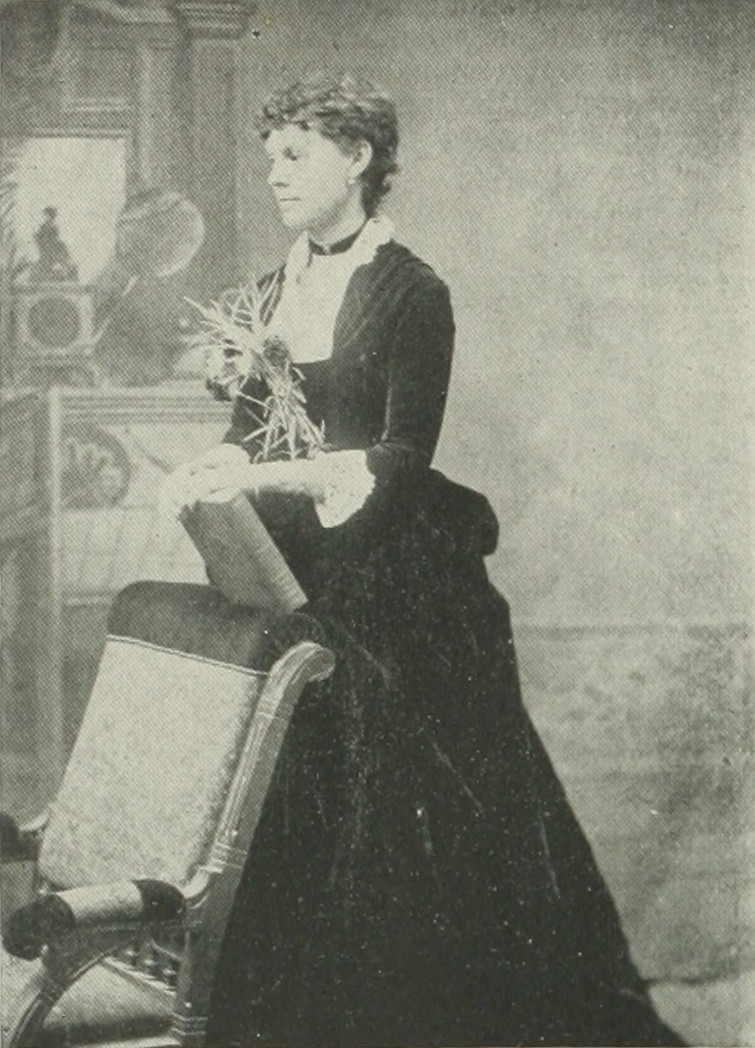
- Photo in A Woman of the Century
- Born: Emma Shaw; September 3, 1846; Thompson, Connecticut, US
- Died: January 29, 1940 (aged 93); St. Petersburg, Florida
- Occupation: Author
- Spouse: Frederick Colcleugh
- Writing career
- Genres: travel writing; poetry

Emma Shaw Colcleugh (née, Shaw; September 3, 1846 – January 29, 1940) was an American author who lectured, traveled, and collected artifacts. Starting in 1895, she was a book reviewer and edited a department in The Providence Journal. She was a frequent contributor to the Boston Evening Transcript as well as several other prominent papers, her writings having attracted widespread attention. Her travel writing was sponsored by New England newspapers, which published her reports. Also a poet, her first poem was "New Year's Eve". Colcleugh was also the author of "World Wide Wisdom Words", a yearbook of proverbs. Colcleugh's lectures regarding travels included "Up the Saskatchewan", "Through Hawaii with a Kodak", and "From Ocean to Ocean". She sold over 200 of the artifacts she collected during her travels to Rudolf F. Haffenreffer; these are held by the Haffenreffer Museum of Anthropology. Two islands in the Mackenzie River are named in her honor. Agnes Deans Cameron, Elizabeth Taylor, and Clara Coltman Rogers Vyvyan were Colcleugh's contemporaries in traveling through the Western Arctic. She affiliated with several clubs, including the New England Woman's Press Association, Rhode Island Woman's Club, Providence Fortnightly Club, Providence Mothers' Club, Sarah E. Doyle Club, and the Unity Club.

== Early life and education ==
Emma Shaw was born in Thompson, Connecticut, September 3, 1846, the second child of George W. and Abbey (Carpenter) Shaw. Her siblings included Rosamond (1844–1847), Julia (1850–1909), George E., Edward (b. 1857). She was educated in a private school in Thompson until 1862.

== Career ==
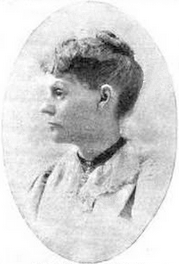
Emma Shaw Colcleugh

=== Teacher ===
In 1862, she became a teacher of country schools. She taught until 1872, when she made her home in Providence, Rhode Island. She taught there as well, rising to a high position.

=== Traveler, correspondent, lecturer ===
In 1881, she began her literary and lecturing career as a part of her travels. Cameron, Taylor, and Vyvyan were Colcleugh's contemporaries in Western Arctic travel. She went in 1881 on a trip to the Northwest, for the purpose of regaining her strength. Her tour of the Great Lakes and the Mississippi became the subject of a series of sketches in the Providence "Press". She made other trips in the following years, and each time she described her journeys in a series of articles. In 1884, she published a series of illustrated articles in the "Journal of Education", continuing from February till June, after which she visited Alaska, and then delivered a lecture on that area before clubs and lyceums. In 1885, she revisited Alaska, returning via the Yellowstone National Park. She traveled in the West extensively in 1886–87, and in 1888, she extended her journeys into Canada, penetrating the Hudson's Bay Company's country, where no other reporter had ventured. During her Subarctic travels, she encountered Athapaskan and Algonquian speakers, such as the Cree, Chipewyan, and Slavey people. Her articles on that, as well as her wanderings for the next five years, made her name well known to the readers of the Boston Transcript. Her travels were sponsored by New England newspapers, which published her reports.

The years 1889, 1891, and 1892 found her exploring unfrequented areas in British America and the Queen Charlotte Islands. In 1890, she visited all the Hawaiian Islands, which furnished material for a long series of articles as well as for several illustrated lectures. She traveled to Porto Rico, immediately after the hurricane, and went into Central Africa in 1902 (before the Uganda railway was completed) as the special correspondent. She went to South America during the winter of 1910–11, the second time at the request of the Hamburg-American Co. to give a series of talks on South America on shipboard. Her lectures were entitled "Up the Saskatchewan," "Through Hawaii with a Kodak" and "From Ocean to Ocean."

Of her picnic with Tahitians, she was to say, "To tell just how this was brought about would involve a long story of a disabled steamer, rescue by natives, long days of waiting in one of the Tahitian villages upon the beautiful island of Morea, and the final chartering of a row-boat and crew of Tahitians, to hurry me to Papeete, 25 miles (40 km) away, in time for the sailing of the steamer for New Zealand..." She described a "pathetic incident" during her trip to the Yukon and Northwest Territory, "I saw an Indian woman whose husband had deserted her for a fairer squaw, and she with her babe on her back had in the dead of winter made her way alone almost a hundred miles from their wilderness hunting-ground to the Hudson Bay Fort (at the Peel River, about 64 degrees north), knowing well that there she would be cared for. So she was, but her condition was pitiful. Both breasts frozen, and almost famished, she had managed to keep alive her little one and drag herself to the post enclosure, where they had difficulty in restoring her. When I saw her, her recreant husband was with her, and from her devotion to him, one would scarcely believe she had been so cruelly treated by him. Women's hearts are about the same, are they not, the world over, whether the skin be fair or dusky?" Her travels in central Africa were covered by the Boston Transcript. Her tour took her thousands of miles into places never before trod by a European woman. Contrary to the advice of her friends, who attempted to dissuade her from the expedition, Colcleugh sailed from New York City in May 1902 for Mombasa, where she boarded the Uganda railway to Lake Victoria, Nyanza Province. Arrived at Mombasa, she was strongly advised not to attempt the journey over the new railroad, as for the last 50 miles (80 km) there were only temporary tracks, liable at any time to give way and derail the train, but Colcleugh was not to be dissuaded and she arrived at the lake in good time. Crossing in a small lake steamer to Mengo, Uganda, she made that the central point from which to conduct short expeditions through the surrounding country for study of the conditions and the peoples, and she brought home many valuable and interesting relics.

More than 200 of Colcleugh's artifacts were sold to Rudolf F. Haffenreffer in 1930, and they are now held by the Haffenreffer Museum of Anthropology in Bristol, Rhode Island. This includes a basket with a rattle lid, collected between 1884 and 1889.

=== Writer ===
Colcleugh published her first poem, "New Year's Eve," in 1883. She was the author of "World Wide Wisdom Words" (a yearbook of proverbs gleaned in Central Africa, the South Seas, South America, and Europe) and "Alaskan Gleanings". She edited a department in the Providence Journal since 1895. For six years, she reviewed books for the Providence Journal along lines of travel and ethnology. Her letters from Cuba at the time of the Spanish–American War appeared in the Providence Journal, Boston Transcript, New York Evening Post, and other periodicals.

== "Nahanni" ==
The poem "Nahanni" was written, on a steamer as Colcleugh was passing mountains along the South Nahanni River.

No single peaks, no mountains lone,
But one unbroken wall of stone,
Its topmost crags all robed in mist,
Its granite feet by billows kissed.
Soft clouds above, the stream below,
Dark, grim depths that plainly show
The scars where Spring's impetuous tide
Rolled downward to Mackenzie wide.
The mountain torrents dash along,
Streamlets at first, then rivers strong,
When the Frost-King loses hold
And Summer's sun succeeds the cold.
When icy fetters chain no more,
And streams are free from shore to shore.
O'er rocky bastion, turrets gray,
The fleecy cloudlets tirelessly play.
Till weird effects of light and shade
On adamantine walls are made.
The walls a mighty fortress stand
Guarding in strength "the Wild North Land,"
And keeping watch as to the sea
The great Mackenzie wanders free.
Once, only, ope the portals wide
That the Na' silver tide
May add a tributary mite,
Stealing beneath a bare bold height,
To lose itself in grander stream.
I've watched the sunset's ruddy gleam
Grow pale, then slowly die away
Behind the heights at close of day.
I've watched the somber shadows fall
Upon this time-old mountain wall;
I've seen it flashing in the dawn,
Or radiant in full light of morn.
Each, all alike, have charms for me,
nd oft in memory shall I see,
When distant far from this lone land,
The pictures of this mountain grand.

== Personal life ==
In 1893, she married Frederick Colcleugh, Member of the Provincial Parliament of Manitoba. They divorced in 1897. She was a member of the New England Women's Press Association; honorary member of the Rhode Island Woman's Club, Providence Fortnightly Club, Providence Mothers' Club, Sarah E. Doyle Club, Unity Club. She was a Congregationalist by religion, and was against woman suffrage.

Colcleugh died in Florida in 1940.

== Awards and honors ==
Colcleugh Island, which lies between Fort Norman and Fort Wrigley on the Mackenzie River, and Emma Island were named in her honor.

== Selected works ==
- Schools in Newfoundland
- A flying visit to Kauai (1896)
- An object lesson in history. An historical exercise for school exhibitions (1896)

== Gallery ==
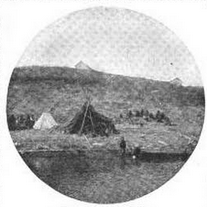
Eskimo summer residence

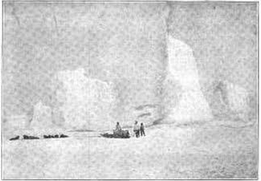
Dog train in the western Arctic

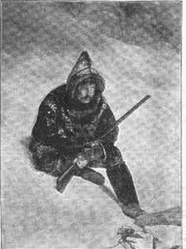
Mr. Wilson of the Hudson's Bay Company in hunting attire
