= Thomas Norquay =

Canadian politician

Thomas Norquay (January 26, 1843 – June 9, 1892) was a farmer, teacher and political figure in Manitoba. He represented Kildonan from 1890 to 1892 in the Legislative Assembly of Manitoba as a Conservative.

He was born in St. Andrews, Rupert's Land the son of John Norquay, Senior and brother of John Norquay, and was educated there and at St. John's College. In 1866, Norquay married Elizabeth Miller. He served on the municipal council for St. Andrews and was reeve from 1888 to 1889. Norquay was elected to the provincial assembly in an 1890 by-election held following the death of his brother. He died due to a railway accident in Winnipeg.
