= James Huston (Canadian politician) =

Canadian politician

James Huston (March 15, 1845 – May 19, 1922) was a businessman and political figure in Manitoba. He represented Manitou in 1892 in the Legislative Assembly of Manitoba as a Liberal.

He was born in Canada East and came to Manitoba, opening a general store in Manitou. He married Hattie Andrews. Huston was elected to the Manitoba assembly in an 1892 by-election held following the death of William Winram. He was defeated by Robert Ironside in the general election that followed later that year. In 1893, Huston was named postmaster at Manitou and served until his death there at the age of 77. In 1913, he was named president of the Manitoba Postmasters' Association. Huston also served as president of the Manitou Board of Trade.
