= John Gunn (Manitoba politician) =

Canadian politician

John Gunn (August 8, 1825 – September 10, 1898) was a farmer, teacher and political figure in Manitoba. He represented St. Andrews from 1874 to 1879 in the Legislative Assembly of Manitoba.

He was born in the Red River Colony, the son of Donald Gunn, and was home-schooled. Gunn taught at St. John's Day School from 1845 to 1847. He built a mill on Gunn's Creek which played an important role in the early development of the community of Lockport. In 1855, he married Emma Garrioch. Gunn served as school trustee and was also secretary-treasurer for the school board. He was defeated when he ran for reelection to the Manitoba assembly in 1879 and 1883.
