= David Spence (Manitoba politician) =

Canadian politician

David Spence (September 5, 1824 – September 16, 1885) was a political figure in Manitoba. He represented Poplar Point from 1870 to 1874 in the Legislative Assembly of Manitoba.

He was born in the Red River Colony, the son of James Spence and Jane Morwick, who was grandmother to John Norquay. In 1844, Spence married Catherine Hallett at St. John's; she was the daughter of Henry Hallett and Catherine Parenteau, and died in 1880. He represented the parish of St. Anne's at the Convention of Forty, a parliament organized by Louis Riel in 1870. Spence was elected the first MLA for Poplar Point on December 27, 1870, and served as justice of the peace for Poplar Point and Marquette. In 1876, Métis scrip was issued to David and Catherine, and the family moved to lot 62 at Poplar Point the following year. He was accidentally shot in his home by a neighbour, who thought his gun was not loaded, which led to his death from his wound.
