= Frederick Bird (politician) =

Canadian politician

Member of the Legislative Assembly of Manitoba for Portage la Prairie
- In office 1870–1874

Personal details
- Born: March 18, 1823
- Died: November 30, 1884 (aged 61)

Frederick Adolphus Bird (March 18, 1823 – November 30, 1884) was a political figure in Manitoba. He represented Portage la Prairie from 1870 to 1874 in the Legislative Assembly of Manitoba.

He was born in Carleton, Rupert's Land and educated in the Red River Colony. Bird married Ann Garriock.

He died in Portage la Prairie at the age of 61.
