= Alfred Boyd =

Canadian politician (1835–1908)

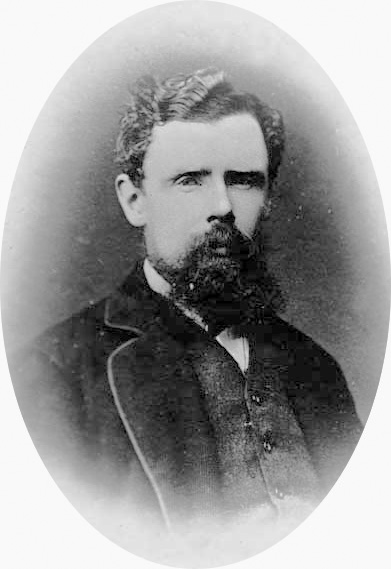

1st Premier of Manitoba
- In office September 16, 1870 – December 14, 1871
- Monarch: Victoria
- Lieutenant Governor: Adams George Archibald
- Preceded by: None
- Succeeded by: Marc-Amable Girard

Member of the Legislative Assembly of Manitoba for St. Andrews North
- In office December 27, 1870 – December 23, 1874
- Preceded by: District created
- Succeeded by: John Gunn

Personal details
- Born: September 20, 1835 England
- Died: August 16, 1908 (aged 72) England
- Occupation: Politician; businessman

Alfred Boyd (September 20, 1835 – August 16, 1908) was a politician in Manitoba, Canada, who is usually considered to have been the first premier of Manitoba (1870–1871) though he was not recognized by that title at the time and was not the real leader of the government. He is more correctly referred to as the first Provincial Secretary of Manitoba. (Some modern sources list his official title as "Chief Minister", but that does not appear in parliamentary documents from the period and is apparently a more recent invention.)

== Life ==
Boyd's origins are obscure. Born in England, he may have arrived in Rupert's Land as early as 1858. He established himself as a merchant and trader in Red River Colony and appears to have become wealthy by the time of the 1869 Red River Rebellion.

Boyd had little involvement in public life until January 1870, when he was elected for St. Andrew's to the "Convention of Forty" (a parliament called by Louis Riel to decide the fate of the Red River Colony). Boyd refused to vote for Riel as the Convention's leader and spoke in favour of territorial status (Riel favoured provincial status). Riel later referred to Boyd as an enemy.

With the end of the rebellion and the subsequent incorporation of Manitoba as a Canadian province (July 15, 1870), Lieutenant Governor Adams George Archibald (1870–1872) named Boyd as his Provincial Secretary. Archibald considered Boyd to be acceptable to the French population of the province, as well as to its English-speaking "mixed-blood" Anglo-Metis residents (i.e. persons of British and aboriginal descent). Boyd was elected for the riding of St. Andrew's North in Manitoba's first provincial election (December 27, 1870), defeating fellow government-supporter Donald Gunn by 58 votes to 28.

Archibald chose his first full cabinet in January 1871. Boyd, now the Minister of Public Works and Minister of Agriculture, served with Marc-Amable Girard, James McKay, Henry Hynes Clarke and Thomas Howard, a cabinet that reflected the province's ethnic, religious and linguistic diversity. Archibald, the real Premier, frequently determined matters of policy without seeking advice from his ministers.

In office, Boyd faced many challenges from his constituents. was criticised for inaction by new Ontario immigrants who were settling in the province, as there was a need for bridges and jails (among other things). He was also criticized by his constituents for supporting public works construction in the French-Canadian community of St. Boniface and voting to incorporate the Roman Catholic Diocese of St. Boniface Faced with those pressures, Boyd resigned his position on December 9, 1871.

In resigning, Boyd called for "English mixed-blood" representation at the cabinet level. He was replaced by "mixed-blood" MLA John Norquay, as such.

Boyd was appointed to the Temporary North-West Council in 1872 and remained a member until the Council's dissolution. He briefly rejoined the Manitoba executive as the province's first Minister of Education (March–October 1873). After resigning a second time, he did not seek re-election in 1874.

Boyd is thought to have left in 1889 for England where he purchased several properties. By 1902, he resided in Pimlico and owned land in Essex. On his death in 1908, his estate was valued at 83,000 pounds.
