= Frederick Colcleugh =

Canadian politician

Frederick William Colcleugh
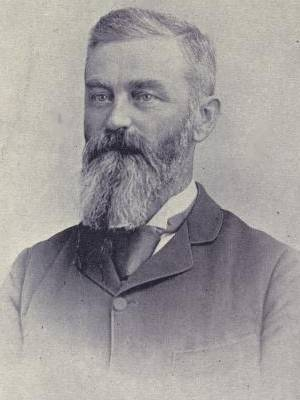

Member of the Legislative Assembly of Manitoba for St. Andrews
- In office 1888–1896

Personal details
- Born: 1845; West Flamborough, Ontario
- Died: 1907; Winnipeg, Manitoba

Frederick William Colcleugh (1845 – 1907) was a merchant and political figure in Manitoba. He represented St. Andrews from 1888 to 1896 in the Legislative Assembly of Manitoba as a Liberal.

He was born in West Flamborough, Wentworth County, Canada West, the son of Walter Colcleugh, a native of Scotland, and Sarah Kirkpatrick, and was educated in Dundas and Picton. Colcleugh studied law and passed the Ontario Law Society examination but then went on to apprentice as a clerk. He established a business in Carlisle which he sold in 1874, moving to Manitoba. In 1865, Colcleugh married Isabella Nichol; she died in 1880. He served on the town council for Selkirk and was mayor in 1886 and 1888. Colcleugh ran unsuccessfully for a seat in the Manitoba assembly in 1886 before being elected in 1888.

He was president of the Manitoba Hail Insurance Company and of the Lake Winnipeg Lumber Trading and Transfer Company, and also of the St. Andrew's Agricultural Society. In 1893, Colcleugh married Emma Shaw; the couple divorced in 1897. He died in Winnipeg.
