= Henry Joseph Clarke =

Canadian politician

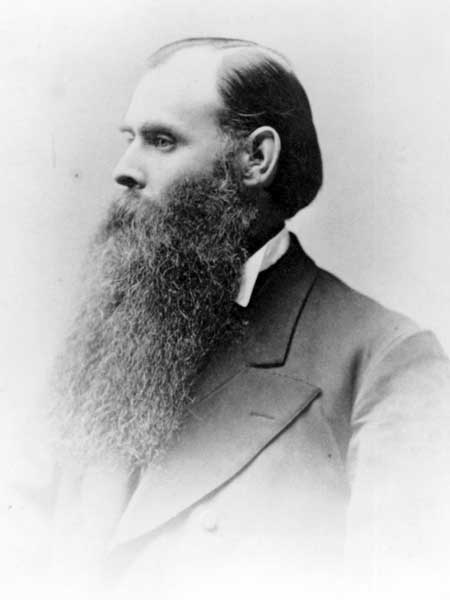

3rd Premier of Manitoba
- In office March 14, 1872 – July 8, 1874
- Monarch: Queen Victoria
- Lieutenant Governor: Adams George Archibald; Alexander Morris
- Preceded by: Marc-Amable Girard
- Succeeded by: Marc-Amable Girard

Member of the Legislative Assembly of Manitoba for St. Charles
- In office December 27, 1870 – December 23, 1874
- Preceded by: District created
- Succeeded by: Alexander Murray

Personal details
- Born: July 7, 1833 Donegal, United Kingdom of Great Britain and Ireland
- Died: September 13, 1889 (aged 56) near Medicine Hat, Alberta
- Spouse: Maria Merrick Sinclair (m. 1871)
- Relations: Liberal-Conservative
- Education: Collège Sainte-Marie
- Occupation: lawyer
- Profession: politician
- Cabinet: Attorney-General (1871–1874)

Henry Joseph Clarke (July 7, 1833 – September 13, 1889), who sometimes used the middle names Hynes and O'Connell, was a lawyer and politician in Manitoba, Canada.

Born in Donegal (now in Ireland) on July 7, 1833, Clarke moved with his family to Canada at age three. He practiced law in Montreal, Lower Canada, before moving to California during the "gold rush" of 1858, and also lived in El Salvador for a period in the early 1860s. He returned to Montreal after this time, and developed a strong reputation as a criminal lawyer.

Clarke ran for Province of Canada's parliament as a Liberal-Conservative in the 1863 election, losing to Liberal finance minister Luther Hamilton Holton in the riding of Chateauguay. In 1867, he wrote a short biography of fellow Irish Catholic politician Thomas D'Arcy McGee.

On the advice of George-Étienne Cartier and Bishop Alexandre-Antonin Taché, Clarke moved to Manitoba in 1870 to assist in the establishment of a provincial government. He was elected by acclamation for the constituency of St. Charles in Manitoba's first general election, held on December 27, 1870. He was then appointed as the province's first Attorney General on January 3, 1871. In this capacity, he took a leading role in establishing the province's legal system.

Clarke had a poor personal relationship with Lt. Governor Adams George Archibald (1870–1872), who considered him intemperate and unduly ambitious. There were serious policy disagreements between Clarke and the Lieutenant Governors, most notably over the makeup of Manitoba's supreme court: Clarke wanted three justices to serve on the court, while Archibald preferred only a single justice. This division became a serious dispute in the province, largely due to Clarke's refusal to accept a compromise. Federal prime minister John A. Macdonald eventually intervened, and established a court with a single justice.

Clarke also wanted departmental control over the number of lawyers in Manitoba. In 1871, he navigated a bill through the assembly which would have restricted the number of out-of-province lawyers to ten, and given the Attorney General's office final authority over who could practice. This measure was opposed by Archibald, and was overridden by the federal government.

Clarke was a political spokesman for those members of Manitoba's Métis community who opposed the leadership of Louis Riel. As such, he was opposed by both "ultra-loyalists" among the English and by Riel's more numerous supporters among the Métis, and frequently clashed with fellow cabinet member Joseph Royal, a political spokesman for the latter group. When three Métis were arrested on charges of treason following Fenian raids in 1871, Clarke personally led the prosecution while Royal acted at the chief defense lawyer. Two of the defendants were acquitted, and one was convicted.

In the Canadian general election of 1872, Clarke stood as a candidate against Riel in the riding of Provencher. However, both candidates resigned to allow the acclamation of George-Étienne Cartier following the latter's defeat in Montreal.

Clarke was a provincial representative to Ottawa in 1871 and 1873, for meetings on immigration and "better terms" for the province.

In 1873, Clarke publicly defended Lord Gordon Gordon, an English trader and con-man who claimed to be a Scottish lord, and made a fortune in investment fraud. The revelation of Gordon's true identity was an embarrassment for Clarke.

The ministry which included Clarke was defeated in the legislature in July 1874, when John Norquay's bill for electoral redistribution was defeated. Clarke resigned as Attorney General, and returned to California. While stopping over in Minnesota, he was beset upon by a group of investors who ran been defrauded by Gordon Gordon, and was seriously injured.

He returned to Winnipeg in 1877, and ran unsuccessfully for the constituency of Rockwood in the provincial elections of 1878 and 1879. Previously a supporter of French language rights, Clarke was by this time campaigning against bilingualism and state funding for Catholic schools. Despite this, he later defended twenty-five followers of Louis Riel in court, after the second Riel Rebellion of 1885. Clarke died near Medicine Hat in 1889, while travelling by train.

Clarke is sometimes listed as the third Premier of Manitoba, but this is inaccurate. Like his "predecessors" Alfred Boyd and Marc-Amable Girard, Clarke was simply a leading minister in a cabinet controlled by the province's Lieutenant Governors. Morris, in fact, rejected Clarke's request to be recognized as Premier in 1873. Some modern sources list Clarke as having been the "Chief Minister" of Manitoba from 1872 to 1874, but he was not described by this title at the time; the term appears to be a more recent invention. Clarke was, however, acknowledged as the government leader in the legislature from 1871 to 1874.
