= Donald Gunn =

Canadian politician

- Born: September 1797; Caithness, Scotland
- Died: 30 November 1878 (aged 81); St. Andrew's, Manitoba, Canada
- Occupations: businessman, judge, astronomer, politician
- Children: George Gunn

Donald Gunn (September 1797 – 30 November 1878) was a Scottish-Canadian businessman, judge, astronomer and politician. He was a member of the Manitoba Provincial Legislative Council (which he helped to abolish).

Gunn was born in Halkirk, Caithness, Scotland, in 1797. His father was William Gunn in Braehour who was brother to Donald Gunn the sennachie in Braehour of Brawlbin who married Catherine Gunn in Osclay. She was the great granddaughter of Donald Crotach Gunn who was Chief of the Clan Gunn. Donald (Manitoba) Gunn married Margaret Swain (who was born in Rupert's Land) in 1819; they had many children. Donald had a brother called William Gunn of Waranga, Victoria, Australia.

Donald worked in the Canadian North West for the Hudson's Bay Company between 1813 and 1823, and was subsequently a Judge on the Court of Petty Sessions in Red River. He also wrote for the Smithsonian Institution and the Institute of Rupert's Land, and was a member of the Board of Management for Manitoba College (a Presbyterian institution).

Gunn was one of the earliest contributors to the Smithsonian Institution in the field of astronomy.

Gunn was a supporter of Canadian Confederation and the Government of Adams George Archibald. In Manitoba's first general election (27 December 1870), he ran against Provincial Secretary and fellow Archibald-supporter Alfred Boyd. He was defeated by 58 votes to 28.

Gunn was appointed to the Province's new Legislative Council on 15 March 1871, one of seven members. In 1876, he supported the decision of the Robert A. Davis government to abolish the institution.

Donald Gunn died in 1878 in St. Andrew's, Manitoba.
