= Robert Atkinson Davis =

Canadian politician

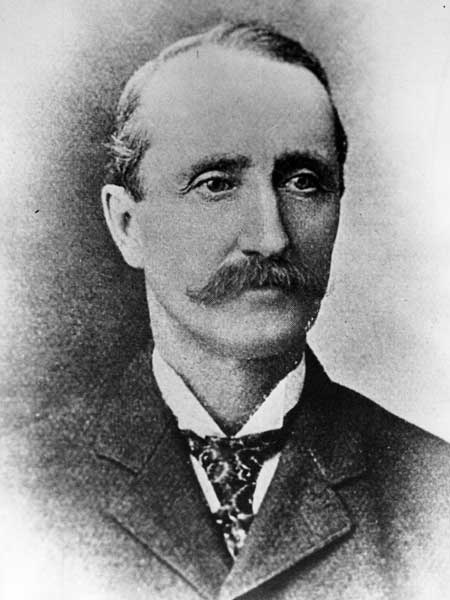

4th Premier of Manitoba
- In office December 3, 1874 – October 16, 1878
- Monarch: Victoria
- Lieutenant Governor: Alexander Morris; Joseph-Édouard Cauchon
- Preceded by: Marc-Amable Girard
- Succeeded by: John Norquay

Member of the Legislative Assembly of Manitoba for Winnipeg and St. John
- In office April 1, 1874 – December 23, 1874
- Preceded by: Donald Alexander Smith
- Succeeded by: District renamed

Member of the Legislative Assembly of Manitoba for Winnipeg
- In office December 23, 1874 – December 18, 1878
- Preceded by: District renamed
- Succeeded by: Thomas Scott

Personal details
- Born: March 9, 1841 Dudswell, Lower Canada
- Died: January 7, 1903 (aged 61) Phoenix, Arizona
- Party: Government
- Spouses: Susan Augusta True (m. 1870) Elizabeth McGonagil (m. 1876)
- Children: 2
- Education: McGill University
- Occupation: schoolteacher, businessman
- Profession: politician
- Cabinet: Provincial Treasurer (1874–1878)

Robert Atkinson Davis (March 9, 1841 – January 7, 1903) was a businessman and Manitoba politician who served as the fourth premier of Manitoba.

Davis was born in Dudswell, in the eastern townships of Lower Canada (now Quebec). As a young man, he worked in the mining fields of the US Rockies. He moved to Red River on 10 May 1870, and reportedly had a friendly meeting with Louis Riel shortly before the end of the Red River Rebellion. This meeting took place after Davis swam across the Red River to where Riel was hiding and called out to the guards in French, and the entire meeting took place in French as Davis was bilingual. Davis purchased a hotel in September 1870. This investment proved very profitable, and he was soon able to open several other stores in Winnipeg.

Davis assumed a significant role in Manitoba politics after the death of his first wife in 1872. He emerged as a spokesman for the province's recent Ontario immigrants, who opposed the Hudson's Bay Company's monopoly on transportation and opposed the continued prominence of the Métis in Manitoba politics.

Davis challenged HBC commissioner Donald Alexander Smith for the Presidency of the Provincial Agricultural Association in 1872. He lost this race, but was elected to both the Protestant school board and the new Winnipeg Board of Trade in February 1873. Davis also helped create the Manitoba society called "The Grange" in 1874.

In April 1874, Davis won a by-election to the provincial legislature for the riding of Winnipeg & St. Johns (replacing Smith, who had resigned). He soon emerged as a leading figure in the opposition, and on July 2, 1874, supported a no-confidence motion which brought down the government. The next day, Marc-Amable Girard was called to lead a ministry based on principles of "responsible government". Davis became the Provincial Treasurer and sought to achieve debt elimination and "better terms" from Ottawa.

The Girard government fell apart in November–December 1874 as a result of ethnic tensions. Davis, the only minister not to resign during this crisis, was called upon to form a new government. He was 33 years old. Like his predecessors, he recognized the importance of demographic balance and appointed French-Canadian Joseph Royal as his Provincial Secretary.

Davis was re-elected for Winnipeg in Manitoba's second general election (December 30, 1874), defeating Thomas Scott (not to be confused with the Thomas Scott executed by Louis Riel's provisional government) by 198 votes to 183. His ministry won the support of the "French party", but did not attain an overall majority in parliament until Davis formed a new alliance with former minister John Norquay. The Davis government was primarily opposed by the anglophone allies of John Christian Schultz, who were led in parliament by Orangeman Francis Cornish. Through his alliance with Royal, Davis could count on support from the "French party" throughout his term in office.

As premier, Davis continued his policy of debt reduction (for which he attained an increased Federal subsidy), and convinced the unelected Legislative Council to vote itself out of existence in January 1876. He supported a proposal that the planned transcontinental railway run through Winnipeg rather than Selkirk. After John A. Macdonald was re-elected as Canada's prime minister in 1878, this change was accomplished.

Davis resigned as premier in 1878, and subsequently became a successful businessman in Chicago. He argued in favour of Canada–US free trade in 1883, and spent much of the 1890s travelling on the profits of his business. He died of Bright's Disease in 1903 in Phoenix, Arizona.
