= Marc-Amable Girard =

Canadian politician

The Honourable Marc-Amable Girard
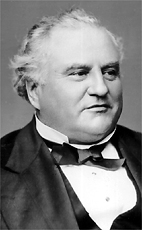

2nd Premier of Manitoba
- In office December 14, 1871 – March 14, 1872
- Monarch: Victoria
- Lieutenant Governor: Adams George Archibald
- Preceded by: Alfred Boyd
- Succeeded by: Henry Joseph Clarke
- In office July 8, 1874 – December 2, 1874
- Monarch: Victoria
- Lieutenant Governor: Alexander Morris
- Preceded by: Henry Joseph Clarke
- Succeeded by: Robert Atkinson Davis
Parliamentary constituencies
Member of the Legislative Assembly of Manitoba for St. Boniface East
In office December 27, 1870 – December 23, 1874
Preceded by	District created
Succeeded by	District merged
Member of the Legislative Assembly of Manitoba for St. Boniface
In office December 23, 1874 – December 18, 1878
Preceded by	District merged
Succeeded by	Alphonse LaRiviere
Member of the Legislative Assembly of Manitoba for Baie St. Paul
In office December 16, 1879 – January 23, 1883
Preceded by	Felix Chenier
Succeeded by	Edward Fairbanks
Canadian Senator from Manitoba
In office December 13, 1871 – September 12, 1892
Appointed by	John A. Macdonald

Personal details
- Born: April 25, 1822 Varennes, Lower Canada
- Died: September 12, 1892 (aged 70) Saint Boniface, Manitoba, Canada
- Party: Conservative
- Spouse: Marie-Aurélie de La Mothe (m. 1878)
- Children: 2
- Education: Collège de Saint-Hyacinthe
- Occupation: Lawyer; politician; notary
- Cabinet: Provincial Treasurer (1870–1872); Provincial Secretary (1874 & 1879–1881); Minister of Agriculture (1881–1883)

Marc-Amable Girard (April 25, 1822 – September 12, 1892) was the second premier of Manitoba, and the first Franco-Manitoban to hold that post. The Canadian Parliamentary Guide lists Girard as having been Premier (or Chief Minister) from 1871 to 1872, but he did not have this title at the time and was not the government leader. In 1874, however, Girard led Manitoba's first ministry to be constituted on principles of "responsible government". In this sense, he may be regarded as the first Premier of Manitoba.

== Early life ==
Girard was born in Varennes, Lower Canada (now Quebec).

== Political career ==
He worked as a Notary Public between 1844 and 1870, and was active in local political life (serving as Mayor of Varennes at one stage). He lost an electoral bid for the Province of Canada's Legislative Council in 1858, and a further bid for the Canadian Assembly in 1863 (losing to Parti Rouge leader A.A. Dorion in Hochelaga).

During the Riel Rebellion, Girard was sent to Manitoba by George-Étienne Cartier, leader of the Conservative Party's Quebec wing. Girard and Joseph Royal met with Riel on August 23, 1870, and may have encouraged his flight from Winnipeg before Canadian soldiers arrived the next day. Subsequently, Girard attempted to ensure that the new province remained open to French-Canadians.

Girard was appointed Provincial Treasurer by Lieutenant-Governor Adams George Archibald on September 16, 1870, and remained in this position until March 14, 1872. Archibald was effectively his own Premier during this period; Girard was his leading minister from the francophone community.

In Manitoba's first provincial election (December 27, 1870), Girard was elected by acclamation for the riding of St. Boniface East. He continued to hold his provincial seat after being appointed to the Senate of Canada on December 13, 1871, maintaining a controversial "dual mandate" for several years. (He resigned his cabinet seat soon after the Senate appointment, however.)

On December 28, 1872, Girard acquired a triple mandate being appointed to the Temporary North-West Council of Northwest Territories. He maintained an interest in the rights of French Canadians in the North West for the rest of his career.

By 1874, the Manitoba government was having difficulties maintaining its policy of "conciliation" among the province's ethnic, religious and linguistic groups. In June 1874, cabinet minister John Norquay attempted to redistribute Manitoba's electoral districts so as to reflect the increased English presence in the province. Norquay's bill was poorly drafted, however, and met opposition from both an opposition "English Party" under Edward Hay, and the "French Party" under Joseph Dubuc. On June 22, 1874, Girard voted with the French party on a non-confidence motion which brought down the government; he was called to form his own administration the next day.

Until July 3, 1874, the government of Manitoba had been dominated by the province's Lieutenant-Governors—Archibald (1870–1872), and his replacement Alexander Morris (1872–1877). Girard was the first elected official in Manitoba to choose his own cabinet and act as head of government.

Girard's government was founded on an unstable alliance with Hay's English party, and fell as a result of ongoing recriminations over Louis Riel's Red River Rebellion (1869–70). Girard and other members of the French caucus maintained regular communications with Riel between 1870 and 1874, an association which most English parliamentarians found unpalatable. In November 1874, Ambroise Lepine, the Adjutant-General in Riel's provisional government, was convicted of the murder of Orangeman Thomas Scott, who had been executed under Riel's authority in 1870. In the aftermath of this decision, Girard was abandoned by his English ministers and forced to resign. He was succeeded as Premier by Robert A. Davis on December 3, 1874.

During its brief existence, Girard's ministry promoted fiscal restraint and an effective system of auditing public accounts, also advocating the abolition of the unelected Legislative Council. It also passed a redistribution bill which allowed for 14 ridings with an English-speaking majority and 10 ridings with a French-speaking majority. Most considered this to be a fair compromise.

Girard was re-elected (again by acclamation) for the restructured riding of St. Boniface in Manitoba's second general election (December 30, 1874). The Davis government soon won the confidence of most elected members (formal party politics had not yet been introduced to Manitoba), and Girard played only a minor role in provincial politics for the next four years.

Girard intended to run for re-election in 1878, but was opposed by a "citizen's committee" which argued against his continued double mandate. This committee secured Alphonse LaRiviere's victory by acclamation (elections during this period were sometimes determined by public meetings, rather than formal balloting).

Subsequent events soon brought Girard back into cabinet. John Norquay succeeded Davis as Premier immediately prior to the 1878 election. Norquay initially won a working majority in the new parliament, but soon saw his government threatened by an alliance of Thomas Scott (not the same as above) and Joseph Royal. Norquay was only able to retain power by forming an alliance with the province's English MLA, and temporarily excluding French representatives from the cabinet.

The reconstituted Norquay ministry threatened to eliminate government bilingualism, and to redraw the electoral map to favour the English. Norquay recognized the continued need for conciliation, however, and secured Girard's return to cabinet as Provincial Secretary on November 18, 1879. Girard was probably at the height of his popularity with the French community during this period, securing a compromise on bilingualism and receiving guarantees on education and representation. He returned to the Manitoba legislature in the Province's fourth general election (December 16, 1879), being acclaimed for the riding of Baie St. Paul.

On November 16, 1881, Girard resigned as Provincial Secretary and became Minister of Agriculture and Statistics. He was unable to run in Manitoba's fifth general election (January 23, 1883) due to a recent legal change which made his "double mandate" illegal. He remained on the province's Executive Council until September 6, 1883, when he resigned.

Girard was a member of the Senate until his death (on September 12, 1892), where he supported the Conservative Party. He opposed the efforts of Thomas Greenway and D'Alton McCarthy to eliminate French-language services in Manitoba and the North West Territories, though he also condemned Louis Riel's second rebellion in 1885.
