= Edward Hay (politician) =

Canadian politician

Edward Henry George Gunter Hay (March 11, 1840 – November 25, 1918) was a businessman and political figure in Manitoba. He represented St. Andrews South from 1871 to 1874 as an independent member and St. Clements from 1879 to 1883 as an Independent-Liberal in the Legislative Assembly of Manitoba.

He was born in Hull, Yorkshire and worked as a machinist for several years. Hay went to New York City in 1858. In 1861, he came to Georgetown, Minnesota, where he helped to build the steamship International on the Red River. Hay moved to Fort Garry in 1863 and built a mill at St. Andrew's. He married Frances Gibson. Hay was defeated by John Norquay when he ran for reelection to the Manitoba assembly in 1874. He later moved to Portage la Prairie, where he built a foundry. He was a founding member of the Winnipeg Board of Trade. From 1900 to 1911, Hay was Clerk of Works at St. Andrew's Lock.

He was an unsuccessful candidate for the federal Lisgar riding in 1872 and 1874.

Hay died in Lockport.

== Electoral history ==
1872 Canadian federal election: Lisgar
Party	Candidate	Votes
Conservative	John Christian Schultz	273
Unknown	Edward Hay	128
Source: Canadian Elections Database

1874 Canadian federal election: Lisgar
Party	Candidate	Votes
Conservative	John Christian Schultz	285
Unknown	Edward Hay	216
lop.parl.ca
