= 1878 Manitoba general election =

- December 18, 1878

The 1878 Manitoba general election was held on December 18, 1878 to elect representatives to the Legislative Assembly of Manitoba.
