= John Christian Schultz =

Canadian Manitoba politician and businessman

The Honourable Sir John Christian Schultz KCMG
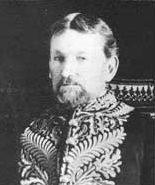

5th Lieutenant Governor of Manitoba
- In office July 1, 1888 – September 1, 1895
- Monarch: Victoria
- Governors General: The Lord Stanley of Preston; The Earl of Aberdeen
- Premier: Thomas Greenway
- Preceded by: James Cox Aikins
- Succeeded by: James Colebrooke Patterson

Canadian Senator from Manitoba
- In office September 23, 1882 – July 1, 1888
- Nominated by: John A. Macdonald
- Appointed by: Royal Proclamation

Member of Parliament for Lisgar
- In office March 2, 1871 – June 20, 1882
- Preceded by: Established
- Succeeded by: Arthur Wellington Ross

Personal details
- Born: January 1, 1840 Amherstburg Canada West
- Died: April 13, 1896 (aged 56) Monterrey, Nuevo León, Mexico
- Party: Liberal-Conservative

Sir John Christian Schultz KCMG (January 1, 1840 – April 13, 1896) was a Manitoba politician and businessman. He was a member of the House of Commons of Canada from 1871 to 1882, a Senator from 1882 to 1888, and the fifth Lieutenant Governor of Manitoba from 1888 to 1895.

== Early life ==
Schultz was born in Amherstburg, Canada West (now Ontario). Despite being raised in a poor household, he saved enough money to study medicine at Queen's College in Kingston (1858–60) and Victoria College in Cobourg (1860–61). He did not graduate from either institution, but nonetheless advertised himself as a "Physician and Surgeon" after moving to the Red River settlement later in 1861 (it is unknown if he purchased a degree, as was legal at the time). He also worked as a businessman and speculator in this area, and eventually owned a number of stores in the Red River colony's business sector, including the general store which was the initial building at Portage and Main with his half-brother Henry McKenney.

Schultz also helped to establish a museum and Masonic Lodge in 1864 in the region. Arrested for improper business practices in 1868, his wife and supporters soon broke into the prison and released him. He continued to live and work in the area, in open defiance of the Council of Assiniboia.

== Newspaper career ==
In 1859, Schultz convinced Patrick Gammie Laurie, a newspaper publisher in Canada West, to sell his Owen Sound Times to set up the first newspaper in the Red River settlement; Laurie abandoned the idea before arriving when he found out that William Buckingham and William Coldwell had established one already: the Nor'Wester. James Ross bought Buckingham's share of the Nor'Wester in 1863 and sold it to Schultz in 1864; Schultz became full owner when he purchased Coldwell's the following year.

Schultz was a major figure in the early, highly partisan publishing world of the Red River area, which was soon to become the province of Manitoba. Schultz used the Nor'Wester to promote ending the Hudson's Bay Company's rule of the Red River area and open it to settlement. Following his arrest and jailbreak in 1868, the paper ran a version of his side of the story and a criticism of the Hudson's Bay Company's legal authority. He sold the Nor'Wester to Walter R. Brown in 1868, and Louis Riel confiscated it the following year.

== Red River Resistance ==
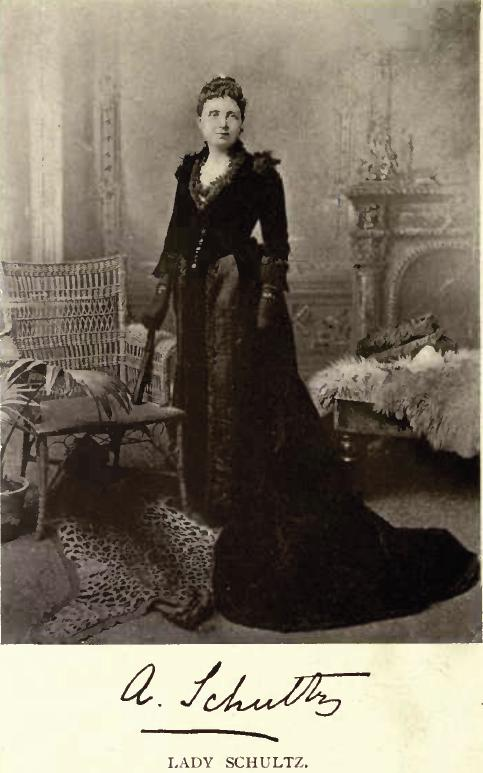
Schultz married Agnes Campbell Farquharson in 1867.

Schultz was initially on good terms with Red River's francophone community, but his unscrupulous business practices soon made him unpopular with most established settlers, anglophone and francophone alike. By 1869, he had emerged as the leader of a small, ultra-loyalist organization known as the Canadian Party. This group promoted the annexation of Red River by the Canadian government, and encouraged new anglophone/Protestant immigration from Ontario. Schultz and his followers were actively engaged in land speculation, and were viewed with extreme suspicion by most of Red River's Métis community.

During the Red River Resistance of 1869–70, Schultz emerged as one of the leading opponents of Louis Riel's provisional government (which was supported by most of the area's population). Schultz's followers engaged in a number of military skirmishes with the Riel government. Schultz and a number of his followers were taken prisoner by Riel. Schultz managed to escape, and tried to organize a group to liberate the remaining prisoners, but was forced to leave the region in February 1870. He arrived in Toronto in April.

Schultz made several speeches against the Riel government during his time in Toronto, and played a significant role in swaying Protestant opinion against the Métis leader. He frequently referred to Thomas Scott (an Ontario Orangeman executed by the Riel government for "treason") as a Protestant hero, and called upon Ontario's Orangemen to avenge his death (both Schultz and Macdonald were also Orangemen, as were most of the Ontario militiamen).

Schultz returned to Red River (now renamed Manitoba) in September, after the Canadian government had taken the area with militia units from Ontario. These Ontario soldiers frequently engaged in violence against the Métis population; there can be little doubt that Schultz approved of and encouraged their actions.

== Political career ==
=== Provincial politics ===
The newly established government of Manitoba sought conciliation among the province's ethnic, religious and linguistic factions, and generally regarded Schultz as a disruptive force. Lieutenant Governor Adams George Archibald hated Schultz, and refused to consider him when constructing his first administration. In Manitoba's first provincial election (December 30, 1870), Schultz's Canadian Party was the only real opposition to the governing alliance. His followers won four seats (one of which was overturned on appeal), and were responsible for the death of at least one aboriginal government supporter. Schultz himself was defeated by Hudson's Bay Company spokesman Donald Smith in the riding of Winnipeg and St. John, 70 votes to 63. There was a riot among the Ontario militiamen when the result was announced.

The Canadian Party continued as a parliamentary force after this defeat. At one stage, Archibald warned Prime Minister John A. Macdonald that they were promoting the "extermination" of the Métis.

=== Federal politics ===
Manitoba elected its first representatives to the federal House of Commons in March 1871, and Schultz declared himself a candidate in the riding of Lisgar. He was "a member of the expansionist Canada First movement." In a campaign marked by violence and intimidation, he defeated local government supporter Colin Inkster by 315 votes to 65.

Schultz's political affiliations were ambiguous in this period. John A. Macdonald attempted to bring him into the Conservative ranks in 1871, almost certainly with the intent of neutralizing him. These efforts were unsuccessful, and by 1872 Schultz was apparently calling himself an Independent Liberal. He started another local paper, the Manitoba Liberal, before the year was over.

In the federal election of 1872, Schultz defeated his former ally Edward Hay, 273 votes to 128. He defeated Hay a second time in 1874, 285 votes to 216. He was also appointed to the Council of the Northwest Territories in 1872, and served on that board until its restructuring in 1876.

Notwithstanding Schultz's past agitations against the Métis, he was actually a defender of aboriginal rights for most of his time in parliament. He sought better compensation for the aboriginal population covered under Treaty 3, and tried to protect the buffalo from being hunted to extinction. He also sought to provide the west's Métis population with sufficient provisions for farming.

These positions may appear strikingly out of character of Schultz's previous actions, but they can probably be explained by the reduced influence of Louis Riel in the Canadian west after 1875. Most English-speaking aboriginals in the region were opposed to Riel, as were a number of francophone Métis; these groups generally did not consider Schultz as an enemy, nor was he unfavourably disposed toward them. Schultz continued to be a leading opponent of Riel in the 1870s, supporting his expulsion from parliament in 1874 and his five-year banishment from Canada in 1875. (It may also be noted that Schultz stood to benefit financially from some of the policies which he advocated for western Canada's native population.)

Schultz was re-elected by acclamation in the federal election of 1878, as John A. Macdonald's Conservatives won a national victory. Schultz would thereafter identify himself as a Liberal-Conservative and a supporter of Macdonald. Manitoba's population was by this time becoming dominated by Ontario immigrants (Riel's followers having largely abandoned the area), and Schultz was no longer considered a dangerous outsider by the local power structure.

In 1882, Schultz was defeated by Arthur Wellington Ross (also a Conservative), 760 votes to 720. Schultz was in poor health by this time, and many believed that he had little time left to live. Perhaps out of sympathy, John A. Macdonald appointed him to the Senate on September 23, 1882.

Schultz's health subsequently recovered, and he was able to function as an active member of the Senate. He supported prohibition, and continued to defend aboriginal rights against outside incursions.

=== Lieutenant-Governor ===
On July 1, 1888, he resigned his Senate seat to become the Lieutenant-Governor of Manitoba. He was instructed to keep the Macdonald government updated on developments in the province, and to attempt to influence the government of Thomas Greenway on matters involving Macdonald's National Policy. He played little part in the Greenway government's anti-bilingualism legislation (which resulted in the Manitoba Schools Question), though he dutifully signed it into law on March 1, 1890, following Macdonald's orders. Schultz subsequently sought concessions for francophone schools.

== Late life and legacy ==
Schultz stepped down as Lt. Governor in 1895. He traveled to Mexico in an attempt to improve his faltering health, but died there in 1896. Schultz's remains were transported to Winnipeg by a special baggage car, draped in a black cloth on the Great Northern Railway. His remains were accompanied by his best friend Alfred Codd and his wife.

Schultz's progress from political outsider to Lt. Governor reflects the changes which occurred in Manitoba from 1870 to 1888. Although his early demagoguery was moderated over time, it is unlikely that he could have assumed high office had it not been for the high movement of anglophone settlers from Ontario to Manitoba in the intervening years. In 1870, he was regarded as a nuisance; he was loathed throughout his life as noted upon his death by many influential people who had the displeasure of making his acquaintance.

Outside politics Schultz, Henry Septimus Beddome, Curtis James Bird and others were the founders of the Medical Health Board of Manitoba which was incorporated in 1871 and became the College of Physicians and Surgeons of Manitoba in 1877. Schultz was actively interested in railway and telegraph development and in colonization.

== Electoral record ==
1874 Canadian federal election: Lisgar
Party	Candidate	Votes
Conservative	John Christian Schultz	285
Unknown	Edward Hay	216
lop.parl.ca

1878 Canadian federal election: Lisgar
Party	Candidate	Votes
Conservative	John Christian Schultz	acclaimed

1882 Canadian federal election: Lisgar
Party	Candidate	Votes
Liberal–Conservative	Arthur Wellington Ross	760
Unknown	John Christian Schultz	720
