= Provincial secretary =

The provincial secretary was a senior position in the executive councils of British North America's colonial governments, and was retained by the Canadian provincial governments for at least a century after Canadian Confederation was proclaimed in 1867. The position has been abolished in almost all provinces in recent decades (Quebec in 1970, Ontario 1985, most recently by British Columbia in 2000); the exceptions are Saskatchewan and Nova Scotia, where it still exists but is no longer a standalone senior portfolio (in Nova Scotia it is held by Minister of Justice and Attorney General of Nova Scotia since 1993, but co-held with Government Services and Consumer Affairs from 1980 to 1993; held by the Premier 1848 to 1878 and Provincial Treasurer 1878 to 1946).

== History ==
The position existed prior to Confederation in the Province of Canada (as well as in the previous provinces of Upper Canada and Lower Canada) and the various governments in Atlantic Canada under British rule, though in Newfoundland and Prince Edward Island the title was colonial secretary. British Columbia also had a colonial secretary prior to becoming a province of Canada in 1871. Before the granting of responsible government and the emergence of the position of premier, the provincial secretary was the leading position in the executive councils appointed by the various governors and lieutenant-governors of British North America. Frequently, provincial secretaries during these periods were the most powerful elected representatives in their jurisdictions.

The provincial secretary was the equivalent of the former Canadian Cabinet position of Secretary of State for Canada. Like its federal counterpart it included an eclectic variety of responsibilities that were not assigned to other ministers, most of which would eventually evolve into portfolios of their own. In Nova Scotia, where the position originated in 1720, the provincial secretary was also the treasurer of the province until 1946. The provincial secretary was also responsible for official communications between the provincial government and the Colonial Office in London as well as with other provincial and colonial governments (and after 1867 the federal government). As well, the position also included various duties related to ceremonial occasions, visits by dignitaries, protocol, relations between the government and the office of lieutenant-governor and commemorative events particularly in relation to the monarchy.

Generally, the provincial secretary acted as a province's registrar-general and was responsible for formal documents and records such as licences, birth and death certificates, land registries and surveys, business registrations and writs. As well, the position was generally responsible for the administration of the civil service and of elections. Provincial secretaries were usually the most senior member of the provincial cabinet outside of the premier, and the office holder was often designated as acting premier when the premier was out of province, ill or otherwise unavailable.

The position of provincial secretary was particularly important in Manitoba from 1870 to 1874, as that province's institutions were being established. The province had no premier during this period, and its lieutenant-governors acted as the de facto leaders of government. The early provincial secretaries (including Alfred Boyd and Henry Joseph Clarke) were the most prominent elected officials in the province, and are retroactively regarded as premiers in many modern sources.

The provincial secretary continued to oversee miscellaneous government activities into the twentieth-century (Nova Scotia's Public Service Act conferred on the position responsibility for all matters not specifically assigned to any other minister). Frequently, twentieth-century provincial secretaries would concurrently hold other cabinet portfolios.

== Non-governmental ==
In many organizations in Canada the provincial secretary is also the name of a senior officer at the provincial level. The Monarchist League of Canada, for instance, has provincial secretaries in various parts of the country who are primarily responsible for the organizing the league's activities in a specific province.

In the provincial sections of the New Democratic Party, the provincial secretary is the senior administrative officer, and may be by title or function chief executive officer, of the non-parliamentary wing of the party and is responsible for organizing provincial conventions, provincial councils and other meetings, membership drives, fundraising and other day-to-day operations. As well, the provincial secretary usually has a senior role in administering the party's electoral campaigns.

== See also ==
- Chief Secretary
- Provincial Secretary and Registrar of Ontario
- Secretary of State for Canada
- Deputy premier
- Secrétariat provincial du Québec
