= Premier of Manitoba =

Head of government of Manitoba

- Premier ministre du Manitoba
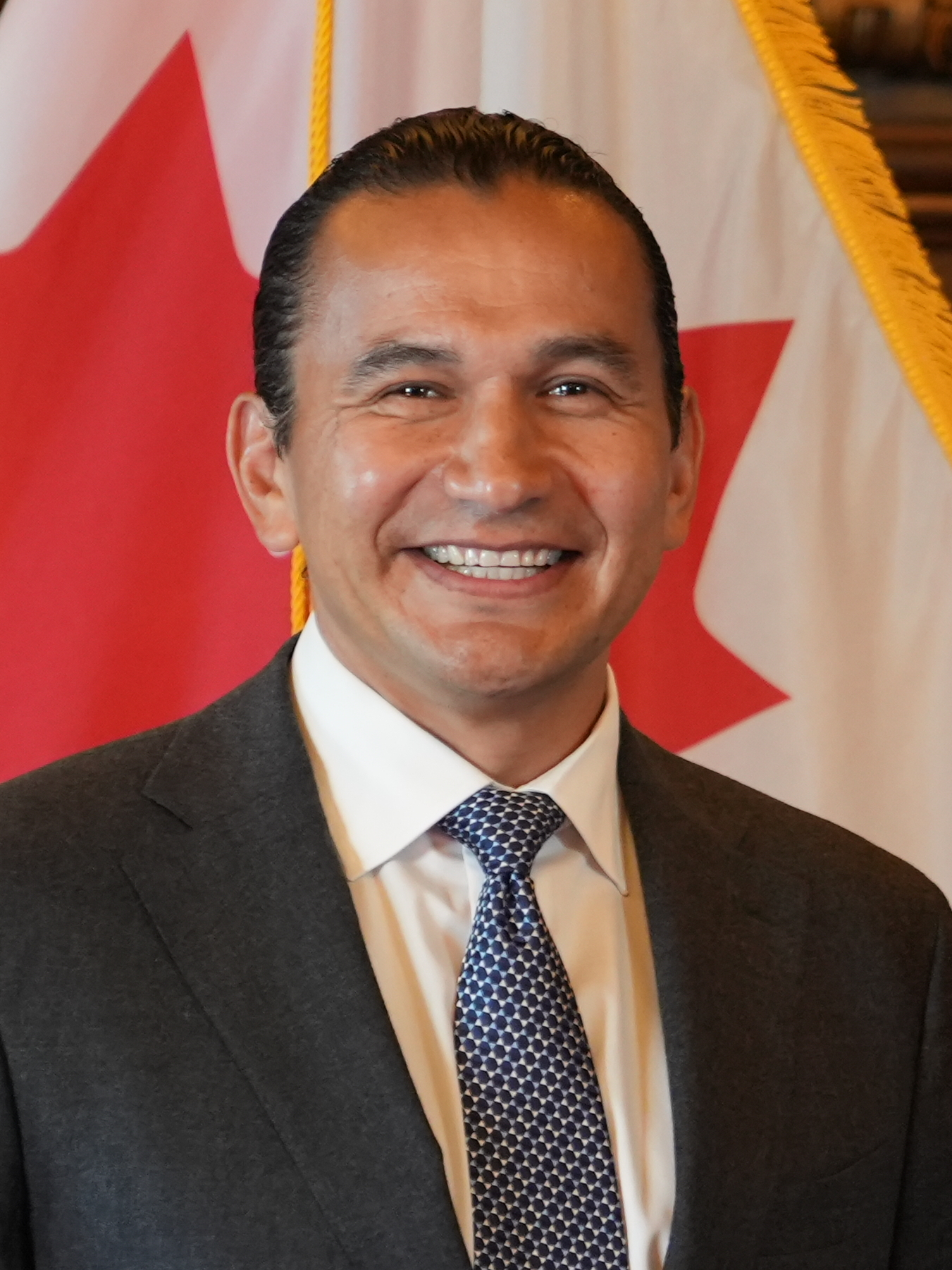
- Incumbent; Wab Kinew since October 18, 2023
- Office of the Premier
- Style: The Honourable (formal); Premier (informal)
- Status: Head of Government
- Member of: Legislative Assembly; Executive Council
- Reports to: Legislative Assembly; Lieutenant Governor
- Seat: Manitoba Legislative Building; 450 Broadway, Winnipeg, MB
- Appointer: Lieutenant Governor of Manitoba; with the confidence of the Manitoba Legislature
- Term length: At His Majesty's pleasure; contingent on the premier's ability to command confidence in the legislative assembly
- Formation: September 16, 1870
- First holder: Alfred Boyd
- Deputy: Deputy Premier of Manitoba
- Salary: In 2025, $109,268 (MLA Basic Annual Salary) plus $91,566 (Premier Additional Annual Salary). Additional MLA Allowances include Living Allowance, Travel Allowance, Office Rent Allowance, Assistants Allowance, Constituency Allowance (between $68,140 and $76,333), and others.
- Website: Premier official website

The premier of Manitoba (French: premier ministre du Manitoba) is the first minister and head of government for the Canadian province of Manitoba—as well as the de facto President of the province's Executive Council.

In formal terms, the premier receives a commission to form a government from the Lieutenant Governor of Manitoba, who represents the monarch at the provincial level.

The 25th and current premier of Manitoba is Wab Kinew, who was sworn in on October 18, 2023.

== Status and role ==
The premier of Manitoba is the head of the government, in that they are the head of the provincial party capable of winning a vote of confidence in the Legislative Assembly of Manitoba. In this sense, the role of the premier is the same as the prime minister, but at the provincial level.

After being sworn in, the premier organises a provincial cabinet (the Executive Council), which is formally appointed by the lieutenant governor (LG). Together, the premier and lieutenant governor are comparable to U.S. state governors: the lieutenant governor performs functions of state and protocol, such as signing bills into law, as the King's representative to the province; while the premier is responsible for overseeing the operations of government as head of the cabinet.

The premier also represents the province on a national level, and has talks with other premiers and the Prime Minister once a year.

== Premiers of Manitoba ==
=== History ===
The Province of Manitoba was created on 12 May 1870 with the passing of the Manitoba Act. The next month, on July 15, the Province was officially admitted into Confederation. On December 30 that year, the first election was held for the Manitoba's Legislative Assembly.

From 1870 to 1874, Manitoba was governed by its first two Lieutenant Governors (LG), Adams Archibald and Alexander Morris. As agents of the LGs, Alfred Boyd (1870–71) and Henry Joseph Clarke (1872–74), who are often named in various lists as the first Manitoba premiers, never actually held the title of "Premier." Accordingly, there has been debate as to whether the Office of Premier can be considered to have existed before Marc-Amable Girard's premiership that began in July 1874. Lieutenant Governor Morris recognized Girard as such in the following correspondence to the Secretary of State in Ottawa:

Sir,

I have the honor to inform you, that the Legislative Assembly having adopted a vote of want of confidence in the Ministry of Manitoba by a vote of 15 to 7, I accepted the resignations which the ministers tendered me and having called upon the Hon'ble Mr. Gerard [sic] to form a new administration, that gentleman succeeded in the task entrusted to him ...

I would call your attention to the fact that in forming the Government I did so through the intervention of a premier thus introducing responsible Government in its modern type into the Province - the previous Ministry was selected personally by my predecessor and none of its members were recognized as first minister.

— Lieutenant-Governor Alexander Morris (13 July 1874)

Additionally, Wab Kinew, Leader of Manitoba's New Democratic Party (NDP), introduced a bill in 2020 to formally recognize the founder of Manitoba, Louis Riel, as the province's first premier. While this private member's bill (bill 206 of the 42nd legislature) was defeated, Wab later passed the bill in 2023 when he became Premier (bill 2 of the 43rd legislature).

Until 1888, the administrations of Manitoba were non-partisan. That year, Thomas Greenway would become the first partisan and first Liberal premier of Manitoba, followed by Conservative Hugh John Macdonald. Progressivism would finally make its way to Manitoba's government in 1922, under the non-partisan United Farmers leader John Bracken, who held office for 20 years under various political and non-partisan labels.

Since the 1950s, Manitoba has alternated between governments led by the New Democrats (and predecessors) and by the Progressive Conservatives (PC; and predecessors). Moreover, throughout the province's history, all but one of its governments—Premier Sterling Lyon (1977–81)—have been elected to second terms.

In 2016, long-time conservative politician Brian Pallister became the 22nd premier of Manitoba, upending 17 years of NDP governance in the province. Pallister's landslide victory would follow the premiership of NDP Greg Selinger (2009–16), who Maclean's says has been regarded as Canada's "least popular premier." Following his election, according to the Angus Reid Institute, Pallister was the 2nd-most-popular premier in the country; however, his popularity would steadily decline since (with an approval rating of 37% two years into his mandate).

== See also ==
=== Politics in Manitoba ===
Leaders

- List of premiers of Manitoba
  - List of premiers of Manitoba by time in office
- Deputy premier of Manitoba
- List of lieutenant governors of Manitoba
- List of mayors of Brandon
- List of mayors of Winnipeg
- Governors of the Red River Settlement (1812–70)

Legislature

- Manitoba Legislature
- Legislative Assembly of Manitoba
  - Speaker of the Legislative Assembly of Manitoba
  - Leader of the Opposition of Manitoba
- Monarchy in Manitoba
  - Lieutenant governor of Manitoba
- Legislative Council of Manitoba (1871–76)

Other

- Manitoba Senators
- Chief Justice of Manitoba

=== Politics in Canada ===
- Politics of Canada
- Prime Minister of Canada
- Premier (Canada)
