= Joseph Royal =

Canadian politician

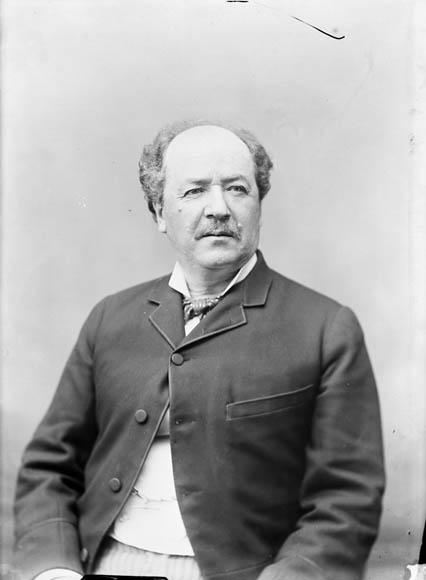

5th Lieutenant Governor of the North-West Territories
- In office 1 July 1888 – 31 October 1893
- Monarch: Victoria
- Governors General: The Lord Stanley of Preston; The Earl of Aberdeen
- Preceded by: Edgar Dewdney
- Succeeded by: Charles Herbert Mackintosh

Member of the Canadian Parliament for Provencher
- In office 30 December 1879 – 1 July 1888
- Preceded by: Joseph Dubuc
- Succeeded by: Alphonse Alfred Clément Larivière

1st Speaker of the Legislative Assembly of Manitoba
- In office 15 March 1871 – 21 February 1872
- Preceded by: Position established
- Succeeded by: Curtis James Bird

Member of the Legislative Assembly of Manitoba for St. Francis Xavier West
- In office 27 December 1870 – 16 December 1879
- Preceded by: Constituency established
- Succeeded by: district abolished

Personal details
- Born: 7 May 1837 Repentigny, Lower Canada
- Died: 23 August 1902 (aged 65) Montreal, Quebec
- Party: Conservative
- Spouse: Agnès Bruyère (m. 1857)
- Children: 8
- Occupation: Journalist, lawyer, businessman
- Profession: Politician
- Cabinet: Provincial: Minister of Public Works; Attorney General; Provincial Secretary

Joseph Royal (7 May 1837 – 23 August 1902) was a Canadian journalist, lawyer, politician, businessman, and Lieutenant Governor of the Northwest Territories.

== Early life and career ==
Royal studied at St. Mary's Jesuit college in Montreal. His early publishing career included a term as editor of Montreal's Minerve from 1857 to 1859. He then founded and published other Montreal-based publications such as L'Ordre (1859–1860), La Revue Canadienne (1864) and Le Nouveau Monde (1867, editor-in-chief). Soon after moving to Manitoba, Royal founded Le Metis and operated that publication from 1871 to 1882 after which its new owner changed its title to Le Manitoba.

His legal career began in Lower Canada where he was called to that province's bar in 1864. He joined the Manitoba bar in 1871 after moving to that province. In 1880, Royal left legal practice.

== Political career ==
In the 1870 Manitoba provincial elections, he was acclaimed to the Legislative Assembly of Manitoba for the riding St François Xavier West, and in 1871 he was unanimously chosen speaker. From 1874 to 1876, he was the Provincial Secretary and Minister of Public Works. From 1876 to 1878, he was the Attorney General. In 1878, he was the Minister of Public Works.

In an 1879 by-election, he was elected to the House of Commons of Canada representing the Manitoba riding of Provencher. A Conservative, he was re-elected in 1882 and 1887.

Royal was appointed to, and served as a member on the Temporary North-West Council, the first legislature of the Northwest Territories from 1872 to 1876. He would later serve as the Lieutenant Governor of the Northwest Territories from 1888 to 1893.

== Later life ==
In December 1894, Royal returned to La Minerve where he became editor-in-chief. After publishing other books, he died in Montreal in 1902.

== Works ==
- Vie Politique de Sir Louis H Lafontaine (1864)
- La Vallée de la Mantawa (Montreal, 1869)
- Le Canada, république ou colonie? (Montreal, 1894)
- Histoire du Canada 1841 à 1867 (Montreal, 1909) – published after death

== Electoral history ==
1887 Canadian federal election: Provencher
Party	Candidate	Votes	%
Conservative	Joseph Royal	1,081	58.1
Independent Liberal	Joseph Ernest Cyr	778	41.9
Total valid votes		1,859	100.0

1882 Canadian federal election: Provencher
Party	Candidate	Votes
Conservative	Joseph Royal	acclaimed

Canadian federal by-election, 30 December 1879
Party	Candidate	Votes	%
Conservative	Joseph Royal	652	62.6
Unknown	John Molloy	269	25.8
Unknown	S. Hamelin	121	11.6
Total valid votes		1,042	100.0
Called upon Mr. Dubuc being appointed Puisne Judge of the Court of Queen's Bench for Manitoba.
