= Legislative Assembly of Assiniboia =

Former legislature of Manitoba

The Legislative Assembly of Assiniboia (French: Assemblée législative d'Assiniboine) was a short-lived legislature established to pass laws for the North-Western Territory and Rupert's Land under the provisional government led by Louis Riel from 1869 to 1870. The Legislative Assembly was named after the Council of Assiniboia that previously managed the territories before the Hudson's Bay Company sold the land to Canada in 1869.

The guidelines for the creation of the elected assembly had been established during the Convention of Forty in January and February 1870 and elections followed shortly afterwards. The number of representatives of constituencies considered to be English-speaking and those considered to be French-speaking were made equal. The assembly operated from March 9, 1870, to June 24, 1870. Its final act was to accept the agreement negotiated with Canada for the new province of Manitoba to enter Confederation and to ratify the Manitoba Act.

== Executive officers of the provisional government ==
Position	Officer	First Sworn in	No. of terms
President	Louis Riel	1869	1st term
Vice-president	François-Xavier Dauphinais	1869	1st term
Secretary of State	Thomas Bunn	1869	1st term
Under-secretary of State	Louis Schmidt	1869	1st term
Treasurer	William Bernard O'Donoghue	1869	1st term
Chief Justice	James Ross	1869	1st term
Adjutant General	Ambroise-Dydime Lépine	1869	1st term
Postmaster-General	A.G.B. Bannatyne	1869	1st term
Coroner	C.J. Bird	1869	1st term
Commissioner of Indian Affairs	James McKay	1869	1st term
Superintendent of Public Works	John Bruce	1869	1st term

== Legislative Council ==
Member	District	First elected	No. of terms
Pierre Poitras	Baie Saint-Paul	1869	1st term
William Auld Tait	Headingley	1869	1st term
William Fraser	Kildonan	1869	1st term
Pierre Delorme	Pointe Coupée	1869	1st term
Louis Schmidt	Pointe Coupée	1869	1st term
E.H.G.G. Hay	St. Andrew's	1869	1st term
Thomas Sinclair Jr.	St. Andrew's	1869	1st term
George Gunn	Sainte-Anne	1869	1st term
A.G.B. Bannatyne	St. Anne's	1869	1st term
John Bruce	Saint-Boniface	1869	1st term
William Bernard O'Donoghue	Saint-Boniface	1869	1st term
Louis Lacerte	Saint-Boniface	1869	1st term
Jean-Baptiste Beauchemin	Saint-Charles	1869	1st term
François Dauphinais	Saint-Charles	1869	1st term
Thomas Bunn	St. Clement's	1869	1st term
François-Xavier Pagé	Saint-François-Xavier	1869	1st term
James McKay	St. James's	1869	1st term
A.G.B. Bannatyne	St. John's	1869	1st term
John Lazarus Norquay	St. Margaret's	1869	1st term
William Garrioch Jr.	St. Mary's Laprairie	1869	1st term
Pierre Parenteau	Saint-Norbert	1869	1st term
Baptiste Tourond	Saint-Norbert	1869	1st term
C.J. Bird	St. Paul	1869	1st term
John Sinclair	St. Peter's	1869	1st term
André Beauchemin	Saint-Vital	1869	1st term
Ambroise-Dydime Lépine	Saint-Vital	1869	1st term
Hugh F. O'Lone	Town of Winnipeg	1869	1st term
Alfred H. Scott	Town of Winnipeg	1869	1st term
