= Beauchemin (surname) =

Beauchemin is a French surname. Notable people with the name include:

- André Beauchemin (1824–1902), Canadian politician in Manitoba
- François Beauchemin (born 1980), Canadian ice hockey defenceman
- Georges Beauchemin (1891–1957), Canadian singer and veterinarian
- Jean-Baptiste Beauchemin (1838–1900), Canadian political figure in Manitoba
- Karen Beauchemin Canadian scientist and ruminant nutritionist
- Micheline Beauchemin (1929–2009), Canadian textile artist and weaver
- Nérée Beauchemin (1850–1931), French Canadian poet and physician
- Yves Beauchemin (born 1941), Quebec novelist

== See also ==
- Marie-Ève Beauchemin-Nadeau (born 1988), Canadian weightlifter
- Catherine Beauchemin-Pinard (born 1994), Canadian judoka
- Tina Cardinale-Beauchemin (born 1966), American ice hockey player
- Charles-Odilon Beauchemin (1822–1887) Canadian printer and bookseller
- Beauchemin, commune in the Haute-Marne département of north-eastern France
