= Parenteau =

Parenteau may refer to:

- Donny Parenteau (fl. 1991– ), singer-songwriter, multi-instrumentalist and record producer
- Marc Parenteau (born 1980), professional Canadian football offensive lineman
- P. A. Parenteau (born 1983), Canadian professional ice hockey right winger
- Pierre Parenteau (c. 1814 – after 1886), Canadian politician
- Jean-Pierre Paranteau (1944–2024), French cyclist.

== See also ==
- Barentu (disambiguation)
- Parentia
