= Frederick William Burns =

American sports announcer

Fred Burns
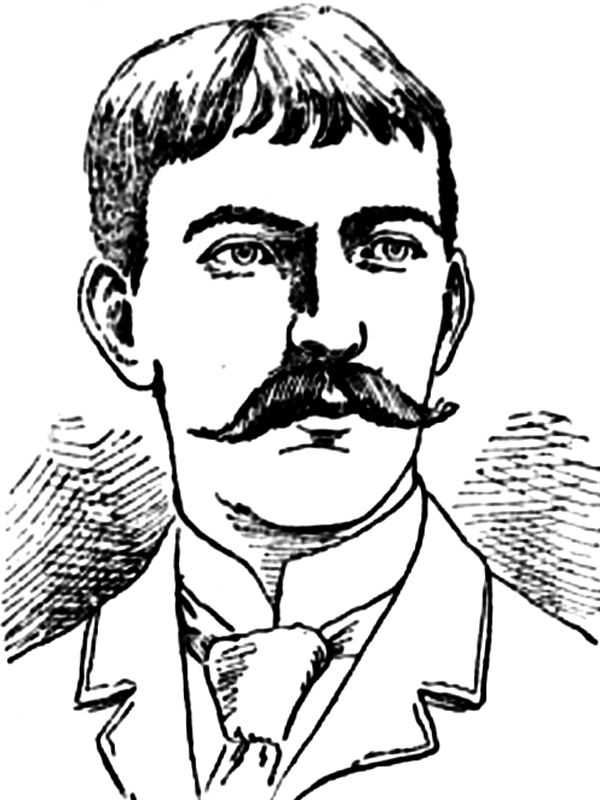
- Fred Burns, 1891
- Born: Frederick William Burns; July 7, 1860; Brooklyn, Kings County, New York, U.S.
- Died: June 21, 1923 (aged 62); Richmond, New York, U.S.
- Other name: "Silver-Tongue Fred"
- Occupation: public address announcer
- Years active: 1884-1904

Frederick William Burns (July 7, 1860 – June 21, 1923) was an American professional sports announcer. He is the earliest known sports announcer credited with creating the profession at the Staten Island Athletic Club games in 1884.

== Early years ==
Burns was born in Brooklyn on July 7, 1860 to Scottish immigrants. His father, Archimedes Burns, was a Scotsman who immigrated from Ireland. Both he and his brother, Euclid Garfield Burns, were born in Ireland at 10 Dobbin Street in Armagh. Archimedes and Euclid traveled through India and Africa prior to entering the United States about 1856. Archimedes and his brother began a plumbing business in Brooklyn which they managed together until Archimedes's sudden death prior to 1860 leaving Fred without a father prior to the age of 9.

His mother, Agnes Alderdice Wemyss-Burns (née MacIlvine), came to the United States in 1842 at the age of 12. Prior to Archimedes's death, Archimedes and Agnes had four children: Matilda Frank, Fred, Ulala Evangeline and Lualaba Gwendoline. Matilda died at just over two years old August 11, 1860, when Fred was only a month old. Agnes, always a homemaker, lived on Clinton Street in Brooklyn and owned a summer home in Echo Lake, New Jersey. She lived to the surprising age of 92 when most died in their sixties. She was mentally sharp to the end.

Burns's early work had him involved with his uncle and well-known local Brooklyn politician, Euclid G. Burns. His business entanglements with his uncle found him in front of a magistrate more than once including charges of violating his liquor license for selling alcohol on Sunday. Ultimately, he landed in his lifelong daytime profession as a broker at the Custom House on Wall Street until his death in 1923.

== Athletics ==
Both his parents were notably bigger people so, Burns, of no surprise, was slender and tall for the time at six feet. He grew up involved in athletics, participating in decathlon-style sports as well as two fledgling sports which had become American rages: baseball and football. Burns, despite his rheumatism, competed in track and field events into the 1890s. Burns was a noted oarsmen and a good fisherman as well. Burns and his wife Anna were championship winning bowlers in the New York City area. Anna, particularly, set bowling records for women, rolling over 200 on many an occasion. Taught by his father, Burns played golf all his life, competing regularly in amateur tournaments after his announcing years faded. He became involved in local golf course design and tournament scoring rules during the years prior to his death.

== Lacrosse ==
In the early 1870s at a lacrosse exhibition on the Capitoline Grounds, Burns became very impressed with lacrosse. He could not afford his own lacrosse stick so, he taught himself to thrown and catch with a broom. About 10 years later, Burns was training for sprinting at the original Polo Grounds. Burns's running came to the attention of John R. Flannery (Father of Modern Lacrosse). Flannery, who captained the New York Lacrosse Club, approached Burns because he was lacking fast runners on the team. Burns spoke of the broom story and a friendship blossomed which would last until Flannery's death in 1919. Burns played lacrosse on Flannery's New York Lacrosse Club and Williamsburgh Athletic Club teams for 8 years until rheumatism got the better of him.

During that time Burns played primarily Inside Home (Attack in modern terminology). Together, they won numerous local and national championships including the Hermann Oelrichs Cup (local) and the James Gordon Bennett, Jr. Cup (national). Bennett, publisher of the New York Herald was better known for his namesake yachting cup. Both he and Flannery were selected to the All-American team to go to England but, neither could make the trip due to their respective business affairs. However, the managers of the All-American team chose a warm-up team, which included Burns and Flannery, to play the All-America team prior to their departure. Burns's and Flannery's team won, much to the chagrin of the All-America squad, handily. The All-America team, without Burns and Flannery, traveled to England and overwhelmingly won every match. They were noted by their England opponents for their rough play. The Williamsburgh N.Y.A.C. lacrosse team, with Flannery and Burns, went on to tie the Canadian champion Caughnewaga Indians 3–3, which was shocking because at the time, what baseball meant to the United States, lacrosse meant to Canada. Both Burns and Flannery scored in the contest. No American clubs came close to the Canadian teams until that July afternoon in 1884.

Burns proclaimed the forward pass in football had its origins in lacrosse, much to the denouncing of Yale stars, quarterback Harry Beecher and fullback Billy Bull, who attributed it to the great Walter Camp. Contrary to modern belief, the forward pass got its start long before the 1896 contest between John Heisman's North Carolina Football Team and Pop Warner's Georgia Bulldogs.

== Cycling and the Good Roads Association ==
Burns's enthusiasm for cycling began in the early 1890s. During this time, he became part of the Good Roads Associations of Brooklyn and Long Island and served on executive committees which led to the first paved bicycle path between Brooklyn and Coney Island. He was the chairman of the Track and Race Committee of the New York Division of the League of American Wheelmen which constructed the concrete-paved Manhattan Beach Bicycle Racetrack in 1895 which included banked turns. Over 12,000 wheelmen attended the first meet in June with numerous American and world cycling records broken. The success led to many professional and amateur races at the venue including the establishment of a bicycle-riding academy for women, children and beginners. He was even considered as a candidate for President of the L.A.W. in 1898 due to his honesty and ability.

Of all the athletic clubs he belonged to and as avid a cyclist as he was, he never belonged to a wheelmen's club and became known as the "Hermit Wheelman" for simply riding off on his own. There are numerous accounts of him riding his bicycle to events of which he announced. In a couple of cases having been engaged as the ring announcer of illegal boxing bouts, he attained a reputation for escaping arrest by the police by outrunning them on his bicycle.

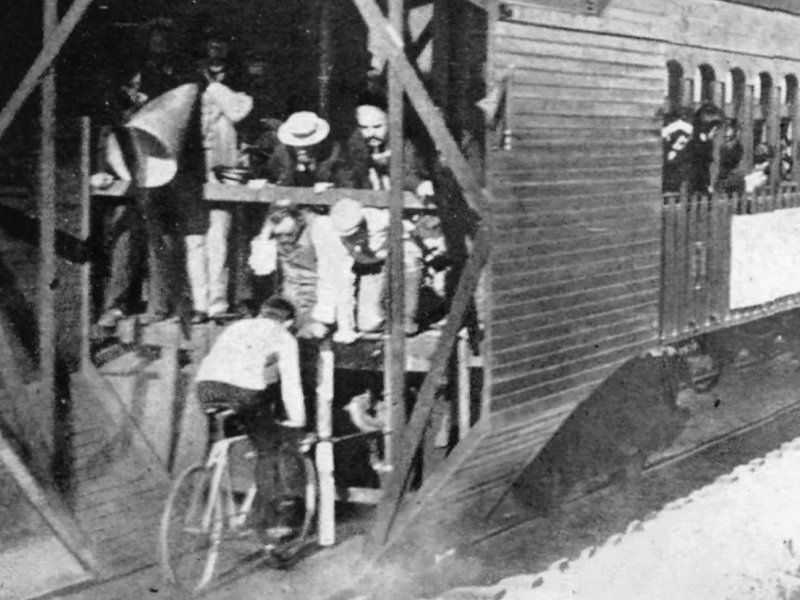
Fred Burns announcing for Charles "Mile-A-Minute" Murphy in 1899

Burns staunchly supported Mile-A-Minute Murphy in his quest to show a cyclist could pedal 1 mile in less than 1 minute. It started with Charles Murphy's declaration that he would perform the feat by June 1, 1895. Burns's first involvement came in May as he'd written a letter to the Pennsylvania Railroad to allow Murphy to follow behind a train moving at 60 miles per hour. Numerous railroads all over the country were contacted to perform the feat. Finally, the Long Island Railroad finally agreed in 1899. On June 1, 1899, after over four years of effort and all Burns's and Murphy's letters to railroads, Murphy rode a mile behind a Long Island Railroad train in 57.8 seconds.

== Announcing ==
In the earliest days of athletic competitions, results were recorded and posted on bulletin boards whereby spectators and athletes crowded around them to view the official results. The earliest account of announcing came at the spring athletic games of the Staten Island Athletic Club on Saturday, May 17, 1884, on their grounds in West Brighton. The tale of announcing began as a bit of joke. A number of events were tight and spectators crowded around the boards to get the results. Folk who could not see the board clamored after the results of various athletes. Burns, known for his sharp piercing voice, stepped up and began reading off the answers to the crowd. Burns received a huge ovation for his efforts and announcing was born.

A separate account had Burns, sidelined from an athletic event with rheumatism in the winter of 1886, shouting loudly during the games. His close friend Malcolm W. Ford, the Jim Thorpe of his time, recommended to him to try announcing events. However, Burns had already been announcing by this time. Regardless, Burns and Malcolm were very close friends until that latter's 1902 murder-suicide of his novelist brother, Paul Ford. Malcolm loved Burns's little girls, Florence and Gladyss, and was seen on more than one occasion holding their hands at athletic clubs and venues where both Burns and Ford trained, officiated and competed.

From these early beginnings, "F. W. Burns" could be read in all the New York papers multiple times per week in relation to athletic contests and boxing matches, sporting a moniker brand new to the sporting world, Announcer. The more notable athletic clubs in the northeast, such as the New York Athletic Club, created roles for an official announcer. Although Burns remained the preference of most all athletic organizations in the northeast, he could not cover all events and other names began to appear. Burns was the first announcer of record in Madison Square Garden I in 1889 and in Madison Square Garden II in 1890. Current events are held in Madison Square Garden IV.

By the 1890s, all notable boxing matches employed Burns as the ring announcer. He announced some of the biggest names in boxing including Godfrey, Choynski and so many more. When George Dixon defeated England's Fred Johnson in 1892 to become the first ever African-American boxing champion at any weight, Burns was the announcer. When Jim Jeffries beat Bob Fitzsimmons in 1899 for his first Heavyweight Championship, both pugilists got announced by Burns. Burns became known nationally, recognized as the announcer of all major boxing bouts between Philadelphia and Boston.

During the "Gentleman" Jim Corbett and Bob Fitzsimmons Heavyweight Championship in 1897 in Carson City, Nevada, a special telegraph was set up in the Lenox Lyceum in Manhattan which received all the details of the bout. Burns read out all the action, blow-by-blow, to a crowd of people becoming the first play-by-play sportscaster on record. The Corbett-Fitzsimmons Fight was, also, filmed by Enoch Rector lasting more than 100 minutes making it the first feature film in history.

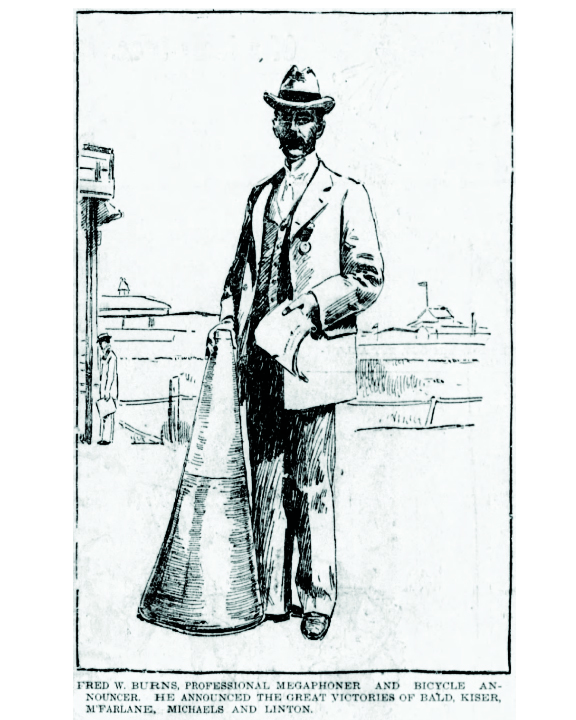
Burns with his megaphone in 1898

His announcing in cycling was tantamount to his involvement in the sport. It was in cycling that Burns introduced the world to the papier-mâché megaphone in 1894. He became known in the sporting world as the first professional megaphoner, a term commonly used for announcer until public address systems took over athletics in the 1930s. He announced some of the biggest cyclists of the time including: Jimmy Michael, Arthur Linton, Earl Kiser and Eddie Bald.

When automobiles became the new rage, Burns was called upon to announce the time tests. At the world's first automobile show held in Madison Square Garden in November 1900, the organizers engaged Burns as the announcer. When Henri Fournier, the best chauffeur (original term for race car driver) of his day, drove a world-record mile in 51.8 seconds against a head-wind during the race meetings of the Long Island Automobile Club, the man with the megaphone was Burns.

In 1894, the management of the New York Giants baseball club leveraged the services of Burns and Jack Adler to inform the crowds in lieu of using a bulletin board at the Polo Grounds. This Giants team went on to win the first Temple Cup over the original Baltimore Orioles. Several future Hall of Famers played for the team: shortstop George Davis, pitcher Amos Rusie, first baseman Roger Conner and manager/second baseman John Montgomery Ward.

Burns was involved, a member, founding member or a board member of the biggest athletic organizations such as the New York Athletic Club, Williamsburgh Athletic Club, Varuna Boat Club, Manhattan Athletic Club, Crescent Athletic Club and American Athletic Union including colleges and military. As a founding board member of the Brooklyn Athletic Association, he was heavily involved in the creation of the club in 1885. While in the process of putting the club together, a rival club emerged naming themselves the South Brooklyn Athletic Club, spearheaded by a group of prominent Brooklynites which including a young Charlie Ebbets and Timothy Woodruff. The Ebbets team quickly incorporated the Brooklyn Athletic Association to prevent the group, including Burns, Flannery and future New York City Police Commissioner John Partridge who were building their new club out of the old Williamsburgh Athletic Club from using it. In truth, they rushed to get their paperwork turned in only a half hour before the old W.A.C. crowd. Burns and his colleagues took great exception and began threatening legal action. To prevent litigation, the Brooklyn Athletic Association renamed themselves the Nassau Athletic Club where Ebbets became the first secretary. The Williamsburgh group took the name Brooklyn Athletic Association. By the end of 1887, Burns and Flannery had defected and joined the board of the Nassau Athletic Club, where Ebbets was now treasurer. At the end of 1889, the Brooklyn Athletic Association had gone under.

Burns not only announced but also, refereed boxing as well as acted as a starter at track meets and cycling/auto races. He was up for president of the League of American Wheelmen, in addition to boxing commissioner, as he was regarded for his fairness as a referee at bouts and organized athletic events. Along with athletics, he became a highly sought-after master of ceremonies at social affairs. On top of everything else, he managed wrestler Max Luttbeg.

Even at the Custom House where he was a broker, his announcing abilities came into play. During the start of the Tariffs of 1894 of Grover Cleveland's second presidency, a never before seen rush brokers trying withdrawal bonded goods from the Custom House. Using his stentorian voice, made all the official announcements and instructed the unruly crowd to "get in line".

He had a baritone voice and was regularly referred to as "Silver-tongued" or "Silvery-tongued". His articulate enunciation and clear explanations during events made him a primary choice of organizers along the eastern seaboard for any major affairs. At the time, Burns was the standard. People credited some of his success to his keen sense of humor.

== Father of sports announcing ==
Burns's announcing of athletic events inspired others to announce themselves. The biggest names to follow in Burns's stead were Jack Adler (earliest known horse racing announcer), Pete Prunty, Charles Harvey (famed boxing promoter who once extorted $25,000 out of Hitler for Max Schmelling to come to the United States for a championship bout against Steve Hamas), John P. Dunne and boxing's Joe Humphreys (inducted into the Boxing Hall of Fame). The only one of these men to ever use a Public Address System was Humphreys.

== Personal ==
Burns married Henrietta M "Anna" Van der Bosch in the early 1880s and they remained married until his death 1923 from Cardio Valvular Disease and Nephritis. They had two daughters, Florence and Gladyss. Both daughters were athletic like their parents. There is one story which indicates Florence was the first person to ever swim across the Hudson River. Anna and Florence were excellent pistol shots which would figure into Florence's murder case below.

Burns's sister, Eva, was a well-known contralto and lyricist who taught music in Brooklyn with her live-in boyfriend of 25 years, the esteemed Professor Albert Caswell.

His father-in-law, William Van der Bosch, was one of the principal engineers of the Brooklyn Bridge, highly regarded in the New York science community and considered the largest man in New York City at 6'4" and 300 lbs.

On February 15, 1902, 19-year-old Florence was arrested for the murder of her boyfriend, Walter Brooks. Upon the advice of his long-time friend and attorney, Foster Backus (who was also the president of the Brooklyn Athletic Association), Burns ceased announcing and left the state of New York to avoid subpoena by the prosecutor, William Travers Jerome. The original magistrate of the hearing, Robert C. Cornell, worked the Yale games with Burns. The New York City Police Commissioner who investigated the Church Street Police Departments 3rd Degree treatment of Florence, John N. Partridge, was the former president of the Williamsburgh Athletic Club. Timothy Woodruff, Lt. Governor of New York, was part of the Nassau Athletic Club.

His daughter was held for 5 weeks in the Tombs I, where she was attended to by the well-known Tombs Angel, during the hearing of the Court of Special Sessions. Noted many times, her trial was the most sensational in New York City history with hundreds crowding the courtroom and thousands in front of the Centre Street Court on the day of her release. Due to Florence's age, 5'8" height, golden hair, big blue eyes, attractive face and shapely figure, she would have been considered strikingly beautiful in a world where the typical woman averaged 5'2" in size. Due to this, many famous people of the time attended the hearings like socialite Harriet Hubbard Ayer (mostly known for starting the Cosmetics Industry but also, a journalist for Joseph Pulitzer's New York World) and illustrator Charles Dana Gibson (known for creating the Gibson Girl). Upon her release, she joined her family in New Jersey and they remained in hiding until her acquittal after the Coroner's Inquest in mid-May. After which, Burns returned to announcing. However, the number of events he announced significantly declined.

Burns is interred in the Tulip section of the Cemetery of the Evergreens in Brooklyn with his wife, daughter Florence, Bad Bill Dahlen and many, many others.
