= Nathaniel Boyd =

Canadian politician (1853–1941)

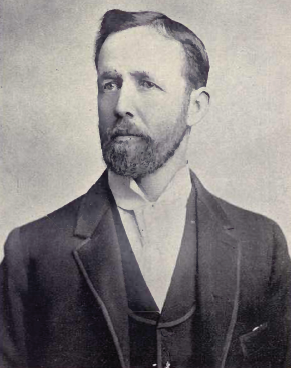

Member of the Canadian Parliament for Marquette
- In office 1892–1896
- Preceded by: Robert Watson
- Succeeded by: William James Roche

Member of the Canadian Parliament for Macdonald
- In office 1896–1897
- Preceded by: District was created in 1892
- Succeeded by: John Gunion Rutherford
- In office 1900–1904
- Preceded by: John Gunion Rutherford
- Succeeded by: William D. Staples

Personal details
- Born: July 9, 1853 Lachute, Canada East
- Died: November 9, 1941 (aged 88)
- Party: Conservative

Nathaniel Boyd (July 9, 1853 – November 9, 1941) was a Canadian politician.

Born in Lachute, Canada East, the son of Hugh Boyd and Maria Kilfoyle, Boyd attended common schools in Oxford County, Leeds and Grenville and studied at the Grammar School in Ottawa. After school, he worked with his father in railroad contracting and spent time working in telegraphy. He moved to Manitoba and worked as the chief train dispatcher and assistant superintendent for the Canadian Pacific Railway in Manitoba. Afterwards, he started a wholesale and retail lumber business in Winnipeg called Boyd and Crowe, which operated in the Point Douglas district of Winnipeg. In 1886, he started a ranching business with a ranch of 23,000 acres (93 km^{2}).

He first ran as the Conservative candidate for the House of Commons of Canada for the riding of Marquette in the 1891 federal election but was defeated. He was acclaimed in an 1892 by-election resulting from the resignation of the sitting MP, Robert Watson. He was re-elected in 1896 for the riding of Macdonald. The election was declared void in 1897 and Boyd did not run in the resulting by-election. He did run and win again in 1900 election and was defeated in 1904 election this time for the riding of Portage la Prairie.

He died at the age of 88 in 1941.

1896 Canadian federal election: Macdonald
Party	Candidate	Votes
Conservative	BOYD, Nathaniel	2,436
Liberal	RUTHERFORD, John G.	2,038
Patrons of Industry	Charles Braithwaite	1,259

1900 Canadian federal election: Macdonald
Party	Candidate	Votes
Conservative	BOYD, Nathaniel	3,866
Liberal	RUTHERFORD, John G.	3,710
