= Craig Stewart =

Craig Stewart may refer to:

- Craig Stewart (politician) (1928–2009), Canadian politician, MP for Marquette, 1968–1979
- Craig Stewart (Australian footballer) (1956–2023), Australian rules footballer
- Craig Stewart (English footballer), former English footballer and current head manager for the Providence Friars men's soccer team
- Craig Stewart (Jamaican footballer) from 2004 CFU Club Championship
- Craig Stewart (film editor) from Hard Hunted
