= François-Xavier Pagé =

François-Xavier Pagé (May 30, 1833 – February 24, 1912) was a farmer and political figure in Manitoba. He was a member of the Convention of Forty and served in the Legislative Assembly of Assiniboia.

His brother, Alexandre Pagé, was also a representative to the Convention of Forty.

== Life ==
François-Xavier Pagé was born on 30 May 1833 in St. François Xavier, Manitoba, to Joseph Pagé (b. 1783) and Agathe Letendré (b. 1790).

He married Philomène Lavallée (b. November 8, 1843, in Saint Boniface), daughter of François Lavallée and Josephte Morin. The couple had 14 children. According to the Red River Relief Committee, in 1867 Xavier Pagé had 1 horse, 3 oxen, and only harvested 40 bushels of wheat, suggesting that he made his living as a tripman for cart brigades.

Pagé was one of the representatives of Saint-François-Xavier to the Convention of Forty in January 1870 at the Red River Colony. On 19 January, Pagé was one of the four members of this convention (along with Ambroise-Dydime Lépine, John Sutherland, and John Fraser) who went to find out if William MacTavish still considered himself the governor of Assiniboia. MacTavish responded that he was devoid of all authority and strongly urged the formation of a new government. Returning to the convention with this news, Pagé raised the motion to adopt the Provisional Government with Louis Riel as president, becoming a councilor of the Provisional Government when it was formed. Pagé was sent out as a scout for the Métis at the approach of the Red River Expeditionary Force and was arrested along with François-Xavier Dauphinais and Pierre Poitras on 24 August 1870. He was called upon to testify at the trial of Ambroise Lépine in 1874.

He died in St. François Xavier at the age of 78.
