= Angus McKay (Manitoba politician) =

Canadian politician (1836–1910)

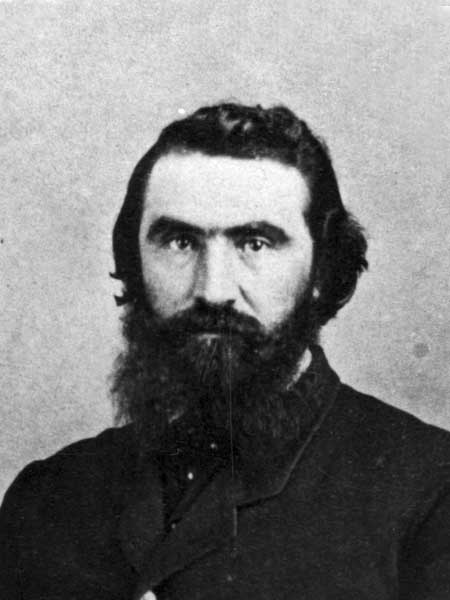

Member of the Legislative Assembly of Manitoba for Lake Manitoba
- In office 1870–1874

Member of Parliament for Marquette
- In office 2 March 1871 – 8 July 1872 Serving with James S. Lynch
- Preceded by: new district
- Succeeded by: Robert Cunningham

Personal details
- Born: 1 November 1836 Red River Colony
- Died: 1 September 1910 (aged 73) Berens River, Manitoba, Canada
- Party: Conservative Party
- Spouse(s): Virginia Roulette married c. 1870

Angus Augustin McKay (born Auguste McKay; 1 November 1836 – 1 September 1910) was a Canadian politician who represented the Conservative Party in the riding of Marquette, Manitoba. He was elected on 2 March 1871 in a by-election. His term ended on 8 July 1872. He was the first aboriginal Canadian elected to the House of Commons of Canada.

== Biography ==
He was born in 1836 at the Red River Colony. A Roman Catholic, McKay appears to have identified with the French-speaking community of his mother rather than with the English-speaking, Presbyterian background of his father, a Scottish fur trader. His mother's ancestors were Cree and French Canadian. His brother James was also a fur trader like their father.

== Political career ==
Although Métis, he was opposed to Louis Riel's (the spiritual leader of the Métis people) methods for dealing with the Canadian government. He was arrested by Riel in March 1870 because of his political stance. That same year he was elected to the Legislative Assembly of Manitoba in the riding of Lake Manitoba, and was reelected in 1874. McKay resigned in 1876 to make room for his brother James, who was elected to the seat by acclamation. Later in 1876, Angus McKay was appointed Indian agent for the areas covered by Treaty No. 4 including the Qu'Appelle Valley. In 1879, he was posted to the areas covered by Treaty No. 5 in northern Manitoba. The Department of Indian Affairs was charged with maintaining a positive public relations between Canada and the natives. However, "his reports were often sharply critical of the government's failure to live up to treaty promises and he passed on the complaints of the Indians." Despite his "stormy relationship" with the Department, he served until 1897.

== Personal ==
Angus McKay married Virginia Roulette around 1870. He died in 1910 at Berens River, Manitoba. He had been in declining health after suffering from apoplexy. He was buried at St. Boniface, Manitoba.
