= 170th New York Infantry Regiment =

- Active: October 7, 1862 - July 19, 1865
- Country: United States
- Allegiance: Union
- Branch: Infantry
- Size: 1002
- Engagements: Battle of Deserted House; Siege of Suffolk; Battle of Edonton Road; Battle of Holland House; Battle of Spotsylvania Court House; Battle of North Anna; Battle of Totopotomoy Creek; Battle of Cold Harbor; Siege of Petersburg; Second Battle of Petersburg; Battle of Jerusalem Plank Road; Second Battle of Deep Bottom; Second Battle of Ream's Station; Battle of Hatcher's Run; Battle of Watkins' House; Appomattox Campaign; Battle of Sailor's Creek; Battle of High Bridge; Battle of Appomattox Court House

The 170th New York Infantry Regiment was an infantry regiment in the Union Army during the American Civil War.

== Service ==
The 170th New York Infantry was organized at New York City, New York, and mustered on October 7, 1862, at Staten Island under the command of Colonel Peter McDermott. It was one of the four regiments forming the brigade of Irish soldiers known as the Corcoran Legion.

The regiment was attached to District of Newport News, Virginia, Department of Virginia, to December, 1862 Corcoran's Brigade, Division at Suffolk, Virginia, VII Corps, Department of Virginia, to April 1863. 3rd Brigade, 1st Division, VII Corps, to July 1863. Corcoran's Brigade, King's Division, XXII Corps, Department of Washington, to November 1863. 1st Brigade, Corcoran's Division, XXII Corps, to December 1863. 2nd Brigade, Tyler's Division, XXII Corps, to May 1864. 4th Brigade, 2nd Division, II Corps, Army of the Potomac, to June 1864. 2nd Brigade, 2nd Division, II Corps, to July 1865.

The 170th New York Infantry mustered out of service July 19, 1865, at Raleigh, North Carolina.

== Detailed service ==
- Left New York for Washington, D.C., October 16, 1862;
- Newport News, Va. Duty at Newport News, Va., until December 1862, and at Suffolk, Va., until May 1863.
  - Action at Deserted House January 30, 1863.
- Siege of Suffolk April 12-May 4.
  - Edenton Road April 15. Attack on Suffolk April 24.
  - Providence Church Road, Nansemond River, May 3.
  - Siege of Suffolk raised May 4.
- Operations on Seaboard & Roanoke Railroad May 12–26.
- Blackwater May 12.
- Holland House, Carrsville, May 15–16.
- Carrsville May 18.
- Dix's Peninsula Campaign June 24-July 7.
- Moved to Washington, D.C., July 12. Duty in and about that city and guard duty on the Orange & Alexandria Railroad until May 1864.
- Ordered to join the Army of the Potomac in the field.
- Rapidan Campaign May 17-June 15.
  - Spotsylvania Court House May 17–21.
  - North Anna River May 23–26.
  - On line of the Pamunkey May 26–28.
  - Totopotomoy May 28–31.
  - Cold Harbor June 1–12.
- Before Petersburg June 16–18.
- Siege of Petersburg June 16, 1864, to April 2, 1865.
  - Jerusalem Plank Road, Weldon Railroad, June 22–23, 1864.
  - Demonstration on north side of the James July 27–29.
  - Deep Bottom July 27–28.
  - Demonstration north of the James August 13–20.
  - Strawberry Plains, Deep Bottom, August 14–18.
  - Ream's Station August 25.
  - Boydton Plank Road, Hatcher's Run, October 27–28.
  - Dabney's Mills, Hatcher's Run, February 5–7, 1865.
  - Watkins' House March 25.
- Appomattox Campaign March 28-April 9.
  - Boydton and White Oak Roads March 30–31.
  - Crow's House March 31.
  - Fall of Petersburg April 2.
  - Pursuit of Lee April 3–9.
    - Sailor's Creek April 6.
    - High Bridge, Farmville, April 7.
    - Appomattox Court House April 9.
- Surrender of Lee and his army. At Burkesville until May 2.
- March to Washington, D. C., May 2–12.
- Grand Review of the Armies May 23.
- Duty at Washington, D.C., until July.

== Gallery ==
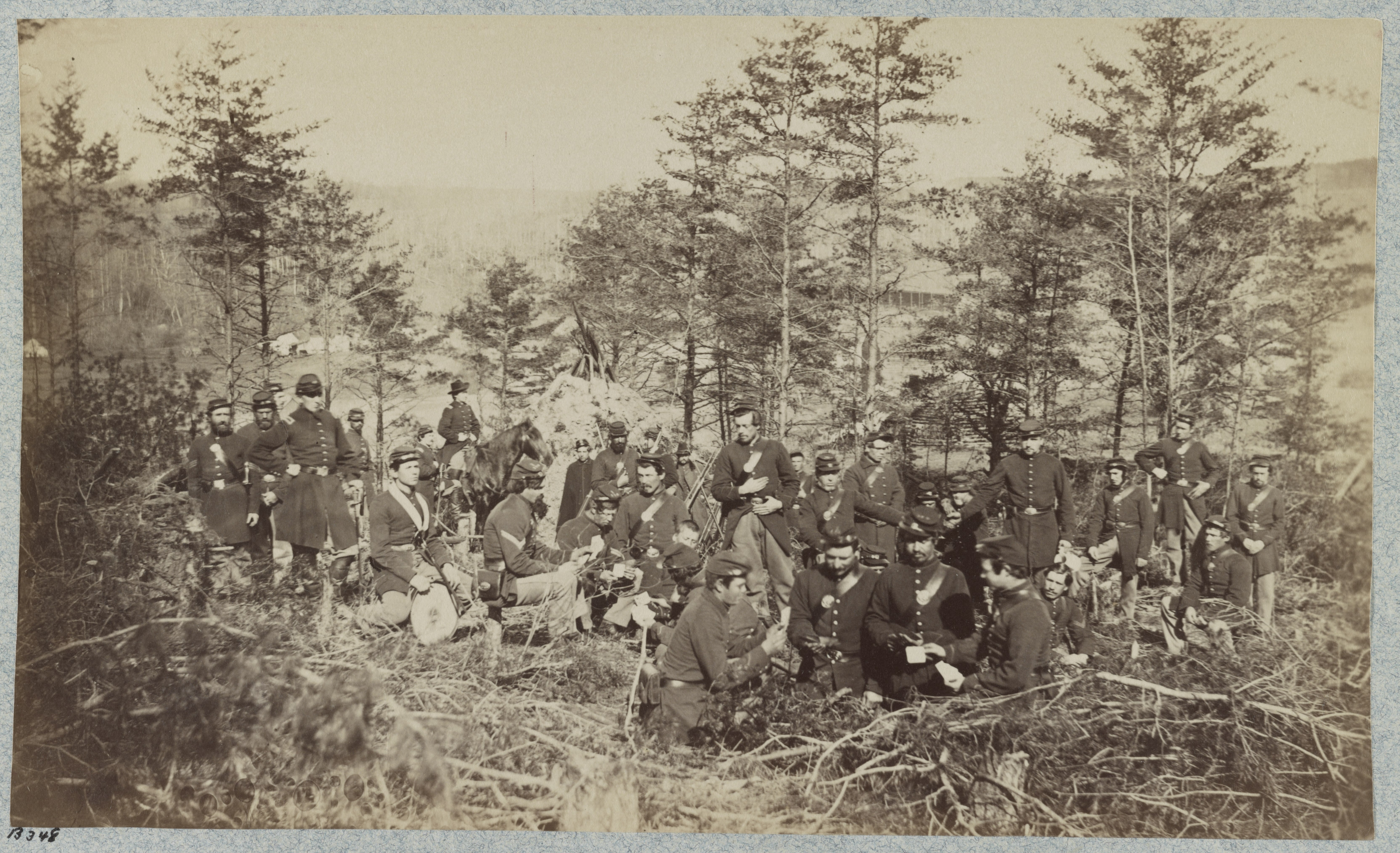
Co. - , 170th New York Infantry

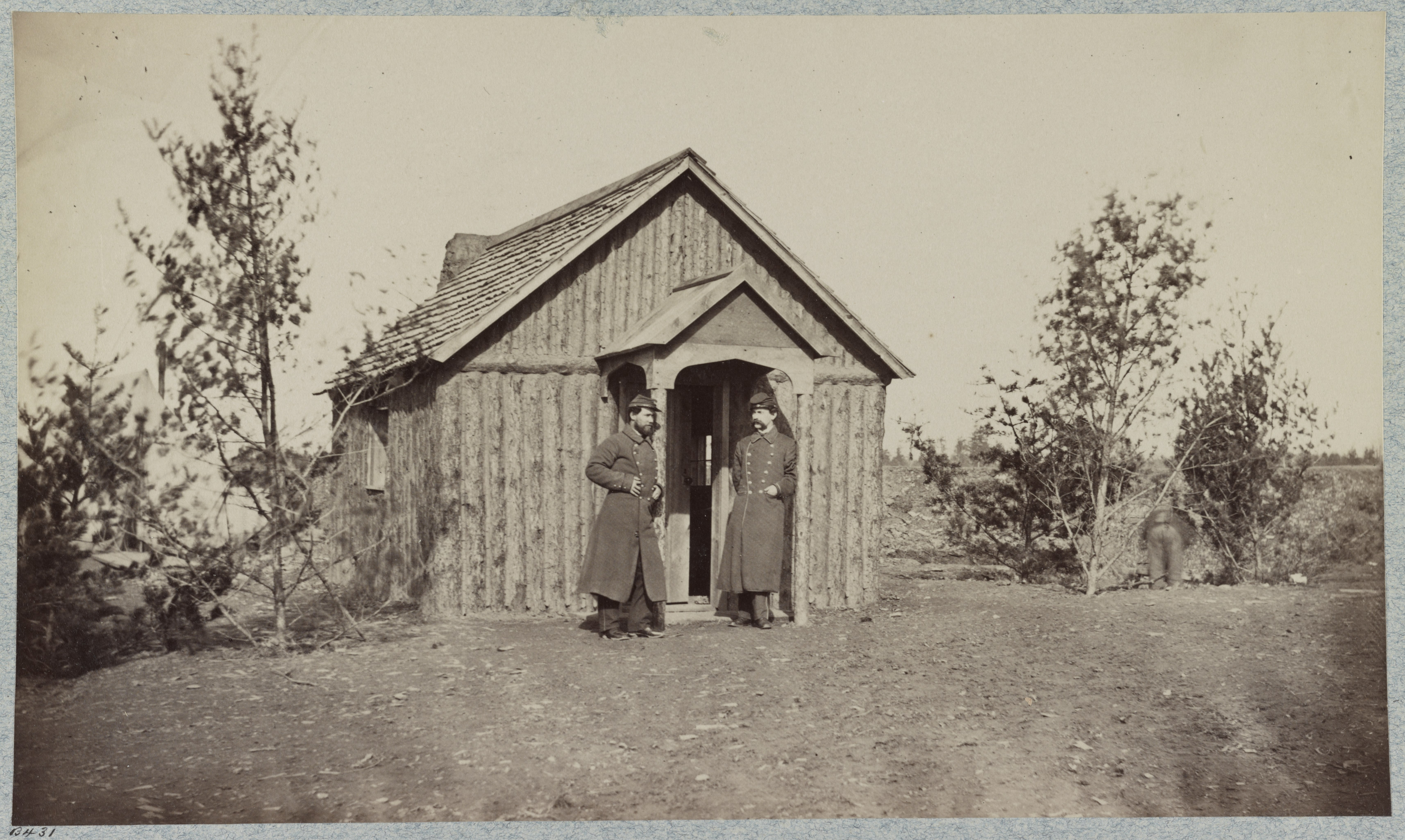
Officers of 170th New York Infantry

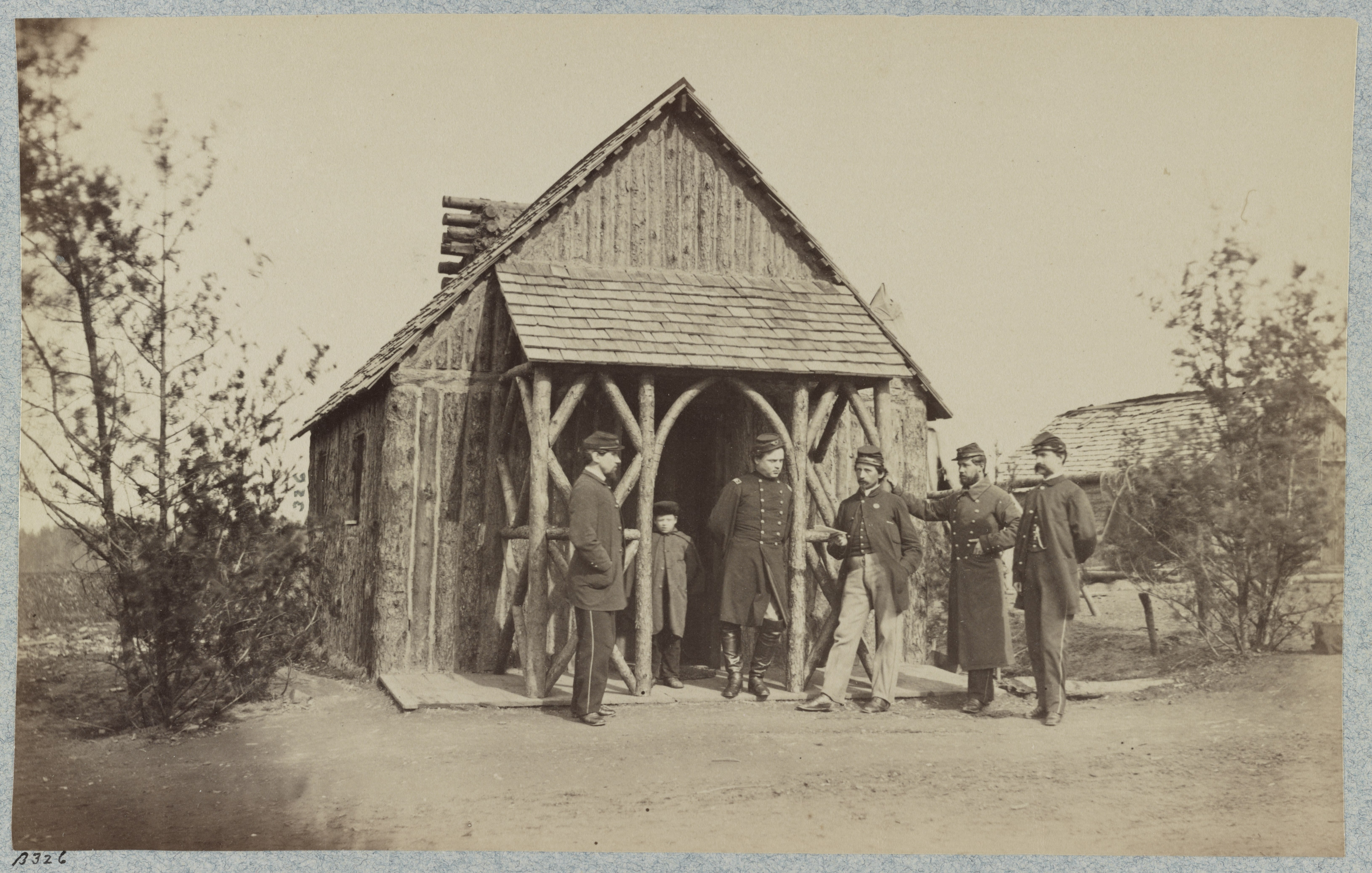
Officers of 170th New York Infantry

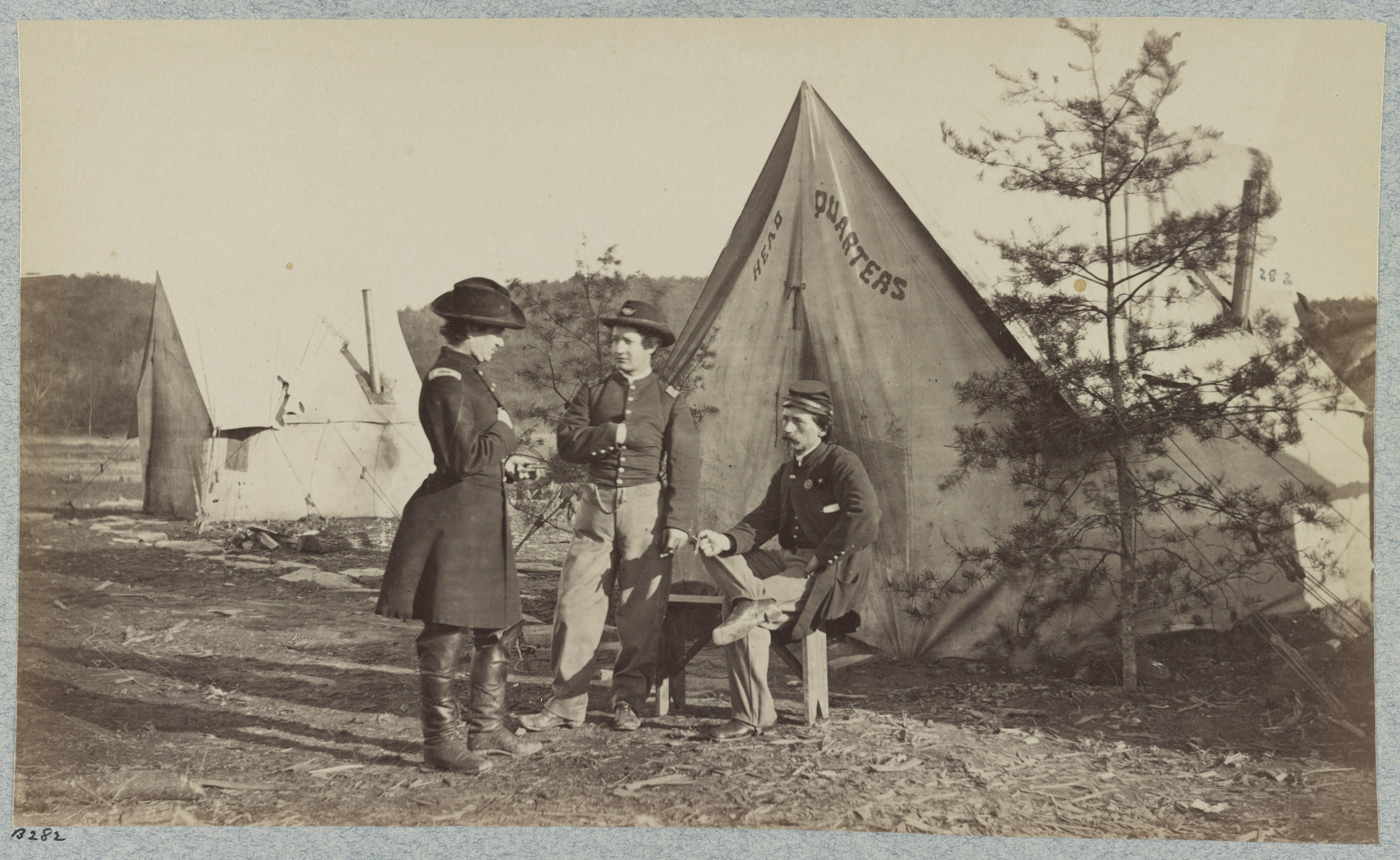
Officers of 170th New York Infantry

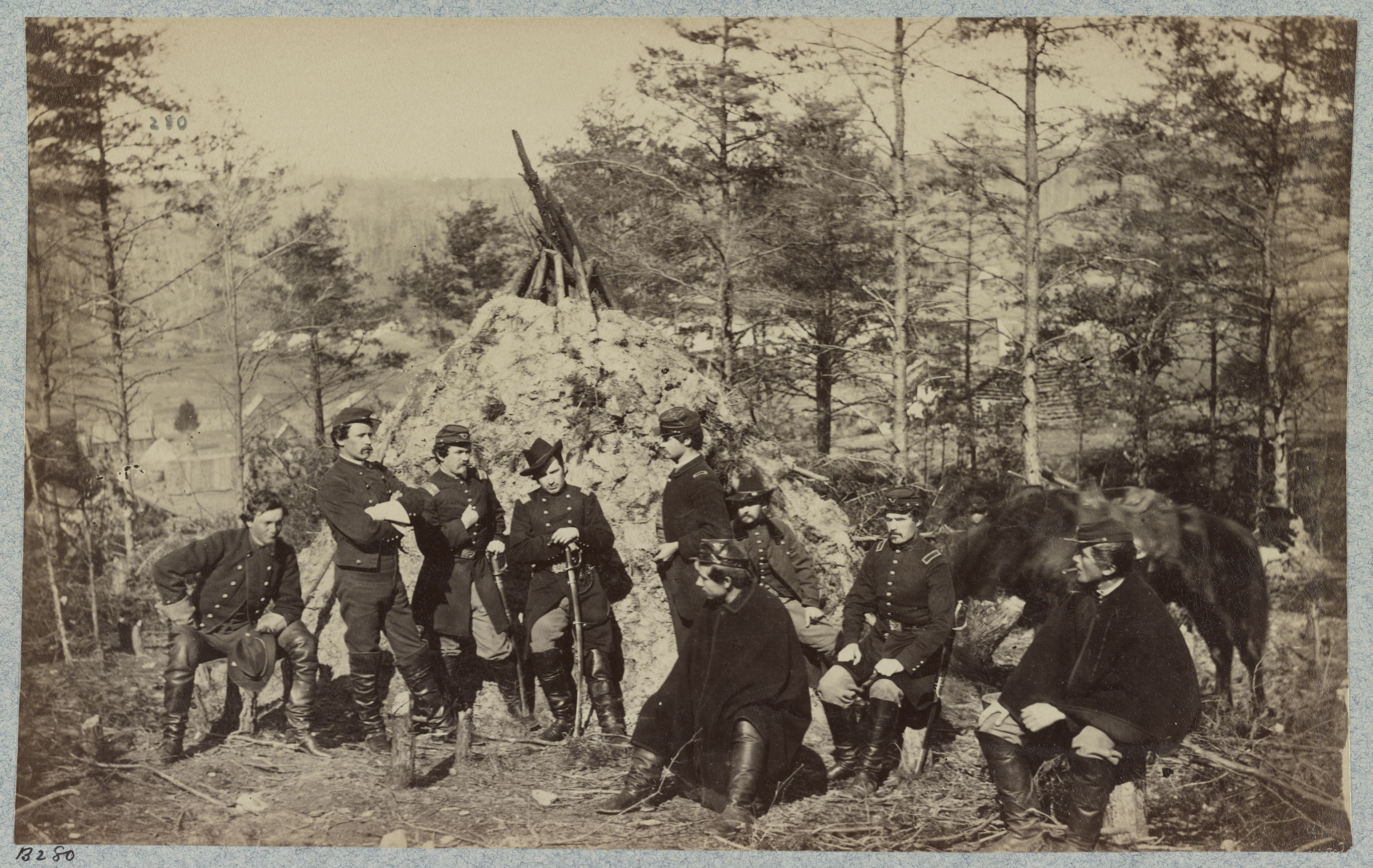
Officers of 164th and 170th New York Infantry

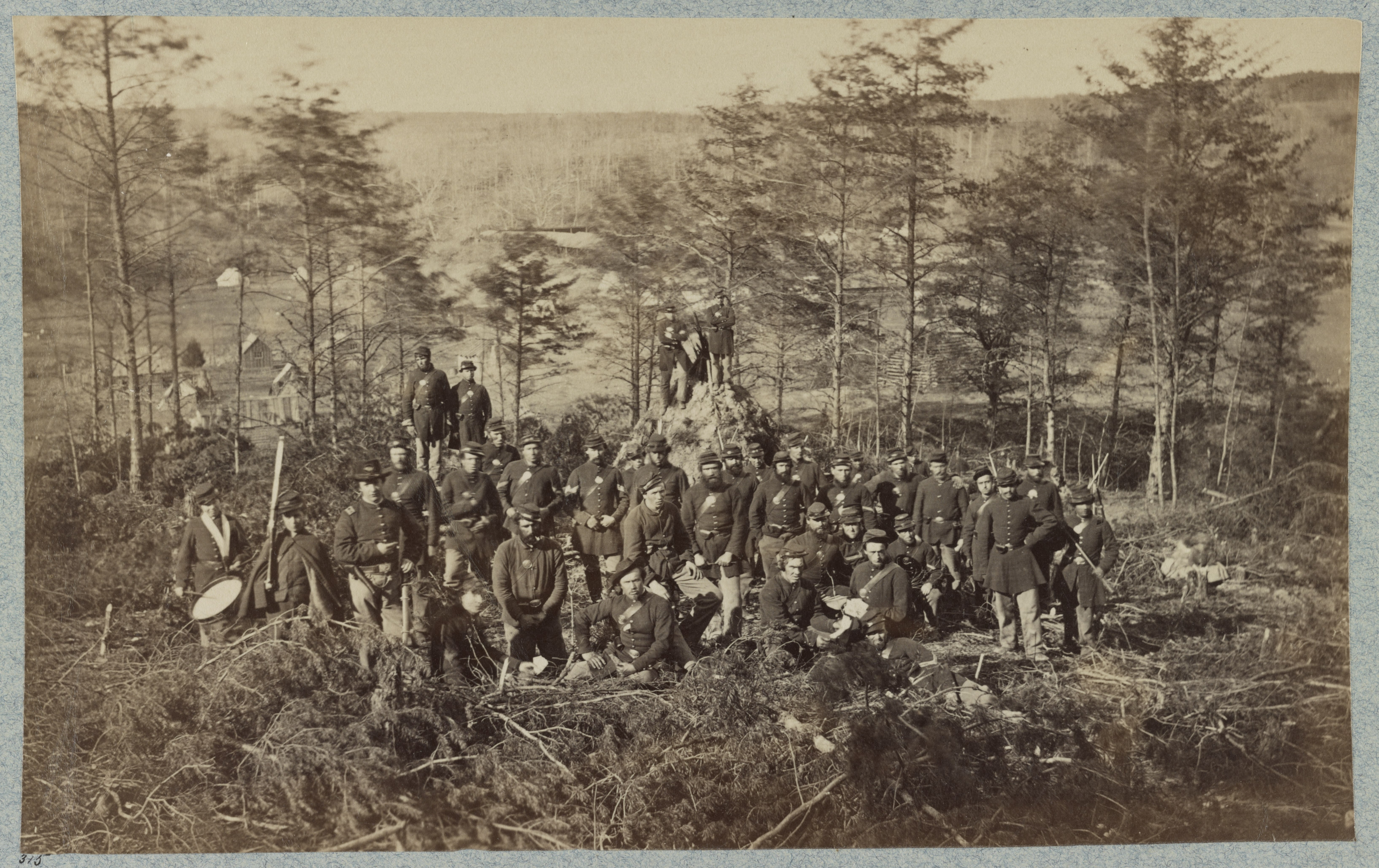
Co. - , 170th New York Infantry on reserve picket duty

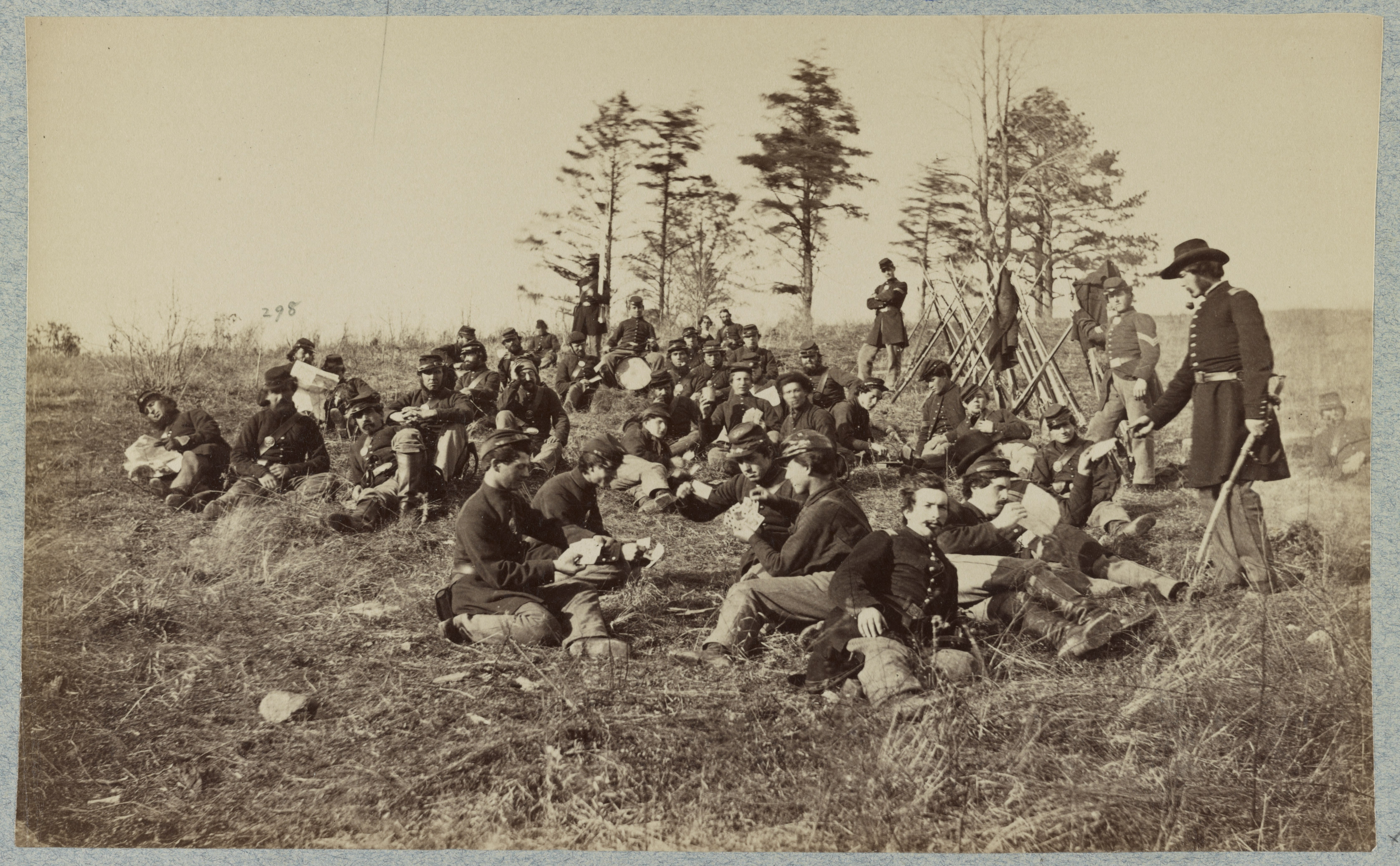
Company "B", 170th N.Y. Infantry in front of Petersburg

== Casualties ==
The regiment lost a total of 227 men during service; 10 officers and 119 enlisted men killed or mortally wounded, 2 officers and 96 enlisted men died of disease. 12.8% of the men who served would die during the regiment's time of service.

== Commanders ==
- Colonel Peter McDermott - discharged January 4, 1863
- Colonel James Patrick McIvor
- Lieutenant Colonel Michael Cotter Murphy

== Notable members ==
- Lieutenant Colonel Michael Cotter Murphy - Medal of Honor recipient for action at the Battle of North Anna River; dismissed from the service June 4, 1864, due to disability
- Captain Hugh Francis "Bob" O'Lone, Company F - active in Canadian politics; member of the Convention of Forty and served in the Legislative Assembly of Assiniboia

== See also ==
- List of New York Civil War regiments
- New York in the Civil War
