= Joseph O'Connell Ryan =

Canadian politician

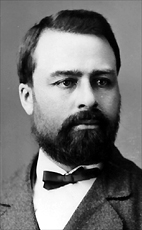

Member of Parliament for Marquette
- In office 1874–1878
- Preceded by: Robert Cunningham
- Succeeded by: Joseph O'Connell Ryan
- In office 1878–1882
- Preceded by: Joseph O'Connell Ryan
- Succeeded by: Robert Watson

Personal details
- Born: 18 December 1841 Dunnville, Canada West, Province of Canada
- Died: 26 July 1938 (aged 96) Los Angeles, California, USA
- Party: Liberal
- Spouse: Mary Helena Macmanamin
- Profession: barrister, editor

Joseph O'Connell Ryan (18 December 1841 – 26 July 1938) was a Canadian politician, barrister and editor.

Born in Dunnville, Canada West, the son of John O'Connell and the former Miss Ryan, he was educated at Regiopolis College; he adopted his mother's surname. In 1868, he married Mary Helena Macmanamin. He was editor of the British American in Kingston in 1870. Ryan was called to the Ontario bar in 1869 and to the Manitoba bar in 1872. He practised law in Portage la Prairie.

He was elected to the House of Commons of Canada as a Member of the Liberal Party in an 1874 by-election to represent the riding of Marquette after losing the election earlier that year to Robert Cunningham. He was acclaimed in a by-election in 1878. From 1882 to 1916, Ryan was judge in the County Court for the Central Judicial District in Manitoba.

He died in Los Angeles, California at the age of 96.
