= John McTavish =

John McTavish, John MacTavish, or variant thereof, may refer to:

== People ==
=== McTavish ===
- John George McTavish (c. 1778–1847), Scottish-born fur trader
- John McTavish (footballer, born 1885) (1885–1944), Scottish footballer
- John McTavish (footballer, born 1932) (1932–2025), Scottish footballer
- John McTavish (politician) (1837–1888), Canadian politician

=== MacTavish ===
- John MacTavish (British Consul) (1787–1852), Scots-Canadian who served as British consul to Maryland

== Fictional characters ==
- Soap MacTavish, John MacTavish, from the videogame series "Call of Duty"
