= Ogletree =

Ogletree is a surname. Notable people with the surname include:

- Alec Ogletree (born 1991), American football player
- Al Ogletree (1930–2019), American baseball coach
- Andy Ogletree (born 1998), American golfer
- Artemus Ogletree (1915–1935), American victim of an unsolved murder
- Charles Ogletree (1952–2023), American professor
- Charlie Ogletree (born 1967), American sailor
- Craig Ogletree (1968–2021), American football player
- Drew Ogletree (born 1998), American football player
- Francis Ogletree (1826–1916), Canadian farmer and politician
- Kevin Ogletree (born 1987), American football player
- Mike Ogletree (born 1956), Scottish drummer
- Renae Ogletree (1950–2010), American activist
