= John Lazarus Norquay =

Canadian politician (1847–1913)

John Lazarus Norquay Sr. (April 19, 1837 – December 24, 1913) was a farmer and political figure in Manitoba who served in the Legislative Assembly of Assiniboia.

He was the son of Henry Norquay and Mary Monkman, both Métis and married Mary Sanderson in the late 1850s. Norquay farmed in the High Bluff district during the early 1860s. Around 1877, he moved to Mountain Gap, Little Saskatchewan Valley. By 1901, Norquay was living in Grandview. He died there at the age of 76.

His younger cousin John Norquay, sometimes referred to as John Norquay Jr., served as premier of Manitoba.
