= William Cowan (fur trader) =

Canadian fur trader (1818–1902)

Doctor William Cowan (c. 1818 – June 20, 1902) was a physician and fur trader.

He was born in Scotland in about 1818 and studied medicine at the University of Glasgow. He caught cholera during the epidemic of 1848–1849 and decided to move to British North America for his health. He went to Upper Fort Garry in the Red River settlement as a physician for a group being sent there.

In 1852, he was appointed chief magistrate and became a member of the Council of Assiniboia the following year. Cowan joined the Hudson's Bay Company as a doctor and fur trader and, in 1856, he was sent to Moose Factory. He became chief trader there in 1860. In 1862, he returned to Upper Fort Garry as second-in-command to the governor of Assiniboia, William Mactavish.

On November 2, 1869, Louis Riel and the National Committee took control of Upper Fort Garry. Cowan spent the winter under house arrest but is believed to have been sympathetic to Riel's group. In the spring, Cowan left the colony and returned to Britain on furlough.

On his retirement in 1871, Cowan returned to Saint Paul, Minnesota. In 1879, he helped establish the Manitoba Historical Society and served as its president from 1881 to 1882. He served as an honorary consultant for the Winnipeg General Hospital, incorporated in 1882. In 1885, he returned to St. Paul and died there in 1902.

Cowan's journals served as an important record of the early events in the Red River Rebellion.
