= Legislative Council of Manitoba =

Canadian legislature, 1870 to 1876

Legislative Council of Manitoba Conseil législatif du Manitoba

Type
- Type: Upper house of the Legislature of Manitoba

History
- Founded: 1870
- Disbanded: 1876
- Preceded by: Council of Assiniboia
- Succeeded by: None

Structure
- Seats: 7
- Length of term: Life

Meeting place
- Fort Garry, 1870–73; Winnipeg, 1873–76

Constitution
- Manitoba Act

The Legislative Council of Manitoba (French: Conseil législatif du Manitoba) was the upper house of the Legislature of Manitoba. Created in 1870 and abolished in 1876, the council was the only provincial upper house in Canada that was not a continuation of a pre-Confederation upper house. It was also the first provincial upper house to be abolished.

== History ==
The council was created under the provisions of the Manitoba Act. Even prior to Manitoba's entry into Confederation, the utility of provincial upper houses was questioned by many Canadians; the Legislative Assembly of Ontario had proved the ability of provincial Legislative Assemblies to rule alone. However, the Francophone Métis population wanted to model the government in Manitoba on what had already been created for Quebec. There, the Legislative Council had been retained and was seen as a means to protect the interests of religious and linguistic minorities inside the province. In this, they easily gained the agreement of Prime Minister Sir John A. Macdonald, who firmly believed in the necessity of an unelected upper house, which he had written into the federal constitution.

During its brief existence, members of the Legislative Council were appointed by the lieutenant governor of Manitoba. However, by 1874, the new province's finances were in trouble, and the government had to appeal to Ottawa for aid. By this time, Macdonald had been replaced as prime minister by Alexander Mackenzie. Mackenzie's government agreed to provide aid, but demanded that the Legislative Council be eliminated as a cost-cutting measure. The council initially resisted, rejecting bills to abolish itself in 1874 and 1875. Finally in 1876, following the mediation of Lieutenant Governor Alexander Morris who had promised the recalcitrant councillors lucrative government positions elsewhere, the Legislative Council was abolished.

== List of legislative councillors ==
Member	District	First Appointed	Notes
James McKay		1871	Speaker 1871–1874
Colin Inkster	Kildonan	1871	Speaker 1876
Francis Ogletree	Portage la Prairie	1871	
Donald Gunn	St. Andrews	1871	
François Dauphinais	St. Norbert	1871	
Salomon Hamelin	White Horse Plains	1871	
John Harrison O'Donnell	Winnipeg	1871	Speaker 1875

== See also ==
- Legislative Council
