= Nick Mandziuk =

Canadian politician

- Official 1966 portrait

MP for Marquette
- In office 1957–1968
- Preceded by: Stuart Garson
- Succeeded by: Craig Stewart

Personal details
- Born: 13 December 1902 Ukraine
- Died: 7 September 1969 (aged 66)
- Party: Progressive Conservative
- Occupation: lawyer

J. Nicholas Mandziuk (13 December 1902 – 7 September 1969) was a Canadian politician in Manitoba. He represented the electoral district of Marquette in the House of Commons of Canada from 1957 to 1968.

He was a member of the Progressive Conservative Party.
