= William Garrioch =

Canadian politician

William Garrioch Jr. (July 4, 1828 – February 7, 1916) was a farmer and political figure in Manitoba who served in the Legislative Assembly of Assiniboia.

He was the son of William Garrioch, a native of Scotland, and Nancy Cook, of Métis descent. Around 1851, Garrioch married Mary Brown. They first settled in St. Peter's parish but later moved to St. Mary's la Prairie. He was named a justice of the peace by 1872. In 1872, the family moved to Kinosota on Lake Manitoba.

He died in Westbourne at the age of 87.
