= Louis Lacerte =

Canadian politician in Manitoba

Louis Lacerte (January 15, 1821 – December 30, 1882) was a blacksmith, merchant and political figure in Manitoba. He was a member of Louis Riel's "Convention of Twenty-Four" and "Convention of Forty" and served in the Legislative Assembly of Assiniboia.

He was born in Rupert's Land, the son of Louis Lacerte Sr. and Marie Martin, both of Métis descent. Lacerte was married twice: first to Josephte Vandal prior to 1844 and then to Charlotte Lesperance in 1879 following his first wife's death. He worked for the Hudson's Bay Company until 1848 and then had moved to Pembina, North Dakota by 1850. By 1870, Lacerte was living in St. Norbert parish. He served as a school commissioner and as overseer of highways for the parish.

He died in St. Norbert in 1882.
