= Baptiste Tourond =

Jean-Baptiste Tourond (June 1, 1838 – April 25, 1891) was a farmer and political figure in Manitoba. He was a member of Louis Riel's "Convention of Twenty-Four" and "Convention of Forty" and served in the Legislative Assembly of Assiniboia.

He was born in St. Boniface, Red River Settlement, the son of Joseph Tourond, a native of France, and Rosalie Laderoute, of Métis descent. He married Angélique Delorme in 1861. Tourond owned a farm in St. Norbert. In 1869, he was part of a group organized by Riel to stop Canadians from staking claims in Métis parishes. Tourond was a founding member of the Societé Agricole du Comté de Provencher and served as one of its first directors and also served on the board of directors for the Provincial Agricultural Association. He was also a school commissioner and a justice of the peace and served as deputy sheriff for the judicial district of Provencher. In 1881, he married Régina Allard following the death of his first wife.

He died in Ritchot at the age of 52.
