= Marquette (federal electoral district) =

Former federal electoral district in Manitoba, Canada

Marquette was a federal electoral district in Manitoba, Canada, that was due to be represented in the House of Commons of Canada in 1871 and 1872 and was represented from 1872 to 1979. A tie was declared in the by-election held in 1871. Neither leading candidate was allowed to take the seat in the House of Commons. The disputed election was not resolved prior to the 1872 election.

This riding was created in 1871 following the creation of the province of Manitoba in 1870. The seat was first filled in the 1872 election.

It was abolished in 1976 when it was redistributed into Brandon—Souris, Dauphin and Portage—Marquette ridings.

== Members of Parliament ==
This riding has elected the following members of Parliament:

Parliament	Years	Member	Party	Member	Party
1st	1870–1872	James S. Lynch	Liberal	Angus McKay	Conservative
2nd	1872–1874	Robert Cunningham	Liberal		
2nd	1874–1874	Robert Cunningham	Liberal		
3rd	1874–1878	Joseph O'Connell Ryan	Liberal		
4th	1878–1878	John A. Macdonald	Conservative		
4th	1878–1878	Joseph O'Connell Ryan	Liberal		
5th	1882–1887	Robert Watson	Liberal		
6th	1887–1891	Robert Watson	Liberal		
6th	1891–1892	Robert Watson	Liberal		
6th	1892–1896	Nathaniel Boyd	Conservative		
8th	1896–1900	William James Roche	Conservative		
9th	1900–1904	William James Roche	Conservative		
10th	1904–1908	William James Roche	Conservative		
11th	1908–1911	William James Roche	Conservative		
12th	1911–1911	William James Roche	Conservative		
12th	1911–1917	William James Roche	Conservative		
13th	1917–1921	Thomas Alexander Crerar	Conservative		
14th	1921–1925	Thomas Alexander Crerar	Progressive		
15th	1925–1926	Henry Alfred Mullins	Conservative		
16th	1926–1930	James Allison Glen	Liberal–Progressive		
17th	1930–1935	Henry Alfred Mullins	Conservative		
18th	1935–1940	James Allison Glen	Liberal–Progressive		
19th	1940–1945	James Allison Glen	Liberal–Progressive		
20th	1945–1948	James Allison Glen	Liberal		
20th	1948–1949	Stuart Sinclair Garson	Liberal		
21st	1949–1953	Stuart Sinclair Garson	Liberal		
22nd	1953–1957	Stuart Sinclair Garson	Liberal		
23rd	1957–1958	Nick Mandziuk	Progressive Conservative		
24th	1958–1962	Nick Mandziuk	Progressive Conservative		
25th	1962–1963	Nick Mandziuk	Progressive Conservative		
26th	1963–1965	Nick Mandziuk	Progressive Conservative		
27th	1965–1968	Nick Mandziuk	Progressive Conservative		
28th	1968–1972	Craig Stewart	Progressive Conservative		
29th	1972–1974	Craig Stewart	Progressive Conservative		
30th	1972–1979	Craig Stewart	Progressive Conservative		

== Election results ==
By-election: As a result of Manitoba joining Confederation, 15 July 1870

By-election on 2 March 1871
Party	Candidate	Votes
Liberal	James S. Lynch	282
Conservative	Angus McKay	282

Due to the election being tied, both served in the House of Commons.

1872 Canadian federal election
Party	Candidate	Votes
Liberal	Robert Cunningham	393
Conservative	John Norquay	115
Liberal	James S. Lynch	71
Unknown	Pascal Breland	5

1874 Canadian federal election
Party	Candidate	Votes
Liberal	Robert Cunningham	393
Liberal	Joseph O'Connell Ryan	351

By-election: During trial of election petition, 25 August 1874 Ryan was declared the sitting member, as a result of the scrutiny of votes.

By-election on 25 August 1874
Party	Candidate	Votes
Liberal	Joseph O'Connell Ryan	351
Liberal	Robert Cunningham	329

1878 Canadian federal election
Party	Candidate	Votes
Liberal–Conservative	John A. Macdonald	acclaimed
Source(s) Library of Parliament – History of Federal Ridings since 1867: Marquette

By-election: On Mr. Macdonald being appointed Prime Minister of Canada, 16 October 1878. Macdonald chose to run in another riding in his ministerial by-election.

By-election on 30 November 1878
Party	Candidate	Votes
Liberal	Joseph O'Connell Ryan	acclaimed

1882 Canadian federal election
Party	Candidate	Votes
Liberal	Robert Watson	1,074
Conservative	E. McDonald	886

1887 Canadian federal election
Party	Candidate	Votes
Liberal	Robert Watson	2,148
Conservative	Charles Arkoll Boulton	2,090

1891 Canadian federal election
Party	Candidate	Votes
Liberal	WATSON, Robert	2,265
Conservative	BOYD, Nathaniel	2,219

By-election: On Mr. Watson's resignation

By-election on 15 July 1892
Party	Candidate	Votes
Conservative	BOYD, Nathaniel	acclaimed

1896 Canadian federal election
Party	Candidate	Votes
Conservative	ROCHE, W.J.	1,533
Liberal	ASHDOWN, J.H.	1,466
Patrons of Industry	MARSHALL, G.A.J.A.	472

1900 Canadian federal election
Party	Candidate	Votes
Conservative	ROCHE, William James	2,809
Liberal	THOMPSON, J.W.	2,387

1904 Canadian federal election
Party	Candidate	Votes
Conservative	ROCHE, W.J.	2,594
Liberal	HEAD, Sampson Leslie	2,521

1908 Canadian federal election
Party	Candidate	Votes
Conservative	ROCHE, William James	3,285
Liberal	JACKSON, Malcolm Bruce	2,715

1911 Canadian federal election
Party	Candidate	Votes
Conservative	ROCHE, William James	3,409
Liberal	GRIERSON, George Allison	3,283

By-election: On Mr. Roche being appointed Secretary of State for Canada, 10 October 1911

By-election on 27 October 1911
Party	Candidate	Votes
Conservative	ROCHE, Hon. W.J.	acclaimed

1917 Canadian federal election
Party	Candidate	Votes
Government (Unionist)	CRERAR, Hon. Thomas Alexander	8,672
Opposition (Laurier Liberals)	HAMILTON, Frederick Charles	1,152

1921 Canadian federal election
Party	Candidate	Votes
Progressive	CRERAR, Hon. Thomas Alexander	9,873
Independent	DYER, Hugh Marshall	4,307
Liberal	STUBBS, Lewis St. George	553

1925 Canadian federal election
Party	Candidate	Votes
Conservative	MULLINS, Henry Alfred	4,219
Progressive	STEVENSON, Charles Stuart	4,084
Liberal	IVERACH, William	1,665

1926 Canadian federal election
Party	Candidate	Votes
Liberal–Progressive	GLEN, James Allison	7,327
Conservative	MULLINS, Henry Alfred	6,235

1930 Canadian federal election
Party	Candidate	Votes
Conservative	MULLINS, Henry Alfred	8,663
Liberal–Progressive	GLEN, James Allison	5,979

1935 Canadian federal election
Party	Candidate	Votes
Liberal–Progressive	GLEN, James Allison	6,850
Conservative	PEDEN, Robert	5,010
Co-operative Commonwealth	BROWN, John Brownlee	3,877

1940 Canadian federal election
Party	Candidate	Votes
Liberal–Progressive	GLEN, James Allison	7,027
Independent	EWBANK, James Wilson	5,259
National Government	PEDEN, Robert	4,545

1945 Canadian federal election
Party	Candidate	Votes
Liberal	GLEN, Hon. James Allison	6,367
Co-operative Commonwealth	EWBANK, James Wilson	5,098
Progressive Conservative	WEBB, Alfred Oliver	5,062

By-election: On Mr. Glen's resignation, 4 November 1948

By-election on 20 December 1948
Party	Candidate	Votes
Liberal	GARSON, Hon. Stuart Sinclair	7,421
Co-operative Commonwealth	KEATING, Bessie	2,974

1949 Canadian federal election
Party	Candidate	Votes
Liberal	GARSON, Hon. Stuart Sinclair	10,144
Progressive Conservative	JACKSON, James	4,016
Co-operative Commonwealth	KEATING, Bessie	2,984

1953 Canadian federal election
Party	Candidate	Votes
Liberal	GARSON, Hon. Stuart Sinclair	9,900
Progressive Conservative	BATES, Ernest Arthur	4,676
Social Credit	CLINK, David Lyall	3,509

1957 Canadian federal election
Party	Candidate	Votes
Progressive Conservative	MANDZIUK, Nicholas	9,695
Liberal	GARSON, Stuart Sinclair	7,190
Social Credit	NEVIN, William	3,959
Co-operative Commonwealth	BATTERS, Melvin James	1,288

1958 Canadian federal election
Party	Candidate	Votes
Progressive Conservative	MANDZIUK, Nicholas	14,748
Liberal	KINNEY, David Arthur	5,598
Co-operative Commonwealth	SOTAS, Michael J.	1,572
Social Credit	NEVIN, William	993

1962 Canadian federal election
Party	Candidate	Votes
Progressive Conservative	MANDZIUK, Nick	11,366
Liberal	HUSTON, Harris	6,494
Social Credit	MCKEAND, Jim	2,256
New Democratic	BARBER, Stuart	1,553

1963 Canadian federal election
Party	Candidate	Votes
Progressive Conservative	MANDZIUK, Nick	11,729
Liberal	HUSTON, Harris	6,709
Social Credit	DONOVAN, Walter	2,036
New Democratic	SOTAS, Michael J.	981

1965 Canadian federal election
Party	Candidate	Votes
Progressive Conservative	MANDZIUK, Nick	10,613
Liberal	USICK, Rudy	6,424
New Democratic	ANTONATION, Michael S.	1,724
Social Credit	MCKEAND, J.D.	1,623

1968 Canadian federal election
Party	Candidate	Votes
Progressive Conservative	STEWART, Craig	12,706
Liberal	CLEMENT, Rod	9,183
New Democratic	ANTONATION, Michael S.	3,651
Independent	DONOVAN, Walter	593

1972 Canadian federal election
Party	Candidate	Votes
Progressive Conservative	STEWART, Craig	16,155
New Democratic	HOUSTON, Ken	4,917
Liberal	LACHTER, Sidney N.	4,572

1974 Canadian federal election
Party	Candidate	Votes
Progressive Conservative	STEWART, Craig	15,933
Liberal	LYTLE, Allan	4,498
New Democratic	LELOND, Maude A.	3,094
Independent	MORRISON, Kenneth B.	286

== See also ==
- List of Canadian electoral districts
- Historical federal electoral districts of Canada
