= William Sirett =

Canadian politician

William Flowers Sirett (April 8, 1848 – December 5, 1923) was an English-born farmer and political figure in Manitoba. He represented Beautiful Plains from 1896 to 1899 in the Legislative Assembly of Manitoba as a Patrons of Industry member.

He was born in Croughton, Northamptonshire, was educated in England and in Canada and farmed in Ontario for several years. Sirett married Margaret Symington in 1873. In 1881, the family moved to Manitoba, settling on a farm near Glendale. Sirett served as postmaster there, also serving on the municipal council and school board.

He died in Neepawa at the age of 75.
