= John Raber =

American politician

John Raber (March 2, 1823 – August 22, 1902) was a German-American businessman and politician from New York.

== Life ==
Raber was born on March 2, 1823, in the Kingdom of Prussia. He immigrated to America when he was 10, initially residing in New York City. He moved to Brooklyn in 1841. At one point, he settled in Williamsburg.

Raber initially worked as a clerk in the agricultural business. In 1850, he was engaged in wire cloth and sieve manufacturing. In 1857, he was involved in the flour and feed trade. He was later involved in the grocery business.

In 1866, Raber was elected to the New York State Assembly as a Democrat, representing the Kings County 6th District. He served in the Assembly in 1867. He ran again for the seat that year, but his opponent Jacob Worth was declared the winner. Raber was then awarded and was seated in the Assembly in 1868 on March 13. In 1874, he was appointed charity commissioner.

Raber had three sons and three daughters. One of his sons, Rev. John Raber, was a Roman Catholic priest.

Raber died at home of pneumonia on August 22, 1902. He was buried in Holy Trinity Cemetery.

New York State Assembly
Preceded by Ira Buckman Jr.	New York State Assembly; Kings County, 6th District; 1867	Succeeded by Jacob Worth
Preceded by Jacob Worth	New York State Assembly; Kings County, 6th District; 1868	Succeeded by Andrew B. Hodges
