= Patrons of Industry in Manitoba =

The Patrons of Industry in Manitoba was an extension of the Patrons of Industry farmers' organization which operated in Ontario and the United States during the 1880s and 1890s. The Patrons lobbied extensively and were politically active, running provincial and federal candidates.

The Manitoba Patrons, as a fraternal organization, was initially focused on coordinating an agrarian cooperative movement on the Prairies.

Its first lodges in Manitoba and the Northwest Territories began in 1890, with a "grand lodge" (central body) established in 1891. At first the group was known as the "Patrons of Manitoba and the North-West" - its conventions included delegates from Manitoba and the territorial districts of Assiniboia, Saskatchewan and Alberta. The organization's leader was Charles Braithwaite, who was chosen at a convention held in November 1891.

Through direct bulk buying in competition with established stores, the movement brought down the price of farm supplies (binder twine) and other farmers' needs, and through strong lobbying it helped achieve a cut in tariffs on imported goods important to farmers.

The Manitoba group turned to direct political action in 1894. Following a tour of Manitoba by Braithwaite (who was a spellbinding orator), the Patrons nominated candidates in all but two of the province's constituencies, in anticipation of the next provincial election.

The Patrons were the first "third party" to emerge in Manitoba after partisan government was formally introduced to the province in 1888. They opposed both Conservatives and Liberals and were for a time affiliated with Dalton McCarthy, a dissident federal Conservative.

On August 23, 1894, the Patrons proved they were a significant force in Manitoba politics when their candidate John Forsyth defeated Conservative leader John Andrew Davidson in a two-sided Beautiful Plains by-election (there was no Liberal candidate in the race). Forsyth was expelled from the Patrons in 1895 for using a railway pass (given free to legislators) in violation of party policy.

Patrons of Industry made an appearance in the 1894 NWT Assembly election, running J.E. Annable in the Moose Jaw district - unsuccessfully.

The party became internally divided over the Manitoba Schools Question. Many Catholic Patrons were alienated by the party's support of Liberal Premier Thomas Greenway's efforts to eliminate denominational schools, and left the party.

The Patrons ran seven candidates in the provincial election of 1896, and two of them were elected: Watson Crosby in Dennis and William Sirett in Beautiful Plains.

The Patrons ran candidates in two Manitoba provincial by-elections in 1896 who were not successful. (On the other hand, Matt McCauley was elected with official Patron backing in Edmonton (Alberta) in the 1896 North-West Assembly election.)

Three Manitoba Patrons -- Postlethwaite (Brandon), Braithwaite (Macdonald), and Marshall (Marquette) -- ran in the 1896 federal election, but were unsuccessful, finishing third in their ridings.

Braithwaite, who had led the Manitoba Patrons of Industry party since 1891, stepped down as party leader in January 1897, and the party effectively ceased to exist after this time. PI MLA Crosby died in 1897, and PI MLA Sirett did not run for re-election in 1899.

In addition to supporting agrarian interests, the Patrons also supported prohibition, universal suffrage (for men and women) and electoral reform. These policies would later re-emerge in the platform of the Progressive Party of Canada and other farmer political parties such as the United Farmers of Manitoba and the United Farmers of Alberta.

== See also ==
- List of Manitoba political parties
