= William Fraser (Canadian politician) =

Canadian politician

William Fraser (June 17, 1832, in Red River Colony, Ruperts Land – September 9, 1909 in Fraser's Grove, Manitoba, Canada) was a farmer, bureaucrat, and politician from Manitoba, Canada.

Fraser began his political experience as a Member of the Council of Assiniboia serving from 1868 until 1870.

He was appointed to serve on the Temporary North-West Council on December 28, 1872. The council was the first governing body in Northwest Territories' history. He served that post until 1876. Fraser was one of the only men appointed who did not have a seat in the Manitoba Legislature.

The neighborhood of Fraser's Grove in Winnipeg is named after him.
