= Treaty Road =

Canadian television documentary series

Treaty Road is a Canadian documentary television series, premiering March 5, 2024 on APTN and later streamed on CBC Gem. Hosted by Erin Goodpipe and Saxon de Cocq, the series travels across Canada to profile the history of the Numbered Treaties under which much of Canada's land was surrendered from indigenous to government ownership, and their ongoing impact on indigenous Canadian peoples.

The series has its genesis in de Cocq's discovery that he is a direct descendant of James McKay, a Métis fur trader and politician who was a key figure in the treaty negotiations.

Production on the series was first announced in 2023.

Funding for a second season was announced in June 2024.

== Release ==
The series premiered on APTN on March 5, 2024. In June 2026, Treaty Road was made available on CBC Gem as part of CBC's National Indigenous History Month programming lineup.

== Episodes ==
=== Season 1 (2024) ===
| No. overall | No. in season | Title | Directed by | Written by | Original release date |
|---|---|---|---|---|---|
| 1 | 1 | "Surrender the Land" | Candy Fox | Berkley Brady, Saxon DeCocq | March 5, 2024 |
The first episode of Season 1 takes hosts Erin Goodpipe and Saxon de Cocq to Treaty 1 territory in Manitoba. They learn about the importance of the term “surrender” which was included in the text of the numbered treaties, but not overtly discussed with the Indigenous leaders who were part of the negotiations. Saxon’s ancestor James Mckay is the inspiration for this journey and exploration of what the Treaties were and the state they are in today. He is a key figure in these early negotiations, but it is unclear what his motivations and intentions were in participating. Saxon wants to know more.
| 2 | 2 | "Justice" | Candy Fox | Berkley Brady, Saxon DeCocq | March 12, 2024 |
Erin and Saxon’s journey continues as they travel to Treaty 2 territory and Riding Mountain National Park in Manitoba. Here they learn about how Indigenous people were removed from their homeland to facilitate the creation of this park (and so many others). It makes Saxon rethink how he has enjoyed these natural preserves in the past and will not ever be able to do so again in the same way. Saxon and Erin also learn about the complicated history of Indigenous people and law of Canada and how justice has often been far out of reach because it offered them no real protection. They were restrained by its rules and regulations, but were not allowed to access the mechanisms that would allow them to fight for themselves.
| 3 | 3 | "Water" | Candy Fox | Berkley Brady, Saxon DeCocq | March 19, 2024 |
The third episode of the season takes Erin and Saxon into Treaty 3 territory which covers parts of Ontario and Manitoba. They go on a deep exploration into the importance of water for the Indigenous peoples in this area, how colonization has been responsible for the contamination of this important resource, and how this has impacted the health and safety of those in the region. This introduction to the concept of environmental racism is made personal through the stories of those they speak to. They visit the Grassy Narrows road blockade and learn more the ongoing struggle to protect the water and land.
| 4 | 4 | "Education" | Candy Fox | Berkley Brady, Saxon DeCocq | March 26, 2024 |
This episode is a homecoming as Erin returns to her home territory of Treaty 4 in Saskatchewan. During the shooting of this episode she also gives birth to her first child, which brings both an immediacy and long term perspective as she thinks about both the past and her baby’s future. She and Saxon visit the site of one of the schools in the Canadian Indian residential school system and face the terrible legacy of these institutions. They learn about the push to honour the memory of children's lives that were lost during this dark time in the all too recent history of Canada.
| 5 | 5 | "Food Sovereignty" | Candy Fox | Berkley Brady, Saxon DeCocq | April 2, 2024 |
Erin and Saxon travel to Treaty 5 territory which includes parts of northern Manitoba, Saskatchewan and Ontario. While there they explore the issue of food sovereignty and how the treaties and settler encroachment took away the ability of the Indigenous peoples to sustain themselves from the bounty of the land upon which they lived. They also learn about how this issue is being addressed in the present as innovative gardeners in Norway House Cree Nation provide greens year-round. Saxon and Erin also engage in land-based education where they go ice fishing and Saxon learns a special lesson or two.
| 6 | 6 | "Resistance" | Candy Fox | Berkley Brady, Saxon DeCocq | April 9, 2024 |
In the final episode of the first season Erin and Saxon delve into Treaty 6 which covers much of central Alberta and Saskatchewan. At the time of the negotiation and signing of this treaty, the buffalo herds were nearing extinction which had huge negative impact on the health and safety of the plains people as they struggled to survive. Because of this a medicine chest clause is added to this treaty to protect health. However, at the same time the Indian Act was passed, undermining any rights enshrined in treaties. The loyalties and motivations of James McKay also become more clear in this episode.
