= Walter Robert Bown =

Canadian politician

Walter Robert Bown (January 27, 1828 – March 8, 1903) was a man of many vocations. He was a dentist, businessman, journalist, publisher, politician, and office holder.

Bown was a member of the Temporary North-West Council which was formed in 1870 with the creation of Northwest Territories, Canada and was dissolved in 1876. He served from the fall of 1873 until dissolution. His involvements surrounding the Red River Colony, Louis Riel and the politics and journalism of the time made him an important figure in that history.
