= François Dauphinais =

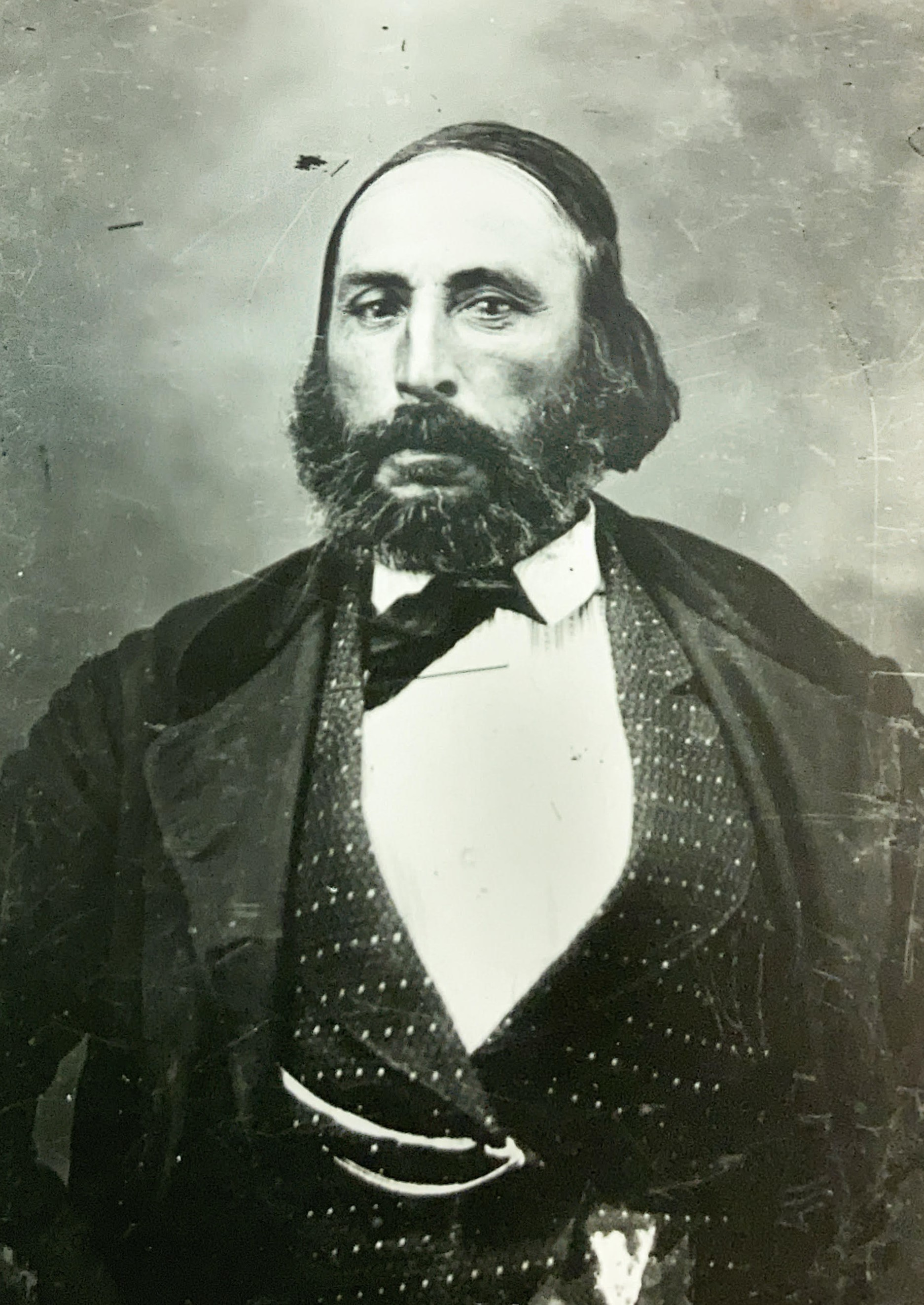

François Genthon dit Dauphinais (January 1, 1815 – February 15, 1889) was a political figure in Manitoba of Métis descent. He served as a member of the Provisional Government of Assiniboia and was a member of the Legislative Council of Manitoba from 1871 to 1876.

The son of Michel Genthon dit Dauphinais and Victorie Ouellette, he represented St. François Xavier at the 1869 convention and served as vice-president of the Provisional Government under Louis Riel. He was arrested by Garnet Wolseley's troops in 1870.

Dauphinais was married twice: first to Françoise Paul and then, in 1882, to Marguerite Morin.

He died in St. John, North Dakota, at the age of 74.
