= Thomas Sinclair Jr. =

Thomas Sinclair (April 9, 1841 – March 8, 1888) was a farmer and political figure in Manitoba. He served in the Legislative Assembly of Assiniboia.

He was born in the Red River Settlement, Rupert's Land, the son of Thomas Sinclair and Hannah Cummings. Sinclair married Alice Matilda Davis.

He died in Selkirk at the age of 46.
