= John Gunion Rutherford =

Canadian politician (1857–1923)

John Gunion Rutherford CMG
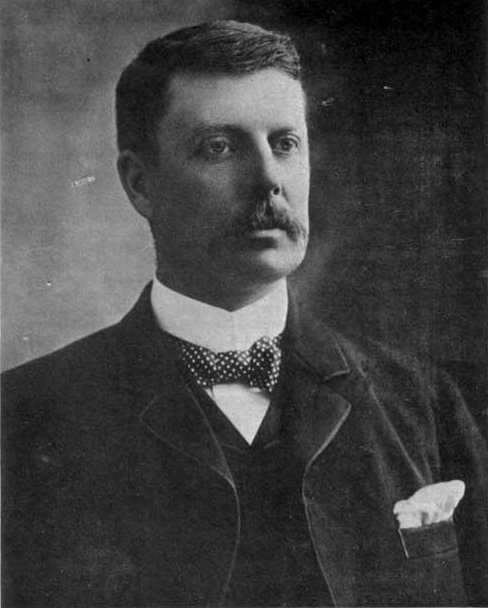

Member of the Canadian Parliament for Macdonald
- In office 1897–1900
- Preceded by: Nathaniel Boyd
- Succeeded by: Nathaniel Boyd

Personal details
- Born: 25 December 1857 Mountain Cross, Newlands Parish, Peeblesshire, Scotland
- Died: 24 July 1923 (aged 65) Ottawa, Ontario, Canada
- Party: Liberal

John Gunion Rutherford CMG (25 December 1857 – 24 July 1923) was a Canadian veterinarian, civil servant, and politician.

Born in Mountain Cross, Newlands Parish, Peeblesshire, Scotland, the son of Rev. Robert Rutherford, Rutherford was educated at the High School in Glasgow and by private tuition. He emigrated to Canada in 1875 and took a course at the Ontario Agricultural College and afterwards attended the Ontario Veterinary College, graduating in 1879 with the rank of gold medalist. Settling in Portage la Prairie, Manitoba, he was President of the Manitoba Liberal Printing Company and the owner of a large veterinary infirmary. During the North-West Rebellion in 1885, Rutherford served with the Winnipeg Field Battery as a Veterinary Surgeon, and was present at the engagements of Fish Creek and Batoche, for which he received the medal and clasp.

In 1892, he was elected to the Legislative Assembly of Manitoba for the electoral district of Lakeside. A Manitoba Liberal, he served until 1896. He was elected to the House of Commons of Canada in an 1897 by-election for the electoral district of Macdonald. A Liberal, he was defeated in 1900. He was appointed Dominion Veterinary Director-General in 1902 and Dominion Livestock Commissioner in 1906. In 1912, he was appointed Superintendent of Agriculture and Animal Industry for the Canadian Pacific Railway.

He was president of the American Veterinary Medical Association from 1908 to 1909. From 1918 until his death in 1923, he was a Board of Railway Commissioner and Transport Commissioner.

He was appointed CMG in the 1910 Birthday Honours.
