= Hugh O'Lone =

Hugh Francis "Bob" O'Lone (c. 1836 – early January 1871) was an American-born saloon keeper and political figure in Manitoba. He was a member of the Convention of Forty and served in the Legislative Assembly of Assiniboia. His last name also appears as Olone.

He was born in New York City, the son of Margaret O'Lone. In 1863, he joined the 170th New York Infantry. O'Lone took part in the defense of Washington during the American Civil War. His regiment later became part of the Army of the Potomac. He was wounded at Petersburg, Virginia and was discharged in January 1865 as captain of Company F. With two partners, O'Lone came to Portage la Prairie later that year. He moved to Winnipeg after one of his partners was killed in a fight. O'Lone was later killed by a blow to the head with a revolver. It is believed that he was one of several persons killed by Canadian troops in retaliation for the execution of Thomas Scott.
