= James McKay (fur trader) =

Canadian trader & politician (1828–1879)

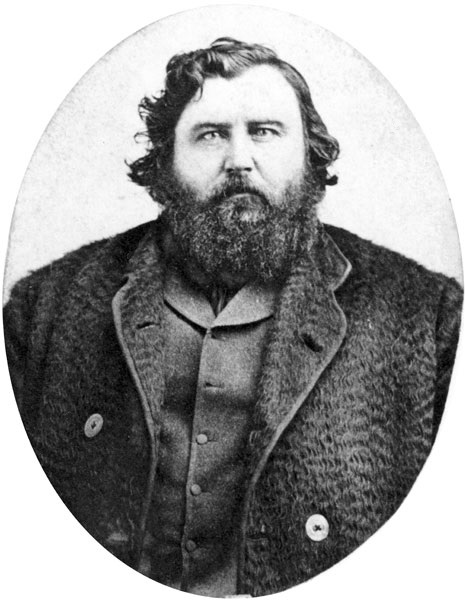
- James McKay in the 1870s
- Born: 1828; Fort Edmonton, current-day Alberta
- Died: December 2, 1879 (aged 50–51); Winnipeg, Manitoba
- Employer: Hudson's Bay Company
- Relatives: Angus McKay (brother)

James McKay (1828 – December 2, 1879) was a fur trader, pioneer, and pre-Canadian confederation politician and interpreter.

== Early life ==
James McKay was born in 1828 at the Hudson's Bay Company's Edmonton House, the son of James Charles (b. 1797, Scotland) and Marguerite Gladu (b. 1809, Métis, Cumberland House). He was a brother to Angus McKay.

McKay was educated at the Red River Colony and began work with the HBC in 1853 as a fur-trader and guide/interpreter. Many distinguished visitors sought him out as a guide; he often met the HBC governor, George Simpson in Crow Wing, Minnesota, and escorted him to Upper Fort Garry. In 1857, while at Fort Ellice, he was engaged to guide the John Palliser party from Fort Ellice (St Lazare, MB) through the Saskatchewan plains to its winter quarters at Fort Carlton, Saskatchewan.

McKay married in 1859 and left the HBC in 1860, going into business for himself. He established his home west of the Forks in present-day Manitoba and quickly became involved in this community. He was made a member of the Council of Assiniboia in 1868, and caught up in the hostilities in the Red River Colony between 1869 and 1870. Because of his Métis heritage, he chose to leave the community for a short time. On his return, he was made a member of the provisional government. James' brother, Angus McKay, was active in the political unrest of the time.

== Political career ==
=== Indian Treaty negotiations ===
McKay made important contributions in the settlement of Indian land claims. In 1871, he was part of the negotiation of Treaty 1 (Lower Fort Garry) and Treaty 2 (Manitoba Post on Lake Manitoba). He continued with Treaty 3 (North West Angle of Lake of the Woods) in 1873. In 1875, he was a commissioner for Treaty 5, which was negotiated at Winnipeg. He was also the Indian commissioner for Treaty 6, which was signed at Fort Carlton and Fort Pitt in 1876.

=== Northwest Territories Council ===
James McKay was appointed as a member of the Temporary North-West Council along with Pierre Delorme and Joseph Royal in 1873. These appointments were made in response to demand by the Métis, who wanted representation in the government. While he was on the council, he worked on dealing with problems affecting the native population. His skills, both as a negotiator and interpreter, made his input instrumental in a number of Treaty negotiations.

=== Province of Manitoba ===
After the establishment of Manitoba as a province, McKay was appointed to the Legislative Council of Manitoba, serving as its speaker until 1874. After the Council was abolished in 1876, he was elected by acclamation to the Legislative Assembly of Manitoba for the district of Lake Manitoba. McKay served as Minister of Agriculture from 1875 to 1878, when he resigned due to poor health. He was considered to have excellent judgment; but influenced strongly by the views of the Archbishop Alexandre-Antonin Taché.

== Legacy ==
Treaty Road, a 2024 documentary series about the history of the Numbered Treaties, was hosted by Saxon de Cocq, a direct descendant of McKay's.
