= Jacob Worth =

American politician

Jacob Worth (May 1, 1838 – February 21, 1905) was an American politician from New York.

== Life ==
He was born on May 1, 1838, in New York City. The family removed to Williamsburgh in 1842. His father died a short time later, leaving a widow and five children in straitened circumstances. He began to work aged eight years in a ropewalk. At age 14, he became a teamster on the Erie Canal, then a boatman on the Hudson River, and aged 16 joined the U.S. Navy as an apprentice, and made a voyage around the world which lasted three years. After his return to Brooklyn he worked as a rigger.

At age 19, he entered politics as a Democrat, but in 1861 became a Republican. In September 1862, he was commissioned a first lieutenant in the 139th New York Volunteers, and early in 1863 a captain in the 84th New York Volunteers, and fought in the Peninsular Campaign until the latter part of 1863.

Worth was a member of the New York State Assembly (Kings Co., 7th D.) in 1864, 1865 and 1866. In November 1866, he ran for Brooklyn Street Commissioner, but was defeated. He was again declared elected to the 91st New York State Legislature (Kings Co., 6th D.), and took his seat at the beginning of the session, but his election was contested by Democrat John Raber who was seated on March 13, 1868.

He was again a member of the State Assembly (Kings Co., 6th D.) in 1873, 1874, 1875, 1876 and 1878. In November 1878, he ran for Sheriff of Kings County, but was defeated. He was a Commissioner of City Works of Brooklyn from 1879 to 1880, and was appointed Brooklyn Fire Commissioner in June 1880 to February 1882. In 1884, he ran unsuccessfully for Congress.

He was a member of the New York State Senate (4th D.) from 1886 to 1889, sitting in the 109th, 110th, 111th and 112th New York State Legislatures.

In 1897, he was appointed Clerk of Kings County, to fill a vacancy. The same year he supported Seth Low at the first mayoral election of the consolidated City of New York, against the regular Republican candidate Benjamin F. Tracy, and fell in disgrace with the Republican party machine.

Worth suffered from poor health after 1898, and during his last years spent the winters in Hot Springs, Arkansas. On February 21, 1905, a short time after returning from the Oaklawn Park Race Track, he died suddenly in his room at the Eastman Hotel in Hot Springs, "supposedly of heart failure."

New York State Assembly
Preceded by Charles P. Leslie	New York State Assembly; Kings County, 7th District; 1864–1866	Succeeded by Henry M. Dixon
Preceded by John Raber	New York State Assembly; Kings County, 6th District; 1868	Succeeded by John Raber
Preceded by Peter G. Peck	New York State Assembly; Kings County, 6th District; 1873–1876	Succeeded by John A. Dillmeier
Preceded by John A. Dillmeier	New York State Assembly; Kings County, 6th District; 1878	Succeeded by Lewis R. Stegman
New York State Senate
Preceded by John C. Jacobs	New York State Senate; 4th District; 1884–1889	Succeeded by Patrick H. McCarren

Preceded by Phillip F. Brennan	Commissioner of the Brooklyn Fire Department; June 1880–February 1882	Succeeded by John Nelson Partridge

== Sources ==
- The New York Red Book compiled by Edgar L. Murlin (published by James B. Lyon, Albany NY, 1897; pg. 403, 487–490, 494–498 and 783)
- Life Sketches of Government Officers and Members of the Legislature of the State of New York in 1875 by W. H. McElroy and Alexander McBride (pg. 319ff)
- Biographical sketches of the members of the Legislature in The Evening Journal Almanac (1887)
