= Jean-Baptiste Beauchemin =

Canadian politician

Jean-Baptiste Beauchemin (November 3, 1838 – December 2, 1900) was a political figure in Manitoba who served in the Legislative Assembly of Assiniboia.

He was born in St. Boniface, Red River Settlement, the son of Benjamin Beauchemin and Marie Parenteau. Beauchemin married Marguerite McMillan around 1860. He died at St. Charles at the age of 62.

His uncle André Beauchemin also served in the Legislative Assembly.
