= Richard H. Poillon =

Brooklyn Fire Commissioner
- In office 1884–1886
- Mayor: Seth Low; Daniel D. Whitney
- Preceded by: John Nelson Partridge
- Succeeded by: John Ennis

Deputy Brooklyn Fire Commissioner
- In office 1882–1884
- Mayor: Seth Low
- Commissioner: John Nelson Partridge

Deputy Collector of U.S. Revenue for New York
- In office 1880–1882
- President: Rutherford B. Hayes; James A. Garfield

Personal details
- Died: 1 August 1925 (age 79) New York City
- Parent: Richard Poillon (father)
- Education: United States Military Academy
- Occupation: military officer, businessman, civil servant

Military service
- Allegiance: United States
- Branch/service: United States Army (1871–1874); New York Militia (1879–1886)
- Rank: Second Lieutenant (U.S. Army); Major (NY Militia)

Richard H. Poillon was an American military officer, businessman, and civil servant. The son of prominent Brooklyn shipbuilder Richard Poillon (of the firm C. & R. Poillon), he was a 1871 graduate of the United States Military Academy. He served United States Army from 1871 until 1874 and the New York Militia from 1879 until 1886.

Poillon served as the Deputy Collector of U.S. Revenue (federal tax collector) for New York from 1880–82. He served as Deputy Commissioner of the Brooklyn Fire Department from 1882 to 84, and as Commissioner from 1884 to 1886.

In the private sector, Poillon worked from 1874 to 1880 as a merchant in lumber sales. In 1888, he entered the insurance business.

== Early life ==
Poillon was the son of shipbuilder Richard Poillon of the firm C. & R. Poillon.

== Military career ==
Poillon graduated from the United States Military Academy (West Point) in the class of 1871. He attended the academy from 1 July 1867 to 12 June 1871. Upon his graduation, he was promoted to Second Lieutenant in the 23rd Infantry. He served in garrison at the Presidio of San Francisco in San Francisco, California until April 1872. He next served on Angel Island, California until 11 May 1872. He next served at Camp Lowell in Arizona until 25 January 1873. He next served on special duty at Fort Yuma in California until March 1873. He next served again at Camp Lowell until 10 April 1874, and took a leave of absence thereafter until resigning from the military on 1 August 1874.

Poillon was a major in the 23rd Regiment of Brooklyn in the New York Militia from 1879–86.

As a veteran, Poillon was a member of the Old Guard.

== Business career ==
From 1874 to 1880, Poillon worked as a merchant in lumber sales in Brooklyn, New York. He worked in insurance in Brooklyn beginning in 1886.

== Deputy Collector of U.S. Revenue for New York ==
In 1880, he was appointed Deputy Collector of U.S. Revenue (tax collector) for New York. He served until 1882.

== Brooklyn Fire Department ==
From 1882 to 1884, Poillon served as Deputy Commissioner of the Brooklyn Fire Department under John Nelson Partridge. During the Brooklyn mayoralty of Seth Low, he was promoted to Fire Commissioner, serving from 1884 to 1886. He was succeeded in office by John Ennis.

== Family ==
In 1928, Poillon's daughter, Julia, married John T. Lynch (a 1920 graduate of the United States Military Academy). In 1929, they had a daughter who they named Jacqueline. On 15 January 1935, they had a son who they named Richard T. Lynch. This grandson followed in the footsteps of both Poillon and John T. Lynch and also attended the United States Military Academy, graduating in the class of 1958.

== Death ==
Poillon died 1 August 1925 at the age of 79 at his residence in New York City.
