= John Harrison O'Donnell =

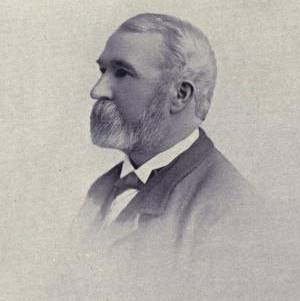

Member of the Legislative Council of Manitoba
- In office 1871–1876

Personal details
- Born: April 7, 1838 Simcoe, Ontario
- Died: October 26, 1912 (aged 74) Winnipeg, Manitoba

John Harrison O'Donnell (April 7, 1838 – October 26, 1912) was a physician and political figure in Manitoba. He was a member of the Legislative Council of Manitoba from 1871 to 1876 and served as its speaker in 1875.

He was born in Simcoe, Upper Canada, the son of John O'Donnell, a native of Ireland, and was educated at Victoria University and Trinity Medical College. In 1861, he married Hannah Routledge. He practised in St. Catharines, Ontario and Montreal before coming to Manitoba during the Red River Rebellion of 1869. While helping defend John Christian Schultz's property, O'Donnell was taken prisoner. He was a justice of the peace and made out the arrest warrant for Louis Riel when the Wolseley Expedition arrived in 1870. He was the first president of the Provincial Medical Health Board of Manitoba. O'Donnell served as provincial coroner and helped found the Winnipeg General Hospital. He was a professor of sanitary science at the Medical College of the University of Manitoba and served on the council for the university.

He wrote Manitoba as I saw it, from 1869 to date; with flashlights on the First Riel Rebellion, published in 1909.

He died in Winnipeg at the age of 74.
