= Robert Cunningham (politician) =

Canadian politician

Robert Cunningham (May 12, 1836 – July 4, 1874) was a Scottish-born Canadian journalist and politician. He served as a Liberal Member of Parliament for Marquette in Manitoba.

== Early life, education, and journalism career ==
Cunningham was born in Stewarton, Scotland. He studied at Glasgow College and the University of London. Cunningham moved to Toronto, Canada in 1868 where he began work as a journalist. Cunningham served as a correspondent, covering the Red River Rebellion for the Toronto Globe and Toronto Telegraph.

Cunningham chose to stay in the Manitoba, then a new province, and co-founded his own newspaper, The Manitoban. Cunningham and the newspaper were strong supporters of Liberal causes. He formed close relationships with Métis and francophone community leaders notably Joseph Dubuc and Louis Riel.

== Political career ==
Cunningham's political allies urged him to run for Parliament in the 1872 federal election. Cunningham was elected as a Liberal in the Marquette riding, defeating future Premier of Manitoba John Norquay.

While in Parliament, Cunningham was a strong supporter of the Métis community. He supported a general amnesty for those involved in the Red River Rebellion as well as land reforms for Métis. Cunningham acted independently of his party in other matters as well. Prime Minister John A. Macdonald noticed Cunningham's independent record and asked him to join the government caucus in 1873. Cunningham however stayed a Liberal and was re-elected in the following general election in 1874.

== Death ==
Cunningham was appointed as a member of the interim executive of the North-West Territories but died in Minnesota, while en route to take up his new position. Following his death, Cunningham's opponent from the general election, Liberal Joseph Ryan, was declared to be the MP for the riding upon review. Ryan only narrowly defeated the deceased Cunningham in a subsequent by-election.

Parliament of Canada
Preceded by James S. Lynch, Liberal	Member of Parliament from Marquette; 1872–1874	Succeeded by Joseph O'Connell Ryan, Liberal
