= Temporary North-West Council =

Canadian government council (1870–1876)

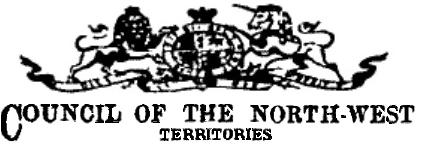

Type
- Type: Unicameral

History
- Established: 1870
- Disbanded: 1876
- Succeeded by: 1st Council of the North-West Territories

Leadership
- Lieutenant Governor: Alexander Morris since 1872
- Seats: 15

Elections
- Last election: Members chosen by appointment

Meeting place
- Fort Garry, Manitoba

The Temporary North-West Council, more formally known as the Council of the North-West Territories and by its short name as the North-West Council, lasted from the creation of North-West Territories, Canada, in 1870 until it was dissolved in 1876. The council was mostly made up of members of the Manitoba Legislative Assembly and members of the Parliament of Canada who were appointed to serve on the council.

No members appointed were allowed to sit on the council until December 28, 1872. The council ran the territories under the Temporary Government of Rupert's Land Act and the Manitoba Act. The council's mandate was renewed every year by the federal government until it was dissolved in 1876, to make way for the 1st Council of the North-West Territories.

== Early history ==
The territory formally known as Rupert's Land and the North-Western Territory were sold to the Government of Canada by the Hudson's Bay Company on November 19, 1869. The two territories were amalgamated to form the North-West Territories. The creation of a government for the territories was delayed by Louis Riel, who led the Red River Rebellion, ultimately leading to the creation of the province of Manitoba.

The North-West Territories joined Confederation along with Manitoba on July 15, 1870. Despite the provisions in law for setting up a council under the Temporary Government Act, 1870, the first council appointments by the Governor General were not made until November 28, 1872. The first attempt at creating the council came with the appointment of Francis Godschall Johnson by Lieutenant Governor Adams George Archibald on October 21, 1870. Johnson lost his appointment when it was overturned by the federal government, which ruled that Archibald had exceeded his powers in creating the council.

The first session of the council began on March 8, 1873. The session was short, sitting only two days. The Lieutenant Governor of the territory acted as Speaker, presiding over the council. All acts of the council had to be sent to Ottawa for approval by the Governor General.

The council had a poor relationship with the press of the day. Appointments to the council after 1872 were generally made in secret without official notification in some places, and major publications were forbidden from covering early council proceedings. The council met for meetings while it was in session at Early Government House in Fort Garry.

== Council members ==
Members by date	1870		1872	1873		1874			1876
Members by date	Oct. 21	Unknown	Nov. 28	Unknown	Oct. 30	Unknown	Mar. 26	Jul. 7	Nov. 7
Andrew Bannatyne									
Alfred Boyd									
Walter Robert Bown									
Pascal Breland									
William J. Christie									
Henry Clarke									
Robert Cunningham									
Pierre Delorme									
Joseph Dubuc									
William Fraser									
Marc-Amable Girard									
Robert Hamilton									
Francis Johnson									
William Kennedy									
James McKay									
John McTavish									
Joseph Royal									
John Schultz									
Donald Smith									
William Tait									
Vacancies	14	15	4	1	0	6	3	4	

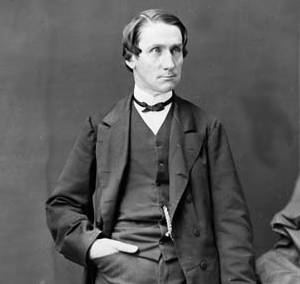
Lieutenant Governor Alexander Morris set up the council and appointed the members in 1872 and 1873.

The Temporary North-West Council existed in law for a total of six years. An attempt was made to set up the council and appoint the first member by Lieutenant Governor Archibald on October 21, 1870. The federal government told Archibald that he overstepped his bounds and the appointment of Johnson was revoked days later. After the council was officially set up there were two main sets of appointments made, both by Lieutenant Governor Alexander Morris.

The first batch of appointments came on December 28, 1872. That date Morris would appoint a total of eleven members to the council. This was the single biggest number of appointments in the history of the Northwest Territories Legislative Assembly.

Less than a full calendar year later and despite only being allowed up to fifteen seats, appointments to the council exceeded that limit during the second round in October 1873. All but two members of the Council held on to their seat until it was dissolved in 1876. William J. Christie resigned his seat in 1873 and Robert Cunningham was the only member of the council to die in office on July 4, 1874. In addition to the death of Cunningham, the first secretary of the North-West Council William T. Urquhart died at his home on September 24, 1874.

== Legislation ==
Over the course of three legislative sessions the council adopted legislation that formed the basis of North-West Territories law. The legislation covered a wide variety of issues. The measures related to law and justice included customs duties, prohibition on liquor along with the establishment of a police force, the establishment of the stipendiary magistrate system.

The council was equally responsive in establishing social policy. Welfare programs for Indigenous populations was established. This included negotiating the first treaties to bring in the reserve system. Legislation regulating how masters treat their servants was also implemented.

In regards to infrastructure, the council passed regulations securing public rights-of-way including roads and waterways. Legislation was also implemented to send out survey parties to various parts of the territory. Resource management was also practised with the limitation of the buffalo hunt, and regulations on other hunts including banning poisons for use in hunting practices.

=== Prohibition ===
The most notable legislation the council produced came out of the second legislative session that began on March 11, 1874. The council banned the importation and manufacture of spirituous liquors and passed a motion to recommend the creation of the North-West Mounted Police (NWMP). The purpose behind the ban was to prevent settlers from trading alcohol to native populations, with the NWMP created to enforce the prohibition. The only liquor allowed in the territory was brought in with special permission by the lieutenant governor. The Cypress Hills massacre was the driving force for the council to implement prohibition and recommend a police force.

=== Indigenous people ===
The council implemented legislation to provide training programs and equipment to teach Indigenous people agricultural practices. This legislation included providing cattle and other livestock. Members of the council also proposed and negotiated the first treaties, creating the reserve system in Canada.

The council also set regulations in the final session to limit the buffalo hunt; this was a measure to address the sharp decline in the buffalo population. This was also a further measure to encourage Indigenous populations to adopt agricultural practices using programs that had been previously implemented by the government.

=== Justice ===
The council also proposed the appointment of stipendiary magistrates to the North-West Council to deal with most legal cases in the territory. Each appointed magistrate would take up residence in a certain area and be responsible for all legal cases. The magistrates were given the option of referring cases of an unusual nature to the Court of Queen's Bench of Manitoba. This became the prominent justice system of the territory until the Supreme Court of the North-West Territories was founded in 1887. This court system played a major role in the development and history of the 1st Council of the North-West Territories.

== The final session ==
The last session of the Temporary North-West council was called on November 23, 1875. The throne speech outlined the need for regulation of the buffalo hunt, and peaceful and orderly settlement to the territory, and highlighted past legislative achievements of the council. The last council session closed on December 14, 1875 and did not meet again until it was dissolved on November 7, 1876.
