= Earl Kiser =

American cyclist

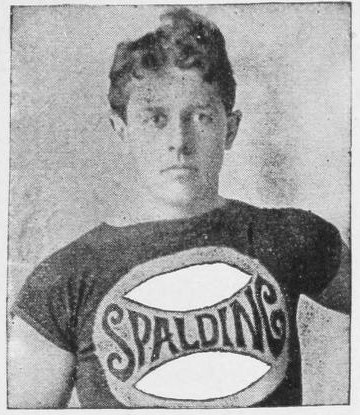
Earl Kiser. Photo from Spalding's Official Bicycle Guide for 1899.

Earl Herbert Kiser (1875 – 19 January 1936) was an American world class bicycle racer in the period around 1893–1904.

== Biography ==
Kiser was a member of the famous Stearns Yellow Fellow Team that toured the world and won a European championship in 1897. Like many cyclists he turned his interest to auto racing and was a star on the car racing circuit.

While practicing for a race on August 12, 1905 at the Cleveland, Ohio race track in Winton Bullet 2, Kiser's car suddenly turned toward the fence which resulted in the Winton crushing his left leg and dislocating his right shoulder. His crushed leg was amputated at Glenville Hospital the same day.

After recovering, he then turned his interest to developing the Miami Beach area.

Kiser was from Dayton, Ohio. Ohio governor James Middleton Cox, who knew him in the 1920s, wrote of him, "Possessing great muscular strength...he made his competitors look commonplace".
