= John McTavish (politician) =

Canadian politician

John Henry McTavish (June 11, 1837 – March 5, 1888) was an accountant and political figure in Manitoba. He represented Ste. Anne from 1871 to 1874 in the Legislative Assembly of Manitoba.

He was born in Grafton, Upper Canada and educated in Montreal, Province of Canada. He came to Fort Garry as an apprentice clerk for the Hudson's Bay Company in 1857. McTavish married Maria, the daughter of John Rowand in 1863. He was in charge of Upper Fort Garry after Governor William McTavish (not a relative) left for Scotland in 1870. In 1873, he was a founding member of the Winnipeg Board of Trade. McTavish was named to the Council for the North-West Territories in 1874 but retired from politics to serve as Chief Factor at Fort Garry from 1874 to 1880. In 1881, he became a land commissioner for the Canadian Pacific Railway.

McTavish died in Winnipeg, Manitoba at the age of 50 and was buried in Saint Boniface, Manitoba.
