= James S. Lynch =

Canadian politician (1841–1894)

James Spencer Lynch (1841 – July 22, 1894) was a Manitoba physician and political figure. He represented Marquette in the 1st Canadian Parliament from March 2, 1871 to July 8, 1872 as a Liberal member.

He was born near London in Canada West in 1841, studied at the University of Toronto and came to Manitoba in 1868. He was arrested by Louis Riel after he tried to organize a company of Canadian volunteers in Winnipeg. He practised medicine in Portage la Prairie for a time. Both Lynch and Angus McKay represented Marquette in the House of Commons, due to a tie vote in the by-election held after Manitoba joined Confederation. Lynch was defeated in the general election that followed in 1872. In 1876, he led the group dealing with a smallpox epidemic in Gimli. Lynch became a member of the Medical Board of Manitoba in 1877; he was reelected in 1882 and served as president of the Board. Lynch was one of the first attending physicians at the Winnipeg General Hospital. In 1886, the Board was replaced by Council of the College of Physicians and Surgeons of Manitoba and Lynch again served as president. He died in Winnipeg in 1894.
