= Pierre Poitras =

Canadian politician (1810–1889)

Pierre Poitras (1810 – July 31, 1889) was a political figure in Manitoba, Canada. He was a member of the Convention of Forty and served in the Legislative Assembly of Assiniboia.

The son of André Poitras and Marguerite Grant, he was born at Fort Esperance in the Qu’Appelle Valley. Poitras moved with his family to White Horse Plains four years later. In 1832, he married Marie Bruyere/Brillière. He was captured and seriously injured while scouting during the approach of the Red River Expeditionary Force. Poitras moved to Duhamel, Alberta sometime before 1885. He later died there at the age of 78.
