= Barentu =

Barentu may refer to:

- Barentu, Eritrea, a town
- Barento, one of the two major subgroups of the Oromo people
