= John Nelson Partridge =

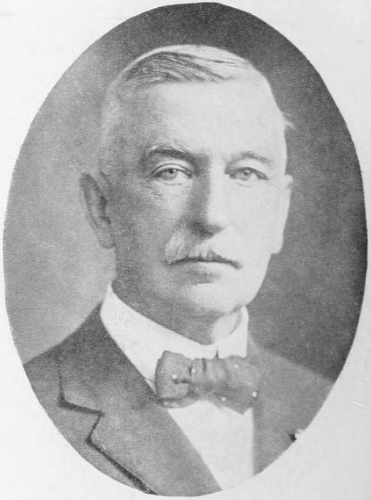

New York City Police Commissioner
- In office 1902–1903

Brooklyn Fire Commissioner
- In office 1882–1884
- Deputy: Richard H. Poillon
- Preceded by: Jacob Worth
- Succeeded by: Richard H. Poillon

Personal details
- Born: September 28, 1838; Leicester, Massachusetts, US
- Died: April 8, 1920 (aged 81); Westport, Connecticut, US
- Spouse: Charlotte Held (m. 1906)
- Occupation: Civil servant, railroad executive

John Nelson Partridge (September 28, 1838 – April 8, 1920) was the Police Commissioner for Brooklyn and Fire Commissioner for Brooklyn in the 1880s before the merger into New York City. He was the New York Superintendent of Public Works, and the New York City Police Commissioner from 1902 to 1903.

== Early life ==
John Nelson Partridge was born in Leicester, Massachusetts on September 28, 1838.

== Career ==
In 1882, he was appointed Commissioner of the Brooklyn Fire Department, succeeding Jacob Worth in the office. He left the office in 1884, and was succeeded by Richard H. Poillon. who had served as his deputy.

From 1886 to 1887 he was president of the Brooklyn City and Newtown Railroad.

Partidge was the New York City Police Commissioner from 1902 to 1903. During his tenure he wanted to move the New York City police headquarters from Mulberry Street to Times Square.

== Personal life ==
Patridge was widowed by his first wife, with whom he had a son who lived to adulthood. In 1906 Patridge re-married to Charlotte Held. They then moved to Westport, Connecticut. He died there on April 8, 1920.

== Literature ==
- Whalen, Bernard; Whalen, Jon (January 15, 2015). The NYPD's First 50 Years: Politicians, Police Commissioners, and Patrolmen. Potomac Books, Inc. pp. 19–32. ISBN 9781612346564.

Police appointments
Preceded by Michael C. Murphy	NYPD Commissioner; 1902–1903	Succeeded by Francis V. Greene
