= William Bernard O'Donoghue =

Irish-American treasurer

W.B. O'Donoghue in 1870

William Bernard O'Donoghue (1843 – 16 March 1878) was an Irish-American noted as having been the treasurer in the provisional government established by Louis Riel at the Red River Colony during the Red River Rebellion of 1869 – 1870. However, after fleeing to the United States with Riel on 24 August 1870, he subsequently broke with him following a meeting on 17 September where O'Donoghue unsuccessfully argued that the American government should be asked to intercede on behalf of the Métis people. O'Donoghue had by 1871 formed an association with the Fenian Brotherhood, and on 5 October of that year led a force of 35 men on a cross-border raid into Manitoba. The raid failed to attract the support of the Métis, and in fact, O'Donoghue was arrested by them and released to American authorities in Minnesota. Following the failed Fenian invasion of Manitoba, O'Donoghue was employed as a schoolteacher. He died of tuberculosis in St. Paul, Minnesota on 16 March 1878.
