= Craig Stewart (politician) =

Canadian politician

MP for Marquette
- In office 1968–1979
- Preceded by: Nick Mandziuk
- Succeeded by: riding dissolved

Personal details
- Born: April 4, 1928 Portage la Prairie, Manitoba
- Died: January 1, 2009 (aged 80)
- Party: Progressive Conservative
- Occupation: automobile dealer

Donald Craig Stewart (1928–2009) was a Canadian politician. He represented the electoral district of Marquette in the House of Commons from 1968 to 1979.

He was a member of the Progressive Conservative Party.

== Electoral record ==
1968 Canadian federal election: Marquette
Party	Candidate	Votes	%	±%
Progressive Conservative	Craig Stewart	12,706	48.62	
Liberal	Rod Clement	9,183	35.14	
New Democratic	Michael S. Antonation	3,651	13.97	
Independent	Walter Donovan	593	2.27	
Total valid votes		26,133	100.00	
Total rejected ballots		170		
Turnout		26,303	82.52	
Electors on the lists		31,875		
