= Francis Ogletree =

Canadian farmer and political figure

Francis Ogletree (April 4, 1826 – December 25, 1916) was a farmer and political figure in Manitoba, Canada. He served as a member of the Legislative Council of Manitoba from 1871 to 1876.

He was born in Connacht, Ireland, the son of Michael Ogletree and Annabella Scott, and came to Upper Canada with his family in 1830. Ogletree was educated in Brockville and came to Manitoba in 1869. He farmed at Portage la Prairie and also served as police magistrate and Indian agent for the area. Ogletree was married twice: first to Janet McLarty in 1848 and then, following her death, to his wife's sister Mary McLarty. In 1874, he served briefly in the province's Executive Council as a minister without portfolio.

Ogletree died at Portage la Prairie at the age of 90.
