= William Auld Tait =

Canadian politician and pioneer

William Auld Tait (c. 1826 – February 3, 1900) was a Canadian pioneer and politician. He served as a member of the Temporary North-West Council from March 26, 1874, to November 7, 1876.
