= Charles-Odilon Beauchemin =

Canadian printer and bookseller

Charles-Odilon Beauchemin (March 29, 1822 – November 1887) was a Montreal printer and bookseller.

Beauchemin studied at the Séminaire de Nicolet from 1836 until his father's death in 1841. Financially unable to remain in school, he spent some time in Montreal with printer John Lovell pursuing his interest in printing and bookbinding. He formed a business with his brother-in-law in 1864. The firm and partnership, Beauchemin et Valois, lasted 22 years. Valois retired and the firm Librairie C.-O. Beauchemin et fils was formed with Charles-Odilon and his son, Joseph-Odilon in partnership. The firm was successful and became more so after Charles died.

Charles-Odilon Beauchemin was an important figure in the growth of printing in Quebec. After his death in 1887, he was entombed at the Notre Dame des Neiges Cemetery in Montreal.
