= Charles Braithwaite =

Charles Braithwaite (c. 1850 – June 9, 1910) was a Manitoba politician and agrarian leader. From 1891 to 1897, he was the leader of the province's Patrons of Industry.

Braithwaite was born in Folston, England. A farmer's son with little formal education, he left England for Canada in the 1870s, initially living in Durham, Ontario, but moving to Manitoba in 1881. After shifting between cities and jobs for a few years, he settled as a farmer in Portage la Prairie in 1883.

In 1891, Braithwaite joined the Farmers' Institute, an educational and lobbying group representing the concerns of farmers. He also joined a Patrons of Industry local in the spring of the same year. A powerful orator, Braithwaite was elected Grand President of the Manitoba Patrons at their first provincial convention in November, and held this position until January 1897.

The Patrons of Industry were originally an agrarian fraternal organization and discussion forum operating throughout the United States and Canada. In Ontario and Manitoba, they followed in the tradition of earlier agrarian groups by opposing the national policy of John A. Macdonald's Conservative government. Under the national policy, Manitoba farmers were required to pay high prices for equipment while receiving relatively low prices for their goods. Braithwaite was able to lead a populist movement in opposition to this policy, using the slogan "Manitoba for Manitobans" to promote his organization's goals.

During Braithwaite's first three years as Patron leader, the organization focused on agrarian cooperation via the Patrons Commercial Union. This union failed due to poor management, after its members refused to contribute enough materials to attract commercial interests.

The Manitoba Patrons turned to direct political action in 1894. Originally a Liberal, Braithwaite encouraged the party to run its own candidates in provincial and federal elections to protest existing political corruption. Braithwaite himself conducted a successful tour of the province to spread this message. By the end of the year, membership in the Manitoba Patrons had grown to about 5000, and the party had nominated candidates in all but two constituencies in anticipation of the next provincial election. In the summer of 1894, Patron candidate John Forsyth defeated Conservative leader John Andrew Davidson in a by-election for the Manitoba legislature. (Forsyth subsequently violated party policy by using a railway pass as a privilege of elected office, and was expelled from the Patrons in October 1895).

The Patrons were, however, a divided organization. Braithwaite frequently quarrelled with Henry Clay, the hardline editor of the Patrons newspaper whose intemperate comments often drove financial supporters away from the party. Clay was replaced as editor in early 1895, but other divisions subsequently surfaced. (Clay recalled the event differently - according to him, he was with the paper until the end when he signed the printing press over to the print-shop employees to pay their wages owing.)

In early 1895, Braithwaite travelled to Toronto to help create the platform of a national Patrons party, which advocated agrarian reform, prohibition and woman's suffrage. Soon after this, however, the Manitoba Patrons became divided by a local issue, the Manitoba Schools Question. Catholic Patrons became alienated from the party when it supported the government of Thomas Greenway in opposing denominational schools. The controversy also caused many Protestant farmers to rally around Greenway's Liberals, further marginalizing the Patrons. Only seven Patrons candidates contested the 1896 provincial election in Manitoba, and of these only two were elected. Braithwaite had already declared himself a candidate for federal office, and did not run provincially.

In the 1896 federal election, Braithwaite contested the riding of Macdonald on a platform of non-sectarian schools, electoral reform, agricultural interests, free trade, public utilities ownership, prohibition and universal suffrage. His campaign was marginalized by a close national race between the Conservatives and Liberals, and was dealt a further blow when Charles Tupper's Conservatives unveiled a platform that promoted many of the Patrons goals. Braithwaite finished third in his riding, and stepped down as Grand President in January 1897. The Patrons effectively ceased to exist as a viable political group in Manitoba after this time, although many of their policies would later resurface in the Progressive Party of Canada.

Braithwaite lost his farm to fire and did not have the funds to re-build as he had been operating a farm beyond his ability anyway. Braithwaite, who had led the party since 1891, stepped down as party leader in January 1897, and the party effectively ceased to exist after this time.

He accepted office as Manitoba's provincial weed inspector, serving from 1897 to 1901. He returned to his farm after this, and in 1904 moved to Chilliwack, British Columbia. He later became the first postmaster of the small community of Camp Slough, and died in 1910.
