= Robert Watson (Canadian politician) =

Canadian politician

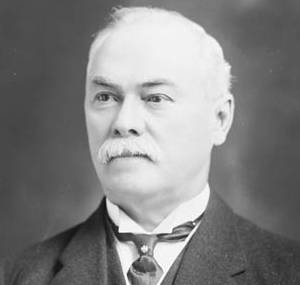
Robert Watson Source: Library and Archives Canada

Robert Watson (April 29, 1853 – May 19, 1929) was an industrialist and political figure in Manitoba, Canada. He represented Marquette in the House of Commons of Canada from 1883 to 1892 as a Liberal and Portage la Prairie in the Legislative Assembly of Manitoba as a Liberal from 1892 to 1899. Watson sat for Portage la Prairie division in the Senate of Canada from 1900 to 1929.

He was born in Elora, Canada West, the son of George Watson and Elizabeth McDonald, both natives of Scotland, and became a millwright there. In 1876, he moved to Manitoba and built mills at Portage la Prairie and Stonewall. In partnership with his brother, he operated a machine shop and planing mills. Watson was also president of the Manitoba and Saskatchewan Coal Company and the Central Electric Company. Watson married Isobel Brown in 1880. He served two years as a member of the town council for Portage la Prairie before entering federal politics. Watson resigned his seat in the House of Commons in 1892 to enter provincial politics. He served in the provincial cabinet as Minister of Public Works from 1892 to 1900. He died in office in Brandon at the age of 76.
