= André Beauchemin =

Canadian politician

André Beauchemin (November 6, 1824 – December 13, 1902) was a Métis politician in Manitoba, representing the community of St. Vital.

== Biography ==
André Beauchemin was born on November 6, 1824, at Red River, the son of André Millet dit Beauchemin and Madeleine Ducharme. His wife was Geneviève Delorme; the date of their marriage is not known. He farmed and also worked as a wheelwright.

He first represented the community of St. Vital on the Red River Council, convened by Métis leader Louis Riel in 1869, then joined the Convention of Forty as a delegate. When the convention formed Manitoba's provisional government in February 1870, he server as a councillor before being elected to the Legislative Assembly of Assiniboia as the representative for the St. Vital riding.

In November 1872, Beauchemin offered to resign his seat in the Manitoba assembly so that Riel could be elected in a by-election. Alexander Morris, at that time administrator for the province, warned that an arrest warrant for the murder of Thomas Scott would be issued if Riel attempted to contest a by-election. Beauchemin remained in his seat until 1874.
