= Pierre Parenteau =

Canadian politician

Pierre Parenteau (c. 1814 – after 1886) was a politician in Manitoba. He was a member of the Convention of Twenty-Four and Convention of Forty and served in the Legislative Assembly of Manitoba. He was also a member of Louis riels provisional government.

Biographical details about Parenteau are uncertain because his name was a common one in the area. It is believed by some sources that he is the same Pierre Parenteau who was convicted for his actions during the North-West Rebellion of 1885. Parenteau was sentenced to 7 years in the Manitoba penitentiary (Stony Mountain) and reportedly died shortly after his release.

It is also believed that Parenteau played an important role in organizing resistance in Manitoba against the Fenian raids.
