= Council of Assiniboia =

Type
- Type: Unicameral house

History
- Founded: 1821
- Disbanded: 1870
- Preceded by: none
- Succeeded by: Legislative Council of Manitoba

The Council of Assiniboia (French: Conseil d'Assiniboine) was the first appointed administrative body of the District of Assiniboia, operating from 1821 until 1870. It was this council who is credited for the arrival of a functioning legal system, a local police force, and a militia to the vast wilderness that was the fur-trading territory of Rupert's Land. Over its existence, the Council of Assiniboia transformed numerous times in an effort to bring law and order to a young colonial settlement that was rife with tension and hardship.

== History ==
The District of Assiniboia consisted of land that was in a 50-mile (80 km) radius around Upper Fort Garry, including the Red River Colony—which, until his death in 1820, was owned by Lord Selkirk. This council was created by the Hudson's Bay Company to govern the territory following its merger with the North West Company in 1821. The same year, the British Parliament also passed the Second Canada Jurisdiction Act 1821, which allowed the Governor of Lower Canada and the Crown to appoint justices of the peace in Rupert's Land in order to enact courts of record for the first time. As diverse as the Red River Colony was, so was its governing council. Both the Protestant and Roman Catholic clergy were represented on the council, and members had diverse ancestry including Scottish, Irish, Francophone, Métis, and Anglophone. However, the one commonality between all of the council members was their involvement with the Hudson's Bay Company; they either had been, or were still in service of the company. Being such an early stage of authority, it was not a form of responsible government; there were no elections, and all council members were appointed.

=== 1835 ===
Before 1835, the Council of Assiniboia consisted of a few councillors who assisted the governor, as well as some constables who had been nominally appointed. And so, according to H. Robert Baker, "this little machinery of government had dragged along under what has been very properly called the smoothing system, or rather no system at all." A smoothing system can be defined as a system that is built upon mediation outside of court, equitable settlements, and cooperation among those involved. This was a very flexible system, which was required during the early years of colonizing the west, as many of the colonizers had their own definitions of law that they brought with them, based on their own reason and equity. There was also no existence of any formal courts of law in the Red River Colony, as with the smoothing system in place, solutions outside of court were found.

The Council of Assiniboia's first evolution happened in 1835, a year after the Hudson's Bay Company was officially granted ownership of the District of Assiniboia from the Selkirk estate. The Red River Settlement was divided into four separate districts, with a respective magistrate being delegated to each sector, as per Assiniboia's first judicature. It was created in likeness of Canada's Charter, giving the Governor and the council the ability to judge cases through a court of law. Quarterly petty courts began to be held, where each magistrate—with the presence of two constables—could judge petty offence cases including those about debts of less than 40 shillings. Another set of quarterly courts were held in the governor's residence for more severe cases, including debts over 40 shillings, as well as all cases of appeal. The same year, the council also instituted a 7.5% tariff on both the settlement's imports and exports. This went to compensate the costs of the court for implementing rules, regulations, and laws in order to keep tranquility among the colony.

Prior to 1835, the constabulary in the Red River Settlement was appointed by Assiniboia's councillors, and they were tasked with routine duties. However, in 1835, the way the constabulary was organized shifted tremendously, as they were all dismissed and completely replaced with a group of 60 men who had all enlisted in the new Volunteer Corps style of authority. This change made the police force both more efficient as well as more disposable to the company. Every constable was required to take an oath that stated their dual positions as both part of the police force of the colony, as well as privates in a military corps. As stated by the Council of Assiniboia, the goal was "every thing connected with the good order or discipline of the Corps be as much as possible in union with and conformable to the practice and usages connected with such service in the British Army." To further empower this new authority, it was requested by the governor and the council that Assiniboia's military/police force be equipped with the guns and ammunition that was necessary to enforce both tranquility and respect. The officers in London were quick to approve the request, even though Alexander Ross—a council member as well as the settlement's first historian—disagreed with the need for armed military-styled police. As a British-colonized territory, he argued that it would conflict with Britain's 1761 Militia Act, which restricted any form of peace officer from also serving in the country's militia. In order to prevent the Volunteer Corps from holding too much power, the Council of Assiniboia enacted certain limitations for the force in order to publicly supervise them, such as the need for annual approval of their funding by the council.

=== 1836–1844 ===
In 1836, two changes occurred: first, the Council of Assiniboia was made more representative, as the number of council members grew from 5 to 15; and secondly, the tariff was lowered to 5%, and then 4% the consecutive year as decided by officers in London. The rate was never again changed until 1870, when Canada legally acquired the territory. Then in 1837, the council altered the resolution that created four districts, and instead divided the Red River Colony into three districts, with each having two magistrates assigned. With this alteration also came adjustments to the classification between petty and serious crimes: petty cases were now defined by debts under £5, and serious cases were over that amount. Another major reformation happened in 1839, when the Hudson's Bay Company introduced a new judicature to the District of Assiniboia. With this came the creation of a governor-in-chief of Rupert's Land - George Simpson - who overruled Assiniboia's governor, and a newly appointed president of the Council of Assiniboia. Councils for both Assiniboia and Rupert's Land were transformed in the new administration, as new members of council, such as governors, magistrates, councillors, and sheriffs arrived from London.

Two years following, in 1841, Red River Colony's judicature was altered so that the petty court cases were defined as those with fines of less than 20 shillings. The council also continued to restructure the police force as – in 1843 – they put an end to the role of sergeant-major in an effort to keep the Volunteer Corps both accountable and responsible. They also instituted constraints in order to prevent the existence of career soldiers by requiring half of the privates to be replaced every other year. That was not the end of the changes to the force though as, in 1844, the number of recruitments was lowered to 50, and examinations into the constables' characters by the magistrates were routinely done. The officers also would not be paid unless they received a certificate of good conduct by their commanding officer.

=== 1845–1870 ===
It was 1845 when the Council of Assiniboia completely disbanded the Volunteer Corps and replaced it with 15 constables that had been appointed by the council. This new constabulary was tasked with executing writs and assisting their local magistrates—to whom from then on received the power to appoint, review, and dismiss constables. It was through these changes that the council adopted the English common law framework in their courts, and completely abandoned the military-styled organization that the company was trying to create. The council also instituted a more efficient, two-tiered court system that involved a minimal payment to start a case. During this time, Adam Thom, the council's recorder, also amended the current local laws and officially turned them into a legal code. A law amendment committee was also introduced by the council in 1851, consisting of Adam Thom, Louis LaFleche, and Dr. John Bunn. From 1869 to 1870, when Rupert's Land joined the newly confederated dominion of Canada, the Council of Assiniboia was disbanded. When Louis Riel sought counsel with the Council of Assiniboia insisting that negotiations needed to be made with Canada, on behalf of the local Métis, his demands were rejected. In response Riel created the council's successor, the short-lived Legislative Assembly of Assiniboia, soon followed by the Red River Rebellion. This was the early development of the judiciary in Manitoba, but even broader, "Assiniboia's legal history is central to the legal history of the Canadian frontier."

== Members ==
Position	Member	Period	Citation
Councillor	David Thomas Jones	1835-1838	
Councillor	John Bunn	1835-1861?	
Councillor	John MacCallum	1836-1849?	
Councillor	Alexander Ross	1836-1850	
Councillor	George Marcus Cary	1837-1847	
Councillor	William Hemmings Cook	1839-?	
Councillor	Cuthbert Grant	1839-?	
Councillor	Andrew McDermot	1839-1846 1847-1851	
Councillor	Roderick Mackenzie	1839-1852	
Councillor	John Peter Pruden	1839-?	
Recorder	Adam Thom	1839-1851	
Councillor	François-Jacques Bruneau	1853-?	
Councillor	William Cowan	1853-?	
Councillor	Robert McBeath (McBeth)	1853-1870	
Councillor	Pascal Breland (Berland)	1857-1868	
Councillor	John Inkster	1857-1868	
President	William Mactavish	1858-1870	
Councillor	John Black	1862-1870	
Councillor	Andrew Graham Ballenden Bannatyne	1868-1870	
Councillor	Curtis James Bird	1868-1870	
Clerk	Thomas Bunn	1868-1870	
Councillor	James McKay	1868-1870	
