= Clarence Baker =

Canadian politician

Member of the Legislative Assembly of Manitoba for Lac Du Bonnet
- In office March 18, 1986 – April 26, 1988
- Preceded by: Sam Uskiw
- Succeeded by: Darren Praznik

Personal details
- Born: July 7, 1928 Cromwell, Manitoba, Canada
- Died: October 15, 2006 (aged 78) Beausejour, Manitoba, Canada
- Political party: New Democratic
- Occupation: Farmer, politician

Clarence Baker (July 7, 1928 – October 15, 2006) was a politician in Manitoba, Canada. He was a member of the Legislative Assembly of Manitoba from 1986 to 1988, representing the riding of Lac Du Bonnet for the New Democratic Party.

The son of Anton and Pauline Baker, Baker was born in the municipality of Cromwell, Manitoba, and worked as a farmer before entering political life. In 1951, he married Ilene Weidman. He was a delegate to the Manitoba Pool Elevators for thirty years, and was named Manitoba Farmer of the Year in 1984. Baker served as Reeve of Brokenhead from 1976 to 1998, was a councillor for two, and served on the Union of Manitoba Municipalities for five years. He also served on the local hospital board for nine years, including three years as chair.

In the provincial election of 1986, Baker was elected to the Manitoba legislature for Lac Du Bonnet, defeating Darren Praznik of the Progressive Conservative Party by 302 votes. He was not appointed to the cabinet of Howard Pawley, and was defeated by Praznik in the 1988 election.

Baker later returned to municipal politics, and was re-elected as reeve of Brokenhead. He died in 2006.
