= Sandy-Saulteaux Spiritual Centre =

Coordinates: 50.0591°N 96.4656°W

- Type: Theological college
- Established: 2011
- Affiliations: United Church of Canada
- Director: Robert Smith (Keeper of the Centre), Adrian Jacobs (Keeper of the Circle)
- Academic staff: 6
- Location: Beausejour, Manitoba, Canada
- Campus: Rural
- Website: sandysaulteaux.ca

The Sandy-Saulteaux Spiritual Centre is a ministry training centre of the United Church of Canada dedicated to Indigenous theological education. The centre was established on September 30, 2011, as an amalgamation of the former Francis Sandy Theological Centre and Dr. Jessie Saulteaux Resource Centre.

Its mandate is to, among other things,

provide culturally specific theological education and preparation for both lay and ordered ministry that respects both Christian beliefs and traditional First Nation, Métis, and Inuit spirituality and values, to promote right relations through cross-cultural healing and learning between First Nation, Métis, and Inuit peoples of diverse identities and non-Indigenous peoples and communities; and to deepen local, regional, national, and global ecumenical and interfaith relations, particularly with Indigenous peoples.

It is located on the shores of the Brokenhead River, just outside of Beausejour, Manitoba.

== History ==
The Centre is named for Francis Sandy, an Ojibwa elder and lay minister, and Jessie Saulteaux, an Assiniboine elder and church leader.

== Programs ==
The Sandy-Saulteaux Spiritual Centre offers a variety of programs for both Indigenous and non-Indigenous individuals. Although the centre is affiliated with, and supported by, the United Church of Canada, the programs themselves are ecumenical. Students of various Christian backgrounds have studied at the centre, including Anglicans, Lutherans, Presbyterians, and Mennonites.
