= Albert Trapp =

Canadian politician

Albert Trapp MLA

Member of the Legislative Assembly of Manitoba for St. Clements
- In office 1950–1953
- Preceded by: Nicholas Stryk
- Succeeded by: Stanley Copp

Personal details
- Born: October 2, 1888
- Died: January 9, 1953 (aged 64)
- Party: Liberal-Progressive

Albert Friedrich Trapp (October 2, 1886 – January 9, 1953) was a politician in Manitoba, Canada. He served in the Legislative Assembly of Manitoba from 1951 until his death.

Trapp was the son of Wilhelm Trapp, a German immigrant. In 1913, he married Charlotte Arnhold. He served on the council for the Rural Municipality of Brokenhead, also serving as reeve, was a school trustee and helped found the Brokenhead Agricultural Society.

Trapp was elected to the Manitoba legislature in a by-election held in St. Clements on October 24, 1950, following the death of the previous member, Nicholas Stryk. He easily defeated candidates from the Cooperative Commonwealth Federation and Labour Progressive Party, and served as a backbench supporter of Douglas Campbell's government.

Trapp's time in the legislature was brief, as he died in office in Beausejour in 1953. His son, A.A. Trapp, also served in the legislature in the 1950s.
