= Fred Klym =

Canadian politician (1907-1988)

Fred Theodore Klym (September 28, 1907 in Brokenhead, Manitoba – November 25, 1988) was a politician in Manitoba, Canada. He was a Progressive Conservative member of the Legislative Assembly of Manitoba from 1959 to 1969.

Klym was the son of Fred Klym and Maria Molinski, immigrants from Ukraine who came to Canada in 1907. Although he had initially planned to become a lawyer and began his studies at the University of Manitoba, the Depression intervened, and to assist his family, he changed his educational focus, and transferred to the Manitoba Teacher Training School. He taught school from 1930 to 1956. Klym bought the family farm when his parents moved to Beausejour, Manitoba in 1949, farming there until 1972.

He was initially associated with the Liberal-Progressive Party, and unsuccessfully sought that party's nomination in St. Clements for the 1953 provincial election. He registered as an Independent Liberal-Progressive candidate after losing the nomination to Stanley Copp by six votes, but withdrew before election day.

Klym later switched to the Progressive Conservative Party, and was first elected to the Manitoba legislature in the 1959 provincial election, defeating Liberal-Progressive incumbent William Lucko by 371 votes in the Winnipeg-area riding of Springfield. He defeated Lucko again by 431 votes in the 1962 election, and by 584 votes in that of 1966. On the latter occasion, Richard Loeb of the New Democratic Party finished second.

Klym was a solid backbench supporter of the governments of Dufferin Roblin and Walter Weir. He was instrumental in the creation of the Alfred Hole Goose Sanctuary, located within Whiteshell Provincial Park, and was an ardent supporter of the construction of the Red River Floodway - the floodway created to protect the City of Winnipeg from the nearly annual spring flooding of the Red River.

He ran in the 1969 provincial election in the significantly redistributed riding of Lac du Bonnet, and was defeated by Samuel Uskiw of the NDP.
