= Stanley Copp =

Canadian politician (1914–1987)

Stanley Copp MLA

Member of the Legislative Assembly of Manitoba for St. Clements
- In office June 8, 1953 – June 16, 1958
- Preceded by: Albert Trapp
- Succeeded by: Electoral district eliminated for redistribution

Mayor of North Kildonan
- In office 1964–1965

Rural municipality of North Kildonan municipal Councillor
- In office 1945–1954

Personal details
- Born: May 25, 1914
- Died: May 1, 1987 (aged 72) Winnipeg, Manitoba
- Party: Liberal-Progressive

Stanley Copp (May 25, 1914 – May 1, 1987) was a politician in Manitoba, Canada. He served in the Legislative Assembly of Manitoba as a Liberal-Progressive from 1953 to 1958.

== Early life and career ==
Copp was born in Winnipeg and educated in North Kildonan, now part of the City of Winnipeg. He first worked as a market gardener and later opened a restaurant in 1959.

== Political career ==
He was a councillor on the Rural Municipality of North Kildonan from 1945–1954 and later served as Mayor of North Kildonan from 1964-1965.

Copp won the Liberal-Progressive nomination for St. Clements in the spring of 1953, defeating Fred Klym by six votes. He was then elected to the legislature in the 1953 provincial election, defeating an opponent from the Cooperative Commonwealth Federation (CCF). He served as a backbench supporter of Douglas Campbell's government.

Copp appears to have left the Liberal-Progressives before the 1958 provincial election, and campaigned for re-election as an independent candidate in Brokenhead. He lost, finishing fourth against CCF candidate Edward Schreyer.

After this defeat, Copp became a perennial candidate seeking a return to the assembly. He ran for the assembly again in the 1959 election, but received only 346 votes as an independent candidate in Lac du Bonnet, for a fourth-place finish. The winner was Progressive Conservative Oscar Bjornson.

In the 1966 election, he ran as an Independent Liberal in Brokenhead and received 669 votes, finishing third behind NDP candidate Sam Uskiw. Finally, he campaigned against NDP leader Edward Schreyer in the 1969 election as an independent, and finished a distant fourth with 238 votes.

== Death ==
He died in Winnipeg in on May 1, 1987.
