= A. A. Trapp =

Canadian politician

Arthur A. "Archie" Trapp (November 7, 1918 – August 2, 2007) was a politician in Manitoba, Canada. He served in the Legislative Assembly of Manitoba as a Liberal-Progressive from 1958 to 1959.

The son of Albert Trapp and Charlotte Arnhold, he was born in Brokenhead, Manitoba. Trapp farmed and also operated timber and auctioneering businesses. He married Juliana Freund. Like his father, he served as reeve for the Rural Municipality of Brokenhead. Trapp later was employed with the Department of Indian Affairs. After his retirement, he became owner and operator of a fishing lodge in northern Manitoba.

Trapp was elected to the Manitoba legislature in the 1958 provincial election, defeating Progressive Conservative candidate G.A. Stewart by 176 votes in the mid-northern constituency of Lac Du Bonnet. He served in the parliamentary opposition during his time in the legislature.

In the 1959 election, Trapp challenged Cooperative Commonwealth Federation Edward Schreyer in the neighbouring constituency of Brokenhead. He was unsuccessful, finishing in third place.

He died in Winnipeg at the age of 88.
