= Ann Crapleve =

Ann Crapleve Smith BEM (1920–2005) was a member of the Canadian Women's Army Corps during the Second World War. She was one of the first Ukrainian volunteers for the Corps.

Born in Ladywood, Manitoba, she worked in Winnipeg as an accountant. She enlisted in 1941 and was sent overseas, where she joined the Ukrainian Canadian Servicemen's Association. She was awarded the British Empire Medal and promoted to the rank of lieutenant in 1944. After V-E Day she went to Germany to help coordinate the withdrawal of Canadian forces.

She was demobilized in 1946 but soon returned with the Central Ukrainian Relief Bureau (CURB) to provide assistance to Ukrainians residing in displaced persons camps. She joined the Canadian Humanitarian Aid Mission and in 1947 was selected to lead CURB in Europe.

After returning to Canada in 1951, she volunteered with the Royal Canadian Legion and at the Manitoba Museum. She was one of the individuals featured in the documentary A Canadian War Story, which described Ukrainian Canadian participation in the war effort.
