= Nicholas Stryk =

Canadian politician

Nicholas Stryk MLA

Member of the Legislative Assembly of Manitoba for St. Clements
- In office 1941–1945
- Preceded by: Herbert Sulkers
- Succeeded by: Wilbert Doneleyko

Member of the Legislative Assembly of Manitoba for St. Clements
- In office 1949–1950
- Preceded by: Wilbert Doneleyko
- Succeeded by: Albert Trapp

Personal details
- Party: Liberal-Progressive

Nicholas John Stryk (December 17, 1896 in the Austro-Hungarian Empire – July 11, 1950) was a politician in Manitoba, Canada. He served in the Legislative Assembly of Manitoba as a Liberal-Progressive from 1941 to 1945, and again from 1949 until 1950.

Stryk was born to John Stryk and Katherine Steslimb in Austria-Hungary, and came to Canada in 1899. He was educated in Manitoba, and worked as a school teacher in Ladywood for twenty-six years. He was fluent in both English and Ukrainian. In 1921, he became a Notary Public and Commissioner.

He sought election to the House of Commons of Canada in the federal election of 1935 as a Liberal-Progressive, but finished third in Springfield against official Liberal candidate John Mouat Turner.

He was first elected to the Manitoba legislature in the 1941 provincial election, defeating CCF incumbent Herbert Sulkers by almost one thousand votes in the constituency of St. Clements. He served as a government backbencher in the parliament which followed.

Stryk sought re-election in the 1945 provincial election, but lost to CCF candidate Wilbert Doneleyko by 220 votes. Donelyko was later expelled from the CCF caucus for promoting anti-NATO views, and Stryk defeated him without difficulty in the 1949 election to return to the legislature.

He again served as a government backbencher, and died in office the following year. Stryk was in an ambulance on its way to Beausejour at the time of his death. He had been married to Elizabeth Neyedly just two months earlier.
