= Matthew Stanbridge =

Canadian politician (1876–1939)

Member of the Legislative Assembly of Manitoba from St. Clements
- In office 1920–1922
- Preceded by: Donald A. Ross
- Succeeded by: Donald A. Ross

Personal details
- Born: 1876 Worth Parish, Sussex, England
- Died: May 20, 1939 (aged 63) Winnipeg, Manitoba, Canada
- Party: DLP
- Other political affiliations: Independent Labour

Matthew James Stanbridge (1876 – May 20, 1939) was a British-born Canadian politician who served as a member of the Legislative Assembly of Manitoba from 1920 to 1922.

== Early life ==
Stanbridge was born in Worth Parish, Sussex, England and came to Western Canada in 1903.

== Career ==
Stanbridge operated an insurance and real estate business in Winnipeg and became the owner of a meat-packing plant in Stonewall in 1912. Stanbridge served 15 years on the school board for Stonewall. He married Frances Rudderham.

He was elected to the Manitoba legislature in the 1920 provincial election as a Labour Party candidate in the St. Clements constituency. He defeated Liberal incumbent Donald A. Ross by 127 votes, and sat with the Labour parliamentary group in the legislative opposition for the next two years.

The Labour Party and its allies won eleven seats in the 1920 election, which occurred shortly after the Winnipeg General Strike of 1919. Their support had declined by the time of the 1922 election, and fell to six seats. Stanbridge, running for the Independent Labour Party in St. Clements, finished fourth in a field of four candidates in his bid for re-election.

He attempted to return to the legislature in the 1927 provincial election as a "Farmer-Labour" candidate, but finished a distant third against Progressive cabinet minister Robert Hoey.

== Personal life ==
He died in the Winnipeg General Hospital at the age of 63.
