= St. Clements (electoral district) =

Defunct provincial electoral district in Manitoba, Canada

St. Clements is a former provincial electoral district in Manitoba, Canada, which existed on two separate occasions. The original constituency was one of twenty-four established at the province's creation in 1870. It was eliminated through redistribution before the 1888 provincial election, but was restored for the 1914 election. The division was eliminated for the second time by redistribution prior to the 1958 election.

St. Clements was located to the northeast of Winnipeg. After its elimination, much of its territory was included in the new constituency of Brokenhead.

== Members of the Legislative Assembly ==
This riding has elected the following members of the Legislative Assembly of Manitoba:

Name	Party	Took office	Left office
Thomas Bunn	Government Supporter (probable)	1870	1874
Thomas Howard	Opposition	1874	1878
John Sifton	Independent-Liberal	1878	1879
Edward Hay	Independent-Liberal	1879	1883
John Allan	Conservative	1883	1886
David Glass	Independent Conservative	1886	1888
Riding abolished until from 1888–1914
Donald A. Ross	Liberal-Independent	1914	1920
Matthew Stanbridge	Dominion Labour Party	1920	1920
Matthew Stanbridge	Independent Labour Party	1920	1922
Donald A. Ross	Independent	1922	1927
Robert Hoey	Progressive	1927	1932
Robert Hoey	Liberal–Progressive	1932	1936
Herbert Sulkers	Cooperative Commonwealth Federation	1936	1941
Nicholas Stryk	Liberal–Progressive	1941	1945
Wilbert Doneleyko	Cooperative Commonwealth Federation	1945	1949
Wilbert Doneleyko	Independent Cooperative Commonwealth Federation	1949	1949
Nicholas Stryk	Liberal–Progressive	1949	1950
Albert Trapp	Liberal–Progressive	1950	1953
Stanley Copp	Liberal–Progressive	1953	1958

== Election results ==
=== 1870 ===
1870 Manitoba general election
Party	Candidate	Votes	%
Undeclared	Thomas Bunn	39	54.93%
Undeclared	Charles Begg	32	45.07%
Total		71	–
Rejected		N/A	–
Eligible voters / Turnout		N/A	–
Source(s) Source: Manitoba. Chief Electoral Officer (1999). Statement of Votes for the 37th Provincial General Election, September 21, 1999 (PDF) (Report). Winnipeg: Elections Manitoba.

=== 1874 ===
1874 Manitoba general election
Party	Candidate	Votes	%	±%
Undeclared	Thomas Howard	62	63.92%	-36.08%
Undeclared	William Leask	35	36.08%	-63.92%
Total		97	–	–
Rejected		N/A	–	
Eligible voters / Turnout		149	65.10%	–
Source(s) Source: Manitoba. Chief Electoral Officer (1999). Statement of Votes for the 37th Provincial General Election, September 21, 2000 (PDF) (Report). Winnipeg: Elections Manitoba.

=== 1878 ===
1878 Manitoba general election
Party	Candidate	Votes	%	±%
Undeclared	John Wright Sifton	87	56.49%	-43.51%
Undeclared	Robert Martin Bullock	43	27.92%	-72.08%
Undeclared	Captain Vaughan	24	15.58%	-84.42%
Total		154	–	–
Rejected		N/A	–	
Eligible voters / Turnout		265	58.11%	-6.99%
Source(s) Source: Manitoba. Chief Electoral Officer (1999). Statement of Votes for the 37th Provincial General Election, September 21, 2004 (PDF) (Report). Winnipeg: Elections Manitoba.

=== 1879 ===
1879 Manitoba general election
Party	Candidate	Votes	%	±%
Undeclared	Edward Hay	120	45.98%	-54.02%
Undeclared	John Gunn	81	31.03%	-68.97%
Liberal	John Wright Sifton	60	22.99%	–
Total		261	–	–
Rejected		N/A	–	
Eligible voters / Turnout		261	100.00%	41.89%
Source(s) Source: Manitoba. Chief Electoral Officer (1999). Statement of Votes for the 37th Provincial General Election, September 21, 2005 (PDF) (Report). Winnipeg: Elections Manitoba.

=== 1883 ===
1883 Manitoba general election
Party	Candidate	Votes	%	±%
Conservative	John Beresford Allan	94	54.65%	–
Liberal	John Gunn	78	45.35%	22.36%
Total		172	–	–
Rejected		N/A	–	
Eligible voters / Turnout		N/A	–	–
Source(s) Source: Manitoba. Chief Electoral Officer (1999). Statement of Votes for the 37th Provincial General Election, September 21, 2009 (PDF) (Report). Winnipeg: Elections Manitoba.

=== 1886 ===
1886 Manitoba general election
Party	Candidate	Votes	%	±%
Independent	David Glass	151	42.18%	–
Conservative	Robert Hay	147	41.06%	-13.59%
Liberal	W. J. Robinson	60	16.76%	-28.59%
Total		358	–	–
Rejected		N/A	–	
Eligible voters / Turnout		744	48.12%	–
Source(s) Source: Manitoba. Chief Electoral Officer (1999). Statement of Votes for the 37th Provincial General Election, September 21, 2012 (PDF) (Report). Winnipeg: Elections Manitoba.

=== 1914 ===
1914 Manitoba general election
Party	Candidate	Votes	%	±%
Liberal	Donald A. Ross	1,025	53.61%	36.85%
Conservative	Thomas Hay	887	46.39%	5.33%
Total		1,912	–	–
Rejected		N/A	–	
Eligible voters / Turnout		2,479	77.13%	29.01%
Source(s) Source: Manitoba. Chief Electoral Officer (1999). Statement of Votes for the 37th Provincial General Election, September 21, 2037 (PDF) (Report). Winnipeg: Elections Manitoba.

=== 1915 ===
1915 Manitoba general election
Party	Candidate	Votes	%	±%
Liberal	Donald A. Ross	1,014	67.47%	13.86%
Conservative	Thomas Hay	489	32.53%	-13.86%
Total		1,503	–	–
Rejected		N/A	–	
Eligible voters / Turnout		2,553	58.87%	-18.26%
Source(s) Source: Manitoba. Chief Electoral Officer (1999). Statement of Votes for the 37th Provincial General Election, September 21, 2038 (PDF) (Report). Winnipeg: Elections Manitoba.

=== 1920 ===
1920 Manitoba general election
Party	Candidate	Votes	%	±%
Labour	Matthew Stanbridge	977	43.00%	–
Liberal	Donald A. Ross	850	37.41%	-30.05%
Farmer	H. McLennan	445	19.59%	–
Total		2,272	–	–
Rejected		N/A	–	
Eligible voters / Turnout		4,399	51.65%	-7.22%
Source(s) Source: Manitoba. Chief Electoral Officer (1999). Statement of Votes for the 37th Provincial General Election, September 21, 2042 (PDF) (Report). Winnipeg: Elections Manitoba.

=== 1922 ===
1922 Manitoba general election
Party	Candidate	Votes	%	±%
Independent	Donald A. Ross	1,245	49.48%	–
United Farmers	Hugh Connolly	532	21.14%	–
Labour	Nicolas Kolisnyk	387	15.38%	-27.62%
Labour	Matthew Stanbridge	352	13.99%	-29.01%
Total		2,516	–	–
Rejected		N/A	–	
Eligible voters / Turnout		5,149	48.86%	-2.78%
Source(s) Source: Manitoba. Chief Electoral Officer (1999). Statement of Votes for the 37th Provincial General Election, September 21, 2044 (PDF) (Report). Winnipeg: Elections Manitoba.

=== 1927 ===
1927 Manitoba general election
Party	Candidate	Votes	%	±%
Progressive	Robert Hoey	2,146	53.36%	–
Independent	Donald A. Ross	1,436	35.70%	-13.78%
Independent	Matthew Stanbridge	440	10.94%	–
Total		4,022	–	–
Rejected		N/A	–	
Eligible voters / Turnout		6,172	65.17%	16.30%
Source(s) Source: Manitoba. Chief Electoral Officer (1999). Statement of Votes for the 37th Provincial General Election, September 21, 2047 (PDF) (Report). Winnipeg: Elections Manitoba.

=== 1932 ===
1932 Manitoba general election
Party	Candidate	Votes	%	±%
Liberal–Progressive	Robert Hoey	3,655	44.70%	–
Conservative	R. J. M. Bate	2,285	27.95%	–
Labour	T. H. Dunn	1,824	22.31%	–
Liberal	R. A. Smith	412	5.04%	–
Total		8,176	–	–
Rejected		N/A	–	
Eligible voters / Turnout		11,161	73.26%	8.09%
Source(s) Source: Manitoba. Chief Electoral Officer (1999). Statement of Votes for the 37th Provincial General Election, September 21, 2051 (PDF) (Report). Winnipeg: Elections Manitoba.

=== 1936 ===
1936 Manitoba general election
Party	Candidate	Votes	%	±%
Independent Labour	Herbert Sulkers	3,819	45.97%	–
Liberal–Progressive	Robert Hoey	3,154	37.96%	-6.74%
Social Credit	R. J. M. Bates	1,335	16.07%	–
Total		8,308	–	–
Rejected		373	–	
Eligible voters / Turnout		12,901	64.40%	-8.86%
Source(s) Source: Manitoba. Chief Electoral Officer (1999). Statement of Votes for the 37th Provincial General Election, September 21, 2054 (PDF) (Report). Winnipeg: Elections Manitoba.

=== 1941 ===
1941 Manitoba general election
Party	Candidate	Votes	%	±%
Liberal–Progressive	Nicholas Stryk	3,627	57.75%	19.78%
Co-operative Commonwealth	Herbert Sulkers	2,654	42.25%	–
Total		6,281	–	–
Rejected		153	–	
Eligible voters / Turnout		14,305	43.91%	-20.49%
Source(s) Source: Manitoba. Chief Electoral Officer (1999). Statement of Votes for the 37th Provincial General Election, September 21, 2055 (PDF) (Report). Winnipeg: Elections Manitoba.

=== 1945 ===
1945 Manitoba general election
Party	Candidate	Votes	%	±%
Co-operative Commonwealth	Wilbert Doneleyko	3,615	44.90%	2.65%
Liberal–Progressive	Nicholas Stryk	3,395	42.17%	-15.58%
Labor–Progressive	Andrew Bileski	1,041	12.93%	–
Total		8,051	–	–
Rejected		86	–	
Eligible voters / Turnout		15,074	53.41%	9.50%
Source(s) Source: Manitoba. Chief Electoral Officer (1999). Statement of Votes for the 37th Provincial General Election, September 21, 2057 (PDF) (Report). Winnipeg: Elections Manitoba.

=== 1949 ===
1949 Manitoba general election
Party	Candidate	Votes	%	±%
Liberal–Progressive	Nicholas Stryk	2,752	70.15%	27.98%
Independent	Wilbert Doneleyko	1,171	29.85%	–
Total		3,923	–	–
Rejected		76	–	
Eligible voters / Turnout		10,161	38.61%	-14.80%
Source(s) Source: Manitoba. Chief Electoral Officer (1999). Statement of Votes for the 37th Provincial General Election, September 21, 2059 (PDF) (Report). Winnipeg: Elections Manitoba.

=== 1950 by-election ===
Manitoba provincial by-election, 1950
Party	Candidate	Votes	%	±%
Unknown	Albert Trapp	2,729	77.03%	–
Unknown	Harry Wasylyk	560	15.81%	–
Unknown	Andrew Bileski	254	7.17%	–
Total		3,543	–	–
Rejected		N/A	–	
Eligible voters / Turnout		N/A	–	–
Source(s) Source: Manitoba. Chief Electoral Officer (1999). Statement of Votes for the 37th Provincial General Election, September 21, 2061 (PDF) (Report). Winnipeg: Elections Manitoba.

=== 1953 ===
1953 Manitoba general election
Party	Candidate	Votes	%	±%
Liberal–Progressive	Stanley Copp	2,821	51.43%	–
Co-operative Commonwealth	Edgar E. Smee	1,358	24.76%	–
Social Credit	Osborne A. Earle	935	17.05%	–
Progressive Conservative	Walter Hudson Whyte	371	6.76%	–
Total		5,485	–	–
Rejected		259	–	
Eligible voters / Turnout		9,991	54.90%	–
Source(s) Source: Manitoba. Chief Electoral Officer (1999). Statement of Votes for the 37th Provincial General Election, September 21, 2062 (PDF) (Report). Winnipeg: Elections Manitoba.

== See also ==
- List of Manitoba provincial electoral districts
- Canadian provincial electoral districts
