= Sun Gro Horticulture =

North American landscaping product company

- Type: Private
- Industry: Manufacturing
- Founded: Vancouver, British Columbia (1929)
- Headquarters: Agawam, MA, U.S.
- Number of locations: 27
- Area served: North America
- Products: Peat moss (processed, baled or concentrated) based growing mixes for professional and retail markets.
- Number of employees: about 350 (950 at peak seasons)
- Website: www.sungro.com

Sun Gro Horticulture is a producer of peat moss and bark-based growing mixes for professional use in North America. It is also a distributor of fertilizer, water-soluble fertilizer, perlite, and vermiculite.

== History ==
- 1929 Founded in Vancouver as Western Peat Company Ltd.
- 1947 Opens new production facilities operating in Manitoba, Canada.
- 1964 Opens production facilities in Maisonnette, New Brunswick.
- 1974 Sold to S.B. Mclaughlin Associates, LTD
- 1980 Sold to Fisons PLC and renamed Fisons Western Peat Moss Ltd.
- 1982 Renamed to Fisons Horticulture when the Fisons PLC acquisition was completed.
- 1984 Acquired operations of Langley Peat North, Ltd. of Seba Beach, Alberta.
- 1987 Opened two new satellite mix plants, one in Quincy, Michigan and the second in Terrell, Texas.
- 1993 Sold to Macluan Capital Inc., and renamed Sun Gro Horticulture, Inc.
- 1995 Hines Horticulture, Inc. acquired Sun Gro-U.S. and its subsidiaries.
- 1998 Hines Horticulture, Inc. acquired Lakeland Peat Moss, Ltd. and Pacific Soils, Inc. including their product line.
- 1999 Sun Gro as a subsidiary of Hines Horticulture, Inc. Acquires Pro Gro Products, Inc.
- 2002 Hines Horticulture, Inc. sold Sun Gro Horticulture in a Canadian initial public offering.
- 2004 Acquired Lameque Quality Group.
- 2004 Sun Gro Horticulture paid US$6 million to acquire Scotts' professional growing products.
- 2005 Acquired Pigeon Hill Peat.
- 2006 Acquired Normiska Peat.
- 2007 Sun Gro acquired Quebec peat moss producer Tourbiere Omer Belanger Inc. for $3.9 million.
- 2007 Acquired Kellogg-Rich Grow.
- 2007 Acquired Grow Best Holdings, LLC for US$20.3 million. Grow Best Holdings owns Florida Potting Soils, Inc. and Sunshine Peat, Inc., both based in Orlando, Florida.
- 2011 The company is acquired by 1582956 Alberta Ltd.

== Products ==
- Sunshine
- LakeLand
- Metro-Mix
- Nutricote
- Black Gold
- Redi-Earth
- Technicote
- Technigro
- Fafard

== Associations ==
Sun Gro is a member of the Canadian Sphagnum Peat Moss Association which was founded 1988 to promote the benefits of peat moss and campaign on environmental issues. The CSPMA's Restoration Policy has prompted Sun Gro to produce its own Environmental & Restoration Policy.

== Naming rights ==
Sun Gro has naming rights to the Sun Gro Centre in Beausejour, Manitoba and occasionally sponsors events there.
