= Bob Davie =

Bob Davie may refer to:

- Bob Davie (American football) (born 1954), New Mexico Lobos football coach, former head coach of Notre Dame
- Bob Davie (ice hockey) (1912–1990), Canadian ice hockey player
- Bob Hutch Davie (born c. 1932), orchestra leader, pianist, and composer of popular music

== See also ==
- Robert C. Davey (1853–1908), U.S. Representative from Louisiana
