= Lac du Bonnet (electoral district) =

Provincial electoral district in Manitoba, Canada

Coordinates: 50.889°N 95.866°W

Manitoba electoral district

Provincial electoral district
- Legislature: Legislative Assembly of Manitoba
MLA
Wayne Ewasko
Progressive Conservative
- District created: 1957
- First contested: 1958
- Last contested: 2019

Demographics
- Population (2016): 23,005
- Electors (2019): 15,477
- Area (km²): 11,337
- Pop. density (per km²): 2

Lac du Bonnet (French: Lac-du-Bonnet) is a provincial electoral district of Manitoba, Canada. It was created by redistribution in 1957, and has formally existed since the provincial election of 1958. It is a relatively large constituency, located to the northeast of the city of Winnipeg.

Lac du Bonnet is bordered to the west by Red River North and Dawson Trail, to the south by La Verendrye, to the north by Keewatinook and to the east by the Ontario border. Communities in the riding include Lac Du Bonnet, Pinawa, Beausejour, Whitemouth, Tyndall, Hadashville, Ste. Rita, and Powerview-Pine Falls.

The riding is currently regarded as a Progressive Conservative/New Democratic Party marginal. The Tories have held the seat since 1988, though they retained it by only a narrow majority in 2003.

== Demographics ==
The riding's population in 1996 was 20,035. In 1999, the average family income was $45,693, and the unemployment rate was 9.00%. There are a number of diverse economic communities in the riding, including farming, forestry and nuclear research. The service sector accounted for 12% of the riding's industry in 1999, followed by 10% in health and social services.

Lac Du Bonnet is an ethnically diverse riding. Eighteen per cent of the riding's residents are aboriginal, along with 9% German and 6% Ukrainian. Six per cent of the riding's residents are francophone.

== Members of the Legislative Assembly ==
This riding has elected the following MLAs:

Parliament	Years	Member	Party
Riding created from Rupertsland, St. Clements, and Springfield
22nd	1958–1959	A.A. Trapp	Liberal-Progressive
23rd	1959–1962	Oscar Bjornson	Progressive Conservative
24th	1962–1966	Oscar Bjornson	Progressive Conservative
25th	1966–1969	Oscar Bjornson	Progressive Conservative
26th	1969–1973	Sam Uskiw	New Democratic
27th	1973–1977	Sam Uskiw	New Democratic
28th	1977–1981	Sam Uskiw	New Democratic
29th	1981–1986	Sam Uskiw	New Democratic
30th	1986–1988	Clarence Baker	New Democratic
31st	1988–1990	Darren Praznik	Progressive Conservative
32nd	1990–1995	Darren Praznik	Progressive Conservative
33rd	1995–1999	Darren Praznik	Progressive Conservative
34th	1999–2002	Darren Praznik	Progressive Conservative
34th	2002–2003	Gerald Hawranik	Progressive Conservative
35th	2003–2007	Gerald Hawranik	Progressive Conservative
36th	2007–2011	Gerald Hawranik	Progressive Conservative
37th	2011–2016	Wayne Ewasko	Progressive Conservative
38th	2016–2019	Wayne Ewasko	Progressive Conservative
39th	2019-	Wayne Ewasko	Progressive Conservative

== Election results ==
=== 1958 ===
1958 Manitoba general election
Party	Candidate	Votes	%
Liberal–Progressive	A. A. Trapp	1,526	40.76
Progressive Conservative	Glen Stewart	1,350	36.06
Co-operative Commonwealth	Harry Olensky	569	15.20
Social Credit	Lawrence Schlamp	299	7.99
Total valid votes		3,744	99.07
Rejected		35	0.93
Eligible voters / Turnout		5,696	66.34
Source(s) Source: Manitoba. Chief Electoral Officer (1999). Statement of Votes for the 37th Provincial General Election, September 21, 1999 (PDF) (Report). Winnipeg: Elections Manitoba.

=== 1959 ===
1959 Manitoba general election
Party	Candidate	Votes	%	±%
Progressive Conservative	Oscar Bjornson	1,357	33.98	-2.07
Liberal–Progressive	John Ateah	1,272	31.86	-8.90
Co-operative Commonwealth	Donald H. MacLean	1,018	25.49	+10.30
Independent	Stanley Copp	346	8.67	–
Total valid votes		3,993	99.80	+0.73
Rejected		8	0.20	-0.73
Eligible voters / Turnout		5,622	71.17	+4.83
Source(s) Source: Manitoba. Chief Electoral Officer (1999). Statement of Votes for the 37th Provincial General Election, September 21, 1999 (PDF) (Report). Winnipeg: Elections Manitoba.

=== 1962 ===
1962 Manitoba general election
Party	Candidate	Votes	%	±%
Progressive Conservative	Oscar Bjornson	1,740	45.23	+11.25
Liberal	John Ateah	1,264	32.86	1.00
New Democratic	John William Bracken	843	21.91	-3.58
Total valid votes		3,847	99.77	–
Rejected		9	0.23	
Eligible voters / Turnout		5,698	67.67	-3.49
Source(s) Source: Manitoba. Chief Electoral Officer (1999). Statement of Votes for the 37th Provincial General Election, September 21, 1999 (PDF) (Report). Winnipeg: Elections Manitoba.

=== 1966 ===
1966 Manitoba general election
Party	Candidate	Votes	%	±%
Progressive Conservative	Oscar Bjornson	1,342	31.73	-13.50
Liberal	James L. Desilets	1,262	29.84	-3.02
New Democratic	Walter Zarecki	1,151	27.22	5.30
Social Credit	Ruben R. Thomas	474	11.21	–
Total valid votes		4,229	–	–
Rejected		14	–	
Eligible voters / Turnout		6,398	66.32	-1.36
Source(s) Source: Manitoba. Chief Electoral Officer (1999). Statement of Votes for the 37th Provincial General Election, September 21, 1999 (PDF) (Report). Winnipeg: Elections Manitoba.

=== 1969 ===
1969 Manitoba general election
Party	Candidate	Votes	%	±%
New Democratic	Sam Uskiw	4,060	66.20	38.98
Progressive Conservative	Fred Klym	1,267	20.66	-11.07
Liberal	Al Tymko	806	13.14	-16.70
Total valid votes		6,133	–	–
Rejected		27	–	
Eligible voters / Turnout		8,948	68.84	2.52
Source(s) Source: Manitoba. Chief Electoral Officer (1999). Statement of Votes for the 37th Provincial General Election, September 21, 1999 (PDF) (Report). Winnipeg: Elections Manitoba.

=== 1973 ===
1973 Manitoba general election
Party	Candidate	Votes	%	±%
New Democratic	Sam Uskiw	5,461	70.88	4.68
Liberal	Jo Anne Hillier	2,244	29.12	15.98
Total valid votes		7,705	–	–
Rejected		40	–	
Eligible voters / Turnout		9,885	78.35	9.51
Source(s) Source: Manitoba. Chief Electoral Officer (1999). Statement of Votes for the 37th Provincial General Election, September 21, 1999 (PDF) (Report). Winnipeg: Elections Manitoba.

=== 1977 ===
1977 Manitoba general election
Party	Candidate	Votes	%	±%
New Democratic	Sam Uskiw	5,037	53.89	-16.99
Progressive Conservative	John Vaags	3,795	40.60	–
Liberal	Robert "Bob" Dyne	515	5.51	-23.61
Total valid votes		9,347	–	–
Rejected		12	–	
Eligible voters / Turnout		11,731	79.78	1.43
Source(s) Source: Manitoba. Chief Electoral Officer (1999). Statement of Votes for the 37th Provincial General Election, September 21, 1999 (PDF) (Report). Winnipeg: Elections Manitoba.

=== 1981 ===
1981 Manitoba general election
Party	Candidate	Votes	%	±%
New Democratic	Sam Uskiw	4,682	62.50	8.61
Progressive Conservative	Berton Trainor	2,809	37.50	-3.10
Total valid votes		7,491	–	–
Rejected		40	–	
Eligible voters / Turnout		10,708	70.33	-9.45
Source(s) Source: Manitoba. Chief Electoral Officer (1999). Statement of Votes for the 37th Provincial General Election, September 21, 1999 (PDF) (Report). Winnipeg: Elections Manitoba.

=== 1986 ===
1986 Manitoba general election
Party	Candidate	Votes	%	±%
New Democratic	Clarence Baker	3,903	46.12	-16.38
Progressive Conservative	Darren Praznik	3,601	42.55	5.05
Liberal	Jerry Fontaine	959	11.33	–
Total valid votes		8,463	–	–
Rejected		17	–	
Eligible voters / Turnout		11,469	73.94	3.61
New Democratic hold		Swing		
Source(s) Source: Manitoba. Chief Electoral Officer (1999). Statement of Votes for the 37th Provincial General Election, September 21, 1999 (PDF) (Report). Winnipeg: Elections Manitoba.

=== 1988 ===
1988 Manitoba general election
Party	Candidate	Votes	%	±%
Progressive Conservative	Darren Praznik	3,773	41.48	-1.07
New Democratic	Clarence Baker	2,911	32.01	-14.11
Liberal	Peter Raymond	2,411	26.51	15.18
Total valid votes		9,095	–	–
Rejected		13	–	
Eligible voters / Turnout		11,757	77.47	3.53
Source(s) Source: Manitoba. Chief Electoral Officer (1999). Statement of Votes for the 37th Provincial General Election, September 21, 1999 (PDF) (Report). Winnipeg: Elections Manitoba.

=== 1990 ===
1990 Manitoba general election
Party	Candidate	Votes	%	±%
Progressive Conservative	Darren Praznik	5,162	53.70	12.21
New Democratic	Leonard Kolton	3,142	32.68	0.68
Liberal	Frank Thibedeau	1,309	13.62	-12.89
Total valid votes		9,613	–	–
Rejected		27	–	
Eligible voters / Turnout		13,194	73.06	-4.41
Source(s) Source: Manitoba. Chief Electoral Officer (1999). Statement of Votes for the 37th Provincial General Election, September 21, 1999 (PDF) (Report). Winnipeg: Elections Manitoba.

=== 1995 ===
1995 Manitoba general election
Party	Candidate	Votes	%	±%
Progressive Conservative	Darren Praznik	5,986	57.07	3.38
New Democratic	Marguerite Ogilvie	3,463	33.02	0.33
Liberal	Bill Flett	1,039	9.91	-3.71
Total valid votes		10,488	–	–
Rejected		34	–	
Eligible voters / Turnout		13,846	75.99	2.93
Source(s) Source: Manitoba. Chief Electoral Officer (1999). Statement of Votes for the 37th Provincial General Election, September 21, 1999 (PDF) (Report). Winnipeg: Elections Manitoba.

=== 1999 ===
1999 Manitoba general election
Party	Candidate	Votes	%	±%	Expenditures
Progressive Conservative	Darren Praznik	4,835	50.78	-6.29	$26,804.49
New Democratic	Michael Hameluck	4,686	49.22	16.20	$29,666.00
Total valid votes		9,521	–	–	
Rejected		64	–		
Eligible voters / turnout		14,443	66.36	-9.63	
Source(s) Source: Manitoba. Chief Electoral Officer (1999). Statement of Votes for the 37th Provincial General Election, September 21, 1999 (PDF) (Report). Winnipeg: Elections Manitoba.

=== 2002 by-election ===
Manitoba provincial by-election, March 12, 2002 Resignation of Darren Praznik
Party	Candidate	Votes	%	±%
Progressive Conservative	Gerald Hawranik	3,398	41.04	-9.74
New Democratic	Michael "Mike" Hameluck	3,234	39.06	-10.15
Liberal	George William Harbottle	1,647	19.89	–
Total valid votes		8,279	–	–
Rejected		N/A	–	
Eligible voters / Turnout		N/A	–	–
Source(s) Source:

=== 2003 ===
2003 Manitoba general election
Party	Candidate	Votes	%	±%
Progressive Conservative	Gerald Hawranik	4,380	51.26	10.21
New Democratic	Michael Hameluck	3,875	45.35	6.29
Liberal	Cheryl Appleyard	290	3.39	-16.50
Total valid votes		8,545	–	–
Rejected		27	–	
Eligible voters / Turnout		14,164	60.52	–
Source(s) Source: Manitoba. Chief Electoral Officer (2003). Statement of Votes for the 38th Provincial General Election, June 3, 2003 (PDF) (Report). Winnipeg: Elections Manitoba.

=== 2007 ===
2007 Manitoba general election
Party	Candidate	Votes	%	±%	Expenditures
Progressive Conservative	Gerald Hawranik	4,866	59.01	7.75	$24,695.70
New Democratic	Patrick O'Connor	2,773	33.63	-11.72	$11,782.23
Liberal	Christopher Gmiterek	607	7.36	3.97	$340.29
Total valid votes		8,246	–	–	
Rejected		27	–		
Eligible voters / turnout		14,138	58.52	-2.00	
Source(s) Source: Manitoba. Chief Electoral Officer (2007). Statement of Votes for the 39th Provincial General Election, May 22, 2007 (PDF) (Report). Winnipeg: Elections Manitoba.

=== 2011 ===
2011 Manitoba general election
Party	Candidate	Votes	%	±%	Expenditures
Progressive Conservative	Wayne Ewasko	4,350	54.30	-4.71	$20,568.00
New Democratic	Elana Spence	3,087	38.53	+4.91	$13,574.10
Green	Dan Green	290	3.62	–	$1,517.95
Liberal	Charlett Millen	284	3.55	-3.82	$2,966.68
Total valid votes		8,011	–	–	
Rejected		24	–		
Eligible voters / turnout		13,844	58.04	-0.48	
Source(s) Source: Manitoba. Chief Electoral Officer (2011). Statement of Votes for the 40th Provincial General Election, October 4, 2011 (PDF) (Report). Winnipeg: Elections Manitoba. "Election Returns: 40th General Election". Elections Manitoba. 2011.

=== 2016 ===
2016 Manitoba general election
Party	Candidate	Votes	%	±%	Expenditures
Progressive Conservative	Wayne Ewasko	5,666	77.48	+23.18	$25,069.13
New Democratic	Wendy Sol	1,647	22.52	-16.01	$2,955.31
Total valid votes		7,313	–	–	
Rejected		227	–		
Eligible voters / turnout		13,729	54.92	-3.12	
Source(s) Source: Manitoba. Chief Electoral Officer (2016). Statement of Votes for the 41st Provincial General Election, April 19, 2016 (PDF) (Report). Winnipeg: Elections Manitoba. "Election Returns: 41st General Election". Elections Manitoba. 2016.

=== 2019 ===
2019 Manitoba general election
Party	Candidate	Votes	%	±%	Expenditures
Progressive Conservative	Wayne Ewasko	6,177	65.91	-11.57	$23,226.73
New Democratic	Sidney Klassen	1,814	19.36	-3.17	$1,256.85
Liberal	Terry Hayward	1,381	14.74	–	$4,507.33
Total valid votes		9,372	–	–	
Rejected		106	–		
Eligible voters / turnout		15,477	61.24	+6.32	
Source(s) Source: Manitoba. Chief Electoral Officer (2019). Statement of Votes for the 42nd Provincial General Election, September 10, 2019 (PDF) (Report). Winnipeg: Elections Manitoba. "Candidate Election Returns". Elections Manitoba. Elections Manitoba.

=== 2023 ===
2023 Manitoba general election
Party	Candidate	Votes	%	±%	Expenditures
Progressive Conservative	Wayne Ewasko	5,670	58.51	-7.40	$27,306.37
New Democratic	Kathy Majowski	3,447	35.57	+16.22	$10,975.34
Green	Blair Mahaffy	573	5.91	–	$759.06
Total valid votes/expense limit		9,690	99.13	–	$62,732.00
Total rejected and declined ballots		85	0.87	–	
Turnout		9,775	60.85	-0.39	
Eligible voters		16,064			
Progressive Conservative hold		Swing		-11.81	
Source(s) Source: Elections Manitoba

== Previous boundaries ==
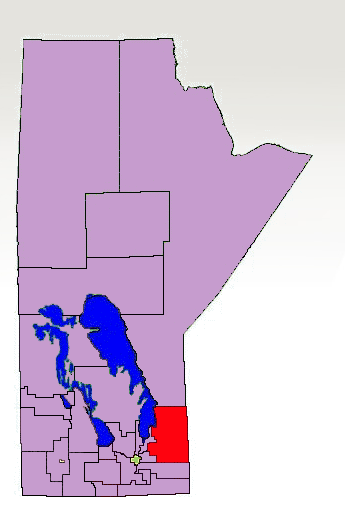
The 1998–2011 electoral boundaries for Lac du Bonnet

== See also ==
- List of Manitoba provincial electoral districts
- Canadian provincial electoral districts
