= 2014 Safeway Championship =

Men's curling tournament in Manitoba

- Host city: Winnipeg, Manitoba
- Arena: MTS Iceplex
- Dates: January 29–February 2
- Winner: Team Stoughton
- Curling club: Charleswood CC, Winnipeg
- Skip: Jeff Stoughton
- Third: Jon Mead
- Second: Reid Carruthers
- Lead: Mark Nichols
- Finalist: Mike McEwen

The 2014 Safeway Championship, Manitoba's provincial men's curling championship, was held from January 29 to February 2 at the MTS Iceplex in Winnipeg, Manitoba. The winning Jeff Stoughton team represented Manitoba at the 2014 Tim Hortons Brier in Kamloops, British Columbia. It marked Stoughton’s eleventh and final provincial championship title.

== Teams ==
The teams are listed as follows:

Skip	Third	Second	Lead	Alternate	Club
Grant Brown	Jonathan Sawatzky	Tuffy Seguin	David Schneider		Burntwood
Richard Daneault	Chris Galbraith	Braden Zawada	Mike Neufeld	Bruce Archer	Granite
Randy Dutiaume	Dave Tonnellier	Bryce McEwen	Sheldon Wettig		Thistle
Wayne Ewasko	Randal Thomas	Dave Beaudoin	Gord Stelmack	Cory Anderson	Beausejour
Rob Fowler	Allan Lyburn	Brendan Talyor	Derek Samagalski		Brandon
Graham Freeman	Allan Lawn	Kevin Barkley	Dwayne Barkley		Virden
Sean Grassie	Kody Janzen	Scott McCamis	Stu Shiells		Deer Lodge
Doug Hamblin	Kevin Hamblin	Lorne Hamblin	Doug Fisher	David Hamblin	Morris
Ryan Hyde	Farrol Asham	Kyle Einarson	Kenny Keeler	Harley Vanstone	Portage
Steve Irwin	Joey Witherspoon	Travis Taylor	Travis Saban	Terry McNamee	Brandon
Dave Johnson	Robin Nelson	Gary Shibata	Davie Priestley	David Bay	Pembina
Jared Kolomaya	Neil Kitching	Kennedy Bird	Daniel Hunt	Andrew Hunt	Stonewall
David Kraichy	Andrew Irving	Taylor McIntyre	Brad Van Walleghem		Fort Rouge
William Kuran	Kelly Marnoch	Branden Jorgensen	Chris Cameron	Evan Reynolds	Carberry
Trevor Loreth	Braid Haight	Ryan Lowden	Brett Cawson	Taren Gesell	West Kildonan
Mark Lukowich	Stu Gresham	Chris Chimuk	Kevin Wiebe		West Kildonan
William Lyburn	Alex Forrest	Connor Njegovan	Tyler Forrest	James Kirkness	Fort Rouge
Mike McEwen	B. J. Neufeld	Matt Wozniak	Denni Neufeld		Fort Rouge
Richard Muntain	Mike McCaughan	Curtis Atkins	Rodney Legault	Myron Bowerman	Pinawa
Don Nelson	Eldon Derksen	Harvey Hiebert	Dave Penner		Pembina
Randy Neufeld	Jim Coleman	A. J. Girardin	Shane Halliburton	Matt Abraham	Pembina
Glenn Parrott	Scott Gray	Cory Parrott	Grant Spraggs		Minnedosa
Scott Ramsay	Mark Taylor	Ross McFadyen	Kyle Werenich	Kevin Thompson	Granite
Justin Richter	Shawn Magnusson	Bryan Galbraith	Darcy Jacobs		Riverton
Kelly Robertson	Doug Armour	Peter Prokopowich	Bob Scales		Neepawa
Brent Scales	Gordy Hardy	Kelly Tibble	Todd Trevellyen		Swan River
Bob Sigurdson	Darren Oryniak	Al Purdy	Chad Barkman	Wayne Sigurdson	West Kildonan
Steen Sigurdson	Riley Smith	Ian McMillan	Nick Curtis	Trevor Calvert	Heather
Justin Stanus	Josh Drews	Nolan Bradshaw	Justin Twiss		Fort Rouge
Jeff Stoughton	Jon Mead	Reid Carruthers	Mark Nichols	Garth Smith	Charleswood
Greg Todoruk	Dwight Bottrell	Darcy Todoruk	Barrett Procyshyn	Jim Todoruk	Dauphin
Geoff Trimble	Jeff Stewart	Darren Pennell	Alan Christison	Dean Smith	Gladstone

== Knockout Brackets ==
32 team double knockout with playoff round
Four teams qualify each from A Event and B Event

=== A Event ===
First Knockout	Qualifier 1
Graham Freeman	2
Kelly Robertson	10
Kelly Robertson	4
Mike McEwen	10
Mike McEwen	10
Glenn Parrott	2
Mike McEwen	7
Steen Sigurdson	4
Dave Johnson	2
Steen Sigurdson	8
Steen Sigurdson	7
Bob Sigurdson	6
Bob Sigurdson	8
Justin Richter	3

First Knockout	Qualifier 2
Doug Hamblin	1
Richard Daneault	6
Richard Daneault	7
Scott Ramsay	4
Scott Ramsay	8
Don Nelson	3
Richard Daneault	2
Rob Fowler	4
Geoff Trimble	4
Rob Fowler	7
Rob Fowler	9
Richard Muntain	5
Jared Kolomaya	4
Richard Muntain	8

First Knockout	Qualifier 3
Mark Lukowich	2
Randy Neufeld	9
Randy Neufeld	10
Greg Todoruk	7
Sean Grassie	5
Greg Todoruk	6
Randy Neufeld	6
William Lyburn	8
Justin Stanus	5
William Lyburn	7
William Lyburn	6
William Kuran	3
William Kuran	9
Trevor Loreth	6

First Knockout	Qualifier 4
Brent Scales	4
Randy Dutiaume	8
Randy Dutiaume	1
Jeff Stoughton	6
Jeff Stoughton	8
Grant Brown	1
Jeff Stoughton	6
Steve Irwin	3
Wayne Ewasko	3
David Kraichy	6
David Kraichy	4
Steve Irwin	7
Steve Irwin	7
Ryan Hyde	4

=== B Event ===
Second Knockout	Qualifier 5
Bob Sigurdson	5
Graham Freeman	11	Graham Freeman	7	Steen Sigurdson	7
Glenn Parrott	4	Graham Freeman	5	Justin Richter	4
Justin Richter	6
Kelly Robertson	7
Dave Johnson	2	Justin Richter	8
Justin Richter	7

Second Knockout	Qualifier 6
Richard Muntain	5
Doug Hamblin	9	Doug Hamblin	2	Richard Daneault	2
Don Nelson	7	Richard Muntain	9	Richard Muntain	8
Jared Kolomaya	7
Scott Ramsay	2
Geoff Trimble	4	Jared Kolomaya	7
Jared Kolomaya	7

Second Knockout	Qualifier 7
William Kuran	3
Mark Lukowich	3	Sean Grassie	7	Randy Neufeld	8
Sean Grassie	8	Sean Grassie	6	Trevor Loreth	6
Trevor Loreth	7
Greg Todoruk	4
Justin Stanus	8	Trevor Loreth	10
Trevor Loreth	9

Second Knockout	Qualifier 8
David Kraichy	6
Brent Scales	9	Brent Scales	4	Steve Irwin	6
Grant Brown	1	David Kraichy	7	David Kraichy	3
Ryan Hyde	5
Randy Dutiaume	3
Wayne Ewasko	2	Ryan Hyde	8
Ryan Hyde	7

== Knockout Results ==
All draws are listed in Central Standard Time (UTC−6).

=== Draw 1 ===
Thursday, January 29, 8:30 am

Sheet A	1	2	3	4	5	6	7	8	9	10	Final
Graham Freeman	0	2	0	0	0	X	X	X	X	X	2
Kelly Robertson	5	0	1	3	1	X	X	X	X	X	10

Sheet B	1	2	3	4	5	6	7	8	9	10	Final
Mike McEwen	0	2	0	1	0	3	2	2	X	X	10
Glenn Parrott	0	0	1	0	1	0	0	0	X	X	2

Sheet C	1	2	3	4	5	6	7	8	9	10	Final
Dave Johnson	0	0	0	0	0	0	2	0	X	X	2
Steen Sigurdson	0	3	0	1	0	1	0	3	X	X	8

Sheet D	1	2	3	4	5	6	7	8	9	10	Final
Bob Sigurdson	0	0	2	1	1	0	3	1	X	X	8
Justin Richter	0	1	0	0	0	2	0	0	X	X	3

Sheet E	1	2	3	4	5	6	7	8	9	10	Final
Doug Hamblin	0	0	0	1	0	0	0	0	X	X	1
Richard Daneault	1	0	0	0	4	0	0	1	X	X	6

=== Draw 2 ===
Thursday, January 29, 12:15 pm

Sheet A	1	2	3	4	5	6	7	8	9	10	Final
Scott Ramsay	0	2	1	0	0	2	3	X	X	X	8
Don Nelson	0	0	0	2	1	0	0	X	X	X	3

Sheet B	1	2	3	4	5	6	7	8	9	10	Final
Geoff Trimble	0	1	0	1	0	1	0	1	0	X	4
Rob Fowler	1	0	1	0	2	0	1	0	2	X	7

Sheet C	1	2	3	4	5	6	7	8	9	10	Final
Jared Kolomaya	0	1	0	0	0	1	0	2	0	X	4
Richard Muntain	0	0	1	2	1	0	3	0	1	X	8

Sheet D	1	2	3	4	5	6	7	8	9	10	Final
Mark Lukowich	0	0	0	1	0	1	X	X	X	X	2
Randy Neufeld	2	1	1	0	5	0	X	X	X	X	9

Sheet E	1	2	3	4	5	6	7	8	9	10	11	Final
Sean Grassie	1	0	2	0	0	0	0	0	1	1	0	5
Greg Todoruk	0	2	0	0	0	0	0	3	0	0	1	6

=== Draw 3 ===
Thursday, January 29, 4:00 pm

Sheet A	1	2	3	4	5	6	7	8	9	10	Final
Justin Stanus	1	0	1	0	1	0	0	0	2	0	5
William Lyburn	0	2	0	2	0	1	1	0	0	1	7

Sheet B	1	2	3	4	5	6	7	8	9	10	Final
William Kuran	0	0	0	0	2	0	0	2	3	2	9
Trevor Loreth	1	1	1	1	0	0	2	0	0	0	6

Sheet C	1	2	3	4	5	6	7	8	9	10	Final
Brent Scales	0	2	0	0	1	0	1	0	X	X	4
Randy Dutiaume	1	0	2	3	0	1	0	1	X	X	8

Sheet D	1	2	3	4	5	6	7	8	9	10	Final
Jeff Stoughton	1	1	2	4	0	X	X	X	X	X	8
Grant Brown	0	0	0	0	1	X	X	X	X	X	1

Sheet E	1	2	3	4	5	6	7	8	9	10	Final
Wayne Ewasko	0	1	0	0	0	1	0	1	0	X	3
David Kraichy	1	0	2	1	1	0	0	0	1	X	6

=== Draw 4 ===
Thursday, January 29, 8:15 pm

Sheet A	1	2	3	4	5	6	7	8	9	10	Final
Steve Irwin	1	0	1	2	0	0	1	1	0	1	7
Ryan Hyde	0	1	0	0	0	1	0	0	2	0	4

Sheet B	1	2	3	4	5	6	7	8	9	10	Final
Graham Freeman	1	0	2	2	1	0	3	2	X	X	11
Glenn Parrott	0	2	0	0	0	2	0	0	X	X	4

Sheet C	1	2	3	4	5	6	7	8	9	10	Final
Dave Johnson	0	0	0	0	0	1	1	0	X	X	2
Justin Richter	0	1	0	3	1	0	0	2	X	X	7

Sheet D	1	2	3	4	5	6	7	8	9	10	Final
Doug Hamblin	2	0	2	0	0	2	0	1	0	2	9
Don Nelson	0	1	0	2	1	0	2	0	1	0	7

Sheet E	1	2	3	4	5	6	7	8	9	10	Final
Geoff Trimble	0	1	0	1	0	0	2	0	0	X	4
Jared Kolomaya	0	0	2	0	1	0	0	2	2	X	7

=== Draw 5 ===
Friday, January 30, 8:30 am

Sheet A	1	2	3	4	5	6	7	8	9	10	Final
Rob Fowler	0	0	0	2	2	0	3	0	2	X	9
Richard Muntain	1	1	1	0	0	1	0	1	0	X	5

Sheet B	1	2	3	4	5	6	7	8	9	10	Final
Randy Neufeld	0	3	0	1	1	0	1	0	4	X	10
Greg Todoruk	3	0	2	0	0	1	0	1	0	X	7

Sheet C	1	2	3	4	5	6	7	8	9	10	Final
William Lyburn	1	0	1	0	3	1	0	X	X	X	6
William Kuran	0	1	0	1	0	0	1	X	X	X	3

Sheet D	1	2	3	4	5	6	7	8	9	10	Final
Mark Lukowich	0	0	0	0	1	0	2	0	0	X	3
Sean Grassie	0	1	2	2	0	1	0	1	1	X	8

Sheet E	1	2	3	4	5	6	7	8	9	10	Final
Justin Stanus	0	0	2	0	2	0	3	0	1	0	8
Trevor Loreth	1	1	0	3	0	1	0	1	0	2	9

=== Draw 6 ===
Friday, January 30, 12:15 pm

Sheet A	1	2	3	4	5	6	7	8	9	10	Final
Kelly Robertson	0	0	0	2	1	0	1	0	X	X	4
Mike McEwen	1	0	1	0	0	3	0	5	X	X	10

Sheet B	1	2	3	4	5	6	7	8	9	10	Final
Steen Sigurdson	0	0	3	0	1	0	0	2	0	1	7
Bob Sigurdson	0	1	0	2	0	0	2	0	1	0	6

Sheet C	1	2	3	4	5	6	7	8	9	10	Final
Richard Daneault	0	0	0	0	2	0	1	1	0	3	7
Scott Ramsay	2	0	0	0	0	1	0	0	1	0	4

Sheet D	1	2	3	4	5	6	7	8	9	10	Final
Randy Dutiaume	0	0	0	0	1	X	X	X	X	X	1
Jeff Stoughton	1	1	2	2	0	X	X	X	X	X	6

Sheet E	1	2	3	4	5	6	7	8	9	10	Final
David Kraichy	0	2	0	0	1	0	0	0	1	X	4
Steve Irwin	0	0	3	0	0	2	0	2	0	X	7

=== Draw 7 ===
Friday, January 30, 4:00 pm

Sheet A	1	2	3	4	5	6	7	8	9	10	Final
Brent Scales	4	3	0	1	1	X	X	X	X	X	9
Grant Brown	0	0	1	0	0	X	X	X	X	X	1

Sheet B	1	2	3	4	5	6	7	8	9	10	Final
Wayne Ewasko	0	1	0	0	1	0	0	0	X	X	2
Ryan Hyde	0	0	3	1	0	1	1	1	X	X	7

Sheet C	1	2	3	4	5	6	7	8	9	10	Final
Doug Hamblin	1	0	0	0	0	0	1	0	0	X	2
Richard Muntain	0	0	1	0	1	0	0	2	1	X	5

Sheet D	1	2	3	4	5	6	7	8	9	10	Final
Sean Grassie	2	0	0	2	0	2	1	0	0	X	7
William Kuran	0	1	0	0	1	0	0	1	0	X	3

Sheet E	1	2	3	4	5	6	7	8	9	10	Final
Trevor Loreth	3	0	3	0	1	0	2	1	X	X	10
Greg Todoruk	0	1	0	1	0	2	0	0	X	X	4

=== Draw 8 ===
Friday, January 30, 7:45 pm

Sheet A	1	2	3	4	5	6	7	8	9	10	Final
Graham Freeman	2	0	0	0	0	0	2	0	2	1	7
Bob Sigurdson	0	1	1	0	1	0	0	2	0	0	5

Sheet B	1	2	3	4	5	6	7	8	9	10	Final
Justin Richter	4	0	1	0	1	0	0	0	2	0	8
Kelly Robertson	0	2	0	1	0	1	1	1	0	1	7

Sheet C	1	2	3	4	5	6	7	8	9	10	Final
Jared Kolomaya	0	2	0	2	1	0	1	1	X	X	7
Scott Ramsay	1	0	1	0	0	0	0	0	X	X	2

Sheet D	1	2	3	4	5	6	7	8	9	10	Final
Brent Scales	0	1	0	0	0	1	1	0	1	X	4
David Kraichy	1	0	0	1	2	0	0	2	0	X	6

Sheet E	1	2	3	4	5	6	7	8	9	10	Final
Ryan Hyde	1	0	1	3	0	3	X	X	X	X	8
Randy Dutiaume	0	1	0	0	2	0	X	X	X	X	3

=== Draw 9 ===
Saturday, January 31, 8:30 am

Team	1	2	3	4	5	6	7	8	9	10	Final
Mike McEwen	1	0	0	2	0	1	0	2	0	1	7
Steen Sigurdson	0	2	0	0	1	0	1	0	0	0	4

Team	1	2	3	4	5	6	7	8	9	10	Final
Richard Daneault	0	1	1	0	0	0	0	0	0	X	2
Rob Fowler	1	0	0	2	1	0	0	0	0	X	4

Team	1	2	3	4	5	6	7	8	9	10	Final
Randy Neufeld	2	0	2	0	1	0	1	0	0	X	6
William Lyburn	0	1	0	3	0	3	0	1	0	X	8

Team	1	2	3	4	5	6	7	8	9	10	Final
Jeff Stoughton	1	1	0	0	2	1	0	0	1	X	6
Steve Irwin	0	0	1	0	0	0	2	0	0	X	3

=== Draw 10 ===
Saturday, January 31, 12:15 pm

Team	1	2	3	4	5	6	7	8	9	10	Final
Graham Freeman	0	1	0	1	0	1	0	1	1	0	5
Justin Richter	1	0	0	0	2	0	1	0	0	2	6

Team	1	2	3	4	5	6	7	8	9	10	Final
Richard Muntain	1	0	0	4	0	0	2	0	1	1	9
Jared Kolomaya	1	0	1	0	2	2	0	1	0	0	7

Team	1	2	3	4	5	6	7	8	9	10	Final
Sean Grassie	2	1	0	1	0	0	0	0	2	X	6
Trevor Loreth	0	0	1	0	1	0	1	4	0	X	7

Team	1	2	3	4	5	6	7	8	9	10	Final
David Kraichy	1	0	0	2	0	3	0	1	0	X	7
Ryan Hyde	0	1	1	0	1	0	1	0	1	X	5

=== Draw 11 ===
Saturday, January 31, 4:00 pm

Team	1	2	3	4	5	6	7	8	9	10	Final
Justin Richter	0	0	1	0	0	2	0	1	0	X	4
Steen Sigurdson	0	1	0	2	2	0	1	0	1	X	7

Team	1	2	3	4	5	6	7	8	9	10	Final
Richard Muntain	0	2	0	0	2	3	1	X	X	X	8
Richard Daneault	0	0	1	1	0	0	0	X	X	X	2

Team	1	2	3	4	5	6	7	8	9	10	11	Final
Trevor Loreth	2	0	1	0	0	0	1	1	1	0	0	6
Randy Neufeld	0	1	0	1	1	1	0	0	0	2	2	8

Team	1	2	3	4	5	6	7	8	9	10	Final
David Kraichy	0	0	1	0	1	1	0	0	0	X	3
Steve Irwin	1	1	0	1	0	0	0	2	1	X	6

== Playoff Brackets ==
8 team double knockout
Four teams qualify into Championship Round

=== A event ===
First Knockout
Q1	Mike McEwen	10
Q6	Richard Muntain	4
Q2	Rob Fowler	6
Q5	Steen Sigurdson	4

Qualifier 1
Q1	Mike McEwen	9
Q2	Rob Fowler	4

First Knockout
Q3	William Lyburn	6
Q8	Steve Irwin	4
Q4	Jeff Stoughton	8
Q7	Randy Neufeld	6

Qualifier 2
Q3	William Lyburn	3
Q4	Jeff Stoughton	6

=== B event ===
Second Knockout			Qualifier 3
			Q3	William Lyburn	8
Q6	Richard Muntain	6	Q6	Richard Muntain	3
Q5	Steen Sigurdson	3

Second Knockout			Qualifier 4
			Q2	Rob Fowler	4
Q8	Steve Irwin	8	Q8	Steve Irwin	8
Q7	Randy Neufeld	7

== Playoff Results ==
=== Draw 12 ===
Friday, January 31, 7:45 pm

Team	1	2	3	4	5	6	7	8	9	10	Final
Mike McEwen	0	2	2	0	3	0	3	X	X	X	10
Richard Muntain	1	0	0	1	0	2	0	X	X	X	4

Team	1	2	3	4	5	6	7	8	9	10	Final
Rob Fowler	2	1	0	0	1	0	0	0	1	1	6
Steen Sigurdson	0	0	0	1	0	2	0	1	0	0	4

Team	1	2	3	4	5	6	7	8	9	10	Final
William Lyburn	0	0	2	0	2	0	2	0	0	X	6
Steve Irwin	0	0	0	2	0	1	0	0	1	X	4

Team	1	2	3	4	5	6	7	8	9	10	Final
Jeff Stoughton	0	0	2	0	3	0	0	2	0	1	8
Randy Neufeld	0	0	0	2	0	2	1	0	1	0	6

=== Draw 13 ===
Saturday, February 1, 9:00 am

Team	1	2	3	4	5	6	7	8	9	10	Final
Mike McEwen	2	0	0	2	0	3	0	0	2	X	9
Rob Fowler	0	0	2	0	1	0	1	0	0	X	4

Team	1	2	3	4	5	6	7	8	9	10	Final
William Lyburn	0	0	0	1	0	1	0	1	X	X	3
Jeff Stoughton	0	3	0	0	2	0	1	0	X	X	6

Team	1	2	3	4	5	6	7	8	9	10	Final
Richard Muntain	0	3	1	0	0	0	1	0	1	0	6
Steen Sigurdson	0	0	0	0	0	1	0	1	0	1	3

Team	1	2	3	4	5	6	7	8	9	10	Final
Steve Irwin	0	2	0	1	0	1	0	1	0	3	8
Randy Neufeld	1	0	2	0	1	0	1	0	2	0	7

=== Draw 14 ===
Saturday, February 1, 2:00 pm

Team	1	2	3	4	5	6	7	8	9	10	Final
William Lyburn	1	0	2	0	1	0	2	2	X	X	8
Richard Muntain	0	1	0	1	0	1	0	0	X	X	3

Team	1	2	3	4	5	6	7	8	9	10	Final
Rob Fowler	0	1	0	0	0	0	1	0	2	0	4
Steve Irwin	2	0	0	1	1	0	0	1	0	3	8

== Championship Round ==
Page playoff system
1	Mike McEwen	5
2	Jeff Stoughton	9
3	William Lyburn	9
4	Steve Irwin	8

Semifinal
1	Mike McEwen	6
3	William Lyburn	4

Final
2	Jeff Stoughton	8
1	Mike McEwen	3

=== 1 vs. 2 ===
Saturday, February 1, 6:00 pm

Team	1	2	3	4	5	6	7	8	9	10	Final
Mike McEwen	0	2	0	2	0	0	0	1	X	X	5
Jeff Stoughton	2	0	1	0	2	1	3	0	X	X	9

=== 3 vs. 4 ===
Saturday, February 1, 6:00 pm

Team	1	2	3	4	5	6	7	8	9	10	Final
William Lyburn	1	0	1	1	1	0	0	4	0	1	9
Steve Irwin	0	4	0	0	0	2	0	0	2	0	8

=== Semifinal ===
Sunday, February 2, 9:30 am

Team	1	2	3	4	5	6	7	8	9	10	Final
Mike McEwen	0	2	1	0	1	1	0	0	0	1	6
William Lyburn	1	0	0	2	0	0	1	0	0	0	4

=== Final ===
Sunday, February 2, 2:00 pm

Team	1	2	3	4	5	6	7	8	9	10	Final
Jeff Stoughton 🔨	3	0	0	2	0	0	0	3	X	X	8
Mike McEwen	0	1	0	0	1	0	1	0	X	X	3

2014 Safeway Championship

Jeff Stoughton
11th Manitoba Provincial Championship title
