= Jessie Saulteaux =

Canadian Assiniboine elder and theological leader

Jessie Prettyshield Saulteaux (1912 – May 10, 1995) was a Canadian Assiniboine elder and theological leader.

Early in life, Saulteaux desired to become a nurse, but she was unable to do so due to reasons of race. Instead she turned her talents towards helping her community, the Carry-the-Kettle First Nation, and her church. She was among the first women in Saskatchewan to be elected tribal chief; she also supported the development of ministers and church leaders from the First Nations community. She participated in the founding of the All Native Circle Conference in the United Church of Canada, and the establishment of a theological college for indigenous people. The latter was named the Dr. Jessie Saulteaux Resource Center in 1984, the year after she received a doctor of divinity degree from St. Andrew's College, Saskatoon. The Resource Center merged with the Francis Sandy Theological Centre, named for an Ojibwa lay minister and elder, in 2016, becoming the Sandy-Saulteaux Spiritual Centre.
