= Donald A. Ross =

Canadian politician (1857–1937)

Donald Andrew Ross (April 10, 1857 – January 23, 1937) was a realtor, farmer and politician in Manitoba, Canada. He served in the Legislative Assembly of Manitoba from 1907 to 1920 and again from 1922 to 1927.

== Early life and education ==
Ross was born in Nairn, in Middlesex County, Ontario, the son of Donald Ross and Margaret Halbert. His grandfather was part of Duke Wellington's body guard at Waterloo, and was an escort to Napoleon Bonaparte on his exile to St. Helena. Ross was educated at Nairn Public School.

== Career ==
Ross moved to Manitoba in 1874 where he worked on the first telegraph line. In 1877, he established a real estate business. Ross served on the Winnipeg City Council for eight years, the Winnipeg School Board for twenty-three years, and the Winnipeg Public Parks Board for eleven years. In 1880, he married Margaret McIvor.

Ross first campaigned for the Manitoba legislature in the 1903 provincial election. He ran as an independent candidate in Springfield, and finished third against candidates of the Conservative and Liberal parties. In the 1907 election, he won the Liberal nomination and defeated Conservative candidate John Little by 181 votes. The Conservatives won this election, and Ross served on the opposition benches.

Ross was re-elected for Springfield in the 1910 election. In the 1914 election, he was returned for the redistributed constituency of St. Clements. In the 1915 campaign, he won election as an independent Liberal. The Liberals won a landslide majority in 1915, and Ross supported Tobias Norris's government in the legislature between 1915 and 1920. He lost his seat to Labour candidate Matthew Stanbridge in the election of 1920.

Ross was re-elected as an independent in the 1922 provincial election, defeating Stanbridge and two other candidates. He served as an opposition member for five years, and lost to Progressive candidate Robert Hoey in the 1927 election. The Liberals did not run candidates against Ross in either 1922 or 1927, and he may have remained informally aligned with the party in this period.

== Death ==
Ross died in Winnipeg at the age of 79.
