= Gerald Hawranik =

Canadian lawyer and politician

Member of the Legislative Assembly of Manitoba for Lac du Bonnet
- In office March 12, 2002 – March 25, 2011
- Preceded by: Darren Praznik
- Succeeded by: Wayne Ewasko

Personal details
- Party: Progressive Conservative
- Education: University of Manitoba
- Occupation: Lawyer, politician

Gerald Hawranik is a lawyer and former politician in Manitoba, Canada. He was a member of the Manitoba legislature from 2002 to 2011. Hawranik studied at the University of Manitoba, earning degrees in law, education and physical education. He was a long-time resident of northeastern Manitoba. He has been a practicing lawyer for over 30 years, and has also been the co-owner of a general insurance agency and an automobile dealership in the area. During the early 1990s, he and his wife were responsible for opening the first rural food bank in Canada in the region. Hawranik is also the founder of Beauserve Homes, Inc., a learning facility for mentally challenged adults.

In 1993, he was named Queen's Counsel.

Hawranik was first elected to the legislature in a 2002 by-election in the riding of Lac du Bonnet (following the resignation of Darren Praznik). A Progressive Conservative, Hawranik narrowly defeated New Democrat Michael Hameluck by 3,398 votes to 3,234. He defeated Hameluck again by a slightly wider margin in the provincial election of 2003.

Hawranik maintains a personal web page, through which he has outlined his views on a variety of issues. He has spoken out in favour of reforming Canada's legal system, particularly in light of efforts by the Hells Angels to hire high-priced lawyers at public expense.

He was re-elected in the 2007 provincial election.

In February 2011, Hawranik announced that he would not run for reelection to the assembly later that year. Later in 2011, he moved to Alberta to join his wife who had been serving as dean of the faculty of graduate studies at Athabasca University for the previous two years. Also in 2011, he was named to the Parole Board of Canada. In July 2013, he was named chair and CEO of the Alberta Surface Rights and Land Compensation Board.
