= Darren Praznik =

Canadian politician

Member of the Manitoba Legislative Assembly for Lac du Bonnet
- In office 1988–2002
- Preceded by: Clarence Baker
- Succeeded by: Gerald Hawranik

Personal details
- Born: May 9, 1961 (age 64) Selkirk, Manitoba, Canada
- Party: University of Winnipeg; University of Manitoba
- Profession: lawyer

Darren Thomas Praznik (born May 9, 1961) is a politician in Manitoba, Canada. He was a cabinet minister in the Progressive Conservative government of Gary Filmon, and considered running for the party's leadership in 2000.

Praznik was born in Selkirk, Manitoba, and attended the University of Winnipeg and the University of Manitoba. He was called to the Manitoba bar in 1986, and worked as a barrister and solicitor. He also joined the Board of Directors on the Manitoba Oil and Gas Corporation (for one term), and was a special assistant to the federal Health minister between 1986 and 1988.

Praznik first ran for the Legislative Assembly of Manitoba in the 1986 general election, in the rural northeastern riding of Lac du Bonnet. He was defeated by Clarence Baker of the New Democratic Party, 3903 votes to 3601.

Praznik was elected for Lac du Bonnet in the 1988 general election (defeating Baker by over 800 votes), and was soon named legislative assistant to Gary Filmon, the newly elected Premier.

Praznik was re-elected in the 1990 election and was promoted to Minister of Labour, a position that he held until 1995. He held several other portfolios in the Filmon government, including Minister of Northern Affairs (1993–1997), Minister of Energy and Mines (1995–1997), Minister of Health (1997–1999), and Minister of Highways and Transportation and Government House Leader (February to October 1999). As Health Minister, Praznik presided over a number of cutbacks in government funding, but was also responsible for expanding the government's home care delivery system.

Filmon's Tories were defeated by Gary Doer's New Democrats in the 1999 election, and Praznik moved into the opposition. He considered running against Stuart Murray for the party's leadership in 2000, but left the race well before the convention took place. Murray was subsequently elected without opposition.

Praznik resigned from the legislature in 2002 to become executive director of government relations with the Canadian Blood Services. In 2007, he became president and CEO of the Canadian Cosmetic, Toiletry and Fragrance Association.
