= Thomas Bunn (Manitoba politician) =

Canadian Metis politician, 1830–1875

- Born: May 16, 1830; Red River Colony, Canada
- Died: April 11, 1875 (aged 44); St. Clements, Manitoba
- Occupation: Politician

The Hon. Thomas Bunn (16 May 1830 – 11 April 1875) was a Métis legislator, lawyer, negotiator, landowner, farmer, clerk of the court, and politician in Manitoba. He represented St. Clements from 1870 to 1874 in the Legislative Assembly of Manitoba. He helped usher in the Manitoba Act. He was Secretary of State in the Legislative Assembly of Assiniboia until it was overthrown by the John A. Macdonald government and dissolved eight months after it began. Thomas Bunn was English-Metis to Louis Riel's French, and the two men didn't always agree but were staunch in their resolve to protect the rights of the Metis people. Thomas Bunn made the first motion in the Assembly of Assiniboia.

== Personal life ==
Thomas Bunn was born on 16 May 1830 in the Red River Colony. He was the oldest son of Catherine Thomas, the daughter of an HBC governor who went to Hudson Bay as a surgeon in 1789; and John Bunn, a judge, surgeon, coroner, and politician who started his career as an Edinburgh trained surgeon and "filled numerous public offices with distinction and proved that fine judges need not be lawyers." (“Law, Life, and Government at Red River, Vol. 2, General Quarterly.) The British Medical Association paid homage to John Bunn 70 years after his death.

In 1854, Bunn moved to the Rural Municipality of St. Andrews and married Isabella Clouston, who died in 1857; the pair had two children. Bunn married again, in 1859, to Rachel Harriot and they had eight children. Two years later, he resettled in Mapleton. He was a farmer throughout his time in the Red River Colony. He was a member of the Church of England and a Freemason. Bunn died on 11 April 1875. A road in St. Andrew's was named after Bunn and his former residence has been declared a provincial heritage site.

== Public career ==
Bunn was a clerk for the Council and Quarterly Court of Assiniboia from 1865 to 1869 and was then appointed to the council in January 1868. He became council's executive officer on 17 December 1869 and remained as such until the council was dissolved in 1870.

Thomas Bunn chaired an open-air meeting of approximately 500 Red River citizens in minus twenty degree weather, so that all could listen to Donald Alexander Smith, an emissary of Canada to the Red River Colony, on 19 and 20 January 1870.

Following the meeting, a committee was formed to organize the election of a convention to negotiate with the Canadian government. Bunn was named to that committee and, in the subsequent election, was made the English-speaking delegate of the Rural Municipality of St. Clements (now Mapleton) to the Provisional Government of Manitoba. He held that post until 24 June 1870. The convention worked from 27 January to 3 February 1870 and created the Provisional Government, whose head of state, Louis Riel, named Bunn as secretary of state.

Thomas Bunn made the first motion in the Assembly of Assiniboia.

"That the Government of England, the Canadian Government, and the Hudson Bay Company, have ignored our rights as British subjects, when they entered into arrangements on the subject of the transfer of the Government of the North- West to the Dominion of Canada; without consulting the wishes of the people of the North-West Territory."

Thomas Bunn and two others recorded in a journal what they personally considered to be most interesting or important during the sessions of the Legislative Assembly of Assiniboia Debates.

Canadian military forces under Colonel Garnet Wolseley reached Fort Garry on 24 August 1870 and deposed the Provisional Government. Bunn survived the fall of the Provisional Government and began studying law. He was elected in December 1870 to the Legislative Assembly of Manitoba in the province's first general election and called to the bar in 1871. Bunn was made a clerk for Manitoba's First General Quarterly Court on 16 May 1871.
