= 1969 New Democratic Party of Manitoba leadership election =

- Date: June 7, 1969
- Convention: Winnipeg, Manitoba
- Resigning leader: Russell Paulley
- Won by: Edward Schreyer
- Ballots: 1
- Candidates: 2

The 1969 New Democratic Party of Manitoba leadership election was held on June 7, 1969 to choose a successor to outgoing leader Russell Paulley. There were two candidates for the party leadership: Edward Schreyer and Sidney Green. The contest was expected to be close, but Schreyer won a convincing victory on a strength of a powerful nomination speech. The final tally was 506 votes for Schreyer, against 177 for Green.
