= John Beresford Allan =

Canadian politician

John Beresford Allan (November 9, 1841 – October 9, 1927) was an Irish-born soldier, businessman and political figure in Manitoba. He represented St. Clements from 1883 to 1886 in the Legislative Assembly of Manitoba as a Conservative.

He was born in Armagh, the son of John Beresford Allan, and came to Montreal with his family in 1850. Allan joined the Victoria Rifles in 1861. He served during the American Civil War and, in 1866, took part in the defence against the Fenian raids. In 1870, he came to the Red River Settlement with the Wolseley Expedition. He married Margaret Sinclair in 1871. Allan joined the North-West Mounted Police in 1874 and was stationed at Fort Walsh. He served during the North-West Rebellion.

He ran unsuccessfully in the provincial riding of St. Andrews in 1877 before being elected for St. Clements in 1883.

Around 1897, Allan inherited a fortune and retired from the mounted police. He became a land investor in Winnipeg and was president of the Canadian West Land Company.

Allan died in Vancouver, British Columbia at the age of 85 and was buried in Burnaby.
