= Wilbert Doneleyko =

Canadian politician (1913–1990)

Wilbert George Doneleyko (February 13, 1913 – January 27, 1990), last name also spelled Doneley, was a politician in Manitoba, Canada.

Born in Rossburn, Manitoba, he was educated there and worked for the Manitoba Co-operative Honey Producers Limited as a warehouse manager. Doneleyko served in the Legislative Assembly of Manitoba from 1945 to 1949 as a member of the Co-operative Commonwealth Federation. He was defeated by Nicholas Stryk when he ran for reelection in 1949 as an independent. He was expelled from the CCF caucus for publicly opposing NATO activities in Europe. In 1945, Doneleyko ran unsuccessfully as a CCF candidate for the Springfield seat in the Canadian House of Commons.

He died in Victoria, British Columbia in 1990 at the age of 76. He had been suffering from chronic lymphocytic leukemia, nephrotic syndrome and renal failure.
