= Brokenhead (electoral district) =

Former provincial electoral district in Manitoba, Canada

Manitoba electoral district

Defunct provincial electoral district
- Legislature: Legislative Assembly of Manitoba
- District created: 1958
- District abolished: 1969
- First contested: 1958
- Last contested: 1966

Brokenhead was a provincial electoral division in the Canadian province of Manitoba. It was created by redistribution in 1957 from part of Winnipeg North, and formally came into existence in the provincial election of 1958. The electoral district was last contested in the 1966 Manitoba general election, after which it was abolished.

== Electoral results ==
This riding has elected the following members of the Legislative Assembly of Manitoba:

=== 1958 ===
1958 Manitoba general election
Party	Candidate	Votes	%
Co-operative Commonwealth	Edward Schreyer	1,474	37.06
Liberal–Progressive	Fred Helwer	930	23.38
Progressive Conservative	Howard Wachal	729	18.33
Independent	Stanley Copp	641	16.12
Social Credit	John William Gross	203	5.10
Total valid votes		3,977	–
Rejected		33	–
Eligible voters / Turnout		6,505	61.64
Source(s) Source: Manitoba. Chief Electoral Officer (1999). Statement of Votes for the 37th Provincial General Election, September 21, 1999 (PDF) (Report). Winnipeg: Elections Manitoba.

=== 1959 ===
1959 Manitoba general election
Party	Candidate	Votes	%	±%
Co-operative Commonwealth	Edward Schreyer	2,017	44.73	7.67
Progressive Conservative	Gordon B. Burnett	1,409	31.25	12.92
Liberal–Progressive	A. A. Trapp	1,083	24.02	0.63
Total valid votes		4,509	–	–
Rejected		27	–	
Eligible voters / Turnout		6,537	69.39	7.74
Source(s) Source: Manitoba. Chief Electoral Officer (1999). Statement of Votes for the 37th Provincial General Election, September 21, 1999 (PDF) (Report). Winnipeg: Elections Manitoba.

=== 1962 ===
1962 Manitoba general election
Party	Candidate	Votes	%	±%
New Democratic	Edward Schreyer	1,910	45.53	0.80
Progressive Conservative	Dirk Gilbert "Dick" Mulder	1,314	31.32	0.07
Liberal	Max Dubas	971	23.15	-0.87
Total valid votes		4,195	–	–
Rejected		37	–	
Eligible voters / Turnout		6,515	64.96	-4.43
Source(s) Source: Manitoba. Chief Electoral Officer (1999). Statement of Votes for the 37th Provincial General Election, September 21, 1999 (PDF) (Report). Winnipeg: Elections Manitoba.

=== 1966 ===
1966 Manitoba general election
Party	Candidate	Votes	%	±%
New Democratic	Sam Uskiw	1,889	44.57	-0.96
Progressive Conservative	George Mulder	1,315	31.03	-0.29
Independent Liberal	Stanley Copp	669	15.79	–
Social Credit	Ken Skiba	365	8.61	–
Total valid votes		4,238	–	–
Rejected		17	–	
Eligible voters / Turnout		6,675	63.75	-1.21
Source(s) Source: Manitoba. Chief Electoral Officer (1999). Statement of Votes for the 37th Provincial General Election, September 21, 1999 (PDF) (Report). Winnipeg: Elections Manitoba.
