= Wayne Ewasko =

Canadian politician

Wayne Ewasko MLA
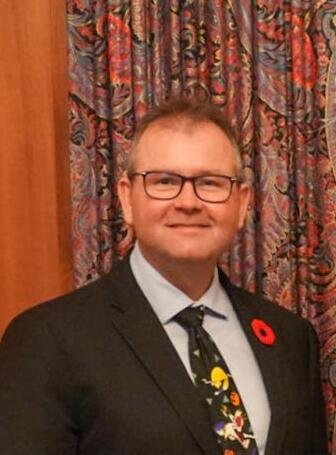

Leader of the Opposition in Manitoba
- In office January 18, 2024 – April 26, 2025
- Preceded by: Heather Stefanson
- Succeeded by: Obby Khan

Interim Leader of the Progressive Conservative Party of Manitoba
- In office January 18, 2024 – April 26, 2025
- Preceded by: Heather Stefanson
- Succeeded by: Obby Khan

Minister of Education and Early Childhood Learning
- In office January 18, 2022 – October 18, 2023
- Premier: Heather Stefanson
- Preceded by: Cliff Cullen
- Succeeded by: Nello Altomare

Minister of Advanced Education, Skills, and Immigration
- In office January 5, 2021 – January 18, 2022
- Premier: Brian Pallister; Kelvin Goertzen; Heather Stefanson
- Preceded by: Portfolio created
- Succeeded by: Jon Reyes

Member of the Legislative Assembly of Manitoba for Lac du Bonnet
- Incumbent
- Assumed office October 4, 2011
- Preceded by: Gerald Hawranik

Personal details
- Born: 1971 or 1972 (age 54–55)
- Party: Progressive Conservative
- Education: University of Manitoba (BEd)
- Occupation: Teacher; curler

Wayne Ewasko (born 1971 or 1972) is a Canadian politician, who was elected to the Legislative Assembly of Manitoba in the 2011 election.

He represents the electoral district of Lac du Bonnet as a member of the Manitoba Progressive Conservative Party caucus. He was re-elected in the 2016, 2019, and 2023 provincial elections. He served in the cabinets of Brian Pallister, Kelvin Goertzen and Heather Stefanson as the Minister of Advanced Education, Skills, and Immigration from 2021 to 2022 and then as Minister of Education and Early Childhood Learning from 2022 until the PC government's defeat in the 2023 Manitoba general election.

On October 24, 2023, he was appointed as the Shadow Minister for Education and Early Childhood Learning. On January 18, 2024, he was named interim leader of the Progressive Conservative Party following the resignation of Heather Stefanson. As interim leader, he apologized in March 2025 for PC campaign ads in the 2023 election that promoted their decision not to search for two victims' bodies in the 2022 Winnipeg serial killings.

== Electoral record ==
2023 Manitoba general election: Lac du Bonnet
Party	Candidate	Votes	%	±%	Expenditures
Progressive Conservative	Wayne Ewasko	5,670	58.51	-7.40	$27,306.37
New Democratic	Kathy Majowski	3,447	35.57	+16.22	$10,975.34
Green	Blair Mahaffy	573	5.91	–	$759.06
Total valid votes/expense limit		9,690	99.13	–	$62,732.00
Total rejected and declined ballots		85	0.87	–	
Turnout		9,775	60.85	-0.39	
Eligible voters		16,064			
Progressive Conservative hold		Swing		-11.81	
Source(s) Source: Elections Manitoba

2019 Manitoba general election: Lac du Bonnet
Party	Candidate	Votes	%	±%	Expenditures
Progressive Conservative	Wayne Ewasko	6,177	65.91	-11.57	$23,226.73
New Democratic	Sidney Klassen	1,814	19.36	-3.17	$1,256.85
Liberal	Terry Hayward	1,381	14.74	–	$4,507.33
Total valid votes		9,372	–	–	
Rejected		106	–		
Eligible voters / turnout		15,477	61.24	+6.32	
Source(s) Source: Manitoba. Chief Electoral Officer (2019). Statement of Votes for the 42nd Provincial General Election, September 10, 2019 (PDF) (Report). Winnipeg: Elections Manitoba. "Candidate Election Returns". Elections Manitoba. Elections Manitoba.

2016 Manitoba general election: Lac du Bonnet
Party	Candidate	Votes	%	±%	Expenditures
Progressive Conservative	Wayne Ewasko	5,666	77.48	+23.18	$25,069.13
New Democratic	Wendy Sol	1,647	22.52	-16.01	$2,955.31
Total valid votes		7,313	–	–	
Rejected		227	–		
Eligible voters / turnout		13,729	54.92	-3.12	
Source(s) Source: Manitoba. Chief Electoral Officer (2016). Statement of Votes for the 41st Provincial General Election, April 19, 2016 (PDF) (Report). Winnipeg: Elections Manitoba. "Election Returns: 41st General Election". Elections Manitoba. 2016.

2011 Manitoba general election: Lac du Bonnet
Party	Candidate	Votes	%	±%	Expenditures
Progressive Conservative	Wayne Ewasko	4,350	54.30	-4.71	$20,568.00
New Democratic	Elana Spence	3,087	38.53	+4.91	$13,574.10
Green	Dan Green	290	3.62	–	$1,517.95
Liberal	Charlett Millen	284	3.55	-3.82	$2,966.68
Total valid votes		8,011	–	–	
Rejected		24	–		
Eligible voters / turnout		13,844	58.04	-0.48	
Source(s) Source: Manitoba. Chief Electoral Officer (2011). Statement of Votes for the 40th Provincial General Election, October 4, 2011 (PDF) (Report). Winnipeg: Elections Manitoba. "Election Returns: 40th General Election". Elections Manitoba. 2011.

== Personal life ==
Ewasko is noteworthy as both a politician and a curler having previously been to the 2006, 2009, 2010, 2013, 2014 and 2017 provincial championships.
