= Robert Hoey =

Canadian politician (1883–1965)

Robert Alexander Hoey (September 12, 1883 – November 15, 1965) was a politician in Manitoba, Canada. He was a member of the House of Commons of Canada from 1921 to 1925, served in the Legislative Assembly of Manitoba from 1927 to 1936, and was a cabinet minister in the government of John Bracken.

Hoey was born in Enniskillen, County Fermanagh, Ireland, and came to Canada in 1909. He was educated at Wesley College and Manitoba College in Winnipeg and became a pioneer worker in the farmer's movement. He served as provincial director of the United Farmers of Manitoba (UFM) in 1918, and worked as the UFM's field secretary from 1919 to 1921.

He was elected to the House of Commons in Canada's federal election of 1921 as a Progressive candidate, defeating Liberal candidate Thomas Molloy by 1,397 votes in the riding of Springfield. He served on the opposition benches of parliament for the next four years, and did not seek re-election in 1925. He returned to farm organization after leaving the House of Commons in 1925, taking part in the organization of the Western Wheat Pools.

The United Farmers of Manitoba unexpectedly won a government majority in the 1922 provincial election, and formed government as the Progressive Party of Manitoba. Hoey was asked to become Premier of Manitoba but declined. John Bracken was then selected in his place.

On April 28, 1927, Hoey joined Bracken's provincial government as Minister of Education. He did not hold a seat in the legislature at the time but was a prominent campaigner for the Progressive Party in the 1927 provincial election, and defeated independent incumbent Donald A. Ross by 710 votes in the St. Clements constituency. He was easily returned in the 1932 election and served as Minister of Education until the end of his nine-year tenure in the legislature. He also served as acting Attorney General from February 22 to May 18, 1929.

In 1932, Hoey played a prominent role in negotiations between Manitoba's Progressive and Liberal parties, which resulted in a Liberal-Progressive electoral alliance. The alliance eventually became a permanent partnership, and government members became known as "Liberal-Progressives."

Hoey was defeated in the 1936 provincial election, losing to Independent Labour Party candidate Herbert Sulkers by 665 votes.

After his electoral defeat in 1936, he became Superintendent of Welfare and Training in the Indian Affairs Branch of the federal Department of Mines and Resources. He served in that position until March 1945, when he became Director of the Indian Affairs Branch, a position that he held until 1948.

Hoey was appointed to a seat on the Northwest Territories Council in 1946, and served to 1951.
