= Bob Davie (ice hockey) =

Canadian ice hockey player (1912–1990)

- Born: September 12, 1912; Beausejour, Manitoba, Canada
- Died: October 27, 1990 (aged 78)
- Height: 6 ft 0 in (183 cm)
- Weight: 170 lb (77 kg; 12 st 2 lb)
- Position: Defence
- Shot: Right
- Played for: Boston Bruins
- Playing career: 1932–1941

Robert Howard "Pinkie" Davie (September 12, 1912 in Beausejour, Manitoba – October 27, 1990) was a Canadian professional ice hockey defenceman who played 41 games in the National Hockey League with the Boston Bruins in the mid 1930s.

== Career statistics ==
=== Regular season and playoffs ===
			Regular season					Playoffs
Season	Team	League	GP	G	A	Pts	PIM	GP	G	A	Pts	PIM
1930–31	Winnipeg Monarchs	WJrHL	1	0	0	0	2	4	1	0	1	0
1931–32	Winnipeg Monarchs	WJrHL	12	1	2	3	36	4	1	0	1	4
1931–32	Winnipeg Monarchs	M-Cup	—	—	—	—	—	8	2	1	3	8
1932–33	Boston Cubs	Can-Am	46	4	7	11	70	7	1	3	4	4
1933–34	Boston Bruins	NHL	9	0	0	0	6	9	1	4	5	4
1933–34	Boston Cubs	Can-Am	33	6	8	14	47	5	0	1	1	11
1934–35	Boston Bruins	NHL	30	0	1	1	17	—	—	—	—	—
1934–35	Boston Cubs	Can-Am	19	3	5	8	16	—	—	—	—	—
1935–36	Boston Bruins	NHL	2	0	0	0	2	—	—	—	—	—
1935–36	Boston Cubs	Can-Am	23	2	8	10	29	—	—	—	—	—
1935–36	Springfield Indians	Can-Am	6	0	0	0	8	—	—	—	—	—
1936–37	Minneapolis Millers	AHA	44	9	8	17	51	6	2	3	5	6
1937–38	Minneapolis Millers	AHA	10	1	3	4	10	—	—	—	—	—
1937–38	Springfield Indians	IAHL	37	2	4	6	59	—	—	—	—	—
1940–41	Dauphin Dolphins	MIHA	—	—	—	—	—	7	2	2	4	6
Can-Am totals			127	15	28	43	170	12	1	4	5	15
NHL totals			41	0	1	1	25	—	—	—	—	—
