= Herbert Sulkers =

Canadian politician

Herbert Sulkers (September 25, 1889—October 16, 1948) was a politician in Manitoba, Canada. He served in the Legislative Assembly of Manitoba from 1936 to 1941, as a representative of the Cooperative Commonwealth Federation (CCF).

Sulkers was born in Amsterdam, the Netherlands, and received his early education in that city. He came to Canada in 1907, and continued his education in Winnipeg. Sulkers worked as a florist, and was president of the Manitoba Vegetable Growers Association. From 1924 to 1936, he served as a school trustee. In 1912, he married Gertrude Bergman. Sulkers also served as president of the Manitoba Sugar Beet Growers' Association.

In the 1935 federal election, Sulkers ran as a candidate of the federal Cooperative Commonwealth Federation in Springfield. He finished a close second against Liberal candidate John Mouat Turner.

Sulkers was elected to the Manitoba legislature in the 1936 provincial election, in which the CCF ran a joint campaign with the provincial Independent Labour Party (ILP). He defeated Liberal-Progressive cabinet minister Robert Hoey by 665 votes.

The CCF entered an all-party coalition government in 1940, and Sulkers briefly served as a government backbencher. He was defeated by Liberal-Progressive candidate Nicholas Stryk in the 1941 provincial election.

He died at home in Winnipeg at the age of 59.
