= Edward Schreyer =

Canadian politician, diplomat, and statesman (born 1935)

The Right Honourable Edward Schreyer PC CC CMM OM CD
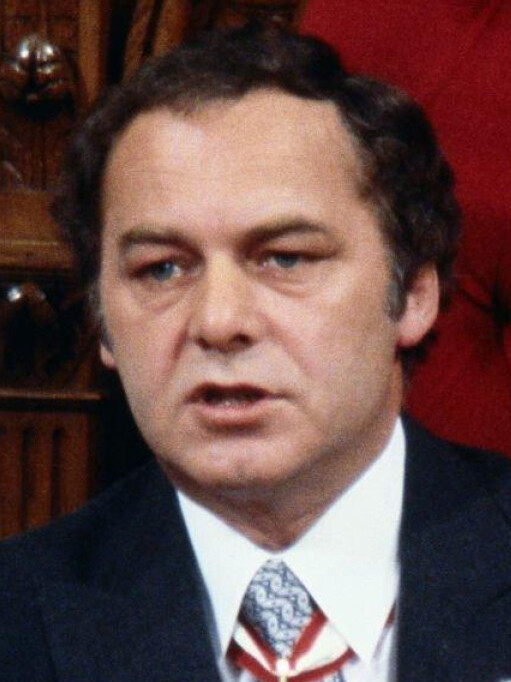
- Schreyer delivering the speech from the throne on April 14, 1980

22nd Governor General of Canada
- In office January 22, 1979 – May 14, 1984
- Monarch: Elizabeth II
- Prime Minister: Pierre Trudeau; Joe Clark
- Preceded by: Jules Léger
- Succeeded by: Jeanne Sauvé

16th Premier of Manitoba
- In office July 15, 1969 – October 24, 1977
- Monarch: Elizabeth II
- Lieutenant Governor: Richard S. Bowles; William J. McKeag; Francis L. Jobin
- Preceded by: Walter Weir
- Succeeded by: Sterling Lyon

More...

Personal details
- Born: Edward Richard Schreyer; December 21, 1935 (age 90) Beausejour, Manitoba, Canada
- Party: New Democratic
- Spouse: Lily Schreyer (m. 1960)
- Children: 4
- Education: University of Manitoba (BA, BEd, MA)
- Profession: Politician; diplomat; statesman; educator; academic

Edward Richard Schreyer (born December 21, 1935; /ˈʃraɪər/) is a Canadian politician, diplomat, and statesman who served as the 22nd governor general of Canada from 1979 to 1984. He previously served as the 16th premier of Manitoba from 1969 to 1977.

Schreyer was born and educated in Manitoba, and was first elected to the province's legislative assembly in 1958. He later moved into federal politics, winning a seat in the House of Commons, but returned to Manitoba in 1969 to become leader of the provincial New Democratic Party (NDP). The party then won that year's provincial election and Schreyer became the 16th premier of Manitoba, aged 33. In 1978 he was appointed Governor General by Queen Elizabeth II on the recommendation of Prime Minister Pierre Trudeau, to replace Jules Léger, and he occupied the post until succeeded by Jeanne Sauvé in 1984. As the Queen's representative, he was praised for raising the stature of Ukrainian Canadians. Later, he served as Canada's High Commissioner to Australia, Papua New Guinea, the Solomon Islands, and Vanuatu. He then attempted, without success, to get elected to the House of Commons; he was the first person to run for election in Canada after serving as Governor General.

== Early life and youth ==
Schreyer was born in Beausejour, Manitoba, to Anglophone ethnic German-Austrian Catholic parents John Schreyer and Elizabeth Gottfried; his maternal grandparents were Austrians who emigrated from western Ukraine. Schreyer attended Cromwell Elementary School and Beausejour Collegiate Secondary School, then United College and St. John's College at the University of Manitoba. There, he received a Bachelor of Pedagogy in 1959, a Bachelor of Education in 1962, a Master of Arts in International Relations, and a second Master of Arts in Economics in 1963. From 1962 to 1965, Schreyer served as a professor of International Relations at St. Paul's College.

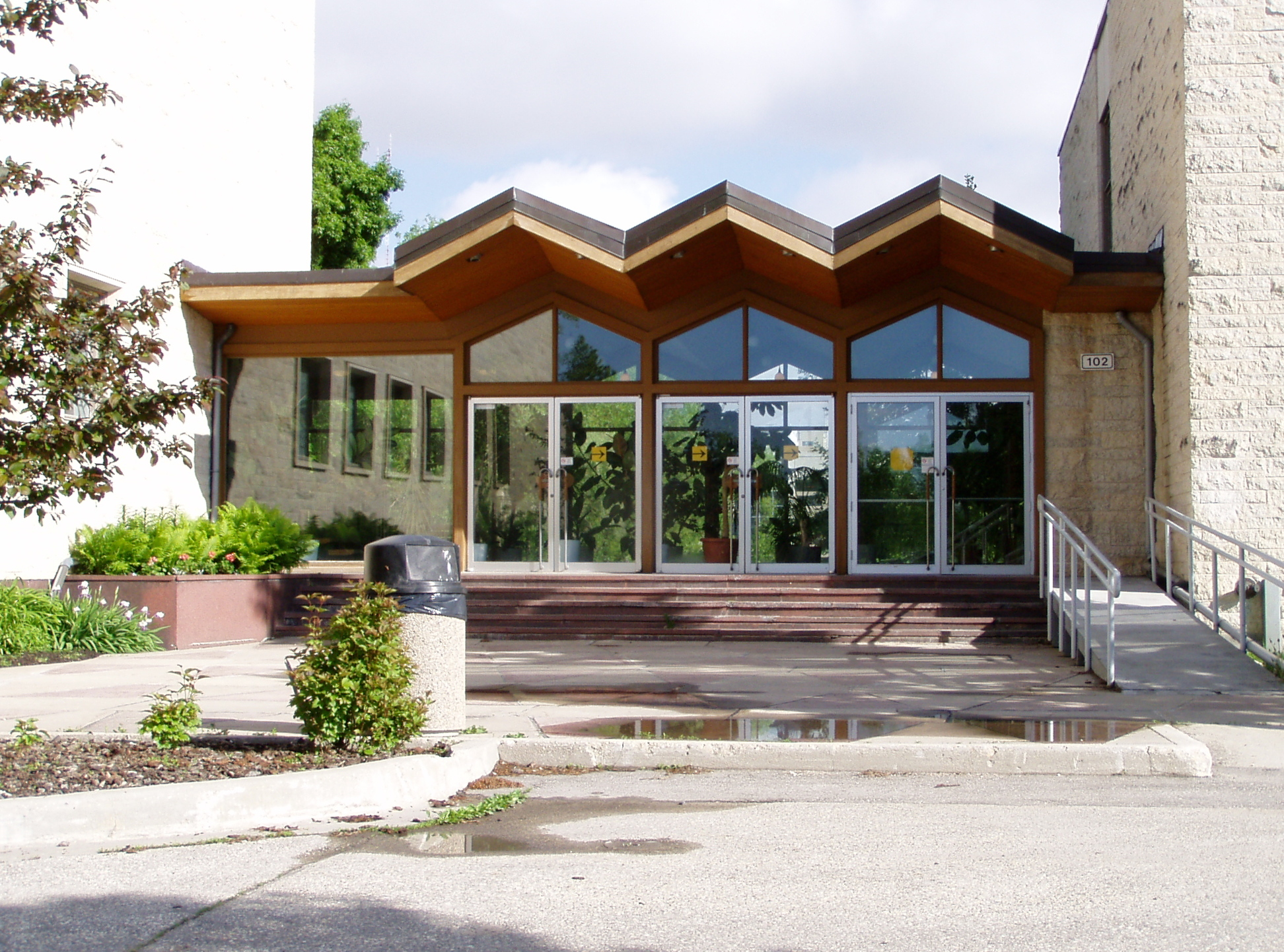
St. John's College, University of Manitoba, where Schreyer obtained four degrees

While pursuing his post-graduate degrees, Schreyer married Lily Schultz, with whom he had two daughters, Lisa and Karmel, and two sons, Jason and Toban.

== Political career ==
In the Manitoba election of 1958, Schreyer was elected to the legislative assembly as a member of the Co-operative Commonwealth Federation (CCF), in the rural constituency of Brokenhead; at twenty-two years of age, Schreyer was the youngest person ever elected to the assembly. He held the riding until resigning in 1965 to run successfully for the House of Commons in Ottawa. He returned to provincial politics in 1969, and was on June 8 elected leader of the New Democratic Party of Manitoba (NDP), the successor to the Manitoba CCF. He differed in some ways from the previous leaders of Manitoba's NDP: he came from a rural background and was not committed to socialism as an ideology; he won the support of many centrist voters who had not previously identified with the party. Also, he was the first leader of the Manitoba CCF/NDP who was not of British and Protestant descent.

Schreyer led his party to a watershed showing in the 1969 provincial election. The NDP picked up 17 seats, vaulting them from third place in the legislature to first place. Schreyer himself returned to the legislature from the newly created north Winnipeg seat of Rossmere.

However, with 28 seats, the NDP was one seat short of a majority. Initially, the Liberals and Progressive Conservatives considered forming a coalition to lock the NDP out of power. Finally, Liberal Laurent Desjardins threw his support to Schreyer (and later joined the NDP after a period as an independent), making Schreyer the first social democratic premier in Manitoba's history.

Schreyer's premiership oversaw the amalgamation of the city of Winnipeg with its suburbs, introduced public automobile insurance, and significantly reduced medicare premiums. Re-elected in 1973, Schreyer maintained his position as premier, though the council was this time less innovative, the only policy of note being the mining tax legislation implemented in 1974. Schreyer also served as his own minister of finance between 1972 and 1975, and as the minister responsible for Manitoba Hydro from 1971 to 1977. It was from those positions that Schreyer advised the Lieutenant Governor to authorise construction of hydroelectric works instead of coal and gas burning electricity generators, and also put forward legislation that simultaneously eliminated provincial health care premiums and implemented home care and pharmacare. Schreyer sometimes favoured policies different from those of the federal NDP; in 1970, he supported Prime Minister Pierre Trudeau's invocation of the War Measures Act in response to the October Crisis, despite the opposition of federal NDP leader Tommy Douglas.

In the 1977 provincial election, Schreyer's New Democrats were defeated by the Progressive Conservative Party under Sterling Lyon. He remained leader of the NDP in opposition until 1979, when Trudeau offered him the office of Governor General.

Commenting on the social impact that Schreyer's premiership had on Manitoba, one study has noted how

The Schreyer government undertook to provide types of services to people in the northern part of the province which people in the south took for granted. Largely through the vehicle of the new Department of Northern Affairs, the government extended the range of public goods in the north — particularly through the provision of basic services and manpower training - to a degree which it would not or could not match in the south. It provided school milk programs, recreation, housing, and service centres in some northern communities. It participated in the direct ownership of businesses at the local level, helped to establish and operate cooperatives, and assisted small community development through crown corporations and partnerships with local entrepreneurs. All of these programs consisted of welfare measures, providing financial benefits and services to people who otherwise could not afford them.

== Governor General of Canada ==
On December 28, 1978, Queen Elizabeth II, by commission under the royal sign-manual and Great Seal of Canada, appointed Pierre Trudeau's choice of Schreyer to succeed Jules Léger as the Queen's representative. He was sworn in during a ceremony in the Senate chamber on January 22, 1979, making him the first Governor General from Manitoba, and, at the age of 43, the third youngest ever appointed, after the Marquess of Lorne in 1878 (33 years old), and the Marquess of Lansdowne in 1883 (38 years old).

As Governor General, Schreyer championed women's issues, the environment, and official bilingualism. During his first year in office, he established the Governor General's Award in Commemoration of the Persons Case, to recognize the efforts of Emily Murphy and others to ensure that Canadian women would be constitutionally recognized as persons. In 1981 he instituted the Governor General's Conservation Awards and in 1983 he created the Edward Schreyer Fellowship in Ukrainian Studies at the University of Toronto. Also in 1983, he presided over the first Governor General's Canadian Study Conference, which has since been held every four years. Schreyer invested Terry Fox as a companion of the Order of Canada, travelling to Port Coquitlam, British Columbia, to present Fox with the order's insignia. In 1980, he caused controversy when he hesitated to call an election after Prime Minister Joe Clark advised him to do so. Schreyer also later suggested that he might have dissolved parliament at any point through 1981 and 1982, had the Prime Minister Pierre Trudeau tried to impose his constitutional proposals unilaterally.

Schreyer's wish to connect with people in an open, friendly way conflicted with the "stiff, earnest public manner" expected of the Governor General, and he was thus a target of the media. When Jeanne Sauvé succeeded him, Maclean's writer Carol Goar compared Sauvé to Schreyer's performance, stating that "she is expected to restore grace and refinement to Government House after five years of Edward Schreyer's earnest Prairie populism and lacklustre reign."

== Post viceregal career ==
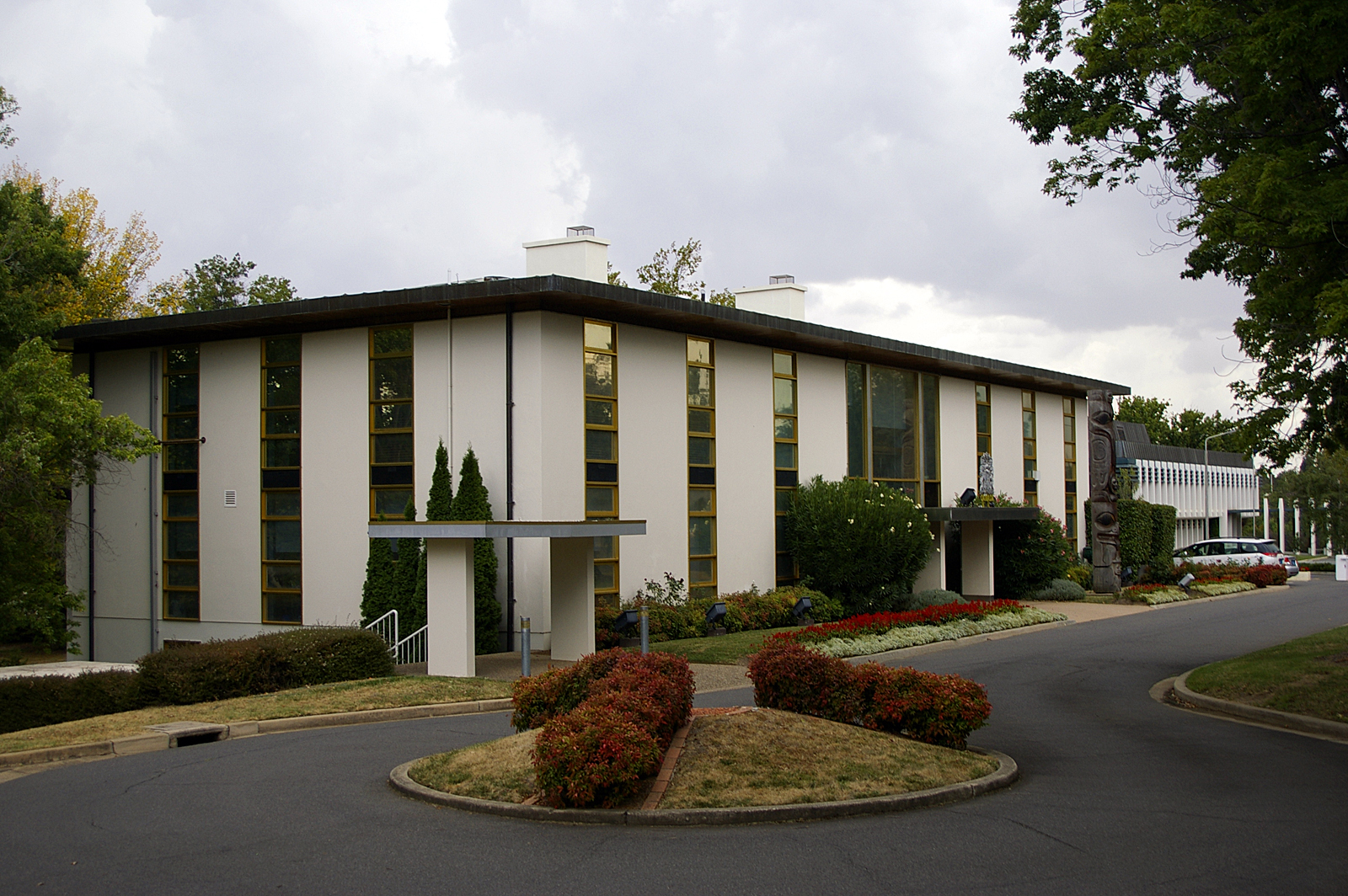
The High Commission of Canada in Australia, where Schreyer served as High Commissioner to Australia between 1984 and 1988

Upon retirement from the post of Governor General in 1984, Schreyer announced that he would donate his pension to the environmental Canadian Shield Foundation; unlike other former viceroys, he intended to remain in political and diplomatic life. On the same day he ceased to be Governor General, he was appointed by his successor to the office of High Commissioner to Australia, Papua New Guinea, the Solomon Islands, and Vanuatu for Her Majesty's Government in Canada. He held those positions until 1988, when he returned to Winnipeg.

On returning to Canada, Schreyer was employed as a national representative of Habitat for Humanity, an honorary director of the Sierra Legal Defence Fund, and an honorary advisor to the Canadian Foundation for the Preservation of Chinese Cultural and Historical Treasures. He was also a founding member of the Winnipeg Library Foundation. Starting in 1989, he acted as a guest professor at universities around North America and Europe, lecturing on matters relating to resource geography, energy economics, and environmental impact. On November 1, 2002, Schreyer was appointed the Chancellor of Brandon University and was re-elected to the position in early 2005 for a term that ended on October 31, 2008.

=== Political return ===
Schreyer, then 70 years old, ran in the 2006 federal election as the NDP candidate in the riding of Selkirk—Interlake. It was the first time a former Governor General sought election to the Canadian House of Commons; previously, former Lieutenant Governors had been called to the Senate to sit as party members, and some former Governors General who hailed from the United Kingdom returned there to sit with party affiliations in the House of Lords, sometimes even serving in cabinet. (Note: In 1952, the Earl Alexander of Tunis resigned as Governor General of Canada to accept an appointment as Minister of Defence in the British Cabinet chaired by Winston Churchill. The Marquess of Lansdowne and The Duke of Devonshire both served in British Cabinets following their viceregal careers; Lansdowne also went on to serve for over a decade as leader of the Conservative Party in the House of Lords.) Schreyer lost to Conservative incumbent James Bezan, receiving 37% of the vote to Bezan's 49%. Earlier comments Schreyer had made describing homosexuality as an "affliction" were raised by his opponents in the campaign, as the NDP supported same-sex marriage. While campaigning in 2005, Schreyer said he supported same-sex marriage as the existing legislation did not force religious institutions to marry same-sex couples.

Schreyer also waded into the federal parliamentary dispute of 2008-09, in which the opposition parties threatened to revoke their confidence in the sitting prime minister, Stephen Harper. Schreyer said: "Any group that presumes to govern must be willing to face and seek the confidence of Parliament, and it mustn't be evaded and it mustn't be long avoided. I can't put it any more succinctly than that... I must come back to your use of the words, 'to duck a confidence vote'... that must simply not be allowed to happen."

His son, Jason Schreyer, was a Winnipeg city councillor from 2014 until his death in 2025 at the age of 57.

== Titles, styles, honours, and arms ==
=== Titles ===
- July 15, 1969 – November 24, 1977: The Honourable Edward Schreyer
- January 22, 1979 – February 18, 1988: His Excellency the Right Honourable Edward Schreyer
- February 18, 1988 – : The Right Honourable Edward Schreyer

=== Honours ===
==== Ribbon bars of Edward Schreyer ====

Appointments

- January 22, 1979 – May 14, 1984: Chancellor and Principal Companion of the Order of Canada (CC)
  - May 14, 1984 – May 8, 2013: Companion of the Order of Canada (CC)
  - May 8, 2013 –: Extraordinary Companion of the Order of Canada (CC)
- (Canada) January 22, 1979 – May 14, 1984: Chancellor and Commander of the Order of Military Merit (CMM)
  - May 14, 1984 – May 8, 2013: Commander of the Order of Military Merit (CMM)
  - May 8, 2013 –: Extraordinary Commander of the Order of Military Merit (CMM)
- January 22, 1979 – May 14, 1984: Knight of Justice, Prior, and Chief Officer in Canada of the Most Venerable Order of the Hospital of Saint John of Jerusalem (KStJ)
  - May 14, 1984 – : Knight of Justice of the Most Venerable Order of the Hospital of Saint John of Jerusalem (KStJ)
- January 22, 1979 – May 14, 1984: Chief Scout of Canada
- 1979 – : Honorary Member of the Royal Military College of Canada Club
- June 3, 1984 – : Member of the Queen's Privy Council for Canada (PC)
- July 13, 2000 – : Member of the Order of Manitoba (OM)

Medals

- (Canada) January 22, 1979: Canadian Forces' Decoration (CD)
- (Canada) 1967: Canadian Centennial Medal
- (Canada) 1977: Queen Elizabeth II Silver Jubilee Medal
- 1992: Commemorative Medal for the 125th Anniversary of the Confederation of Canada
- (Canada) 2002: Queen Elizabeth II Golden Jubilee Medal
- (Canada) 2012: Queen Elizabeth II Diamond Jubilee Medal

Awards

- (Canada) 1975: Governor General Vanier Award as an Outstanding Young Canadian of the Year

==== Honorary military appointments ====
- (Canada) January 22, 1979 – May 14, 1984: Colonel of the Governor General's Horse Guards
- (Canada) January 22, 1979 – May 14, 1984: Colonel of the Governor General's Foot Guards
- (Canada) January 22, 1979 – May 14, 1984: Colonel of the Canadian Grenadier Guards

==== Honorific eponyms ====
- Manitoba: Edward Schreyer International Student Bursary, Brandon University, Brandon
- Ontario: Edward Schreyer Fellowship, University of Toronto, Toronto

=== Arms ===
Coat of arms of Edward Schreyer
Notes As Schreyer served as governor general prior to the establishment of the Canadian Heraldic Authority, he was not granted a coat of arms until 1988, though this was based on a 1980 design by Bruce W. Beatty. Unlike the arms for subsequent governors general, Schreyer's does not include the ribbon and insignia of the Order of Canada. Adopted June 4, 1988 Crest Upon a helmet mantled Vert doubled Or on a wreath Or and Vert a mound of ice proper thereon a polar bear charged with a maple leaf Gules Escutcheon Per pale Or and Vert a pale wavy of four Azure and Argent in chief a plate displaying a cross Gules charged with the Royal Crown proper; in dexter base a pomeis charged with a garb Or and in sinister base a bezant charged with a fir tree Vert Supporters Dexter a Bison proper charged on the shoulder with a lozenge Or bearing a prairie crocus flower slipped and leaved proper sinister a moose proper charged on the shoulder with a hurt displaying a fleur de lys Or the whole set upon a compartment party per pale a wheatfield Or and a forest Vert Compartment A mound set dexter with conifers Vert, sinister with base tapissé of wheat Or Motto FREEDOM EGALITÉ JUSTICE • ARBEIT ЗНАННЯ DIGNITA (Freedom Equality Justice • Work Knowledge Dignity) Orders Order of Canada - Companion (CC) Symbolism The bison is derived from the shield of the coat of arms of Manitoba, where Schreyer was born and raised, while the moose is inspired by the Coat of arms of Ontario, and the fir tree represents that province's northern forests; Schreyer lived in this province when serving in Ottawa as a member of parliament, and later, as viceroy. The prairie crocus flower on the bison's collar is also found on Manitoba's coat of arms and represents the prairies, as does the wheat sheaf. The polar bear is symbolic of Canada's north, where Schreyer often travelled while he was governor general, and is a place suceptable to environmental changes, which Schreyer sought to minimise. The wavy lines symbolise the Brokenhead River, which flows near Schreyer's home town of Beausejour, as well as the Assiniboine River, which runs through Winnipeg, where Schreyer was located during his premiership of Manitoba; to the left of this division are the symbols of Manitoba (which lies to the west), and to the right are the symbols of Ontario (which lies to the east). The disc bearing a red cross is the emblem of the Anglican Church of Canada, upon which is the royal crown, representing Schreyer's service as the sovereign's representative.

== See also ==
- List of premiers of Manitoba
- List of Manitobans
- List of Canadian university leaders

== Notes ==
Government offices
Preceded by Jules Léger	Governor General of Canada; January 22, 1979 – May 14, 1984	Succeeded by Jeanne Sauvé
Political offices
Manitoba provincial government of Edward Schreyer
Preceded by Walter Weir	Premier of Manitoba; July 15, 1969 – October 24, 1977	Succeeded by Sterling Lyon
Parliament of Canada
Preceded by Eric Stefanson, Sr.	Member of Parliament for Selkirk; June 25, 1968 – June 25, 1969	Succeeded by Doug Rowland
Preceded by Joe Slogan	Member of Parliament for Springfield; November 8, 1965 – June 25, 1968	Succeeded by Electoral district abolished
Legislative Assembly of Manitoba
Preceded by New electoral district	Member of the Legislative Assembly of Manitoba for Rossmere; June 25, 1969 – January 22, 1979	Succeeded by Vic Schroeder
Preceded by New electoral district	Member of the Legislative Assembly of Manitoba for Brokenhead; June 16, 1958 – November 8, 1965	Succeeded by Sam Uskiw
Diplomatic posts
Preceded by Raymond Cecil Anderson	Canadian High Commissioner to Australia, Papua New Guinea, the Solomon Islands, and Vanuatu; May 14, 1984 – February 18, 1988	Succeeded by Robert Kilpatrick
Academic offices
Preceded by Kevin Kavanagh	Chancellor of Brandon University; November 1, 2002 – October 31, 2008	Succeeded by Henry Champ
Order of precedence
Preceded by Richard Wagner as chief justice of Canada	Canadian order of precedence	Succeeded by Adrienne Clarkson as former governor general
