= Sam Uskiw =

Canadian politician (1933-2011)

Samuel Uskiw (October 18, 1933 in East Selkirk, Manitoba – March 19, 2011) was a politician and political fundraiser in Manitoba, Canada. He was a New Democratic member of the Legislative Assembly of Manitoba from 1966 to 1986, and served as a cabinet minister in the governments of Edward Schreyer and Howard Pawley. Subsequently, he left the New Democrats and became a fundraiser for their leading rival, the Progressive Conservative Party.

After completing his education, Uskiw worked in Winnipeg briefly before moving to Ontario where he worked on a farm in Ingersoll and then worked for the Toronto, Hamilton and Buffalo Railway. He returned to Manitoba in 1953, working as a potato farmer and meat cutter as well as selling insurance before entering political life, and served as a Junior President of the Manitoba Farmers Union in 1961-1962. He was also a school trustee from 1959 to 1965. In 1964, Uskiw married Olga Bilyk.

He was first elected to the Manitoba legislature in the provincial election of 1966, replacing Edward Schreyer (who had left for the House of Commons of Canada) in the rural riding of Brokenhead. He was easily re-elected in the redistributed riding of Lac Du Bonnet in the 1969 election, by which time Schreyer had returned to provincial politics to lead the NDP to its first-ever election victory. Uskiw supported Scheyer over Sidney Green in the leadership convention which preceded the election.

Uskiw served as Minister of Agriculture from July 15, 1969, to October 24, 1977, the entirety of Schreyer's tenure in office. He also served as Minister of Cooperative Development from May 6, 1971, to December 23, 1974. Some have argued that Schreyer tried to forestall Uskiw's leadership ambitions by keeping him in the same ministry for several years.

As Agriculture Minister, Uskiw was responsible for overseeing several initiatives and subsidy programs. He argued that rural taxation was disproportionately high, and favoured shifting education taxes from land to homeownership. He also brought forward legislation to provide for a publicly owned land system to relieve farmers of the burden of investment (this was an optional, not a mandatory program). Although the NDP made some minor rural gains in the 1973 election, however, the party's core support remained urban. Uskiw himself was easily re-elected in the 1973 election, and in the election of 1977, in which the Schreyer government lost power to the Tories under Sterling Lyon.

In early 1979, Uskiw supported Sidney Green's attempt to become the party's interim leader following Schreyer's resignation. He declined to run for the leadership himself later in the year, despite efforts by supporters such as Herb Schulz and Harry Shafransky to mobilize a candidacy. He also refused to endorse the successful campaign of Howard Pawley, despite the fact that he and Pawley had been allies in the Schreyer ministry. Uskiw was uncomfortable with the direction of the party under Pawley's leadership, particularly as regards its increased ties to the labour movement.

In 1981, there was considerable speculation that Uskiw would leave the NDP to join Green's new Progressive Party, thereby giving them official party status in the legislature. He ultimately refused, and claimed that he would try to change the NDP's policies from within. While he did not leave the NDP, he expressed his disapproval of the party's leftward turn under Pawley at several public forums.

Uskiw was re-elected in the election of 1981, in which the NDP under Pawley formed a majority government. He was named Minister of Government Services and Minister of Highways and Transportation on November 30, 1981. He was relieved of the former position on August 20, 1982, and of the latter on November 4, 1983, when he was appointed Minister of Business Development and Tourism with responsibility for the Manitoba Telephone System Act. Following another cabinet shuffle on January 30, 1985, he was named Minister of Natural Resources.

Uskiw did not run for re-election in 1986, and in fact supported the Progressive Conservative candidate in Lac Du Bonnet (who was defeated). He personally joined the Tories after the election, and soon became one of the party's leading consultants and financial contributors (There was a period when he may have been the party's largest personal donor). Uskiw also spoke at meetings of Green's Progressive Party, in which he argued that demands from the trade union movement had undermined his ministerial independence during the Pawley years.

After retiring from politics, he operated a consulting business. He did not seek a return to active politics after 1986. In the 1990s, he chaired a commission overseeing changes to the province's Personal Injury Protection Plan.

While in office, Uskiw supported the expansion of nuclear power in Manitoba.

Although he was no longer a member of the New Democratic Party at the time, Uskiw supported Edward Schreyer's bid to return to the Canadian House of Commons in the 2006 federal election

Uskiw died in hospital in Selkirk at the age of 77 after a lengthy battle with colon cancer.
