= Rural Municipality of Brokenhead =

Rural municipality in Manitoba, Canada

Brokenhead
- Rural municipality
- Rural Municipality of Brokenhead
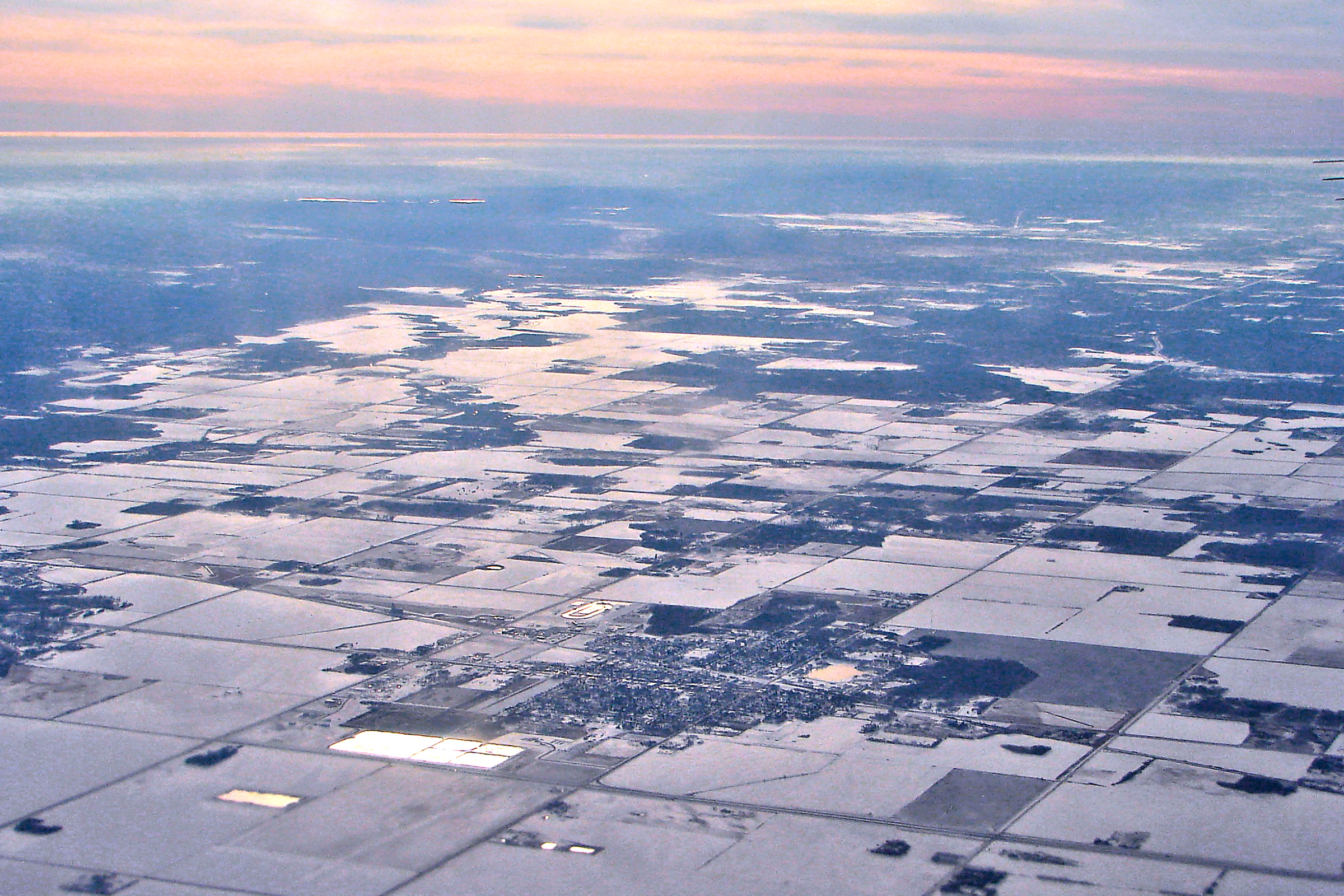
- Aerial view of RM Brokenhead with Beausejour in the centre

- Location of Brokenhead in Manitoba
- Coordinates: 50.123°N 96.540°W
- Country: Canada
- Province: Manitoba
- Region: Eastman
- Incorporated: November 15, 1900

Area
  - Total: 749.69 km^{2} (289.46 sq mi)

Population (2021 Census)
  - Total: 5,414
  - Density: 7.222/km^{2} (18.70/sq mi)
- Time zone: UTC-6 (CST)
  - Summer (DST): UTC-5 (CDT)
- Website: rmofbrokenhead.ca/home

The Rural Municipality of Brokenhead is a rural municipality (RM) in the Canadian province of Manitoba.

The town of Beausejour, a separate urban municipality, lies within the borders of Brokenhead.

== History ==
The RM was incorporated on 15 November 1900.

The RM had a population of 4,635 in the 2011 Census, an increase of 17.6% over its population of 3,940 in the 2006 Census. The RM is adjacent on its western and southern sides to, but not a part of, the Census Metropolitan Area of Winnipeg.

== Communities ==
The Town of Beausejour is a separate urban municipality but shares some of administrative services with the RM of Brokenhead.

Local urban districts

- Tyndall–Garson (includes the neighbouring communities of Tyndall and Garson)

Hamlets

- Brokenhead
- Cloverleaf
- Cromwell
- Green Bay
- Hazelglen
- Ladywood
- Lydiatt
- St. Ouens

== Demographics ==
In the 2021 Census of Population conducted by Statistics Canada, Brokenhead had a population of 5,414 living in 2,053 of its 2,213 total private dwellings, a change of 5.7% from its 2016 population of 5,122. With a land area of 749.69 km^{2} (289.46 sq mi), it had a population density of 7.2/km^{2} (18.7/sq mi) in 2021.

== Notable residents ==
- Clarence Baker — New Democratic Party of Manitoba MLA.
- Fred Klym — Progressive Conservative Party of Manitoba MLA.
- John Sinnott — MP in the House of Commons of Canada, served as reeve of Brokenhead from 1936 to 1943 and 1950 to 1951.
- Edward Schreyer — Governor General of Canada from January 22, 1979 to May 14, 1984
