= Beausejour, Manitoba =

Town in Manitoba, Canada

Beausejour
- Town
- Town of Beausejour
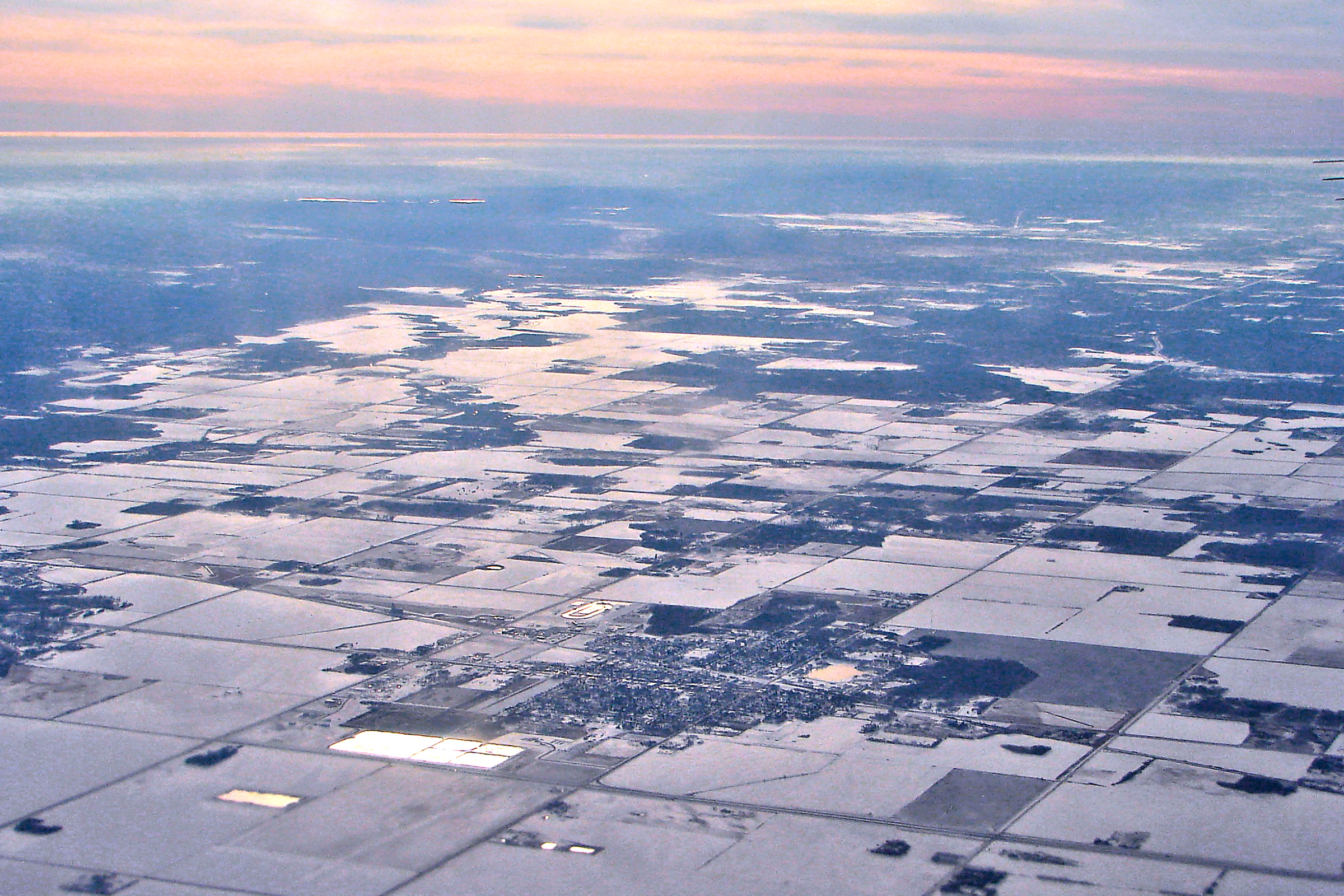
- Aerial view with Beausejour in the centre foreground, 2012

- Town boundaries

- Location of Beausejour in Manitoba
- Coordinates: 50°03′44″N 96°30′58″W
- Country: Canada
- Province: Manitoba
- Region: Eastman
- Rural Municipality: Brokenhead
- Established: 1874
- Incorporated: 1908 (village); 1912 (town)

Government
  - Mayor: Ray Schrile
  - Governing Body: Town council
  - MP (Selkirk-Interlake-Eastman): James Bezan (CPC)
  - MLA (Lac du Bonnet): Wayne Ewasko (PC)

Area
  - Land: 5.42 km^{2} (2.09 sq mi)
- Elevation: 251.2 m (824 ft)

Population (2021)
  - Total: 3,307
  - Density: 609.6/km^{2} (1,579/sq mi)
- Time zone: UTC-6 (CST)
  - Summer (DST): UTC-5 (CDT)
- Area codes: 204/431
- Website: www.townofbeausejour.ca

Beausejour (/ˌboʊzəˈʒʊər/) is a town in the Canadian province of Manitoba. It is 46 kilometres northeast of Winnipeg, just west of the Canadian Shield and Whiteshell Provincial Park. The French name Beauséjour [beau + séjour] means "beautiful stay". The town is surrounded by the Rural Municipality of Brokenhead.

== Etymology ==
The current community name comes from the French phrase meaning "a good place" or "a good stopping place". There are a few variations as to the origin and establishment of the name, although all share similarities in being named by a railway employee. One version is that a French Canadian CN Railway engineer, after slashing through brush and swamp, came to this high and grassy place.

A second documented version from S. Turner, the town's postmaster in 1905 says that he believed the town name came from a French Canadian government engineer. The railway station was built on a small, elevated area of sand and gravel, which had been called "Stony Prairie" by local Indigenous peoples. The engineer provided the name as it was a good camping ground from the other low lying areas.

A third and final version says that the town`s first residents, Mr. and Mrs. H.W.D. Armstrong were the ones to name the town. Mr. H.W.D. Armstrong was a Canadian Pacific Railway surveyor who was responsible for the selection of names along this line and asked his wife to name it. She suggested the Beausejour name for "a nice play to stay".

== History ==
In 1906, the "Manitoba Glass Works" was founded, in a settler town now known as Beausejour, by Joseph Keilback and his partners. Sustained by a nearby deposit of high quality sand, it was the first glass container factory in Western Canada. Glassblowers from Poland and the United States, supported by local labour, used silica sands to produce bottles for breweries and soft drink companies in Winnipeg, Manitoba. In 1909 it was taken over by a Winnipeg businessman, who expanded production to include jars, medicine bottles, and ink bottles.

At its peak, the Manitoba Glass Works employed 350 workers, but because of its inability to compete with Eastern Canadian manufacturers, the factory was purchased in 1913 by a Montreal company and relocated to Redcliff, Alberta. The factory site remains, and was designated as a Provincial Heritage Site (number 41) on 27 September 1989.

In 1912, the Town of Beausejour was incorporated.

Beausejour is the birthplace of former Manitoba Premier and Governor General Edward Schreyer. Ecole Edward Schreyer School is named after him in his honour.

== Movies Filmed In Beausejour ==
Beausejour has had the following movies that have at least one scene filmed within the town limits:

1. Beausejour was the setting for the 1990 film The Outside Chance of Maximilian Glick, & its 1990-91 television dramedy series adaptation, Max Glick. The film was largely filmed there.
2. Dark Harvest (2023 film)
3. Heaven is for Real
4. Flag Day (film) starring Sean Penn
5. Noelle Nomads (Hallmark)
6. Northern Lights

== Demographics ==
Historical population
Year	Pop.	±%
1911	847	—
1921	994	+17.4%
1931	1,139	+14.6%
1941	1,161	+1.9%
1951	1,376	+18.5%
1961	1,770	+28.6%
1996	2,712	+53.2%
2001	2,772	+2.2%
2006	2,823	+1.8%
2011	3,126	+10.7%
2016	3,219	+3.0%
2021	3,307	+2.7%

In the 2021 Census of Population conducted by Statistics Canada, Beausejour had a population of 3,307 living in 1,483 of its 1,572 total private dwellings, a change of 2.7% from its 2016 population of 3,219. With a land area of 5.42 km^{2} (2.09 sq mi), it had a population density of 610.1/km^{2} (1,580.3/sq mi) in 2021.

== Access ==
Major highways servicing Beausejour are PTH 44 and PTH 12, which run concurrently north of town.

From the south, Beausejour can be reached by traveling PTH 12 and Provincial Road 215 east into town or by taking PR 302. PTH 44, PR 215, and PR 302 intersect at the west side of town.

Prior to the construction of the Trans-Canada Highway, PTH 44 was the main route from Winnipeg to the Ontario border which led to towns such as Kenora.

== Economy ==
Beausejour's current economy is based on agriculture (grain production) and tourism. Its location as a main access point to the Whiteshell Provincial Park, a popular cottage region and tourist attraction, which allows Beausejour to cater to visitor traffic through the area.

Beausejour also serves as the main commercial centre for farmers and residents of the surrounding areas.

== Notable people ==
- Raquel Dancho, politician
- Bob Davie, former NHL defenceman
- Monika Deol, TV host
- Peter Engbrecht, WWII pilot
- Jason Gunnlaugson, curler
- Fred Klym, politician
- Mark Koenker, politician
- Brek Liske, drafted by the Philadelphia Flyers 53rd overall in the 2026 NHL Draft
- Hayley Marie Kohle, model
- Edward Schreyer, former Premier of Manitoba and Governor general of Canada
- John Mouat Turner, politician
- Anton Weselak, politician

== Events/Things to See ==
=== Annual Events ===
The town is home to the Canadian Power Toboggan Championships, the Double B Agricultural Festival and the annual Brokenhead River Agricultural Conference.

Beausejour is also known for its annual "Shades of the Past" car show on the last Sunday of August. The car show encompasses all of Park Avenue and attracts over 500 classic and special interest vehicles.

=== Curling ===
Beausejour has also hosted the 2011 Manitoba provincial men's curling championship (then known as the Safeway Championship) and two Manitoba provincial women's curling championships, known as the Scotties Tournament of Hearts, at the Beausejour Sportsplex.

=== Daylily Gardens ===
Beausejour is home to the Daylily Gardens located at 950 First Street North. Daylily Gardens is a two acre garden that homes the only official American Daylily Society in the Prairies of Canada. Daylily Gardens in Beausejour is also known as the coldest American Daylily Society garden on the planet.

=== Broken-Beau Pioneer Village Museum ===
Beausejour is home to a museum that reflects a historical outlook on what early settling Canadians (typically from Poland, Ukraine, German descent from places called Galicia and Volhynia) faced when arriving in Beausejour in the early 1900's. This museum contains a house, school, railway station, stores, and churches that were all recovered and preserved for this museum.

=== St. Mary Roman Catholic Church ===
Located in Beausejour, St. Mary Roman Catholic Church is famous for the ceiling and wall paintings inside of the church painted by local Winnipeg artist Leo Mol.

=== Wally Chryplywy Nature Park ===
Beausejour has a nature park that has about five kilometres of hiking trails, including two kilometres of paved trails

== Sports ==
=== Recreational Sports ===
Beausejour has the following recreational sports that are available:

- Golfing - River's Edge Golf Course
- Curling - Beausejour Curling Club
- Slo-Pitch
- Skate Park
- Aquatic Centre - Splash Park Pool

=== Hockey ===
- Beausejour's minor hockey teams are known as the Beausejour Blades.
- Beausejour's Capital Region Junior Hockey League (CRJHL) Beausejour Comets who play in the Beausejour Sportsplex
- Beausejour has two high school hockey teams (female, and male teams respectively) which play out of the Beausejour Sportsplex both named the Beausejour Barons

=== Former Hockey Teams ===
- The Eastman Selects of the Manitoba Midget 'AAA' Hockey League formerly played in the town of Beausejour. Hockey games were played in the Beausejour Sportsplex. In 2025, the Eastman Selects moved to Steinbach, Manitoba.

== Canadian Power Toboggan Championships ==
Annually, the Canadian Power Toboggan Championships [CPTC] happen within Beausejour. According to CPTC, it is the largest snowmobile racing festival in the world, and the second largest winter festival within the province of Manitoba, Canada.

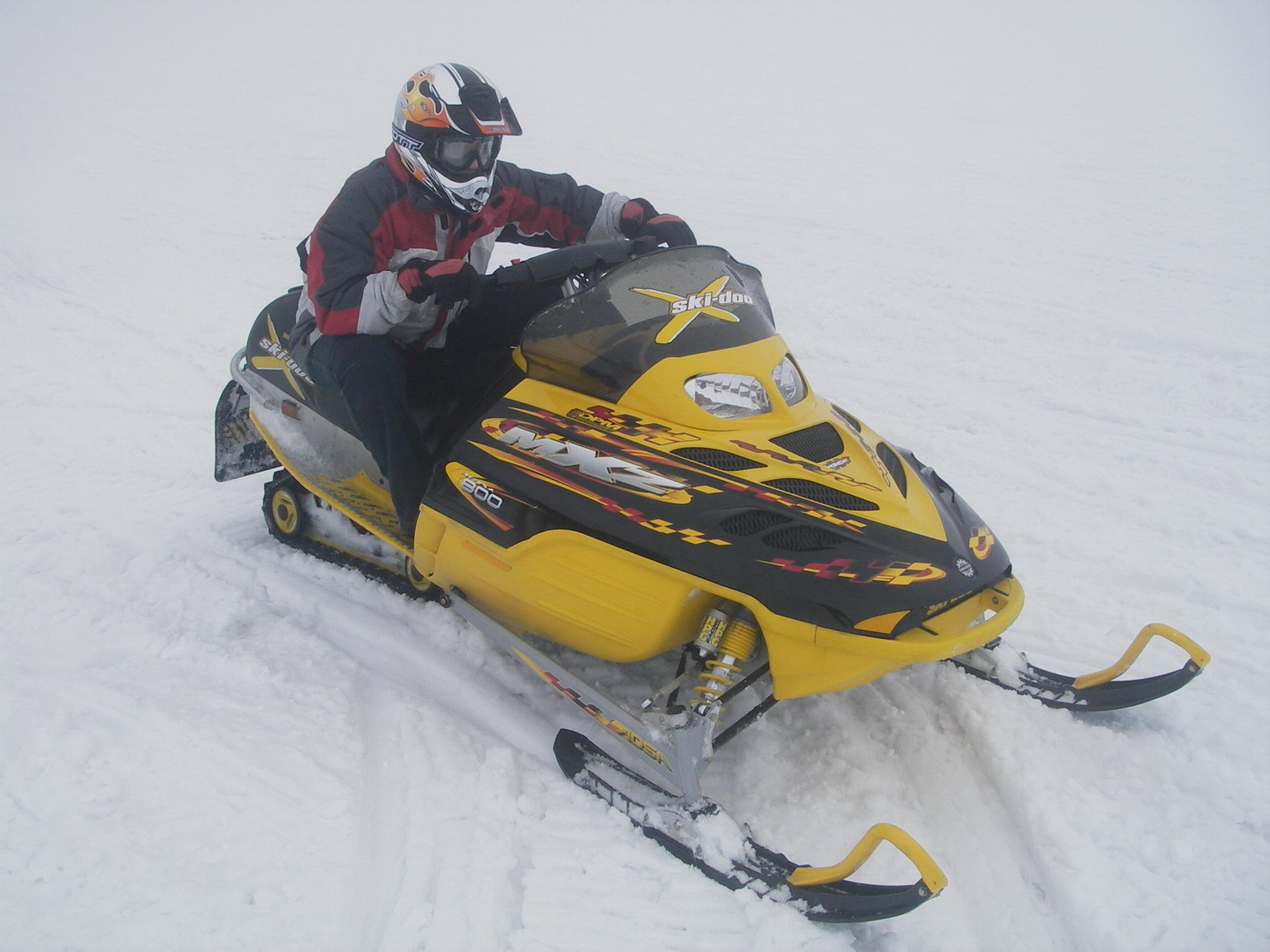
Example of Snowmobile

Historically, one of the most famous racers to win at CPTC in Beausejour would be former Formula One driver Gilles Villeneuve who won in the years 1973, and 1975 respectively. Gille's brother, Jacques Villeneuve who is also a former Formula One driver by technicality, has won the event in 1974, 1987, and in 2006.

== Media ==
There are two local weekly community newspapers named The Clippery Weekly and The Lac Du Bonnet Clipper that serve the Beausejour and Brokenhead area. These papers can be found in person within the area, or they can also be viewed online for free via their 'e-edition'.

Beausejour has one radio station. It is named Town Radio Beausejour and they broadcast to Beausejour and the surrounding area as CKBJ-FM at 93.3 FM.

== Climate ==
Beausejour has a humid continental climate influenced by its far inland position in the higher mid-latitudes, resulting in warm and occasionally hot summers and frequently severely cold winters, with January average highs being below −11 °C (12 °F).

Climate data for Beausejour (1981–2010 normals)
Month	Jan	Feb	Mar	Apr	May	Jun	Jul	Aug	Sep	Oct	Nov	Dec	Year
Record high °C (°F)	7.0 (44.6)	10.5 (50.9)	18.5 (65.3)	34.0 (93.2)	37.0 (98.6)	38.0 (100.4)	36.7 (98.1)	39.0 (102.2)	38.0 (100.4)	29.4 (84.9)	22.2 (72.0)	8.5 (47.3)	39.0 (102.2)
Mean daily maximum °C (°F)	−11.3 (11.7)	−7.0 (19.4)	−0.3 (31.5)	10.5 (50.9)	18.4 (65.1)	23.1 (73.6)	25.6 (78.1)	25.2 (77.4)	18.5 (65.3)	10.2 (50.4)	−0.4 (31.3)	−9.1 (15.6)	8.6 (47.5)
Daily mean °C (°F)	−16.9 (1.6)	−12.8 (9.0)	−5.7 (21.7)	4.2 (39.6)	11.4 (52.5)	16.7 (62.1)	19.3 (66.7)	18.5 (65.3)	12.5 (54.5)	5.0 (41.0)	−4.8 (23.4)	−14.1 (6.6)	2.8 (37.0)
Mean daily minimum °C (°F)	−22.4 (−8.3)	−18.5 (−1.3)	−11.2 (11.8)	−2.2 (28.0)	4.3 (39.7)	10.2 (50.4)	12.9 (55.2)	11.6 (52.9)	6.4 (43.5)	−0.3 (31.5)	−9.1 (15.6)	−19.1 (−2.4)	−3.1 (26.4)
Record low °C (°F)	−44.5 (−48.1)	−46.7 (−52.1)	−42.2 (−44.0)	−30.6 (−23.1)	−13.9 (7.0)	−4.4 (24.1)	0.0 (32.0)	−2.5 (27.5)	−8.3 (17.1)	−23.0 (−9.4)	−39.5 (−39.1)	−42.5 (−44.5)	−46.7 (−52.1)
Average precipitation mm (inches)	24.6 (0.97)	15.5 (0.61)	23.4 (0.92)	29.7 (1.17)	58.1 (2.29)	87.5 (3.44)	87.1 (3.43)	76.3 (3.00)	65.1 (2.56)	46.0 (1.81)	29.7 (1.17)	27.2 (1.07)	570.3 (22.45)
Average snowfall cm (inches)	24.3 (9.6)	13.1 (5.2)	14.2 (5.6)	9.0 (3.5)	3.1 (1.2)	0.0 (0.0)	0.0 (0.0)	0.0 (0.0)	0.0 (0.0)	7.5 (3.0)	21.2 (8.3)	25.5 (10.0)	117.8 (46.4)
Source: Environment Canada
