= By-elections to the 24th Canadian Parliament =

By-elections to the 24th Canadian Parliament were held to fill vacancies in the House of Commons of Canada between the 1958 federal election and the 1962 federal election. The Progressive Conservative Party of Canada led a majority government for the 24th Canadian Parliament.

Fourteen vacant seats were filled through by-elections.

By-election	Date	Incumbent	Party	Winner	Party	Cause	Retained
Esquimalt—Saanich	May 29, 1961	George Pearkes	Progressive Conservative	George Chatterton	Progressive Conservative	Appointed Lieutenant Governor of British Columbia	Yes
Restigouche—Madawaska	May 29, 1961	Joseph Charles Van Horne	Progressive Conservative	Edgar-E. Fournier	Progressive Conservative	Resignation	Yes
Leeds	May 29, 1961	Hayden Stanton	Progressive Conservative	John Ross Matheson	Liberal	Death	No
King's	May 29, 1961	John Augustine Macdonald	Progressive Conservative	Margaret Mary Macdonald	Progressive Conservative	Death	Yes
Royal	October 31, 1960	Alfred J. Brooks	Progressive Conservative	Hugh John Flemming	Progressive Conservative	Called to the Senate	Yes
Niagara Falls	October 31, 1960	William Houck	Liberal	Judy LaMarsh	Liberal	Death	Yes
Peterborough	October 31, 1960	Gordon K. Fraser	Progressive Conservative	Walter Pitman	New	Death	No
Labelle	October 31, 1960	Henri Courtemanche	Progressive Conservative	Gaston Clermont	Liberal	Called to the Senate	No
Hastings—Frontenac	October 5, 1959	Sidney Earle Smith	Progressive Conservative	Rod Webb	Progressive Conservative	Death	Yes
Russell	October 5, 1959	Joseph-Omer Gour	Liberal	Paul Tardif	Liberal	Death	Yes
Springfield	December 15, 1958	Val Yacula	Progressive Conservative	Joe Slogan	Progressive Conservative	Death	Yes
Trinity	December 15, 1958	Edward R. Lockyer	Progressive Conservative	Paul Hellyer	Liberal	Death	No
Grenville—Dundas	September 29, 1958	A. Clair Casselman	Progressive Conservative	Jean Casselman	Progressive Conservative	Death	Yes
Montmagny—L'Islet	September 29, 1958	Jean Lesage	Liberal	Louis Fortin	Progressive Conservative	Resigned to enter provincial politics in Quebec	No

== See also ==
- List of federal by-elections in Canada

== Sources ==
- Parliament of Canada–Elected in By-Elections
