= List of members of the Canadian House of Commons with military service (W) =

Name	Elected party	Constituency	Elected date	Military service
Ian Grant Wahn	Liberal	St. Paul's	June 18, 1962	Canadian Army
John Walker	Liberal	London	January 22, 1874	Militia (1875-1884)
Thomas George Wallace	Conservative	York Centre	October 26, 1908	Militia (1899-1900)
Henry Alfred Ward	Conservative	Durham East	August 24, 1885	Militia (1903-1909)
George Dyer Weaver	Liberal	Churchill	June 27, 1949	South African Army (1942-1944), Canadian Army (1944-1945)
Roderick Arthur Ennis Webb	Progressive Conservative	Hastings—Frontenac	October 5, 1959	Royal Canadian Air Force (1940-1945)
Oscar William Weichel	Progressive Conservative	Waterloo North	March 31, 1958	Canadian Army
Robert Weir	Conservative	Melfort	July 28, 1930	Canadian Army (1915-1919)
Anton Weselak	Liberal	Springfield	August 10, 1953	Royal Canadian Air Force (1942-1945)
Eugene Whelan	Liberal	Essex South	June 18, 1962	Canadian Army
Ross Whicher	Liberal	Bruce	June 25, 1968	Canadian Army, British Army
George Stanley White	National Government	Hastings—Peterborough	March 26, 1940	Canadian Army
Gerald Verner White	Conservative	Renfrew North	October 9, 1906	Canadian Army
Harry Oliver White	Progressive Conservative	Middlesex East	June 11, 1945	Canadian Army
Randy White	Reform	Fraser Valley West	October 25, 1993	Canadian Forces Air Command
Frederick Primrose Whitman	Liberal	Mount Royal	March 26, 1940	Canadian Army
George H. Whittaker	Progressive Conservative	Okanagan Boundary	October 30, 1972	Royal Air Force
William Hannum Wightman	Progressive Conservative	Scarborough West	May 22, 1979	Canadian Army, Royal Canadian Air Force (1950-)
Arthur Trefusis Heneage Williams	Conservative	Durham East	September 17, 1878	Militia (1866-1885)
William C. Winegard	Progressive Conservative	Guelph	September 4, 1984	Royal Canadian Navy (1942-1945)
Eric Alfred Winkler	Progressive Conservative	Grey—Bruce	June 10, 1957	Royal Canadian Air Force (1940-1946)
Howard Winkler	Liberal	Lisgar	October 14, 1935	Canadian Army
Robert Henry Winters	Liberal	Queens—Lunenburg	June 11, 1945	Canadian Army
Bob Wood	Liberal	Nipissing	November 21, 1988	Royal Canadian Air Force (1959-1968), Canadian Forces Air Command (1968-1976)
Arthur Norreys Worthington	Conservative	Town of Sherbrooke	November 3, 1904	Militia (1885-)
Alonzo Wright	Liberal-Conservative	Ottawa (County of)	September 20, 1867	Militia
Henry Oswald Wright	Unionist	Battleford	December 17, 1917	Militia (1899-1902)
Percy Ellis Wright	Cooperative Commonwealth Federation	Melfort	March 26, 1940	Canadian Army (1915-1918)
