= 24th Canadian Parliament =

1958–1962 legislative term

- Majority parliament
- May. 12, 1958 – Apr. 19, 1962

Parliament leaders
- Prime minister: John Diefenbaker; Jun. 21, 1957 – Apr. 22, 1963
- Cabinet: 18th Canadian Ministry
- Leader of the Opposition: Lester B. Pearson; January 16, 1958 – April 22, 1963

Party caucuses
- Government: Progressive Conservative Party
- Opposition: Liberal Party
- Crossbench: Co-operative Commonwealth Federation

House of Commons
- Seating arrangements of the House of Commons
- Speaker of the Commons: Roland Michener; October 14, 1957 – September 26, 1962
- Government House leader: Howard Charles Green; October 14, 1957 – July 18, 1959
- Gordon Churchill; January 14, 1960 − February 5, 1963
- Opposition House leader: Lionel Chevrier; October 14, 1957 – February 5, 1963
- Members: 265 MP seats List of members

Senate
- Speaker of the Senate: Mark Robert Drouin; October 4, 1957 – September 23, 1962
- Government Senate leader: Walter Aseltine; May 12, 1958 − August 31, 1962
- Opposition Senate leader: William Ross Macdonald; June 21, 1957 – April 22, 1963
- Senators: 102 senator seats List of senators

Sovereign
- Monarch: Elizabeth II; 6 February 1952 – 8 September 2022
- Governor general: Vincent Massey; 28 February 1952 – 15 September 1959
- Georges Vanier; 15 September 1959 – 5 March 1967

Sessions
- 1st session May 12, 1958 – September 6, 1958
- 2nd session January 15, 1959 – July 18, 1959
- 3rd session January 14, 1960 – August 10, 1960
- 4th session November 17, 1960 – September 29, 1961
- 5th session January 18, 1962 – April 19, 1962
← 23rd	→ 25th

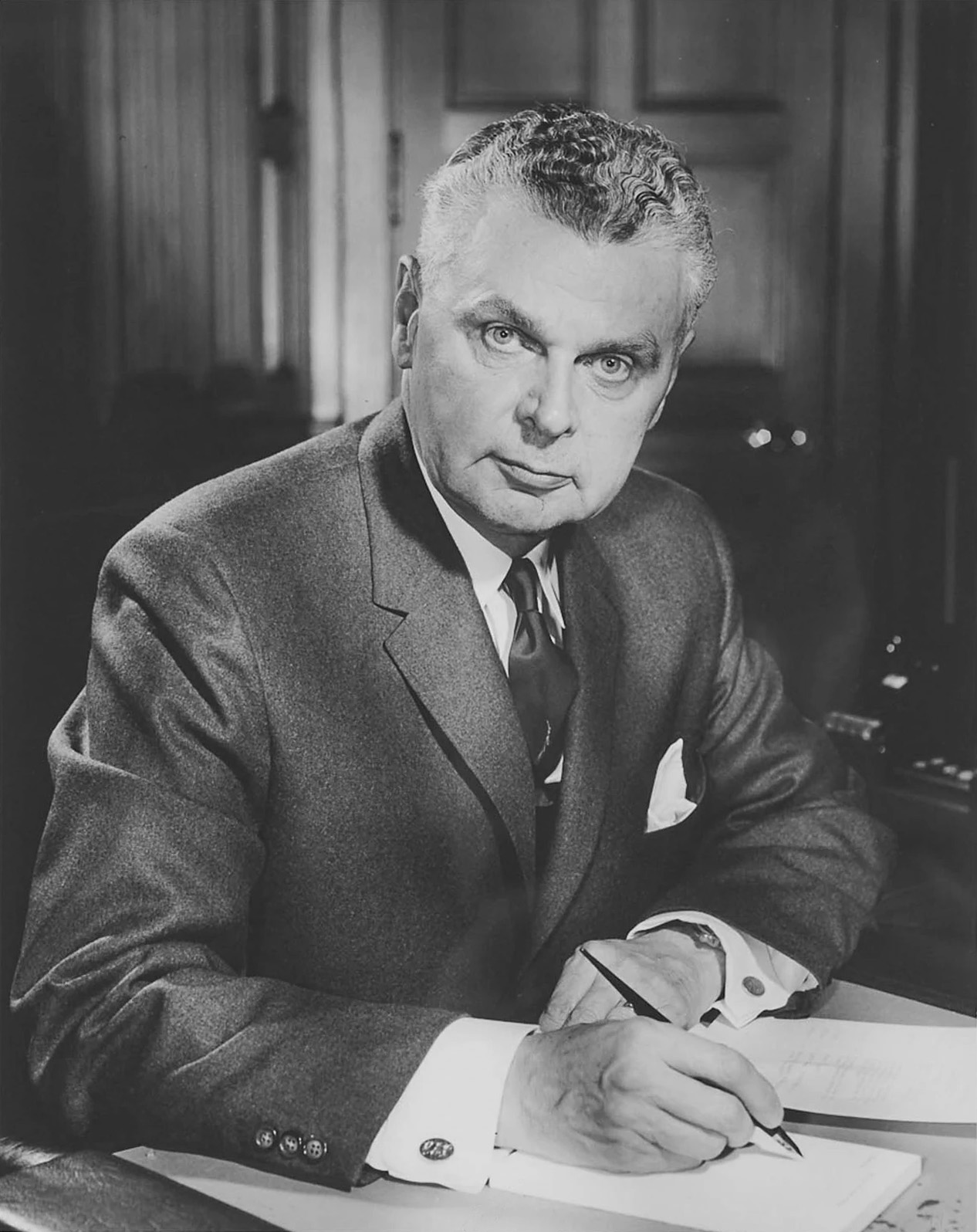
John Diefenbaker was Prime Minister during the 24th Canadian Parliament.

The 24th Canadian Parliament was in session from May 12, 1958, until April 19, 1962. The membership was set by the 1958 federal election on March 31, 1958, and it changed only somewhat due to resignations and by-elections until it was dissolved prior to the 1962 election.

There were five sessions of the 24th Parliament:

Session	Start	End
1st	May 12, 1958	September 6, 1958
2nd	January 15, 1959	July 18, 1959
3rd	January 14, 1960	August 10, 1960
4th	November 17, 1960	September 29, 1961
5th	January 18, 1962	April 19, 1962

== Overview ==
It was controlled by a Progressive Conservative Party majority, which won the largest majority in Canadian history, under Prime Minister John Diefenbaker and the 18th Canadian Ministry. The Official Opposition was the Liberal Party, led by Lester B. Pearson.

== Party standings ==
Number of members per party	Party leader	General Election
Number of members per party	Party leader	March 31, 1958
Progressive Conservative	John Diefenbaker	208
Liberal	Lester B. Pearson	48
Co-operative Commonwealth	M.J. Coldwell	8
Liberal-Labour		1
Total Seats		265

== Major events ==
=== Voting rights for indigenous people ===
Prior to 1960, Indigenous people in Canada did not have the right to vote, but could gain it through the process of enfranchisement, giving up their 'Indian' status. On March 31, 1960, an act brought in by Diefenbaker's government, updating section 14 of the Canada Elections Act, received royal ascent. This bill gave indigenous peoples in Canada the right vote without giving up their status. It had received nearly unanimous consent from parliament.

=== The Avro Arrow cancelation ===
In the early 1950's Canada had commissioned the design and development of a new interceptor jet that could be used to fend off attack from the Soviet Union. Avro Canada, an aircraft company, was contracted for the job and began development of the "CF-105 Arrow".

By 1959, the government found itself balancing the costs of multiple priorities, and on February 20th, 1959, development of the arrow was scrapped. This in itself was not cause for scandal, but following the cancelation of the program, the government ordered a large amount of prototypes, tooling, and materials related to the program destroyed. This caused widescale distrust of the government and resulted in thousands of workers losing their jobs, essentially overnight.

The fallout from the cancellation of the Arrow cost the Progressive Conservative party a good deal of support and contributed to their loss in the following election.

== Ministry ==
Main article: 18th Canadian Ministry

The 18th Canadian Ministry began at the beginning of the 23rd Canadian Parliament and lasted until near the end of the 25th Canadian Parliament.

== Office holders ==
=== Head of State ===
Office	Photo	Name	Assumed office	Left office
Sovereign		Elizabeth II	February 6, 1952	September 8, 2022
Governor General		Vincent Massey	February 28, 1952	September 15, 1959
Governor General		Georges Vanier	September 15, 1959	March 5, 1967

=== Party leadership ===
Party	Photo	Name	Assumed office	Left office
Progressive Conservative		John Diefenbaker	December 14, 1956	September 8, 1967
Liberal		Lester B. Pearson	January 16, 1958	April 6, 1968
Social Credit		Solon Low	April 6, 1944	July 6, 1961
Social Credit		R.N. Thompson	July 7, 1961	March 9, 1967
CCF/New Democratic		M. J. Coldwell	July 29, 1942	August 10, 1960
CCF/New Democratic		Hazen Argue	August 11, 1960	August 2, 1961
CCF/New Democratic		Tommy Douglas	August 3, 1961	April 24, 1971

=== House of Commons ===
==== Presiding officer ====
Office	Photo	Officer	Riding	Assumed office	Left office	Party
Speaker of the House of Commons		Roland Michener	St. Paul's	October 14, 1957	September 27, 1962	Progressive Conservative

==== Government leadership (Progressive Conservative) ====
Office	Photo	Officer	Riding	From	To
Prime Minister		John Diefenbaker	Prince Albert	June 21, 1957	April 22, 1963
House Leader		Howard Charles Green	Vancouver South	October 14, 1957	July 18, 1959
House Leader		Gordon Churchill	Winnipeg South Centre	January 14, 1960	February 5, 1963

== Changes to party standings ==
=== By-elections ===
By-election	Date	Incumbent	Party	Winner	Party	Cause	Retained
Esquimalt—Saanich	May 29, 1961	George Pearkes	Progressive Conservative	George Chatterton	Progressive Conservative	Appointed Lieutenant Governor of British Columbia	Yes
Restigouche—Madawaska	May 29, 1961	Joseph Charles Van Horne	Progressive Conservative	Edgar-E. Fournier	Progressive Conservative	Resignation	Yes
Leeds	May 29, 1961	Hayden Stanton	Progressive Conservative	John Ross Matheson	Liberal	Death	No
King's	May 29, 1961	John Augustine Macdonald	Progressive Conservative	Margaret Mary Macdonald	Progressive Conservative	Death	Yes
Royal	October 31, 1960	Alfred J. Brooks	Progressive Conservative	Hugh John Flemming	Progressive Conservative	Called to the Senate	Yes
Niagara Falls	October 31, 1960	William Houck	Liberal	Judy LaMarsh	Liberal	Death	Yes
Peterborough	October 31, 1960	Gordon K. Fraser	Progressive Conservative	Walter Pitman	New	Death	No
Labelle	October 31, 1960	Henri Courtemanche	Progressive Conservative	Gaston Clermont	Liberal	Called to the Senate	No
Hastings—Frontenac	October 5, 1959	Sidney Earle Smith	Progressive Conservative	Rod Webb	Progressive Conservative	Death	Yes
Russell	October 5, 1959	Joseph-Omer Gour	Liberal	Paul Tardif	Liberal	Death	Yes
Springfield	December 15, 1958	Val Yacula	Progressive Conservative	Joe Slogan	Progressive Conservative	Death	Yes
Trinity	December 15, 1958	Edward R. Lockyer	Progressive Conservative	Paul Hellyer	Liberal	Death	No
Grenville—Dundas	September 29, 1958	A. Clair Casselman	Progressive Conservative	Jean Casselman	Progressive Conservative	Death	Yes
Montmagny—L'Islet	September 29, 1958	Jean Lesage	Liberal	Louis Fortin	Progressive Conservative	Resigned to enter provincial politics in Quebec	No

== Parliamentarians ==
=== House of Commons ===
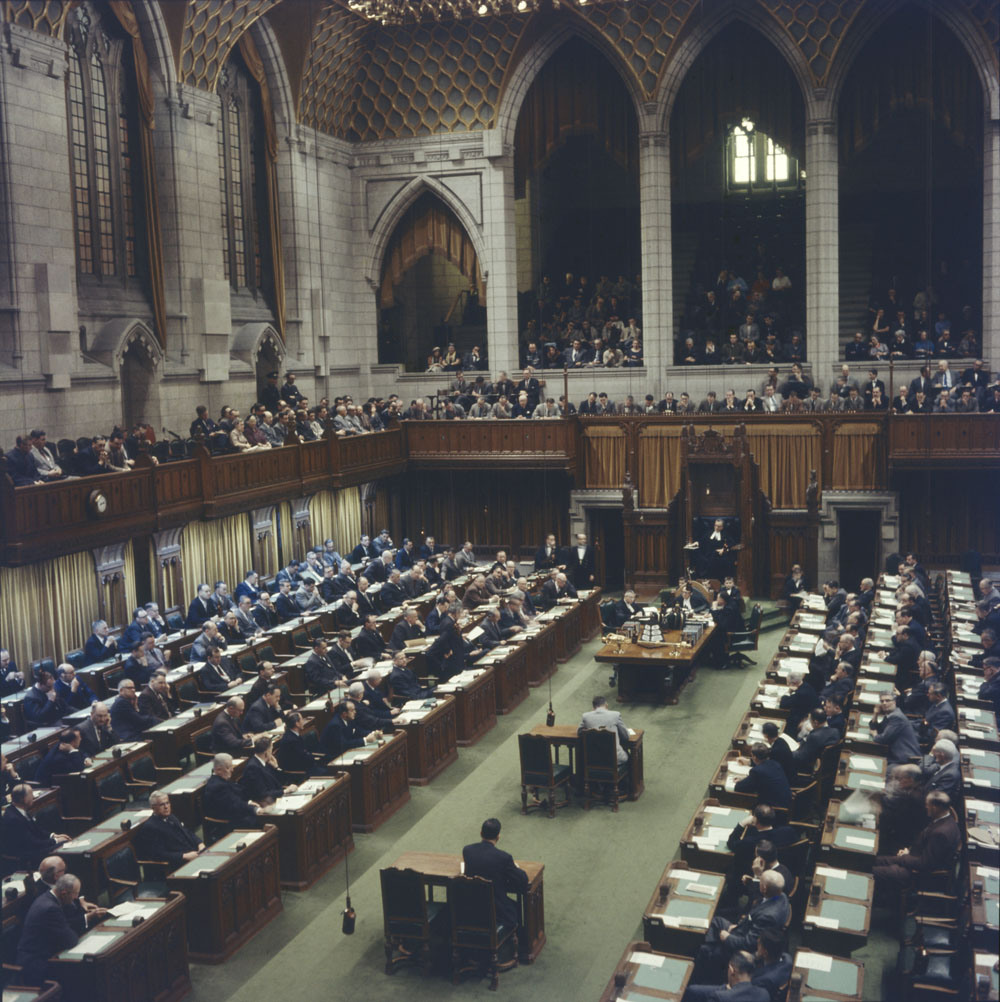
Prime Minister Diefenbaker addressing the House of Commons in January, 1959.

Following is a full list of members of the twenty-fourth Parliament listed first by province or territory, then by electoral district.

Key:

- Party leaders are italicized.
- Parliamentary secretaries is indicated by "‡".
- Cabinet ministers are in **boldface**.
- The Prime Minister is **both**.
- The Speaker is indicated by "(†)".

Electoral districts denoted by an asterisk (*) indicates that district was represented by two members.

==== Alberta ====
Electoral district	Name	Party	First elected/previously elected	No. of terms
Acadia	Jack Horner	Progressive Conservative	1958	1st term
Athabaska	Jack Bigg	Progressive Conservative	1958	1st term
Battle River—Camrose	Clifford Smallwood	Progressive Conservative	1958	1st term
Bow River	Eldon Woolliams	Progressive Conservative	1958	1st term
Calgary North	**Douglas Harkness**	Progressive Conservative	1945	5th term
Calgary South	Arthur Ryan Smith	Progressive Conservative	1957	2nd term
Edmonton East	William Skoreyko	Progressive Conservative	1958	1st term
Edmonton—Strathcona	Terry Nugent	Progressive Conservative	1958	1st term
Edmonton West	Marcel Lambert ‡	Progressive Conservative	1957	2nd term
Jasper—Edson	Hugh Horner	Progressive Conservative	1958	1st term
Lethbridge	Deane Gundlock	Progressive Conservative	1958	1st term
Macleod	Lawrence Kindt	Progressive Conservative	1958	1st term
Medicine Hat	Edwin William Brunsden	Progressive Conservative	1958	1st term
Peace River	Ged Baldwin	Progressive Conservative	1958	1st term
Red Deer	Harris George Rogers	Progressive Conservative	1958	1st term
Vegreville	Frank Fane	Progressive Conservative	1958	1st term
Wetaskiwin	James Stanley Speakman	Progressive Conservative	1958	1st term

==== British Columbia ====
Electoral district	Name	Party	First elected/previously elected	No. of terms
Burnaby—Coquitlam	Erhart Regier	C.C.F.	1953	3rd term
Burnaby—Coquitlam	Erhart Regier	New Democratic Party	1953	3rd term
Burnaby—Richmond	John Drysdale	Progressive Conservative	1958	1st term
Cariboo	Walter Henderson	Progressive Conservative	1958	1st term
Coast—Capilano	William Hector Payne	Progressive Conservative	1958	1st term
Comox—Alberni	Henry McQuillan	Progressive Conservative	1958	1st term
Esquimalt—Saanich	**George Pearkes** (until 11 October 1960 emoulment appointment)	Progressive Conservative	1945	5th term
Esquimalt—Saanich	George Chatterton (by-election of 1961-05-29)	Progressive Conservative	1961	1st term
Fraser Valley	William Harold Hicks	Progressive Conservative	1958	1st term
Kamloops	**Davie Fulton**	Progressive Conservative	1945	5th term
Kootenay East	Murray McFarlane	Progressive Conservative	1958	1st term
Kootenay West	Herbert Wilfred Herridge	C.C.F.	1945	5th term
Kootenay West	Herbert Wilfred Herridge	New Democratic Party	1945	5th term
Nanaimo	Walter Matthews	Progressive Conservative	1958	1st term
New Westminster	William McLennan	Progressive Conservative	1958	1st term
Okanagan Boundary	David Vaughan Pugh	Progressive Conservative	1958	1st term
Okanagan—Revelstoke	Stuart Fleming	Progressive Conservative	1958	1st term
Skeena	Frank Howard	C.C.F.	1957	2nd term
Skeena	Frank Howard	New Democratic Party	1957	2nd term
Vancouver—Burrard	John Russell Taylor	Progressive Conservative	1957	2nd term
Vancouver Centre	Douglas Jung	Progressive Conservative	1957	2nd term
Vancouver East	Harold Winch	C.C.F.	1953	3rd term
Vancouver East	Harold Winch	New Democratic Party	1953	3rd term
Vancouver Kingsway	John Ferguson Browne	Progressive Conservative	1958	1st term
Vancouver Quadra	**Howard Charles Green**	Progressive Conservative	1935	7th term
Vancouver South	Ernest James Broome	Progressive Conservative	1957	2nd term
Victoria	Albert McPhillips	Progressive Conservative	1957	2nd term

==== Manitoba ====
Electoral district	Name	Party	First elected/previously elected	No. of terms
Brandon—Souris	**Walter Dinsdale** ‡	Progressive Conservative	1951	4th term
Churchill	Robert Simpson	Progressive Conservative	1957	2nd term
Dauphin	Elmer Forbes	Progressive Conservative	1958	1st term
Lisgar	George Muir	Progressive Conservative	1957	2nd term
Marquette	Nick Mandziuk	Progressive Conservative	1957	2nd term
Portage—Neepawa	George Fairfield	Progressive Conservative	1957	2nd term
Provencher	Warner Jorgenson ‡	Progressive Conservative	1957	2nd term
Selkirk	Eric Stefanson Sr.	Progressive Conservative	1958	1st term
Springfield	Val Yacula (died 24 September 1958)	Progressive Conservative	1958	1st term
Springfield	Joseph Slogan (by-election of 1958-12-15)	Progressive Conservative	1958	1st term
St. Boniface	Laurier Régnier	Progressive Conservative	1958	1st term
Winnipeg North	Murray Smith	Progressive Conservative	1958	1st term
Winnipeg North Centre	John MacLean	Progressive Conservative	1958	1st term
Winnipeg South	Gordon Chown	Progressive Conservative	1957	2nd term
Winnipeg South Centre	**Gordon Churchill**	Progressive Conservative	1951	4th term

==== New Brunswick ====
Electoral district	Name	Party	First elected/previously elected	No. of terms
Charlotte	Caldwell Stewart	Progressive Conservative	1958	1st term
Gloucester	Hédard Robichaud	Liberal	1953	3rd term
Kent	Hervé Michaud	Liberal	1953	3rd term
Northumberland—Miramichi	George Roy Mcwilliam	Liberal	1949	4th term
Restigouche—Madawaska	Charles Van Horne	Progressive Conservative	1955	3rd term
Restigouche—Madawaska	Edgar Fournier (by-election of 1961-05-29)	Progressive Conservative	1961	1st term
Royal	**Alfred Johnson Brooks**	Progressive Conservative	1935	7th term
Royal	**Hugh John Flemming** (by-election of 1960-10-31)	Progressive Conservative	1960	1st term
St. John—Albert	Thomas Miller Bell ‡	Progressive Conservative	1953	3rd term
Victoria—Carleton	Gage Montgomery	Progressive Conservative	1952	4th term
Westmorland	William Creaghan	Progressive Conservative	1958	1st term
York—Sunbury	John Chester MacRae	Progressive Conservative	1957	2nd term

==== Newfoundland ====
Electoral district	Name	Party	First elected/previously elected	No. of terms
Bonavista—Twillingate	Jack Pickersgill	Liberal	1953	3rd term
Burin—Burgeo	Chesley William Carter	Liberal	1949	4th term
Grand Falls—White Bay—Labrador	Charles Granger	Liberal	1958	1st term
Humber—St. George's	Herman Maxwell Batten	Liberal	1953	3rd term
St. John's East	James McGrath	Progressive Conservative	1957	2nd term
St. John's West	**William Joseph Browne**	Progressive Conservative	1949, 1957	3rd term*
Trinity—Conception	James Roy Tucker	Liberal	1958	1st term

==== Northwest Territories ====
Electoral district	Name	Party	First elected/previously elected	No. of terms
Mackenzie River	Merv Hardie	Liberal	1953	3rd term
Mackenzie River	Merv Hardie died on October 18, 1961	Vacant		

==== Nova Scotia ====
Electoral district	Name	Party	First elected/previously elected	No. of terms
Antigonish—Guysborough	Clement O'Leary	Progressive Conservative	1958	1st term
Cape Breton North and Victoria	Robert Muir	Progressive Conservative	1957	2nd term
Cape Breton South	Donald MacInnis	Progressive Conservative	1957	2nd term
Colchester—Hants	Cyril Kennedy	Progressive Conservative	1957	2nd term
Cumberland	Robert Coates	Progressive Conservative	1957	2nd term
Digby—Annapolis—Kings	**George Nowlan**	Progressive Conservative	1948, 1950	5th term*
Halifax*	Robert McCleave	Progressive Conservative	1957	2nd term
Halifax*	Edmund L. Morris ‡	Progressive Conservative	1957	2nd term
Inverness—Richmond	Robert MacLellan	Progressive Conservative	1958	1st term
Pictou	Russell MacEwan	Progressive Conservative	1957	2nd term
Queens—Lunenburg	Lloyd Crouse	Progressive Conservative	1957	2nd term
Shelburne—Yarmouth—Clare	Felton Legere	Progressive Conservative	1958	1st term

==== Ontario ====
Electoral district	Name	Party	First elected/previously elected	No. of terms
Algoma East	Lester B. Pearson	Liberal	1948	5th term
Algoma West	George E. Nixon	Liberal	1940	6th term
Brantford	Jack Wratten	Progressive Conservative	1957	2nd term
Brant—Haldimand	John A. Charlton ‡	Progressive Conservative	1945	5th term
Broadview	**George Hees**	Progressive Conservative	1950	4th term
Bruce	Andrew Ernest Robinson	Progressive Conservative	1945, 1953	4th term*
Carleton	Dick Bell ‡	Progressive Conservative	1957	2nd term
Cochrane	Joseph-Anaclet Habel	Liberal	1953	3rd term
Danforth	Robert Small	Progressive Conservative	1953	3rd term
Davenport	Douglas Morton	Progressive Conservative	1957	2nd term
Dufferin—Simcoe	William Earl Rowe	Progressive Conservative	1925	10th term
Durham	Percy Vivian	Progressive Conservative	1957	2nd term
Eglinton	**Donald Fleming**	Progressive Conservative	1945	5th term
Elgin	James Alexander McBain	Progressive Conservative	1954	3rd term
Essex East	Paul Martin Sr.	Liberal	1935	7th term
Essex South	Richard Thrasher ‡	Progressive Conservative	1957	2nd term
Essex West	Norman Spencer	Progressive Conservative	1958	1st term
Fort William	Hubert Badanai	Liberal	1958	1st term
Glengarry—Prescott	Osie Villeneuve	Progressive Conservative	1957	2nd term
Greenwood	**James Macdonnell**	Progressive Conservative	1945, (Note: Muskoka—Ontario) 1949	5th term*
Grenville—Dundas	Arza Clair Casselman (died 11 May 1958)	Progressive Conservative	1921, 1925	11th term*
Grenville—Dundas	Jean Casselman Wadds (by-election of 1958-09-29)	Progressive Conservative	1958	1st term
Grey—Bruce	Eric Winkler	Progressive Conservative	1957	2nd term
Grey North	Percy Verner Noble	Progressive Conservative	1957	2nd term
Halton	Charles Best	Progressive Conservative	1957	2nd term
Hamilton East	Quinto Martini ‡	Progressive Conservative	1957	2nd term
Hamilton South	Bob McDonald	Progressive Conservative	1957	2nd term
Hamilton West	**Ellen Fairclough**	Progressive Conservative	1950	4th term
Hastings—Frontenac	**Sidney Smith** (died 17 March 1959)	Progressive Conservative	1957	2nd term
Hastings—Frontenac	Rod Webb (by-election of 1959-10-05)	Progressive Conservative	1959	1st term
Hastings South	Lee Grills	Progressive Conservative	1957	2nd term
High Park	John Kucherepa	Progressive Conservative	1957	2nd term
Huron	Elston Cardiff ‡	Progressive Conservative	1940	6th term
Kenora—Rainy River	William Moore Benidickson	Liberal-Labour	1945	5th term
Kent	Harold Danforth	Progressive Conservative	1958	1st term
Kingston	Benjamin Allmark	Progressive Conservative	1958	1st term
Lambton—Kent	Ernest Campbell	Progressive Conservative	1957	2nd term
Lambton West	Joseph Warner Murphy	Progressive Conservative	1945	5th term
Lanark	George Doucett	Progressive Conservative	1957	2nd term
Leeds	Hayden Stanton (died 8 December 1960)	Progressive Conservative	1953	3rd term
Leeds	John Matheson (by-election of 1961-05-29)	Liberal	1961	1st term
Lincoln	John Smith	Progressive Conservative	1957	2nd term
London	**Ernest Halpenny**	Progressive Conservative	1957	2nd term
Middlesex East	Harry Oliver White	Progressive Conservative	1945	5th term
Middlesex West	William Howell Arthur Thomas	Progressive Conservative	1957	2nd term
Niagara Falls	William Houck (died 5 May 1960)	Liberal	1953	3rd term
Niagara Falls	Judy LaMarsh (by-election of 1960-10-31)	Liberal	1960	1st term
Nickel Belt	Osias Godin	Liberal	1958	1st term
Nipissing	Jack Garland	Liberal	1949	4th term
Norfolk	Evans Knowles	Progressive Conservative	1957	2nd term
Northumberland	Ben Thompson	Progressive Conservative	1957	2nd term
Ontario	**Michael Starr**	Progressive Conservative	1952	4th term
Ottawa East	Jean-Thomas Richard	Liberal	1945	5th term
Ottawa West	George McIlraith	Liberal	1940	6th term
Oxford	Wally Nesbitt ‡	Progressive Conservative	1953	3rd term
Parkdale	Arthur Maloney	Progressive Conservative	1957	2nd term
Parry Sound-Muskoka	Gordon Aiken	Progressive Conservative	1957	2nd term
Peel	John Pallett ‡	Progressive Conservative	1954	3rd term
Perth	**J. Waldo Monteith**	Progressive Conservative	1953	3rd term
Peterborough	Gordon Fraser	Progressive Conservative	1940	6th term
Peterborough	Walter Pitman (by-election of 1960-10-31)	New Party	1960	1st term
Peterborough	Walter Pitman (by-election of 1960-10-31)	New Democratic Party	1960	1st term
Port Arthur	Doug Fisher	C.C.F.	1957	2nd term
Port Arthur	Doug Fisher	New Democratic Party	1957	2nd term
Prince Edward—Lennox	Clarence Milligan	Progressive Conservative	1957	2nd term
Renfrew North	James Forgie	Liberal	1953	3rd term
Renfrew South	James William Baskin	Progressive Conservative	1957	2nd term
Rosedale	**David James Walker**	Progressive Conservative	1957	2nd term
Russell	Joseph-Omer Gour (died in office)	Liberal	1945	5th term
Russell	Paul Tardif (by-election of 1959-10-05)	Liberal	1959	1st term
Simcoe East	Philip Bernard Rynard	Progressive Conservative	1957	2nd term
Simcoe North	Heber Smith	Progressive Conservative	1957	2nd term
Spadina	Charles Edward Rea	Progressive Conservative	1955	3rd term
Stormont	Grant Campbell	Progressive Conservative	1958	1st term
St. Paul's	Roland Michener (†)	Progressive Conservative	1953	3rd term
Sudbury	Rodger Mitchell	Liberal	1953	3rd term
Timiskaming	Arnold Peters	C.C.F.	1957	2nd term
Timiskaming	Arnold Peters	New Democratic Party	1957	2nd term
Timmins	Murdo Martin	C.C.F.	1957	2nd term
Timmins	Murdo Martin	New Democratic Party	1957	2nd term
Trinity	Edward Lockyer (died in office)	Progressive Conservative	1958	1st term
Trinity	Paul Hellyer (by-election of 1958-12-15)	Liberal	1949, (Note: Davenport) 1958	3rd term*
Victoria	Clayton Hodgson ‡	Progressive Conservative	1945	5th term
Waterloo North	Oscar Weichel	Progressive Conservative	1958	1st term
Waterloo South	William Anderson	Progressive Conservative	1957	2nd term
Waterloo South	William Anderson died on June 6, 1961	Vacant		
Welland	William Hector McMillan	Liberal	1950	4th term
Wellington—Huron	Marvin Howe	Progressive Conservative	1953	3rd term
Wellington South	Alfred Hales	Progressive Conservative	1957	2nd term
Wentworth	Frank Lennard	Progressive Conservative	1935, 1945	6th term*
York Centre	Fred C. Stinson	Progressive Conservative	1957	2nd term
York East	Robert Henry McGregor	Progressive Conservative	1926	9th term
York—Humber	Margaret Aitken	Progressive Conservative	1953	3rd term
York North	Cecil Cathers	Progressive Conservative	1957	2nd term
York—Scarborough	Frank Charles McGee	Progressive Conservative	1957	2nd term
York South	William George Beech	Progressive Conservative	1957	2nd term
York West	John Borden Hamilton	Progressive Conservative	1954	3rd term

==== Prince Edward Island ====
Electoral district	Name	Party	First elected/previously elected	No. of terms
King's	John Augustine Macdonald (died 4 January 1961)	Progressive Conservative	1957	2nd term
King's	Margaret Mary Macdonald (by-election of 1961-05-29)	Progressive Conservative	1961	1st term
Prince	Orville Howard Phillips	Progressive Conservative	1957	2nd term
Queen's*	**Angus MacLean**	Progressive Conservative	1951	4th term
Queen's*	Heath MacQuarrie	Progressive Conservative	1957	2nd term

==== Quebec ====
Electoral district	Name	Party	First elected/previously elected	No. of terms
Argenteuil—Deux-Montagnes	Joseph-Octave Latour	Progressive Conservative	1958	1st term
Beauce	Jean-Paul Racine	Liberal	1958	1st term
Beauharnois—Salaberry	Gérard Bruchési	Progressive Conservative	1958	1st term
Bellechasse	**Noël Dorion**	Progressive Conservative	1958	1st term
Berthier—Maskinongé—Delanaudière	Rémi Paul	Progressive Conservative	1958	1st term
Bonaventure	Lucien Grenier	Progressive Conservative	1958	1st term
Brome—Missisquoi	Heward Grafftey	Progressive Conservative	1958	1st term
Cartier	Leon Crestohl	Liberal	1950	4th term
Chambly—Rouville	Maurice Johnson	Progressive Conservative	1958	1st term
Champlain	Paul Lahaye	Progressive Conservative	1958	1st term
Chapleau	Jean-Jacques Martel	Progressive Conservative	1958	1st term
Charlevoix	Martial Asselin	Progressive Conservative	1958	1st term
Châteauguay—Huntingdon—Laprairie	Merrill Edwin Barrington	Progressive Conservative	1958	1st term
Chicoutimi	Vincent Brassard	Progressive Conservative	1958	1st term
Compton—Frontenac	George Stearns	Progressive Conservative	1958	1st term
Dollard	Guy Rouleau	Liberal	1953	3rd term
Dorchester	Noël Drouin	Progressive Conservative	1958	1st term
Drummond—Arthabaska	Samuel Boulanger	Liberal	1957	2nd term
Gaspé	Roland English ‡	Progressive Conservative	1957	2nd term
Gatineau	Rodolphe Leduc	Liberal	1936, 1954	5th term*
Hochelaga	Raymond Eudes	Liberal	1940	6th term
Hull	Alexis Caron	Liberal	1953	3rd term
Îles-de-la-Madeleine	Russell Keays	Progressive Conservative	1958	1st term
Jacques-Cartier—Lasalle	Robert John Pratt	Progressive Conservative	1957	2nd term
Joliette—l'Assomption—Montcalm	Louis-Joseph Pigeon	Progressive Conservative	1958	1st term
Kamouraska	Charles Richard	Progressive Conservative	1958	1st term
Labelle	**Henri Courtemanche** (until 20 January 1960 Senate appointment)	Progressive Conservative	1949, 1957	3rd term*
Labelle	Gaston Clermont (by-election of 1960-10-31)	Liberal	1960	1st term
Lac-Saint-Jean	Roger Parizeau	Progressive Conservative	1958	1st term
Lafontaine	J.-Georges Ratelle	Liberal	1949	4th term
Lapointe	Augustin Brassard	Liberal	1957	2nd term
Laurier	Lionel Chevrier	Liberal	1935, (Note: Stormont (Ontario)) 1957	7th term*
Laval	Rodrigue Bourdages	Progressive Conservative	1958	1st term
Lévis	Maurice Bourget	Liberal	1940	6th term
Longueuil	**Pierre Sévigny**	Progressive Conservative	1958	1st term
Lotbinière	**Raymond O'Hurley**	Progressive Conservative	1957	2nd term
Maisonneuve—Rosemont	Jean-Paul Deschatelets	Liberal	1953	3rd term
Matapédia—Matane	Alfred Belzile	Progressive Conservative	1958	1st term
Mégantic	Gabriel Roberge	Liberal	1958	1st term
Mercier	André Gillet	Progressive Conservative	1958	1st term
Montmagny—L'Islet	Jean Lesage (resigned 11 June 1958)	Liberal	1945	5th term
Montmagny—L'Islet	Louis Fortin (by-election of 1958-09-29)	Progressive Conservative	1958	1st term
Mount Royal	Alan Macnaughton	Liberal	1949	4th term
Nicolet—Yamaska	**Paul Comtois**	Progressive Conservative	1957	2nd term
Nicolet—Yamaska	Paul Comtois was appointed Lieutenant Governor of Quebec on October 12, 1961	Vacant		
Notre-Dame-de-Grâce	**William McLean Hamilton**	Progressive Conservative	1958	1st term
Outremont—St-Jean	Romuald Bourque	Liberal	1952	4th term
Papineau	Adrien Meunier	Liberal	1953	3rd term
Pontiac—Témiscamingue	Paul Martineau ‡	Progressive Conservative	1958	1st term
Portneuf	Aristide Rompré	Progressive Conservative	1958	1st term
Québec—Montmorency	Robert Lafrenière	Progressive Conservative	1958	1st term
Quebec East	Yvon Tassé ‡	Progressive Conservative	1958	1st term
Quebec South	**Jacques Flynn**	Progressive Conservative	1958	1st term
Quebec West	J.-Eugène Bissonnette	Progressive Conservative	1958	1st term
Richelieu—Verchères	Lucien Cardin	Liberal	1952	4th term
Richmond—Wolfe	V. Florent Dubois	Progressive Conservative	1958	1st term
Rimouski	Émilien Morissette	Progressive Conservative	1958	1st term
Roberval	Jean-Noël Tremblay	Progressive Conservative	1958	1st term
Saguenay	Perrault LaRue	Progressive Conservative	1958	1st term
St. Ann	Gérard Loiselle	Liberal	1957	2nd term
Saint-Antoine—Westmount	A. Ross Webster	Progressive Conservative	1958	1st term
Saint-Denis	Azellus Denis	Liberal	1935	7th term
Saint-Henri	H.-Pit Lessard	Liberal	1958	1st term
Saint-Hyacinthe—Bagot	Théogène Ricard ‡	Progressive Conservative	1957	2nd term
Saint-Jacques	Charles-Édouard Campeau	Progressive Conservative	1958	1st term
Saint-Jean—Iberville—Napierville	Yvon Dupuis	Liberal	1958	1st term
St. Lawrence—St. George	Egan Chambers ‡	Progressive Conservative	1958	1st term
Sainte-Marie	Georges Valade	Progressive Conservative	1958	1st term
Saint-Maurice—Laflèche	Joseph-Adolphe Richard	Liberal	1949	4th term
Shefford	Marcel Boivin	Liberal	1945	5th term
Sherbrooke	Maurice Allard	Progressive Conservative	1958	1st term
Stanstead	René Létourneau	Progressive Conservative	1958	1st term
Témiscouata	Antoine Fréchette	Progressive Conservative	1958	1st term
Terrebonne	Marcel Deschambault	Progressive Conservative	1958	1st term
Trois-Rivières	**Léon Balcer**	Progressive Conservative	1949	4th term
Vaudreuil—Soulanges	Marcel Bourbonnais	Progressive Conservative	1958	1st term
Verdun	Harold Monteith	Progressive Conservative	1958	1st term
Villeneuve	Armand Dumas	Liberal	1949	4th term

==== Saskatchewan ====
Electoral district	Name	Party	First elected/previously elected	No. of terms
Assiniboia	Hazen Argue	C.C.F.	1945	5th term
Assiniboia	Hazen Argue	New Democratic Party	1945	5th term
Assiniboia	Hazen Argue	Liberal	1945	5th term
Humboldt—Melfort	Reynold Rapp	Progressive Conservative	1958	1st term
Kindersley	Robert Hanbidge	Progressive Conservative	1958	1st term
Mackenzie	Stanley Korchinski	Progressive Conservative	1958	1st term
Meadow Lake	Bert Cadieu	Progressive Conservative	1958	1st term
Melville	James Ormiston	Progressive Conservative	1958	1st term
Moose Jaw—Lake Centre	J. Ernest Pascoe	Progressive Conservative	1958	1st term
Moose Mountain	Richard Southam	Progressive Conservative	1958	1st term
Prince Albert	**John Diefenbaker**	Progressive Conservative	1940	6th term
Qu'Appelle	**Alvin Hamilton**	Progressive Conservative	1957	2nd term
Regina City	Ken More	Progressive Conservative	1958	1st term
Rosetown—Biggar	Clarence Owen Cooper	Progressive Conservative	1958	1st term
Rosthern	Edward Nasserden	Progressive Conservative	1958	1st term
Saskatoon	Henry Frank Jones ‡	Progressive Conservative	1957	2nd term
Swift Current—Maple Creek	Jack McIntosh	Progressive Conservative	1958	1st term
The Battlefords	Albert Horner	Progressive Conservative	1958	1st term
Yorkton	G. Drummond Clancy	Progressive Conservative	1958	1st term

==== Yukon ====
Electoral district	Name	Party	First elected/previously elected	No. of terms
Yukon	Erik Nielsen	Progressive Conservative	1957	2nd term

== Major bills of the 24th Parliament ==
Important bills of the 24th parliament included:

- The Canadian Bill of Rights

== Legislation and motions ==
=== Act's which received royal assent under 24th Parliament ===
==== 1st Session ====
===== Public acts =====
Date of Assent	Index	Title	Bill Number
May 16, 1958	1	Appropriation Act No. 2, 1958	C-6
May 16, 1958	2	Unemployment Insurance Act - Temporary Extension to Seasonal Benefit Periods	C-9
May 20, 1958	3	National Housing Act, 1954, An Act to Amend the	C-10
June 5, 1958	4	Appropriation Act No. 3, 1958	C-22
June 26, 1958	5	Canada Agricultural Products Standards Act, An Act to Amend the	C-17
June 26, 1958	6	Hospital Insurance and Diagnostic Services Act, An Act to Amend the	C-30
July 25, 1958	7	British Columbia Coast Steamship Services Operated by the Canadian Pacific Railway Company, An Act to Provide for the Resumption of	C-42
July 25, 1958	8	National Parks Act Respecting Boundaries of Cape Breton Highlands National Park, An Act to Amend the	C-36
July 25, 1958	9	Yukon Act, An Act to Amend the	C-35
August 7, 1958	10	Appropriation Act No. 4, 1958	C-46
August 7, 1958	11	Animal Contagious Diseases Act, An Act to Amend the	C-41
August 7, 1958	12	Canada-Belgian Congo Income Tax Convention Act, 1958	C-29
August 7, 1958	13	Canada-Belgium Income Tax Convention Act, 1958	C-28
August 7, 1958	14	Canadian Farm Loan Act, An Act to Amend the	C-38
August 7, 1958	15	Prairie Farm Assistance Act, An Act to Amend the	C-40
August 7, 1958	16	Prairie Grain Advance Payments Act, An Act to Amend the	C-31
August 13, 1958	17	Canadian National Railways Financing and Guarantee Act, 1958	C-47
August 13, 1958	18	Criminal Code, An Act to Amend the	S-9
August 13, 1958	19	Indian Act, An Act to Amend the	C-24
August 13, 1958	20	Lake of the Woods Control Board Act, 1921, An Act to Amend the	C-25
September 6, 1958	21	Appropriation Act (Special), 1958	C-57
September 6, 1958	22	Broadcasting Act	C-55
September 6, 1958	23	Campobello-Lubec Bridge Act	C-56
September 6, 1958	24	Canadian Citizenship Act, An Act to Amend the	C-58
September 6, 1958	25	Children of War Dead (Education Assistance Act), An Act to Amend the	C-45
September 6, 1958	26	Customs Act, An Act to Amend the	C-51
September 6, 1958	27	Customs Tariff, An Act to Amend the	C-50
September 6, 1958	28	Emergency Gold Mining Assistance Act, An Act to Amend the	C-53
September 6, 1958	29	Estate Tax Act	C-37
September 6, 1958	30	Excise Tax Act, An Act to Amend the	C-44
September 6, 1958	31	Financial Administration Act, An Act to Amend the	C-43
September 6, 1958	32	Income Tax Act, An Act to Amend the	C-39
September 6, 1958	33	Judges Act, An Act to Amend the	C-59
September 6, 1958	34	Lakehead Harbour Commissioners Act	C-26
September 6, 1958	35	Loan Companies Act, An Act to Amend the	S-10
September 6, 1958	36	Maritime Coal Production Assistance Act, An Act to Authorize Certain Amendments to the Agreement with The Dominion Coal Company Limited	C-54
September 6, 1958	37	National Capital Act	C-48
September 6, 1958	38	Parole Act	C-49
September 6, 1958	39	Penitentiary Act, An Act to Amend the	C-21
September 6, 1958	40	Railway Act, An Act to Amend the	C-52
September 6, 1958	41	Returned Soldiers Insurance Act, An Act to Amend the	C-33
September 6, 1958	42	Trust Companies Act, An Act to Amend the	S-11
September 6, 1958	43	Veterans Insurance Act, An Act to Amend the	C-34
September 6, 1958	44	Appropriation Act No. 5 (Main Supply), 1958	C-61

===== Local and Private Acts =====
Date of Assent	Index	Title	Bill Number
June 26, August 7 and September 6, 1958	45	Burrard Inlet Tunnel and Bridge Company	S-4
June 26, August 7 and September 6, 1958	46	Ogdensburg Bridge Authority	S-12
June 26, August 7 and September 6, 1958	47	Mercantile and General Reinsurance Company of Canada Limited	S-3
June 26, August 7 and September 6, 1958	48	Protective Association of Canada	S-2
June 26, August 7 and September 6, 1958	49	Mid-Continent Pipelines Limited	S-15
June 26, August 7 and September 6, 1958	50	Stanmount Pipe Line Company	S-14
June 26, August 7 and September 6, 1958	51	Trans Mountain Oil Pipe Line Company	S-6
June 26, August 7 and September 6, 1958	52	Westcoast Transmission Company Limited	S-16
June 26, August 7 and September 6, 1958	53	Algoma Central and Hudson Bay Railway Company	S-13
June 26, August 7 and September 6, 1958	54	Canadian Pacific Railway Company and Certain Wholly Owned Subsidiaries	S-7
June 26, August 7 and September 6, 1958	55	Catholic Episcopal Corporation of Timiskaming	S-5
June 26, August 7 and September 6, 1958	56	Canadian Womens Press Club, An Act to Incorporate	S-8
June 26, August 7 and September 6, 1958	57	Toronto Board of Trade	S-17

==== 2nd Session ====
===== Public acts =====
Date of Assent	Index	Title	Bill Number
February 25, 1959	1	Appropriation Act No. 1, 1959	C-24
March 20, 1959	2	Appropriation Act No. 2, 1959	C-35
March 20, 1959	3	Appropriation Act No. 3, 1959	C-36
March 20, 1959	4	Fisheries Improvement Loans Act, An Act to amend	C-30
March 20, 1959	5	National Defence Act, An Act to amend	C-27
March 20, 1959	6	National Housing Act, 1954, An Act to amend	C-28
March 20, 1959	7	Northwest Territories Act, An Act to amend	C-26
March 20, 1959	8	Public Servants Inventions Act, An Act to amend	C-33
March 20, 1959	9	St. Lawrence Seaway Authority Act, An Act to amend	C-25
March 20, 1959	10	Trans-Canada Highway Act, An Act to amend	C-29
June 4, 1959	11	Appropriation Act No. 4, 1959	C-53
June 4, 1959	12	Customs Tariff and The New Zealand Trade Agreement Act, 1932, An Act to amend	C-44
June 4, 1959	13	Excise Act, An Act to amend	C-45
June 4, 1959	14	Old Age Security Act, An Act to amend	C-46
June 4, 1959	15	Parliamentary Secretaries Act	C-37
June 4, 1959	16	Representation Act, An Act to amend	C-21
June 4, 1959	17	Veterans Rehabilitation Act, An Act to amend	C-31
June 4, 1959	18	War Service Grants Act, An Act to amend	C-32
July 8, 1959	19	Bretton Woods Agreements Act, An Act to amend	C-52
July 8, 1959	20	Canada-Finland Income Tax Convention Act, 1959	C-54
July 8, 1959	21	Canadian Forces Superannuation Act	C-62
July 8, 1959	22	Canadian National Railways Financing and Guarantee Act, 1959	C-61
July 8, 1959	23	Excise Tax Act, An Act to amend	C-47
July 8, 1959	24	Export Credits Insurance Act, An Act to amend	S-22
July 8, 1959	25	Farm Improvement Loans Act, An Act to amend	C-63
July 8, 1959	26	Federal-Provincial Tax-Sharing Arrangements Act, An Act to amend	C-41
July 8, 1959	27	Freight Rates Reduction Act	C-38
July 8, 1959	28	Judges Act, An Act to amend	C-56
July 8, 1959	29	Length and Mass Units Act, An Act to amend	S-20
July 8, 1959	30	Prime Minister's Residence Act, An Act to amend	C-64
July 8, 1959	31	Prison and Reformatories Act, An Act to amend	S-26
July 8, 1959	32	Public Service Pension Adjustment Act	C-60
July 8, 1959	33	Queen Elizabeth II Canadian Research Fund Act	C-65
July 8, 1959	34	Royal Canadian Mounted Police Superannuation Act	C-57
July 8, 1959	35	Seeds Act	S-24
July 8, 1959	36	Unemployment Insurance Act, An Act to amend	C-43
July 8, 1959	37	Veterans' Land Act, An Act to amend	C-50
July 8, 1959	38	Weights and Measures Act, An Act to amend	S-21
July 18, 1959	39	Coal Production Assistance Act	C-68
July 18, 1959	40	Combines Investigation Act and the Criminal Code, An Act to amend	C-70
July 18, 1959	41	Criminal Code, An Act to amend	C-58
July 18, 1959	42	Crop Insurance Act	C-66
July 18, 1959	43	Farm Credit Act	C-67
July 18, 1959	44	Humane Slaughter of Food Animals Act	C-71
July 18, 1959	45	Income Tax Act, An Act to amend	C-48
July 18, 1959	46	National Energy Board Act	C-49
July 18, 1959	47	New Brunswick Indian Reserves Agreement	S-6
July 18, 1959	48	Newfoundland Additional Grants Act	C-72
July 18, 1959	49	Newfoundland Fisheries Laws respecting Exportation of Salt Fish, An Act to repeal	S-32
July 18, 1959	50	Nova Scotia Indian Reserves Agreement	S-25
July 18, 1959	51	Pigeon River Bridge Act	S-31
July 18, 1959	52	Public Lands Grants Act, An Act to amend	S-2
July 18, 1959	53	Queenston Bridge Act	S-30
July 18, 1959	54	Royal Canadian Mounted Police Act	C-34
July 18, 1959	55	Appropriation Act No. 5 (Main Supply), 1959	C-73

===== Local and Private Acts =====
Date of Assent	Index	Title	Bill Number
March 20, May 5, June 4, July 8, July 18, 1959	56	Baloise Fire Insurance Company of Canada	S-10
March 20, May 5, June 4, July 8, July 18, 1959	57	Boiler Inspection and Insurance Company of Canada	S-8
March 20, May 5, June 4, July 8, July 18, 1959	58	British Pacific Life Insurance Company	S-12
March 20, May 5, June 4, July 8, July 18, 1959	59	Co-operative Fire and Casualty Company	S-15
March 20, May 5, June 4, July 8, July 18, 1959	60	Desjardins Mutual Life Assurance Company	S-29
March 20, May 5, June 4, July 8, July 18, 1959	61	Gore District Mutual Fire Insurance Company	S-7
March 20, May 5, June 4, July 8, July 18, 1959	62	North American Accident Insurance Company	S-9
March 20, May 5, June 4, July 8, July 18, 1959	63	Waterloo Mutual Insurance Company	S-4
March 20, May 5, June 4, July 8, July 18, 1959	64	Foothills Pipe Lines Ltd.	S-16
March 20, May 5, June 4, July 8, July 18, 1959	65	Congregation of the Sisters of the Holy Family of Bordeaux in Canada	S-14
March 20, May 5, June 4, July 8, July 18, 1959	66	Evangelical Mennonite Conference	S-11
March 20, May 5, June 4, July 8, July 18, 1959	67	Free Methodist Church in Canada	S-27
March 20, May 5, June 4, July 8, July 18, 1959	68	Lutheran Church-Canada	S-18
March 20, May 5, June 4, July 8, July 18, 1959	69	Roman Catholic Episcopal Corporation of Prince Rupert	S-23
March 20, May 5, June 4, July 8, July 18, 1959	70	Standard Trust Company	S-28
March 20, May 5, June 4, July 8, July 18, 1959	71	Canadian General Council of The Boy Scouts Association	S-13
March 20, May 5, June 4, July 8, July 18, 1959	72	Canadian Legion of the British Empire Service League	S-19
March 20, May 5, June 4, July 8, July 18, 1959	73	Canadian Medical Association	S-5
March 20, May 5, June 4, July 8, July 18, 1959	74	Export Finance Corporation of Canada, Ltd.	S-17

==== 3rd Session ====
===== Public acts =====
Date of Assent	Index	Title	Bill Number
January 28, 1960	1	Prairie Grain Loans Act	C-35
January 28, 1960	2	Prairie Grain Provisional Payments Act	C-32
March 9, 1960	3	Appropriation Act No. 1, 1960	C-51
March 9, 1960	4	Department of Justice Act	C-47
March 31, 1960	5	Appropriation Act No. 2, 1960	C-54
March 31, 1960	6	Appropriation Act No. 3, 1960	C-55
March 31, 1960	7	Canada Elections Act, An Act to amend	C-3
March 31, 1960	8	Indian Act, An Act to amend	C-2
March 31, 1960	9	National Energy Board Act, An Act to amend	S-26
March 31, 1960	10	National Housing Act, An Act to amend	C-53
May 27, 1960	11	Appropriation Act No. 4, 1960	C-62
May 27, 1960	12	Export and Import Permits Act, An Act to amend	C-4
May 27, 1960	13	Federal-Provincial Tax-Sharing Arrangements Act, An Act to amend	C-56
May 27, 1960	14	Feeds Act	S-27
May 27, 1960	15	Fisheries Laws of Newfoundland, An Act to repeal	S-3
June 9, 1960	16	Appropriation Act No. 5, 1960	C-67
June 9, 1960	17	Australian Trade Agreement Act, 1960	S-28
June 9, 1960	18	Canada-Netherlands Income Tax Agreement Act, 1957, An Act to amend	S-2
June 9, 1960	19	Nanaimo Harbour Commissioners Act	S-10
June 9, 1960	20	Northwest Territories Act, An Act to amend	C-60
June 9, 1960	21	Oshawa Harbour Commissioners Act	S-5
June 9, 1960	22	Trans-Canada Highway Act, An Act to amend	C-57
June 9, 1960	23	Windsor Harbour Commissioners Act, An Act to amend	S-4
June 9, 1960	24	Yukon Act, An Act to amend	C-59
July 7, 1960	25	Canadian National Railways Financing and Guarantee Act, 1960	C-69
July 7, 1960	26	Canadian National Toronto Terminals Act	C-72
July 7, 1960	27	Customs Tariff, An Act to amend	C-74
July 7, 1960	28	Emergency Gold Mining Assistance Act, An Act to amend	C-64
July 7, 1960	29	Estate Tax Act, An Act to amend	C-65
July 7, 1960	30	Excise Tax Act, An Act to amend	C-73
July 7, 1960	31	International Boundary Commission Act	S-35
July 7, 1960	32	International Development Association Act	C-70
July 7, 1960	33	LaSalle-Caughnawaga Bridge Act	S-32
July 7, 1960	34	Old Age Security Act, An Act to amend	C-63
July 7, 1960	35	Railway Act, An Act to amend	C-61
July 7, 1960	36	War Veterans Allowance Act, 1952, An Act to amend	C-71
July 14, 1960	37	Criminal Code, An Act to amend	S-36
July 14, 1960	38	Public Service Superannuation Act, An Act to amend	C-76
August 1, 1960	39	Canada Elections Act	C-83
August 1, 1960	40	Canada Shipping Act, An Act to amend	C-80
August 1, 1960	41	Department of Forestry Act	C-82
August 1, 1960	42	Freight Rates Reduction Act, An Act to amend	C-81
August 1, 1960	43	Income Tax Act, An Act to amend	C-68
August 10, 1960	44	Canadian Bill of Rights	C-79
August 10, 1960	45	Combines Investigation Act and the Criminal Code, An Act to amend	C-58
August 10, 1960	46	Judges Act, An Act to amend	C-78
August 10, 1960	47	Judges Act, An Act to amend	C-89
August 10, 1960	48	Appropriation Act No. 6, 1960 (Main Supply)	C-90

===== Local and Private Acts =====
Date of Assent	Index	Title	Bill Number
March 9, March 31, May 27, July 7, July 14, August 1, 1960	49	Adanac General Insurance Company of Canada, An Act to incorporate	S-18
March 9, March 31, May 27, July 7, July 14, August 1, 1960	50	Allstate Insurance Company of Canada, An Act to incorporate	S-29
March 9, March 31, May 27, July 7, July 14, August 1, 1960	51	Canadian Reassurance Company, An Act to incorporate	S-13
March 9, March 31, May 27, July 7, July 14, August 1, 1960	52	Montreal Life Insurance Company, An Act respecting	S-11
March 9, March 31, May 27, July 7, July 14, August 1, 1960	53	Munich Reinsurance Company of Canada, An Act to incorporate	S-14
March 9, March 31, May 27, July 7, July 14, August 1, 1960	54	United Canada Insurance Company, An Act to incorporate	S-7
March 9, March 31, May 27, July 7, July 14, August 1, 1960	55	Wawanesa Mutual Insurance Company, An Act respecting the	S-34
March 9, March 31, May 27, July 7, July 14, August 1, 1960	56	Wawanesa Mutual Life Insurance Company, An Act to incorporate the	S-33
March 9, March 31, May 27, July 7, July 14, August 1, 1960	57	Western Surety Company, An Act to incorporate	S-30
March 9, March 31, May 27, July 7, July 14, August 1, 1960	58	International Loan Company, An Act respecting	S-23
March 9, March 31, May 27, July 7, July 14, August 1, 1960	59	Laurentide Finance Company, An Act to incorporate	S-22
March 9, March 31, May 27, July 7, July 14, August 1, 1960	60	Matador Pipe Line Company, Ltd., An Act to incorporate	S-16
March 9, March 31, May 27, July 7, July 14, August 1, 1960	61	Northern Pipe Line Company, An Act to incorporate	S-31
March 9, March 31, May 27, July 7, July 14, August 1, 1960	62	Algoma Central and Hudson Bay Railway Company, An Act respecting the	S-12
March 9, March 31, May 27, July 7, July 14, August 1, 1960	63	Wabush Lake Railway Company Limited and Arnaud Railway Company, An Act respecting	S-24
March 9, March 31, May 27, July 7, July 14, August 1, 1960	64	British and Foreign Bible Society in Canada, An Act respecting the	S-8
March 9, March 31, May 27, July 7, July 14, August 1, 1960	65	Evangelical Lutheran Church of Canada, An Act to incorporate the	S-19
March 9, March 31, May 27, July 7, July 14, August 1, 1960	66	British Columbia Telephone Company, An Act respecting	S-20
March 9, March 31, May 27, July 7, July 14, August 1, 1960	67	Eastern Telephone and Telegraph Company, An Act respecting	S-21
March 9, March 31, May 27, July 7, July 14, August 1, 1960	68	Canadian Public Health Association, An Act respecting the	S-9
March 9, March 31, May 27, July 7, July 14, August 1, 1960	69	College of General Practice of Canada, An Act to incorporate the	S-15
March 9, March 31, May 27, July 7, July 14, August 1, 1960	70	National Sanitarium Association, An Act respecting the	S-17

==== 4th Session ====
===== Public acts =====
Date of Assent	Index	Title	Bill Number
December 2, 1960	1	National Housing Act, 1954, An Act to amend	C-42
December 2, 1960	2	Railway Operation Continuation Act	C-45
December 20, 1960	3	Appropriation Act No. 7, 1960	C-55
December 20, 1960	4	National Productivity Council Act	C-52
December 20, 1960	5	Small Businesses Loans Act	C-40
December 20, 1960	6	Technical and Vocational Training Assistance Act	C-49
March 9, 1961	7	Canadian National Railway Company, Construction of a line of railway in Province of Quebec from Kiask Falls Subdivision to vicinity of Mattagami Lake	C-69
March 9, 1961	8	Halifax Signal Station, An Act to repeal certain laws relating to	S-3
March 9, 1961	9	Indian Act, An Act to amend	C-61
March 9, 1961	10	Pension Act, An Act to amend	C-67
March 29, 1961	11	Appropriation Act No. 1, 1961	C-78
March 29, 1961	12	Appropriation Act No. 2, 1961	C-80
March 29, 1961	13	Canadian and British Insurance Companies Act, An Act to amend	S-5
March 29, 1961	14	Coastal Fisheries Protection Act, An Act to amend	C-57
March 29, 1961	15	Fire Losses Replacement Account Act, An Act to amend	C-47
March 29, 1961	16	Foreign Insurance Companies Act, An Act to amend	S-6
March 29, 1961	17	Income Tax Act, An Act to amend	C-73
March 29, 1961	18	Tariff Board Act, An Act to amend	C-74
June 1, 1961	19	Canada-United States of America Estate Tax Convention Act, 1961	C-82
June 1, 1961	20	Coal Production Assistance Act, An Act to authorize certain amendments to the Agreement made with Bras d'Or Coal Company Limited	C-87
June 1, 1961	21	Criminal Code (Race Meetings), An Act to amend	C-89
June 1, 1961	22	Farm Improvement Loans Act, An Act to amend	C-95
June 1, 1961	23	Fisheries Act, An Act to amend	C-86
June 1, 1961	24	National Design Council Act	C-85
June 1, 1961	25	Representation Act, An Act to amend	C-29
June 1, 1961	26	Vocational Rehabilitation of Disabled Persons Act	C-84
June 8, 1961	27	Appropriation Act No. 3, 1961	C-103
June 8, 1961	28	Canadian National Railways Act, An Act to amend	C-94
June 8, 1961	29	Freight Rates Reduction Act, An Act to amend	C-93
June 22, 1961	30	Agricultural Rehabilitation and Development Act	C-77
June 22, 1961	31	Army Benevolent Fund Act, An Act to amend	C-88
June 22, 1961	32	Canada Shipping Act, An Act to amend	C-98
June 22, 1961	33	Export Credits Insurance Act, An Act to amend	C-108
June 22, 1961	34	Government Property Traffic Act, An Act to amend	S-24
June 22, 1961	35	Control of Narcotic Drugs, An Act to provide for	C-100
June 22, 1961	36	Farm Credit Act, An Act to amend	C-107
June 22, 1961	37	Food and Drugs Act, An Act to amend	C-99
June 22, 1961	38	Judges Act and the Exchequer Court Act, An Act to amend	C-104
June 22, 1961	39	War Veterans Allowance Act, 1952, An Act to amend	C-101
July 13, 1961	40	Appropriation Act No. 4, 1961	C-123
July 13, 1961	41	Canadian National Railways Financing and Guarantee Act, 1961	C-121
July 13, 1961	42	Combines Investigation Act and Criminal Code, An Act to amend	C-97
July 13, 1961	43	Criminal Code, An Act to amend	C-110
July 13, 1961	44	Criminal Code (Capital Murder), An Act to amend	C-92
July 13, 1961	45	Customs Tariff, An Act to amend	C-116
July 13, 1961	46	Excise Act, An Act to amend	C-115
July 13, 1961	47	Excise Tax Act, An Act to amend	C-118
July 13, 1961	48	Financial Administration Act, An Act to amend	C-109
July 13, 1961	49	Income Tax Act, An Act to amend	C-120
July 13, 1961	50	Industrial Development Bank Act, An Act to amend	C-117
July 13, 1961	51	Loan Companies Act, An Act to amend	S-29
July 13, 1961	52	National Energy Board Act, An Act to amend	C-113
July 13, 1961	53	Penitentiary Act	C-105
July 13, 1961	54	Railway Act, An Act to amend	C-111
July 13, 1961	55	Trust Companies Act, An Act to amend	S-28
September 29, 1961	56	Canadian National Railway Company, construction of a line of railway in Province of Alberta and Northwest Territories from Grimshaw, Alta., to Great Slave Lake	C-126
September 29, 1961	57	Civil Service Act	C-71
September 29, 1961	58	Federal Provincial Fiscal Arrangements Act	C-122
September 29, 1961	59	Fitness and Amateur Sport Act	C-131
September 29, 1961	60	National Centennial Act	C-127
September 29, 1961	61	National Housing Act, 1954, An Act to amend	C-128
September 29, 1961	62	Natural Resources Transfer (School Lands) Amendment Act, 1961	C-129
September 29, 1961	63	Transport Act, An Act to amend	C-33
September 29, 1961	64	Appropriation Act No. 5, 1961 (Main Supply)	C-132

===== Local and Private Acts =====
Date of Assent	Index	Title	Bill Number
March 9, March 29, June 1, June 22, July 13, September 29, 1961	65	Trois-Rivières, An Act respecting the construction of a bridge over the St. Lawrence River near the City of	S-15
March 9, March 29, June 1, June 22, July 13, September 29, 1961	66	Acadia Life Insurance Company, An Act to incorporate	S-22
March 9, March 29, June 1, June 22, July 13, September 29, 1961	67	Canadian General Insurance Company, An Act respecting	S-14
March 9, March 29, June 1, June 22, July 13, September 29, 1961	68	Canadian Pioneer Insurance Company, An Act respecting	S-10
March 9, March 29, June 1, June 22, July 13, September 29, 1961	69	Co-operative Life Insurance Company, An Act respecting	S-12
March 9, March 29, June 1, June 22, July 13, September 29, 1961	70	Equitable General Insurance Company, An Act to incorporate	S-30
March 9, March 29, June 1, June 22, July 13, September 29, 1961	71	Aurora Pipe Line Company, An Act to incorporate	S-2
March 9, March 29, June 1, June 22, July 13, September 29, 1961	72	Canadian Pacific Railway Company, An Act respecting	S-13
March 9, March 29, June 1, June 22, July 13, September 29, 1961	73	Canadian Pacific Railway Company, An Act respecting	S-17
March 9, March 29, June 1, June 22, July 13, September 29, 1961	74	Cumberland Railway and Coal Company and the Sydney and Louisburg Railway Company, An Act respecting	S-19
March 9, March 29, June 1, June 22, July 13, September 29, 1961	75	Congregation of the Sisters of the Holy Family of Bordeaux in Canada	S-26
March 9, March 29, June 1, June 22, July 13, September 29, 1961	76	Ukrainian Evangelical Baptist Convention of Canada, An Act to incorporate	S-18
March 9, March 29, June 1, June 22, July 13, September 29, 1961	77	Canada Permanent Trust Company, An Act respecting	S-25
March 9, March 29, June 1, June 22, July 13, September 29, 1961	78	General Mortgage Service Corporation of Canada, An Act to incorporate	S-16
March 9, March 29, June 1, June 22, July 13, September 29, 1961	79	Guaranty Trust Company of Canada, An Act respecting	S-27
March 9, March 29, June 1, June 22, July 13, September 29, 1961	80	Canadian Council of The Girl Guides Association, An Act respecting	S-20
March 9, March 29, June 1, June 22, July 13, September 29, 1961	81	Canadian Federation of Music Teachers' Association, An Act to incorporate	S-8
March 9, March 29, June 1, June 22, July 13, September 29, 1961	82	Canadian General Council of the Boy Scouts Association, An Act respecting	S-11
March 9, March 29, June 1, June 22, July 13, September 29, 1961	83	Canadian Legion, An Act respecting	S-23
March 9, March 29, June 1, June 22, July 13, September 29, 1961	84	International Brain Research Organization, An Act to incorporate	S-9
March 9, March 29, June 1, June 22, July 13, September 29, 1961	85	Queen's University of Kingston, An Act respecting	S-7

==== 5th Session ====
===== Public acts =====
Date of Assent	Index	Title	Bill Number
February 7, 1962	1	Appropriation Act No. 1, 1962	C-51
February 15, 1962	2	Blind Persons Act, An Act to amend	C-56
February 15, 1962	3	Disabled Persons Act, An Act to amend	C-62
February 15, 1962	4	Old Age Assistance Act, An Act to amend	C-55
February 15, 1962	5	Old Age Security Act, An Act to amend	C-54
February 15, 1962	6	Veterans Insurance Act, An Act to amend	C-37
February 15, 1962	7	War Service Grants Act, An Act to amend	C-36
February 23, 1962	8	Canadian National Railway—Construction of a line of railway from Optic Lake to Chisel Lake and Purchase from the International Nickel Company of Canada, Limited, of a line of railway from Sipiwesk to a point on Burntwood River near Mystery Lake—all in the Province of Manitoba	C-48
February 23, 1962	9	Canadian National Railway—Construction of a line of railway from Whitecourt, Alberta in a westerly direction for a distance of approximately 23.2 miles to the property of Pan American Petroleum Corporation	C-63
February 23, 1962	10	Children of War Dead (Education Assistance) Act, An Act to amend	C-65
February 23, 1962	11	Civilian War Pensions and Allowances Act, An Act to amend	C-64
March 23, 1962	12	Appropriation Act No. 2, 1962	C-78
March 23, 1962	13	Canadian National Railway—Construction of a line of railway in the Province of Quebec between Matane and Ste. Anne des Monts	C-67
March 23, 1962	14	Export Credits Insurance Act, An Act to amend	C-68
March 23, 1962	15	Farm Improvement Loans Act, An Act to amend	C-73
March 23, 1962	16	Fisheries Improvement Loans Act, An Act to amend	C-74
March 23, 1962	17	Representation Act, An Act to amend	C-14
March 23, 1962	18	St. Lawrence Seaway Authority Act, An Act to amend	C-66
March 23, 1962	19	Small Businesses Loans Act, An Act to amend	C-49
April 5, 1962	20	Appropriation Act No. 3, 1962	C-85
April 5, 1962	21	Canadian Wheat Board Act, An Act to amend	C-75
April 5, 1962	22	Judges Act, An Act to amend	C-84
April 18, 1962	23	Appropriation Act No. 4, 1962	C-89
April 18, 1962	24	Appropriation Act No. 5, 1962 (Interim)	C-90
April 18, 1962	25	Canada Grain Act, An Act to amend	S-19
April 18, 1962	26	Corporations and Labour Unions Returns Act	C-38
April 18, 1962	27	Customs Act, An Act to amend	C-79
April 18, 1962	28	Representation Act, An Act to amend	C-46
April 18, 1962	29	Veterans' Land Act, An Act to amend	C-80

===== Local and Private Acts =====
Date of Assent	Index	Title	Bill Number
March 23, April 5, April 18, 1962	30	Canada Security Assurance Company, An Act respecting	S-14
March 23, April 5, April 18, 1962	31	Canadian Indemnity Company and the Canadian Fire Insurance Company, An Act respecting The	S-15
March 23, April 5, April 18, 1962	32	Mutual Life Assurance Company of Canada, An Act respecting The	S-3
March 23, April 5, April 18, 1962	33	Reliance Insurance Company of Canada, An Act respecting	S-12
March 23, April 5, April 18, 1962	34	Sun Life Assurance Company of Canada, An Act respecting	S-8
March 23, April 5, April 18, 1962	35	Westmount Life Insurance Company, An Act to incorporate	S-4
March 23, April 5, April 18, 1962	36	Cochin Pipe Lines Ltd., An Act to incorporate	S-6
March 23, April 5, April 18, 1962	37	Polaris Pipe Lines, An Act to incorporate	S-13
March 23, April 5, April 18, 1962	38	Canadian Pacific Railway Company and certain wholly owned subsidiaries, An Act respecting	S-17
March 23, April 5, April 18, 1962	39	Evangelical Mennonite Mission Conference, An Act to incorporate	S-5
March 23, April 5, April 18, 1962	40	Salvation Army, Canada East, and The Governing Council of The Salvation Army, Canada West, An Act respecting The Governing Council of The	S-11
March 23, April 5, April 18, 1962	41	United Church of Canada, An Act respecting The	S-16
March 23, April 5, April 18, 1962	42	Brock Acceptance Company, An Act to incorporate	S-9
March 23, April 5, April 18, 1962	43	Gerand Acceptance Company, An Act to incorporate	S-10
March 23, April 5, April 18, 1962	44	Greymac Mortgage Corporation, An Act to incorporate	S-18
March 23, April 5, April 18, 1962	45	Muttart Development Corporation Ltd., An Act respecting	S-7

== See also ==
- List of Canadian electoral districts 1952-1966 for a list of the ridings in this parliament.
