= Siegfried Enns =

Russian-born Canadian politician (1924–2020)

- Official 1966 portrait

Member of Parliament for Portage—Neepawa
- In office 18 June 1962 – 24 June 1968
- Preceded by: George Fairfield
- Succeeded by: Riding abolished

Personal details
- Born: Siegfried John Enns; 26 April 1924 Sokolivka, Ukrainian SSR, Soviet Union
- Died: 20 January 2020 (aged 95) Winnipeg, Manitoba, Canada
- Party: Progressive Conservative
- Spouse: Vera Loewen (m. 1949; died 2010)
- Children: 4
- Education: University of Manitoba (BA, BEd, BSW)
- Profession: Social worker; administrator

Siegfried John Enns (26 April 1924 – 25 January 2020) was a Progressive Conservative party member of the House of Commons of Canada. He was a social worker by career.

He was first elected at the Portage—Neepawa riding in the 1962 general election, then re-elected there in 1963 and 1965. With riding boundary changes, Enns sought re-election at the Portage riding for the 1968 election but was defeated by Gerald Cobbe of the Liberal party. He died on 25 January 2020, aged 95.

His brother Harry Enns was a long-serving (1966–2003) member of the Legislative Assembly of Manitoba.
