= List of members of the Canadian House of Commons with military service (E) =

Name	Elected party	Constituency	Elected date	Military service
Manley Justin Edwards	Liberal	Calgary West	March 26, 1940	Canadian Army
René Émard	Liberal	Vaudreuil—Soulanges	April 8, 1963	Canadian Army
Alexander Thomas Embury	Conservative	Hastings—Peterborough	October 29, 1925	British Army
Henry Read Emmerson	Liberal	Westmorland	October 14, 1935	Canadian Army, British Army
Frank A. Enfield	Liberal	York—Scarborough	August 10, 1953	Royal Canadian Air Force (1943-1945)
William Gordon Ernst	Conservative	Queens—Lunenburg	September 14, 1926	Canadian Army
