= John Finlay (Canadian politician) =

Canadian politician

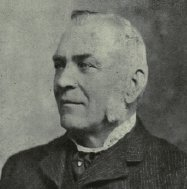

Member of the Canadian Parliament for Peterborough East
- In office 1904–1908
- Preceded by: John Lang
- Succeeded by: John Albert Sexsmith

Personal details
- Born: April 22, 1837 Dummer Township, Peterborough County, Upper Canada
- Died: November 13, 1910 (aged 73)
- Party: Liberal

John Finlay (April 22, 1837 – November 13, 1910) was a Canadian politician.

Born in Dummer Township, Peterborough County, Upper Canada, Finlay was educated in the Public Schools of Dummer. A manufacturer, Finlay was Councillor and Reeve of the Village of Norwood and County Councillor. He was elected to the House of Commons of Canada for the electoral district of Peterborough East in the general elections of 1904. A Liberal, he did not run in the 1908 elections.
