= John Mouat Turner =

Canadian politician

Member of Parliament for Springfield
- In office 1935–1945
- Preceded by: Thomas Hay
- Succeeded by: John Sinnott

Personal details
- Born: 28 May 1900 Beausejour, Manitoba
- Died: 24 February 1945 (aged 44) Selkirk, Manitoba
- Party: Liberal
- Spouse: Rose Olinzek
- Profession: hotel manager, beer salesman

John Mouat Turner (28 May 1900 – 24 February 1945) was a Canadian politician.

== Life ==
He was born in Beausejour, Manitoba, sold brewery products for a living, and worked as a hotel manager in Winnipeg. He was first elected to the House of Commons of Canada in the 1935 federal election representing the Manitoba riding of Springfield as a Liberal. He was re-elected in the 1940 federal election. He was nominated to run in the 1945 federal election but died of a heart attack several months before the election.

In Parliament, he was an advocate for rural electrification, the development of natural resources, the lifting of restrictions on beer, and the development of industry in Western Canada.
