= George Arthur Brethen =

Canadian politician

Member of the Canadian Parliament for Peterborough East
- In office 1921–1925
- Preceded by: John Albert Sexsmith
- Succeeded by: Riding redistributed between Hastings—Peterborough and Peterborough West

Personal details
- Born: August 29, 1877 Norwood, Ontario, Canada
- Died: January 31, 1968 (aged 90)
- Party: Progressive Party
- Occupation: farmer

George Arthur Brethen (born August 29, 1877 in Norwood, Ontario, Canada-died January 31, 1968) was a Canadian politician and farmer. He was elected to the House of Commons of Canada as a Member of the Progressive Party in the 1921 election to represent the riding of Peterborough East. He was defeated in the 1925 election in the riding of Hastings—Peterborough.
