= Richard Coe Henders =

Canadian politician

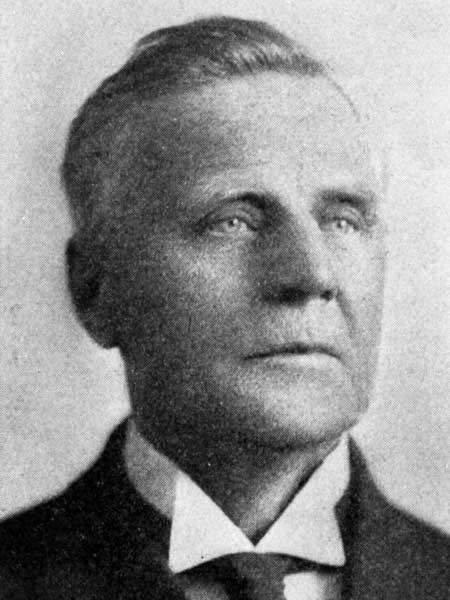

Member of the Canada Parliament for Macdonald
- In office March 18, 1918 – November 4, 1921
- Preceded by: Alexander Morrison
- Succeeded by: William James Lovie

Personal details
- Born: July 6, 1853 Yelverton, Canada West
- Died: May 2, 1932 (aged 78) Winnipeg, Manitoba, Canada
- Party: Unionist
- Spouse: Caroline S. Higgins

Richard Coe Henders (July 6, 1853 – May 2, 1932) was a Canadian farmer, Methodist minister, and politician.

Born in Yelverton, Canada West, the son of Henry Henders and Frances Coe, Henders attended Bowmanville High School and Victoria University in Cobourg, Ontario. A Methodist minister for twenty years, he was a farmer in Winnipeg. He was President of the Manitoba Grain Growers' Association and vice-president of the Canadian Council of Agriculture. He was elected to the House of Commons of Canada for Macdonald in 1917. A Unionist, he did not seek re-election in 1921.

He died in 1932 in Winnipeg.
