= George Fairfield =

Canadian politician

George Clark Fairfield

Member of Parliament for Portage—Neepawa
- In office June 1957 – April 1962
- Preceded by: William Gilbert Weir
- Succeeded by: Siegfried Enns

Personal details
- Born: 24 June 1912 Winnipeg, Manitoba
- Died: 9 November 1978 (aged 66) Portage la Prairie, Manitoba
- Party: Progressive Conservative
- Spouse: Stella Madill (m. 10 September 1938 – 9 Nov 1978)
- Profession: physician, surgeon

George Clark Fairfield (24 June 1912 – 9 November 1978) was a Progressive Conservative member of the House of Commons of Canada. He was a physician and surgeon by career, after graduating from the University of Manitoba.

He was first elected at the Portage—Neepawa riding in the 1957 general election and re-elected for a second term in the 1958 election, serving in the 23rd and 24th Parliaments. He served as a backbench supporter of Prime Minister John Diefenbaker's government. After finishing his second term, Fairfield did not campaign for further terms in federal office.
