= Rork Scott Ferguson =

Canadian politician (1884–1955)

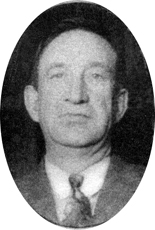
- Rork Scott Ferguson in 1936

Member of Parliament for Hastings—Peterborough
- In office October 1935 – March 1940
- Preceded by: Alexander Thomas Embury
- Succeeded by: George Stanley White

Personal details
- Born: Thomas Rork Scott Ferguson; 10 February 1884 Peterborough County, Ontario
- Died: 4 March 1955 (aged 71) Peterborough, Ontario
- Party: Liberal
- Spouse(s): Ethel Beatrice Jenkins m. 24 April 1912
- Children: 1
- Profession: farmer

Thomas Rork Scott Ferguson (10 February 1884 – 4 March 1955) was a Liberal party member of the House of Commons of Canada. He was born in Peterborough County, Ontario and became a farmer.

Ferguson attended high school at Norwood. In 1934, Ferguson was a regional reeve of Dummer and Asphodel Townships. He also became a Peterborough County Warden in that year.

He was first elected to Parliament at the Hastings—Peterborough riding in the 1935 general election. After serving one term, the 18th Canadian Parliament, Ferguson was defeated by George Stanley White of the National Government party. In the 1945 election, Ferguson was unsuccessful in unseating White.

Ferguson was married and had a daughter.
