= William James Lovie =

Canadian politician

Member of the Canada Parliament for Macdonald
- In office March 8, 1922 – May 30, 1930
- Preceded by: Richard Coe Henders
- Succeeded by: William Gilbert Weir

Personal details
- Born: December 30, 1868 Skene, Aberdeenshire, Scotland
- Died: November 24, 1938 (aged 69) Holland, Manitoba, Canada
- Party: Progressive
- Spouse: Mary Jane Gordon

William James Lovie (December 30, 1868 – November 24, 1938) was a Canadian farmer and politician.

Born in Aberdeenshire, Scotland, the son of James Lovie and Isabella Moir, Lovie attended Skene Parish Common School in Aberdeenshire before emigrating to Canada in 1885. He settled in Holland, Manitoba where he was a farmer. He was Secretary-Treasurer of the United Farmers of Manitoba for 18 years. He was first elected to the House of Commons of Canada for Macdonald in 1921. A Progressive, he was re-elected in 1925 and 1926. He did not run for re-election in 1930. He died in 1938 in Holland, Manitoba.
