= Edgar Douglas Richmond Bissett =

Canadian politician

Member of Parliament for Springfield
- In office September 14, 1926 – July 27, 1930
- Preceded by: Thomas Hay
- Succeeded by: Thomas Hay

Personal details
- Born: May 3, 1890 Louisbourg, Nova Scotia, Canada
- Died: January 14, 1990 (aged 99)
- Party: Liberal-Progressive
- Profession: Physician, surgeon

Edgar Douglas Richmond Bissett (May 3, 1890 – January 14, 1990) was a Liberal-Progressive Member of Parliament in the House of Commons of Canada.

A surgeon by profession, Bissett first ran for federal office in the 1925 federal election as a Liberal candidate in Springfield, Manitoba but was defeated. He ran again in 1926 as a Liberal-Progressive and was successful against Conservative incumbent Thomas Hay and Labour candidate Thomas Dunn. He sat as a backbench supporter of the Liberal government of William Lyon Mackenzie King until he was defeated in the 1930 federal election.

His daughter, Joan Bissett Neiman, was a Liberal Senator from 1972 to 1995.

The mining community of Bissett, Manitoba was named for him.
