= John Burnham (Canadian politician) =

Canadian politician

Member of the Canadian Parliament for Peterborough East
- In office 1878–1887
- Preceded by: James Hall
- Succeeded by: John Lang
- In office 1891–1896
- Preceded by: John Lang
- Succeeded by: John Lang

Personal details
- Born: 3 December 1842 St. Thomas, Canada West
- Died: 29 December 1897 (aged 55) Ashburnham, Ontario
- Party: Conservative

John Burnham (3 December 1842 – 29 December 1897) was a Canadian physician and politician from the province of Ontario.

Born in St. Thomas, Canada West, the son of Mark Burnham, he came to the County of Peterborough with his father in 1852, and located in the Village of Ashburnham. He received his medical education in Toronto and graduated in 1862, when he commenced practice in Ashburnham. He was a captain in the 57th Regiment of Canadian Volunteer Militia, "Peterborough Rangers".

He was first elected to the House of Commons of Canada in the 1878 election for the riding of Peterborough East. A Conservative, he was re-elected in the 1882 election. He was defeated in the 1887 election and was re-elected in the 1891 election. He was defeated again in the 1896 election. He was also reeve of Ashburnham Township.

In 1868, he married Maria Rogers. Burnham died in Ashburnham at the age of 56.
