= John Sinnott (politician) =

Canadian politician

Member of Parliament for Springfield
- In office June 1945 – August 1953
- Preceded by: John Mouat Turner
- Succeeded by: Anton Weselak

Personal details
- Born: John Sylvester Aloysius Sinnott; 9 May 1905 Saint-Ouens, Manitoba, Canada
- Died: 10 August 1960 (aged 55) Saint-Ouens, Manitoba, Canada
- Party: Liberal
- Spouse(s): Florence Robson (m. 7 December 1928)
- Profession: Farmer, implement agent

John Sylvester Aloysius Sinnott (9 May 1905 – 10 August 1960) was a Liberal party member of the House of Commons of Canada. He was born in Saint-Ouens, Manitoba and became a farmer and implement agent.

Sinnott attended school in Saint-Ouens, then studied at Manitoba Agricultural College. From 1936 to 1944 and again from 1950 to 1951, he served as reeve of Brokenhead, Manitoba.

He was first elected to Parliament at the Springfield riding in the 1945 general election then re-elected for a second term in 1949.

In 1952, Sinnott voted for the creation of a pension for Members of Parliament of $3,000 per year if the MP has served in parliament for at least 17 years. This proved unpopular in his riding and he was defeated in his attempt to win his party's nomination for the following election. He then reversed his previous position and led a fight in the House of Commons against the creation of pensions for Members of Parliament and introduced a bill to make MP salaries fully taxable. He opposed the government on a number of measures. The local Liberal Party defeated his attempt to win the party's nomination for the next election and he ran as an Independent Liberal instead.

In the 1953 election, Sinnott ran as an Independent Liberal candidate and was defeated by Anton Weselak of the Liberal party.
