= Results of the 1926 Canadian federal election =

1926 Canadian federal election

== Results by Province and Territory ==
=== Alberta ===
Results in Alberta
Party	Seats	Second	Third	Votes	%	+/-
United Farmers of Alberta	11	0	1	60,740	38.68	
Conservative	1	11	1	49,514	31.53	
Liberals	3	4	1	35,073	22.34	
Labour	1	0	0	6,707	4.27	
Unknown	0	1	0	3,378	2.15	
Labour Farmer	0	0	1	1,441	0.92	
Independent	0	0	1	163	0.1	
Total	16			157,016	100.0	

=== British Columbia ===
Results in British Columbia
Party	Seats	Second	Third	Fourth	Votes	%	+/-
Conservative	12	2	0	0	100,066	54.25	
Liberals	1	12	0	0	68,317	37.03	
Labour	0	0	7	0	11,757	6.37	
Independent	1	0	0	1	4,330	2.35	
Total	14				184,470	100.0	

=== Manitoba ===
Results in Manitoba
Party	Seats	Second	Third	Votes	%	+/-
Conservative	0	16	0	83,100	42.18	
Liberal-Progressive	7	0	0	38,379	19.48	
Liberals	4	0	1	36,242	18.4	
Progressive	4	0	0	22,092	11.21	
Labour	2	0	2	17,194	8.73	
Total	17			197,007	100.0	

=== New Brunswick ===
Results in New Brunswick
Party	Seats	Second	Third	Votes	%	+/-
Conservative	7	4	0	87,080	53.9	
Liberals	4	6	1	74,465	46.1	
Total	11			161,545	100.0	

=== Nova Scotia ===
Results in Nova Scotia
Party	Seats	Second	Third	Votes	%	+/-
Conservative	12	2	0	122,965	53.71	
Liberals	2	10	1	99,581	43.49	
Labour	0	1	0	6,412	2.8	
Total	14			228,958	100.0	

=== Ontario ===
Results in Ontario
Party	Seats	Second	Third	Fourth	Votes	%	+/-
Conservative	53	28	2	0	671,353	54.93	
Liberals	24	37	3	0	431,690	35.32	
Progressive	3	7	3	0	62,009	5.07	
Liberal-Progressive	0	3	0	0	13,997	1.15	
Labour	1	1	3	0	13,591	1.11	
Independent Conservative	0	2	0	0	9,389	0.77	
United Farmers of Ontario	1	0	0	0	6,909	0.57	
Independent	0	1	1	1	5,991	0.49	
Liberal Labour Progressive	0	1	0	0	4,187	0.34	
Liberal-Labour	0	1	0	0	2,990	0.24	
Total	82				1,222,106	100.0	

=== Prince Edward Island ===
Results in Prince Edward Island
Party	Seats	Second	Third	Votes	%	+/-
Liberals	3	1	0	29,222	52.71	
Conservative	1	2	1	26,217	47.29	
Total	4			55,439	100.0	

=== Quebec ===
Results in Quebec
Party	Seats	Second	Third	Fourth	Votes	%	+/-
Liberals	59	4	1	0	492,566	61.31	
Conservative	4	57	1	0	275,280	34.26	
Independent Liberal	1	2	2	0	18,627	2.32	
Independent	1	2	1	0	15,337	1.91	
Independent Conservative	0	0	1	0	775	0.1	
Socialist	0	0	0	1	672	0.08	
Protectionist	0	0	1	0	129	0.02	
Total	65				803,386	100.0	

=== Saskatchewan ===
Results in Saskatchewan
Party	Seats	Second	Third	Votes	%	+/-
Liberals	16	3	0	125,849	51.34	
Conservative	0	13	3	67,524	27.55	
Progressive	4	4	2	40,865	16.67	
Liberal-Progressive	1	0	0	7,778	3.17	
Social Credit	0	1	0	3,094	1.26	
Total	21			245,110	100.0	

=== Yukon ===
Results in Yukon
Party	Seats	Second	Votes	%	+/-
Conservative	1	0	823	55.95	
Liberals	0	1	648	44.05	
Total	1		1,471	100.0	
