= Peterborough East =

Former federal electoral district in Ontario, Canada

Ontario electoral district

Defunct federal electoral district
- Legislature: House of Commons
- District created: 1867
- District abolished: 1924
- First contested: 1867
- Last contested: 1921

Peterborough East was a federal electoral district represented in the House of Commons of Canada from 1867 to 1925. It was located in the province of Ontario. It was created by the British North America Act 1867 which divided the County of Peterborough into two ridings.

The East Riding consisted of the Townships of Asphodel, Belmont and Methuen, Douro, Dummer, Galway, Harvey, Minden, Stanhope and Dysart, Otonabee, and Snowden, and the Village of Ashburnham, and any other surveyed Townships lying to the north.

In 1882, it was defined to consist of the townships of Asphodel, Belmont, Methuen, Douro, Dummer, Burleigh, Anstruther, Chandos, Dysart, Dudley, Harcourt, Guilford, Harburn, Bruton, Havelock, Eyre, Clyde, Nightingale, Livingstone, Lawrence, Cavendish, Glamorgan, Cardiff, Monmouth, Otonabee and Harvey, and the villages of Ashburnham, Lakefield and Norwood.

In 1903, it was redefined to consist of the townships of Anstruther, Asphodel, Belmont, Burleigh, Chandos, Douro, Dummer, Methuen and Otonabee, and the villages of Havelock, Lakefield and Norwood. In 1914, it was redefined of the townships of Anstruther, Asphodel, Belmont, Burleigh, Chandos, Douro, Dummer, Methuen and Otonabee, and the villages of Havelock, Lakefield and Norwood.

The electoral district was abolished in 1924 when it was redistributed between Hastings—Peterborough and Peterborough West ridings.

== Members of Parliament ==
This riding has elected the following members of Parliament:

Parliament	Years	Member	Party
1st	1867–1872	Peregrine Maitland Grover	Conservative
2nd	1872–1874	Peregrine Maitland Grover	Conservative
3rd	1874–1878	James Hall	Liberal
4th	1878–1882	John Burnham	Conservative
5th	1882–1887	John Burnham	Conservative
6th	1887–1891	John Lang	Independent Liberal
7th	1891–1896	John Burnham	Conservative
8th	1896–1900	John Lang	Independent Liberal
9th	1900–1904	John Lang	Independent Liberal
10th	1904–1908	John Finlay	Liberal
11th	1908–1911	John Albert Sexsmith	Conservative
12th	1911–1917	John Albert Sexsmith	Conservative
13th	1917–1921	John Albert Sexsmith	Government (Unionist)
14th	1921–1925	George Arthur Brethen	Progressive
Riding dissolved into Hastings—Peterborough and Peterborough West

== Election history ==
1867 Canadian federal election: East Riding of Peterborough
Party	Candidate	Votes
Conservative	Peregrine Maitland Grover	956
Unknown	James Anderson	644

1872 Canadian federal election: East Riding of Peterborough
Party	Candidate	Votes
Conservative	Peregrine Maitland Grover	804
Unknown	Evans Ingram	752

1874 Canadian federal election: East Riding of Peterborough
Party	Candidate	Votes
Liberal	James Hall	993
Unknown	R. D. Rogers	879

1878 Canadian federal election: East Riding of Peterborough
Party	Candidate	Votes
Conservative	John Burnham	1,262
Unknown	T. Buck	1,236

1882 Canadian federal election: East Riding of Peterborough
Party	Candidate	Votes
Conservative	John Burnham	1,449
Unknown	William E. Roxburgh	1,192

1887 Canadian federal election: East Riding of Peterborough
Party	Candidate	Votes
Independent Liberal	John Lang	1,697
Conservative	John Burnham	1,588

1891 Canadian federal election: East Riding of Peterborough
Party	Candidate	Votes
Conservative	John Burnham	1,832
Liberal	Thomas Rork	1,803

1896 Canadian federal election: East Riding of Peterborough
Party	Candidate	Votes
Independent Liberal	John Lang	2,353
Conservative	John Burnham	1,738

1900 Canadian federal election: East Riding of Peterborough
Party	Candidate	Votes
Independent Liberal	John Lang	1,876
Conservative	John A. Sexsmith	1,702

1904 Canadian federal election: East Riding of Peterborough
Party	Candidate	Votes
Liberal	John Finlay	1,588
Conservative	John Sexsmith	1,518

1908 Canadian federal election: East Riding of Peterborough
Party	Candidate	Votes
Conservative	John A. Sexsmith	1,922
Liberal	Edward A. Tanner	1,540

1911 Canadian federal election: East Riding of Peterborough
Party	Candidate	Votes
Conservative	John A. Sexsmith	1,992
Liberal	Francis D. Kerr	1,399

1917 Canadian federal election: East Riding of Peterborough
Party	Candidate	Votes
Government	John A. Sexsmith	2,555
Opposition	William H. Johnston	1,389

1921 Canadian federal election: East Riding of Peterborough
Party	Candidate	Votes
Progressive	George A. Brethen	2,647
Conservative	John A. Sexsmith	2,296
Liberal	John A. Dewart	1,503

== See also ==
- List of Canadian electoral districts
- Historical federal electoral districts of Canada
