= Gerald Cobbe =

Canadian politician

Gerald Richard Cobbe

Member of Parliament for Portage
- In office June 1968 – September 1972

Personal details
- Born: 22 March 1927 Kenton, Manitoba, Canada
- Died: 27 September 2004 (aged 77) Portage la Prairie, Manitoba, Canada
- Party: Liberal
- Profession: mechanical contractor and operator

Gerald Richard Joseph Cobbe (22 March 1927 – 27 September 2004) was a Liberal party member of the House of Commons of Canada. He was a mechanical contractor and operator by career.

He was first elected at the Portage riding in the 1968 general election. After serving his only term, the 28th Canadian Parliament, Cobbe was defeated in the 1972 election by Peter Masniuk of the Progressive Conservative party.

From October 1971 to September 1972, Cobbe was Parliamentary Secretary to Jean-Pierre Côté, the Postmaster General of that time. He died in 2004 aged 77.
