= Joan Neiman =

Canadian politician (1920–2022)

The Honourable Joan Bissett Neiman

Canadian Senator from Ontario
- In office September 1, 1972 – September 9, 1995
- Appointed by: Pierre Trudeau

Personal details
- Born: September 9, 1920 Winnipeg, Manitoba, Canada
- Died: November 27, 2022 (aged 102) Vancouver, British Columbia, Canada
- Party: Liberal
- Spouse: Clemens Michael Neiman
- Children: 3
- Parent: Edgar Douglas Richmond Bissett (father)
- Education: Mount Allison University; Osgoode Hall Law School
- Profession: Lawyer
- Committees: Chairperson, Standing Committee on Legal and Constitutional Affairs (1980–1983); Chairperson, Standing Committee on Legal and Constitutional Affairs (1983–1984 & 1986–1988); Chairperson, Special Committee on Euthanasia and Assisted Suicide (1994–1996)

Joan Bissett Neiman (September 9, 1920 – November 27, 2022) was a Canadian politician who served as a senator from 1972 to 1995.

== Background ==
Born in Winnipeg, Manitoba, the daughter of Edgar Douglas Richmond Bissett, she served in the Women's Royal Canadian Naval Service during World War II retiring as a lieutenant commander. She received a Bachelor of Arts degree from Mount Allison University and was called to the Ontario Bar. A lawyer, she was summoned to the Senate of Canada for the Ontario senatorial division of Peel on the advice of Prime Minister Pierre Trudeau in 1972. A Liberal, she served until her mandatory retirement in 1995. She was chair of the Standing Committee on Legal and Constitutional Affairs for eight years. She was chair of the Special Senate Committee on Euthanasia and Assisted Suicide. Selected as Chair of Human Rights for Interparliamentary Union being 1st Canadian to be so honoured. Served as a Team Member of The Dalhousie Health Law Institute End of Life Project.

In 2006, she was appointed by Premier Dalton McGuinty to the Citizens Panel on Increasing Organ Donations.

Neiman died on November 27, 2022, at the age of 102.

== Sources ==
- Joan Neiman – Parliament of Canada biography
- "McGuinty Government Creates Citizens Panel To Help Increase Organ Donation". Government of Ontario.
