= Anton Weselak =

Canadian politician

Member of Parliament for Springfield
- In office August 1953 – June 1957

Personal details
- Born: Anton Bernard Weselak; 11 February 1918 Beausejour, Manitoba
- Died: 17 January 1989 (aged 70)
- Party: Liberal
- Spouse: Goldie Irene Whincup (m. 1942)
- Profession: lawyer

Anton Bernard Weselak (11 February 1918 – 17 January 1989) was a Canadian lawyer and politician. Weselak was a Liberal party member of the House of Commons of Canada. He was born in Beausejour, Manitoba and became a lawyer after studies at the Manitoba Law School.

Weselak began a legal practice in Beausejour after his Call to the Bar in 1948. He was first elected to Parliament at the Springfield riding in the 1953 general election. After serving only one term, the 22nd Canadian Parliament, he was defeated by Jake Schulz of the Co-operative Commonwealth Federation in the 1957 election. Weselak made a further attempt to win back the seat in the 1958 election but lost to Val Yacula who unseated Schulz. When Yacula died shortly after that victory, Weselak was again unsuccessful in a December 1958 by-election campaign.

During the 1956 Suez Crisis, Weselak was part of Lester B. Pearson's delegation to the United Nations. Pearson was then External Affairs minister under the Louis St. Laurent government, and his efforts led to the formation of United Nations peacekeeping force which defused a full-scale Middle Eastern war.

In the years before his retirement in 1985, Weselak was a Toronto-based immigration appeal court judge. He died on 17 January 1989 and his funeral was in Trenton, Ontario.
