= James Riddell (politician) =

Canadian politician

James Riddell (May 1850 – September 19, 1926) was a Scottish-Canadian farmer and political figure in Manitoba. He represented Lorne from 1896 to 1903 in the Legislative Assembly of Manitoba as a Liberal.

He was born in Jedburgh and was educated there and at St. Andrew's University. Riddell married a Miss Sharp in Galt, Ontario. He came to Carman, Manitoba in 1880. He was president of the Dufferin Agricultural Society.

Riddell was defeated when he ran for the Dufferin seat in the Manitoba assembly in 1903. In 1904, he was an unsuccessful candidate for the Macdonald seat in the Canadian House of Commons.

Riddell later was president of the Caledonia Box and Manufacturing Company in Winnipeg. He died at home in Winnipeg at the age of 76.
