= William Gilbert Weir =

Canadian politician (1896–1971)

Member of the Canada Parliament for Macdonald
- In office 1930–1949
- Preceded by: William James Lovie

Member of the Canada Parliament for Portage—Neepawa
- In office 1949–1957
- Succeeded by: George Fairfield

Personal details
- Born: 1 July 1896 Port Perry, Ontario
- Died: 12 December 1971 (aged 75)
- Party: Liberal-Progressive
- Portfolio: Parliamentary Assistant to the Prime Minister; Chief Government Whip; Whip of the Liberal Party

William Gilbert Weir (1 July 1896 – 12 December 1971) was a Canadian politician and was the longest serving Liberal-Progressive Member of Parliament in Canadian history sitting in the House of Commons of Canada for 27 years.

Born in Port Perry, Ontario, Weir was a farmer by occupation. He was first elected to the House of Commons of Canada representing the riding of Macdonald, Manitoba defeating his sole rival by 499 votes, Conservative candidate John Woods, in the 1930 federal election. He was re-elected in 1935 against a wide field including a straight Liberal candidate, Anthony Messner, in what would be his only election facing a Liberal candidate. Subsequently, the Liberals did not oppose him.'

In 1949, Weir moved to the new riding of Portage—Neepawa and would continue to win re-election until his defeat in the 1957 general election, the first in which he shed the Liberal-Progressive label and ran as a straight Liberal.

Though retaining the Liberal-Progressive designation, Weir supported the Liberal government when it came to power in 1935 and subsequently sat with the Liberal Party caucus. He served as Chief Government Whip from 1945 to 1957 as well as parliamentary assistant to Prime Minister Louis St. Laurent from 1953 to 1957.
