= Peregrine Maitland Grover =

Canadian politician

Peregrine Maitland Grover (17 October 1818 – 28 May 1885) was an Ontario farmer, businessman and political figure. He represented Peterborough East in the House of Commons of Canada as a Conservative member from 1867 to 1874.

He was born in Grafton, Upper Canada in 1818, the son of John Grover and Mary Mirriam, both descended from United Empire Loyalists, and was educated at Upper Canada College. He moved to Peterborough, opened a general store there and, in partnership with James Foley, set up a lumber yard. In 1846, he married Harriet Maria Keeler, the daughter of Joseph Abbott Keeler, who founded Colborne, Ontario. In 1852, he moved to Norwood. Grover served as reeve of Asphodel Township and warden of Peterborough County. He was also a director of the Canada West Farmers Mutual and Stock Insurance Company. In 1863, Grover ran unsuccessfully for a seat in the Legislative Council of the Province of Canada. He died in Norwood in 1885.
