= John Lang (Canadian politician) =

Canadian politician (1839–1921)

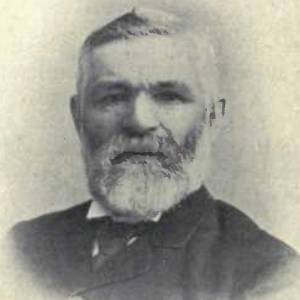
John Lang

John Lang (April 10, 1839 – November 21, 1921) was a farmer and political figure in Ontario, Canada. He represented Peterborough East in the House of Commons of Canada from 1887 to 1891 and from 1896 to 1904 as an Independent Liberal member.

He was born in Keene, Upper Canada, the son of James Lang and Agnes Stewart, both natives of Scotland. In 1866, he married Elizabeth Shearer. Lang served on the council for Otonabee Township from 1872 to 1888 and also served on the council for Peterborough County for twelve years. He also served as warden for the county and reeve for the township. Lang was first elected to the House of Commons in the 1887 federal election, defeating the incumbent John Burnham. He did not run in 1891 but defeated Burnham again in the 1896 federal election. Lang was reelected in 1900, defeating John Albert Sexsmith.
