= James Hall (Canadian politician) =

Canadian politician

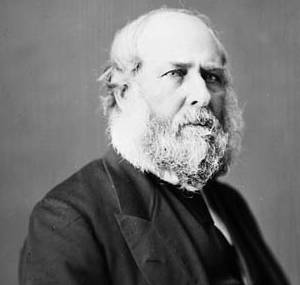
James Hall Source: Library and Archives Canada

James Hall (April 1, 1806 – October 11, 1882) was a Scottish-born land surveyor, civil engineer, merchant, and political figure in Ontario, Canada. He represented Peterborough in the Legislative Assembly of the Province of Canada from 1848 to 1851 and Peterborough East in the House of Commons of Canada from 1874 to 1878 as a Liberal member.

He was born in Clackmannanshire, the son of James Hall, and came with his family to Lanark Township, Upper Canada in 1820. Hall practised as an engineer and Provincial Land Surveyor in Lanark until about 1829 and then in Halifax, Nova Scotia from 1829 to around 1835. He then settled in Peterborough, where he established a tannery and opened a store. Hall served on the town council for Peterborough, also serving as mayor in 1852 and 1855. He was defeated when he ran for reelection to the legislative assembly for the Province of Canada in 1851. He served as sheriff for the United Counties of Peterborough and Victoria from 1859 to 1863 and for Peterborough County from 1863 to 1872. Hall was married twice: to Jane Albro in 1830 and to Jane Gifford Ferguson in 1870. He died in Peterborough at the age of 76.

His daughter Ann Jane married Sanford Fleming.
