= Alexander Thomas Embury =

Canadian politician

Member of Parliament for Hastings—Peterborough
- In office October 1925 – October 1935

Personal details
- Born: Alexander Thomas Embury; 12 January 1874 Lennox County, Ontario, Canada
- Died: 19 July 1956 (aged 82)
- Party: Conservative
- Spouse(s): Hester M. Jarman m. 22 July 1901 (d. 29 May 1929)
- Profession: physician

Alexander Thomas Embury (12 January 1874 – 19 July 1956) was a Conservative member of the House of Commons of Canada. He was born in Lennox County, Ontario and became a physician.

Embury attended school at Napanee Collegiate, then earned his medical degrees (MD, CM) at Queen's University. In 1921, he was a warden of Hastings County.

He was first elected to Parliament at the Hastings—Peterborough riding in the 1925 general election then re-elected in 1926 and 1930. Embury was defeated by Rork Scott Ferguson of the Liberals in the 1935 election.
