= Sidney Earle Smith =

Canadian academic and politician (1897–1959)

The Honourable Sidney Earle Smith PC QC
- Smith in 1945

Secretary of State for External Affairs
- In office 13 September 1957 – 17 March 1959
- Prime Minister: John Diefenbaker
- Preceded by: John Diefenbaker
- Succeeded by: John Diefenbaker (acting)

Member of Parliament for Hastings—Frontenac
- In office 4 November 1957 – 17 March 1959
- Preceded by: George Stanley White
- Succeeded by: Rod Webb

7th President of the University of Toronto
- In office 1945–1957
- Chancellor: Henry John Cody; Vincent Massey; Samuel Beatty
- Preceded by: Henry John Cody
- Succeeded by: Moffat St. Andrew Woodside (acting)

2nd President of the University of Manitoba
- In office 1934–1944
- Preceded by: James Alexander MacLean
- Succeeded by: Henry Percy Armes (Acting)

4th Dean of Dalhousie Law School
- In office 1929–1934
- Preceded by: John Erskine Read
- Succeeded by: Vincent C. MacDonald

Personal details
- Born: Sidney Earle Smith; 9 March 1897 Port Hood Island, Nova Scotia, Canada
- Died: 17 March 1959 (aged 62) Ottawa, Ontario, Canada
- Party: Progressive Conservative
- Spouse: Harriet Amelia Rand (m. 1926)
- Children: 3
- Profession: University President; Lawyer; Dean; Teacher

Sidney Earle Smith PC QC (9 March 1897 – 17 March 1959) was a Canadian academic and politician who served as Canada's Secretary of State for External Affairs in the government of Prime Minister John Diefenbaker.

== Early life and education ==
Born and raised on Nova Scotia's Port Hood Island, Smith grew up speaking both English and Gaelic. He received a B.A. and an M.A. from the University of King's College, followed by an LL.B. from Dalhousie University.

== Career ==
Smith became a lawyer and a professor of law, lecturing at Osgoode Hall Law School and then at Dalhousie University. In 1929, he became dean of Dalhousie's law school. In 1934, he left the Maritimes to become president of the University of Manitoba. In 1945, he was appointed the seventh president of the University of Toronto. He remained in that role for twelve years, overseeing a major period of the university's expansion.

== Politics ==
A strong Conservative in the Red Tory tradition, Smith became a prominent member of the Progressive Conservative Party. In 1956, he was considered a possibility for the party's leadership, but decided not to run, disappointing those in the party establishment who wished to prevent the populist John Diefenbaker from becoming leader.

After Diefenbaker won a surprise minority government in 1957, Smith was appointed as Secretary of State for External Affairs. Despite Smith's brilliance and popularity in academia, his success in this new role was limited. After holding the position for two years, he died suddenly of a stroke in 1959.

== Posthumous recognition ==
Sidney Smith Hall, the central building of the Faculty of Arts and Science at the University of Toronto, is named after him.

== Election results ==
Canadian federal by-election, November 4, 1957: Hastings—Frontenac Appointment of George Stanley White to the Senate
Party	Candidate	Votes
Progressive Conservative	Sidney Earle Smith	10,513
Labour	Ross Dowson	266
Library of Parliament
