= Hastings—Frontenac =

Federal electoral district in Ontario

Ontario electoral district

Defunct federal electoral district
- Legislature: House of Commons
- District created: 1952, 1976
- District abolished: 1966, 1981
- First contested: 1953
- Last contested: 1984

Hastings—Frontenac was a federal electoral district in Ontario, Canada, that was represented in the House of Commons of Canada from 1953 to 1968, and from 1979 to 1980.

== Constituency boundaries ==
This riding was originally created in 1952 from parts of Frontenac—Addington and Hastings—Peterborough ridings.

It consisted of:

(a) the county of Lennox and Addington (excluding the townships of Ernestown, Fredericksburg North and Fredericksburg South, Richmond, Adolphustown, and Amherst Island);

(b) the county of Frontenac (excluding the city of Kingston and the townships of Kingston, Storrington, Pittsburgh, Howe Island, Wolfe Island (including Simcoe Island, Horse Shoe Island and Mud Island)); and

(c) the part of county of Peterborough lying east of and including the townships of Anstruther, Burleigh, Dummer and Asphodel; and

(d) the part of county of Hastings lying north of and including the townships of Rawdon, Huntingdon, Madoc and Elzevir.

The electoral district was abolished in 1966 when it was redistributed between Frontenac—Lennox and Addington, Hastings, Peterborough and Victoria—Haliburton ridings.

Hastings—Frontenac was re-created in 1976 from parts of Frontenac—Lennox and Addington, Hastings, and Victoria—Haliburton ridings.

The new riding consisted of:

(a) the part of the County of Frontenac including and lying north of the Townships of Portland, Loughborough, Storrington and Pittsburg, but excluding the southwest part of the Township of Pittsburg;

(b) the part of the County of Hastings including and lying north of the Townships of Marmora, Madoc and Elzevir; and

(c) the County of Lennox and Addington, but excluding the Township of Armherst Island.

The electoral district changed name in 1981 to Hastings—Frontenac—Lennox and Addington.

== Members of Parliament ==
This riding has elected the following members of Parliament:

Parliament	Years	Member	Party
Riding created from Frontenac—Addington and Hastings—Peterborough
22nd	1953–1957	George Stanley White	Progressive Conservative
23rd	1957–1957	George Stanley White	Progressive Conservative
23rd	1957–1958	Sidney Earle Smith	Progressive Conservative
24th	1958–1959†	Sidney Earle Smith	Progressive Conservative
24th	1959–1962	Rod Webb	Progressive Conservative
25th	1962–1963	Rod Webb	Progressive Conservative
26th	1963–1965	Rod Webb	Progressive Conservative
27th	1965–1968	Rod Webb	Progressive Conservative
Riding dissolved into Frontenac—Lennox and Addington, Hastings, Peterborough and Victoria—Haliburton
Riding re-created from Frontenac—Lennox and Addington, Hastings and Victoria—Haliburton
31st	1979–1980	Bill Vankoughnet	Progressive Conservative
32nd	1980–1984	Bill Vankoughnet	Progressive Conservative
Riding renamed Hastings—Frontenac—Lennox and Addington

== Election results ==
=== Hastings—Frontenac 1953-1968 ===
1953 Canadian federal election
Party	Candidate	Votes
Progressive Conservative	George Stanley White	11,084
Liberal	Cleworth Ward Foster	7,637

1957 Canadian federal election
Party	Candidate	Votes
Progressive Conservative	George Stanley White	11,602
Liberal	John Elmer Wood	5,169
Social Credit	Cecil Alexander Jenkins	1,941

Canadian federal by-election, November 4, 1957 Appointment of George Stanley White to the Senate
Party	Candidate	Votes
Progressive Conservative	Sidney Earle Smith	10,513
Labour	Ross Dowson	266
Library of Parliament

1958 Canadian federal election
Party	Candidate	Votes
Progressive Conservative	Sidney Earle Smith	13,983
Liberal	William Arthur Shannon	5,564
Social Credit	Cecil Alexander Jenkins	606

On Mr. Smith's death, 17 March 1959:

By-election on 5 October 1959
Party	Candidate	Votes
Progressive Conservative	Rod Webb	9,079
Liberal	William Arthur Shannon	3,383

1962 Canadian federal election
Party	Candidate	Votes
Progressive Conservative	Rod Webb	12,396
Liberal	Thomas M. Neal	6,248
New Democratic	John Page	2,078

1963 Canadian federal election
Party	Candidate	Votes
Progressive Conservative	Rod Webb	12,321
Liberal	William A. Shannon	6,479
New Democratic	James Elliott	989
Social Credit	R. H. James	738

1965 Canadian federal election
Party	Candidate	Votes
Progressive Conservative	Rod Webb	11,290
Liberal	Roy Cadwell	5,034
New Democratic	Roy Frost	1,317

=== Hastings—Frontenac 1979-1980 ===
1979 Canadian federal election
Party	Candidate	Votes
Progressive Conservative	Bill Vankoughnet	17,537
Liberal	Ron Vastokas	11,176
New Democratic	Kevin Arseneault	5,691
Independent	Ross Baker	417

1980 Canadian federal election
Party	Candidate	Votes
Progressive Conservative	Bill Vankoughnet	14,211
Liberal	Ron Vastokas	13,132
New Democratic	Kevin Arseneault	5,895
Independent	Ross Baker	342

== See also ==
- List of Canadian electoral districts
- Historical federal electoral districts of Canada
