= Edward Lockyer =

Canadian politician (1899–1958)

Edward Russell Lockyer

Member of Parliament for Trinity
- In office March 1958 – October 1958
- Preceded by: Stanley Haidasz
- Succeeded by: Paul Hellyer

Personal details
- Born: 25 December 1899 Manitoulin Island, Ontario, Canada
- Died: 5 October 1958 (aged 58) Toronto, Ontario, Canada
- Party: Progressive Conservative
- Spouse: Elsie Fausett
- Profession: Fuel dealer

Edward Russell Lockyer (25 December 1899 – 5 October 1958) was a Canadian businessman and politician. Lockyer served as a Progressive Conservative party member of the House of Commons of Canada.

== Life and career ==
Lockyer was born in rural Manitoulin Island, Ontario.

In 1918, he moved to Toronto and entered the clothing business, but switched industries by 1929, creating a fuel company. He eventually became president of Northern Fuel and Automatic Heating Ltd.

He also joined the Bedford Masonic Lodge.

Lockyer was elected at the Trinity riding in the March 1958 general election and served for only several months in the 24th Canadian Parliament before he died in Toronto in October 1958, having been stricken with heart disease while viewing a telecast of the fourth game of the 1958 World Series.
