= Joseph Slogan =

Canadian politician (1931–2024)

Member of Parliament for Springfield
- In office December 1958 – November 1965
- Preceded by: Val Yacula
- Succeeded by: riding abolished

Personal details
- Born: February 15, 1931 Windsor, Ontario, Canada
- Died: November 3, 2024 (aged 93) Selkirk, Manitoba, Canada
- Party: Progressive Conservative
- Profession: Dentist

Joseph Slogan (February 15, 1931 – November 3, 2024) was a Canadian politician who was a Progressive Conservative Party member of the House of Commons of Canada. He was a dentist by career.

Born in Windsor, Ontario, he was first elected at Manitoba's Springfield riding in the 1958 general election after an unsuccessful attempt to win the riding in 1953. Slogan was re-elected there in 1962 and 1963, then defeated in the 1965 election by Edward Schreyer of the New Democratic Party.

Slogan was a member of the Ukrainian community. Slogan died in Selkirk, Manitoba on November 3, 2024, at the age of 93.
