= Macdonald (electoral district) =

Former federal electoral district in Manitoba, Canada

Macdonald was a federal electoral district in Manitoba, Canada, that was represented in the House of Commons of Canada from 1892 to 1949. This riding was created in 1892 from parts of Marquette ridings. It was abolished in 1947 when it was redistributed into Brandon, Lisgar, Portage—Neepawa, Selkirk and Souris ridings.

It consisted of the rural municipalities of South Cypress, South Norfolk, North Norfolk, North Cypress, Langford, Rosedale, Lansdowne, Westbourne and Portage la Prairie, and the towns of Portage la Prairie, Gladstone and Neepawa, and the village of Carberry, together with some unorganised territory lying west of Lake Manitoba and north to the northern boundary of the province of Manitoba.

== Election results ==
1896 Canadian federal election
Party	Candidate	Votes
Conservative	BOYD, Nathaniel	2,436
Liberal	RUTHERFORD, John G.	2,038
Patrons of Industry	BAITHWAITE, Charles	1,259

By-election: On election being declared void, 30 March 1897

By-election on 27 April 1897
Party	Candidate	Votes
Liberal	RUTHERFORD, J.G.	2,619
Conservative	MCKENZIE, Kenneth	2,083

1900 Canadian federal election
Party	Candidate	Votes
Conservative	BOYD, Nathaniel	3,866
Liberal	RUTHERFORD, John G.	3,710

1904 Canadian federal election
Party	Candidate	Votes
Conservative	STAPLES, William D.	2,737
Liberal	RIDDELL, Jas.	2,147

1908 Canadian federal election
Party	Candidate	Votes
Conservative	STAPLES, William D.	2,990
Liberal	THOMPSON, Samuel Jacob	2,414

1911 Canadian federal election
Party	Candidate	Votes
Conservative	STAPLES, William D.	2,956
Liberal	WOODS, James Smith	2,795

By-election: On Mr. Staples being appointed Grain Commissioner for Canada, 10 April 1912

By-election on 12 October 1912
Party	Candidate	Votes
Conservative	MORRISON, Alexander	3,534
Liberal	RICHARDSON, R.L.	2,740

By-election: On election being declared void, 10 November 1913

By-election on 13 December 1913
Party	Candidate	Votes
Conservative	MORRISON, Alex.	3,855
Liberal	MYLES, Andrew Watson	2,939

1917 Canadian federal election
Party	Candidate	Votes
Government (Unionist)	HENDERS, Richard Coe	5,327
Opposition (Laurier Liberals)	WALSH, William Henry	1,561

1921 Canadian federal election
Party	Candidate	Votes
Progressive	LOVIE, William James	5,989
Conservative	ARGUE, Andrew Starrat	2,036
Liberal	ROCAN, Joseph	1,035

1925 Canadian federal election
Party	Candidate	Votes
Progressive	LOVIE, William James	5,346
Conservative	ROBINSON, Herbert Edward	3,293

1926 Canadian federal election
Party	Candidate	Votes
Progressive	LOVIE, William James	6,652
Conservative	SCHWEITZER, Valmore Eric	4,306

1930 Canadian federal election
Party	Candidate	Votes
Liberal–Progressive	WEIR, William Gilbert	6,100
Conservative	WOODS, John Ernest	5,601

1935 Canadian federal election
Party	Candidate	Votes
Liberal–Progressive	WEIR, William Gilbert	5,987
Conservative	SPINKS, William Hooey	4,072
Liberal	MESSNER, Anthony MacDonald	1,865
Reconstruction	BENNETT, Leslie James	1,291
Co-operative Commonwealth	MACLEAN, John	967

1940 Canadian federal election
Party	Candidate	Votes
Liberal–Progressive	WEIR, William Gilbert	7,728
National Government	CUDDY, James Anthony	4,510
Co-operative Commonwealth	LANGTRY, Ivan Andrew	2,639

1945 Canadian federal election
Party	Candidate	Votes
Liberal–Progressive	WEIR, William Gilbert	6,147
Progressive Conservative	CUDDY, James Anthony	5,147
Co-operative Commonwealth	KENDALL, Harold	2,078
Social Credit	TINKLER, Wilbert James	1,235

== See also ==
- List of Canadian electoral districts
- Historical federal electoral districts of Canada
