= Jacob Schulz =

Canadian politician and farmer (1901–1983)

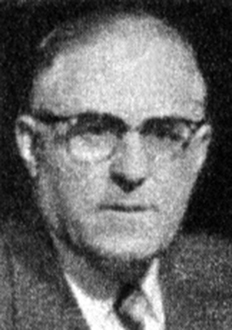

Jacob (Jake) Shulz (October 12, 1901 – August 14, 1983) was a Canadian farmer and politician as well as the father-in-law of Governor General Ed Schreyer.

Shulz was born in Friedensthal, a Bessarabia German community in the Russian Empire, from 1918 part of Romania and today Mirnopolye, Ukraine. He came to Canada with his wife in 1930 to become a farmer in the Gilbert Plains area of Manitoba. He joined the co-operative movement and became involved in municipal politics.

He was a candidate for the Manitoba Co-operative Commonwealth Federation in the 1949 provincial election in the electoral district of Gilbert Plains, losing by 330 votes to Ray Mitchell.

In 1950, Schulz became founding president of the Manitoba Farmers Union and served as chairman of the Interprovincial Farm Union Council in the mid-1950s. He was elected to Parliament in the 1957 general election representing the Springfield district for the Co-operative Commonwealth Federation. He served for the short 23rd Canadian Parliament, which lasted less than a year, before losing his seat in the 1958 federal election that elected a landslide majority government for the Progressive Conservative Party of Canada.

Shulz founded a construction company in 1960 and wrote a book, The Rise and Fall of Farm Organizations.

His son, Herbert, was also a farmer and co-operative farm activist. His daughter, Lily, is married to Ed Schreyer, who, in the 1965 federal election, was elected a New Democratic Party MP from Schulz' old riding of Springfield.
