= Portage (electoral district) =

Former federal electoral district in Manitoba, Canada

Portage was a federal electoral district in Manitoba, Canada, that was represented in the House of Commons of Canada from 1968 to 1979.

This riding was created in 1966 from parts of Lisgar, Portage—Neepawa, Selkirk, Springfield, and St. Boniface ridings. It was abolished in 1976 when it was redistributed into Lisgar, Portage—Marquette, Winnipeg North, Selkirk—Interlake, Winnipeg North Centre and Winnipeg—Assiniboine ridings.

== Election results ==
1968 Canadian federal election
Party	Candidate	Votes
Liberal	COBBE, Gerald Richard	8,415
Progressive Conservative	ENNS, Sig J.	8,025
New Democratic	ROSCHUK, Kazmir	3,184

1972 Canadian federal election
Party	Candidate	Votes
Progressive Conservative	MASNIUK, Peter P.	9,781
Liberal	COBBE, Gerry	7,474
New Democratic	MANCHUR, Nick	4,036
Not affiliated	FITCH, Travis I.	199

1974 Canadian federal election
Party	Candidate	Votes
Progressive Conservative	MASNIUK, Peter	11,829
Liberal	OMINCHINSKI, J.G.	6,671
New Democratic	RENOOY, Rens	2,857
Social Credit	BEZAN, Ted	179
Not affiliated	FITCH, Travis	97

== See also ==
- List of Canadian electoral districts
- Historical federal electoral districts of Canada
