= Thomas Hay (Canadian politician) =

Canadian politician

Thomas Hay (August 6, 1872 – October 2, 1939) was a farmer and political figure in Manitoba, Canada. He represented Selkirk from 1917 to 1921 and Springfield from 1925 to 1926 and from 1930 to 1935 in the House of Commons of Canada as a Conservative.

He was born in St. Andrews, Manitoba, the son of Robert Hay and Christina McDonald, and was educated there. Hay settled on a farm in Lockport. He served on the municipal council for St. Clements and was reeve of Home from 1912 to 1914. Hay was defeated when he ran for reelection in 1921 and 1926. He died in Gonor, Manitoba at the age of 67.
