= Hastings—Peterborough =

Former federal electoral district in Ontario, Canada

Ontario electoral district

Defunct federal electoral district
- Legislature: House of Commons
- District created: 1924
- District abolished: 1952
- First contested: 1925
- Last contested: 1949

Hastings—Peterborough was a federal electoral district represented in the House of Commons of Canada from 1925 to 1953. It was located in the province of Ontario. This riding was created in 1924 from parts of Hastings East and Peterborough East ridings.

It was initially defined as consisting of the part of the county of Peterborough lying east of and including the townships of Anstruther, Burleigh, Dummer and Asphodel; and the part of the county of Hastings lying north of and including the townships of Rawdon, Huntingdon, Madoc and Elzevir.

In 1933, it was redefined to consist of the part of the county of Peterborough lying east of and including the townships of Anstruther, Burleigh, Dummer and Asphodel; and that part of the county, together with that part of the county of Hastings lying north of a line described as commencing at the southwest corner of the township of Rawdon and following the south boundary of the said township, the south and east boundaries of the township of Huntingdon and the south boundary of the townships of Madoc and Elzevir to the east boundary of the said county.

The electoral district was abolished in 1952 when it was redistributed between Hastings—Frontenac and Peterborough ridings.

== Members of Parliament ==
This riding elected the following members of the House of Commons of Canada:

Parliament	Years	Member	Party
Riding created from Hastings East and Peterborough East
15th	1925–1926	Alexander Thomas Embury	Conservative
16th	1926–1930	Alexander Thomas Embury	Conservative
17th	1930–1935	Alexander Thomas Embury	Conservative
18th	1935–1940	Rork Scott Ferguson	Liberal
19th	1940–1945	George Stanley White	National Government
20th	1945–1949	George Stanley White	Progressive Conservative
21st	1949–1953	George Stanley White	Progressive Conservative
Riding dissolved into Hastings—Frontenac and Peterborough

== Election results ==
1925 Canadian federal election
Party	Candidate	Votes
Conservative	Alexander Thomas Embury	6,511
Progressive	George Arthur Brethen	3,747

1926 Canadian federal election
Party	Candidate	Votes
Conservative	Alexander Thomas Embury	6,797
Liberal	John Smith Marshall	2,680

1930 Canadian federal election
Party	Candidate	Votes
Conservative	Alexander Thomas Embury	6,993
Liberal	Fraser Aylsworth	2,999

1935 Canadian federal election
Party	Candidate	Votes
Liberal	Rork Scott Ferguson	5,671
Conservative	Alexander Thomas Embury	4,619
Reconstruction	Judson Armstrong Gunter	2,552

1940 Canadian federal election
Party	Candidate	Votes
National Government	George Stanley White	5,471
Liberal	Rork Scott Ferguson	5,207

1945 Canadian federal election
Party	Candidate	Votes
Progressive Conservative	George Stanley White	6,876
Liberal	Rork Scott Ferguson	4,226
Co-operative Commonwealth	Ralph Francis Turner	673

1949 Canadian federal election
Party	Candidate	Votes
Progressive Conservative	George Stanley White	6,578
Liberal	John Wellington Munro	4,681
Co-operative Commonwealth	John Thomas Basil Haffey	732

== See also ==
- List of Canadian electoral districts
- Historical federal electoral districts of Canada
