= Val Yacula =

Canadian politician

MP for Springfield
- In office May 12, 1958 – September 24, 1958
- Preceded by: Jake Schulz
- Succeeded by: Joe Slogan

Personal details
- Born: 1908 Ukraine
- Died: September 24, 1958 (aged 49–50)
- Party: Progressive Conservative
- Occupation: teacher

William (Val) Yacula (1908 – September 24, 1958) was a Canadian politician. He represented the electoral district of Springfield in the House of Commons of Canada as a member of the Progressive Conservatives.

He was elected in the 1958 election. However, he died on September 24, 1958, after just 178 days in office.
