= George Stanley White =

Canadian politician

George Stanley White, PC (17 November 1897 – 6 January 1977) was a Canadian parliamentarian and Speaker of the Senate of Canada from 1962 to 1963.

White was born in Madoc, Ontario. He received a law degree from Osgoode Hall Law School in Toronto and returned to Madoc to begin his legal practice after serving in World War I with the 44th Battalion of the Canadian Expeditionary Force.

White was first elected to the House of Commons of Canada in 1940. He was elected as a "National Government" candidate as that was the banner the Conservatives used for that election. The Tories subsequently changed their name to "Progressive Conservative" and he was re-elected under that banner for the riding of Hastings—Peterborough (known as Hastings—Frontenac from 1953).

As an Opposition MP, White promoted the cause of war veterans and helped write the legislation known as the "Veteran's Charter".

The 1957 election resulted in the first Progressive Conservative government in over two decades. In September of that year new Progressive Conservative Prime Minister John Diefenbaker made White his first appointment to the Senate so that Sidney Earle Smith, the newly appointed Secretary of State for External Affairs despite not being an MP could attempt to win a seat in the House of Commons through a by-election.

White served as the government's whip in the Senate from 1958 until September 1962 when he was appointed Speaker. He served in the chair for a few months until the defeat of the Diefenbaker government in the 1963 federal election. He voluntarily retired from the Senate on 17 November 1972, when he turned 75.
