= Springfield (federal electoral district) =

Former federal electoral district in Manitoba, Canada

Springfield was a federal electoral district in Manitoba, Canada, that was represented in the House of Commons of Canada from 1917 to 1968.

This riding was created in 1914 from parts of the Selkirk and Provencher ridings. It was abolished in 1966 when it was redistributed into Churchill, Portage, Provencher, Selkirk and Winnipeg North ridings.

Springfield was a swing riding, often returning members of the Liberal, Progressive Conservative, and New Democratic parties and their historical equivalents. The riding was most recently held by NDP MP Ed Schreyer, before it was dissolved into surrounding ridings.

== Election results ==
=== 1965 ===
1965 Canadian federal election
Party	Candidate	Votes	
New Democratic	SCHREYER, Ed	8,001	
Progressive Conservative	SLOGAN, Joe	7,246	
Liberal	BILYNSKY, Wm.	4,104	
Social Credit	LUINING, Robert H.	1,085	
NDP gain from PC		Swing	-

=== 1963 ===
1963 Canadian federal election
Party	Candidate	Votes	
Progressive Conservative	SLOGAN, Joe	9,552	
Liberal	WARREN, Archie	5,532	
New Democratic	SYMS, Frank	3,648	
Social Credit	LUINING, Robert H.	1,358	
PC hold		Swing	-

=== 1962 ===
1962 Canadian federal election
Party	Candidate	Votes	
Progressive Conservative	SLOGAN, Joe	8,052	
Liberal	WARREN, Archie	5,248	
New Democratic	SCHULZ, Jake	4,960	
Social Credit	REMPEL, Bernie	1,669	
PC hold		Swing	-

=== 1958 by-election ===
This by-election was held due to the death of the incumbent MP Val Yacula, on 24 September 1958. The riding was held for the Progressive Conservatives by Joseph Slogan.

By-election on 15 December 1958
Party	Candidate	Votes
Progressive Conservative	SLOGAN, Joe	4,248
Liberal	WESELAK, Anton Bernard	3,757
Co-operative Commonwealth	SCHULZ, Jake	3,446
PC hold		Swing	-

=== 1958 ===
1958 Canadian federal election
Party	Candidate	Votes	
Progressive Conservative	YACULA, Val	7,045	
Co-operative Commonwealth	SCHULZ, Jake	4,962	
Liberal	WESELAK, Anton Bernard	3,491	
Social Credit	GROSS, John William	1,125	
PC gain from CCF		Swing	-

=== 1957 ===
1957 Canadian federal election
Party	Candidate	Votes	
Co-operative Commonwealth	SCHULZ, Jake	5,949	
Liberal	WESELAK, Anton Bernard	4,453	
Social Credit	SCHLAMP, Lawrence Paul	3,558	
Progressive Conservative	YACULA, Val	1,684	
CCF gain		Swing	Liberal-

=== 1953 ===
1953 Canadian federal election
Party	Candidate	Votes	
Liberal	WESELAK, Anton Bernard	6,240	
Co-operative Commonwealth	DEGRAFF, Frank Jacob	1,878	
Social Credit	TRAPP, Paul Gottfried	1,221	
Progressive Conservative	SLOGAN, Joseph	1,201	
Independent Liberal	SINNOTT, John Sylvester	1,068	
Labor–Progressive	BILESKI, Andrew	469	
Independent	BIBEROVICH, Ladislaus	293	
Liberal hold		Swing	-

=== 1949 ===
1949 Canadian federal election
Party	Candidate	Votes	
Liberal	SINNOTT, John Sylvester	8,253	
Co-operative Commonwealth	WASYLYK, Harry	4,418	
Progressive Conservative	BODIE, J. Leslie	3,494	
Labor–Progressive	BILESKI, Andrew	1,117	
Liberal hold		Swing	-

=== 1945 ===
1945 Canadian federal election
Party	Candidate	Votes	
Liberal	SINNOTT, John Sylvester	5,376	
Co-operative Commonwealth	DONELEYKO, Wilbert	4,797	
Labor–Progressive	BILESKI, Andrew	2,400	
Progressive Conservative	BETHEL, Clarence Henry	2,308	
Social Credit	MCLEOD, Alexander James Harper	1,783	
Independent	ABBOTT, Charles Leo	231	
Liberal hold		Swing	-

=== 1940 ===
1940 Canadian federal election
Party	Candidate	Votes
Liberal	TURNER, John Mouat	7,462
Co-operative Commonwealth	KNOWLES, Stanley Howard	7,018
National Government	FINLAYSON, Roderick Kenneth	3,311

=== 1935 ===
1935 Canadian federal election
Party	Candidate	Votes	
Liberal	TURNER, John Mouat	3,564	
Co-operative Commonwealth	SULKERS, Herbert	3,117	
Liberal–Progressive	STRYK, Nicholas John	2,998	
Conservative	TAYLOR, Louis Lawrence	2,351	
Reconstruction	DOYLE, Arthur M.	1,667	
Independent Liberal	MCMURRAY, Joseph Henry	478	
Independent	ZAHARYCHUK, Andrew	280	
Liberal gain from Conservative (historical)		Swing	-

=== 1930 ===
1930 Canadian federal election
Party	Candidate	Votes	
Conservative	HAY, Thomas	5,446	
Liberal–Progressive	BISSETT, Edgar Douglas Richmond	3,617	
Labour	LANGE, Frederick William	1,106	
Independent Liberal	ROSS, Donald Andrew	511	
Independent Liberal	GRABOWSKI, Stanley	307	
Conservative (historical) gain from Liberal–Progressive		Swing	-

=== 1926 ===
1926 Canadian federal election
Party	Candidate	Votes	
Liberal–Progressive	BISSETT, Edgar Douglas Richmond	3,852	
Conservative	HAY, Thomas	2,638	
Labour	DUNN, Thomas Herbert	1,375	
Liberal–Progressive gain from Conservative (historical)		Swing	-

=== 1926 ===
1925 Canadian federal election
Party	Candidate	Votes	
Conservative	HAY, Thomas	2,259	
Liberal	BISSETT, Edgar Douglas Richmond	1,724	
Progressive	HOLLAND, John	1,665	
Conservative (historical) gain from Progressive		Swing	-

=== 1921 ===
1921 Canadian federal election
Party	Candidate	Votes	
Progressive	HOEY, Robert Alexander	5,779	
Liberal	MOLLOY, Thomas Boniface	4,382	
Conservative	SUTHERLAND, Alexander Douglas	2,234	
Progressive gain from Unionist		Swing	-

=== 1917 ===
1917 Canadian federal election
Party	Candidate	Votes
Government (Unionist)	RICHARDSON, Robert Lorne	5,870
Opposition (Laurier Liberals)	CHARETTE, Guillaume Joseph	3,781
Unionist pickup new district.		

== See also ==
- List of Canadian electoral districts
- Historical federal electoral districts of Canada
