= John Albert Sexsmith =

Canadian politician

John Albert Sexsmith (April 22, 1866 – February 6, 1943) was a farmer and political figure in Ontario, Canada. He represented Peterborough East in the House of Commons of Canada from 1908 to 1917 as a Conservative and from 1917 to 1921 as a Unionist Party member.

He was born in Belmont Township, Canada West, the son of Thomas Sexsmith, and was educated there. Sexsmith married Bessie M. Buchanan in 1909. He was a farmer in Havelock. He served on the township council for Belmont from 1893 to 1897 and was reeve from 1899 to 1905. Sexsmith ran unsuccessfully for a seat in the House of Commons in 1900 and 1904. He was defeated when he ran for reelection in 1921. He died in Belmont at the age of 76.
