= Portage—Neepawa =

Former federal electoral district in Manitoba, Canada

Portage—Neepawa was a federal electoral district in Manitoba, Canada, that was represented in the House of Commons of Canada from 1949 to 1968.

This riding was created in 1947 from parts of Macdonald, Neepawa and Portage la Prairie ridings. It was abolished in 1966 when it was redistributed into Dauphin, Lisgar, Marquette, Portage, and Winnipeg South Centre ridings.

== Election results ==
1949 Canadian federal election
Party	Candidate	Votes
Liberal–Progressive	WEIR, William Gilbert	9,192
Progressive Conservative	NELSON, Harold Alexander	6,819
Co-operative Commonwealth	MATTHEWS, Albert Clifford	2,269

1953 Canadian federal election
Party	Candidate	Votes
Liberal–Progressive	WEIR, William Gilbert	8,958
Progressive Conservative	COWAN, Jim	5,604
Social Credit	COLLVER, Hugh Roy	3,223

1957 Canadian federal election
Party	Candidate	Votes
Progressive Conservative	FAIRFIELD, George Clark	9,248
Liberal	WEIR, William Gilbert	6,407
Social Credit	MCKINNON, Charles John	4,247
Co-operative Commonwealth	SMEE, Edgar Edward	1,630

1958 Canadian federal election
Party	Candidate	Votes
Progressive Conservative	FAIRFIELD, George C.	15,304
Liberal	HENDERSON, Harold Lloyd	6,434
Co-operative Commonwealth	COULTHARD, Sidney	1,598

1962 Canadian federal election
Party	Candidate	Votes
Progressive Conservative	ENNS, Siegfried J.	11,125
Liberal	SHUTTLEWORTH, C. Lemington	7,615
New Democratic	DUNCAN, Douglas Alfred	2,285
Social Credit	HUGHES, Richard D.	1,425
Independent	HENDERSON, Harold Lloyd	1,144

1963 Canadian federal election
Party	Candidate	Votes
Progressive Conservative	ENNS, Sig J.	12,532
Liberal	BRADLEY, William H.	8,398
New Democratic	BARNETT, Sybil	1,551
Social Credit	TURNER, Charles R.	1,484
Independent	HENDERSON, Harold Lloyd	826

1965 Canadian federal election
Party	Candidate	Votes
Progressive Conservative	ENNS, Sig J.	13,043
Liberal	HYDE, W. Fred L.	8,260
New Democratic	NORMAN, Charles	2,896
Social Credit	TURNER, Charles R.	1,060

== See also ==
- List of Canadian electoral districts
- Historical federal electoral districts of Canada
