= Rod Webb =

Canadian politician

Roderick Arthur Ennis Webb
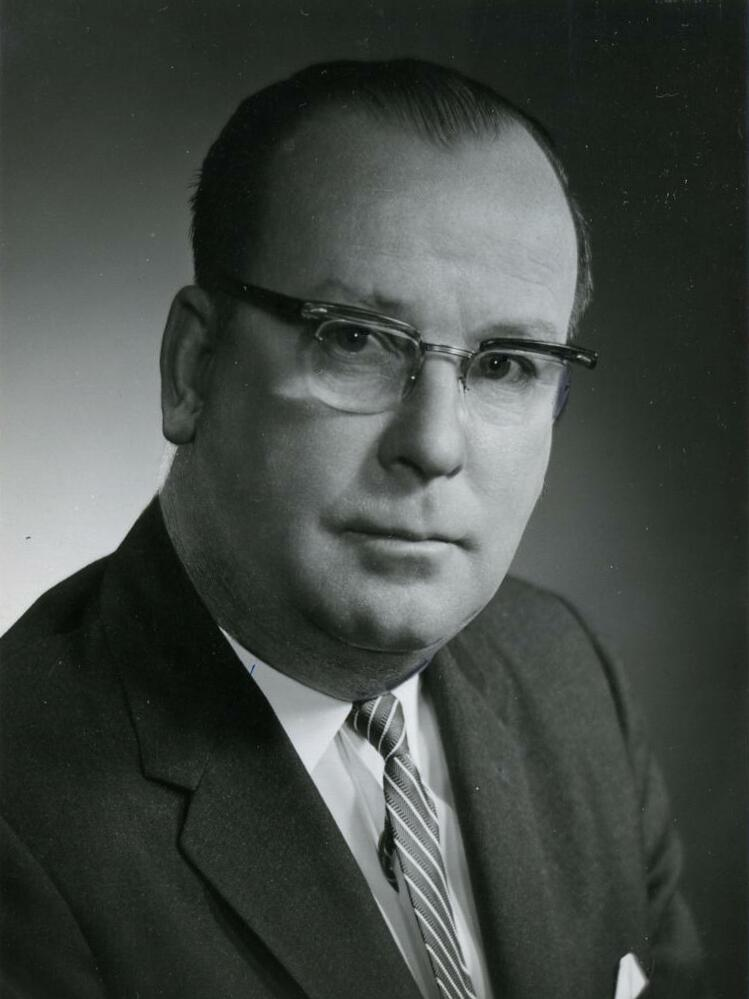

Member of Parliament for Hastings—Frontenac
- In office October 1959 – April 1968

Personal details
- Born: 22 July 1910 Toronto, Ontario
- Died: 1 October 1999 (aged 89)
- Party: Progressive Conservative
- Profession: electrician, merchant

Roderick Arthur Ennis Webb (22 July 1910 – 1 October 1999) was a Progressive Conservative party member of the House of Commons of Canada. He was born in Toronto, Ontario and became an electrician and merchant by career.

He was first elected at the Hastings—Frontenac riding in a 5 October 1959 by-election then re-elected there in the 1962, 1963 and 1965 federal elections. After completing his final House of Commons term in 1968, the 27th Canadian Parliament, Rod Webb did not seek further re-election.
