= 9th Canadian Parliament =

1901–04 national legislative term

- Majority parliament
- Feb. 6, 1901 – Sep. 29, 1904

Parliament leaders
- Prime minister: Sir Wilfrid Laurier; Jul. 11, 1896 – Oct. 6, 1911
- Cabinet: 8th Canadian Ministry
- Leader of the Opposition: Sir Robert Borden; Feb. 6, 1901 – Oct. 9, 1911

Party caucuses
- Government: Liberal Party
- Opposition: Conservative Party & Liberal-Conservative

House of Commons
- Seating arrangements of the House of Commons
- Speaker of the Commons: Louis-Philippe Brodeur; Feb. 6, 1901 – Jan. 18, 1904
- Napoléon Belcourt; Mar. 10, 1904 – Jan. 10, 1905

Senate
- Speaker of the Senate: Lawrence Geoffrey Power; Jan. 29, 1901 – Jan. 8, 1905

Sovereign
- Monarch: Edward VII; Jan. 22, 1901 – May. 6, 1910
- Governor general: The Earl of Minto; Nov. 12, 1898 – Dec. 10, 1904

Sessions
- 1st session February 6, 1901 – May 23, 1901
- 2nd session February 13, 1902 – May 15, 1902
- 3rd session March 12, 1903 – October 24, 1903
- 4th session March 10, 1904 – August 10, 1904
← 8th	→ 10th

The 9th Canadian Parliament was in session from February 6, 1901, until September 29, 1904 (3 years and 235 days). The membership was set by the 1900 federal election on November 7, 1900. It was dissolved prior to the 1904 election.

It was controlled by a Liberal Party majority under Prime Minister Sir Wilfrid Laurier and the 8th Canadian Ministry. The Official Opposition was the Conservative/Liberal-Conservative, led by Robert Borden.

The Speaker was first Louis Philippe Brodeur, and later Napoléon Antoine Belcourt. See also List of Canadian electoral districts 1892-1903 for a list of the ridings in this parliament.

There were four sessions of the 9th Parliament.

== List of members ==
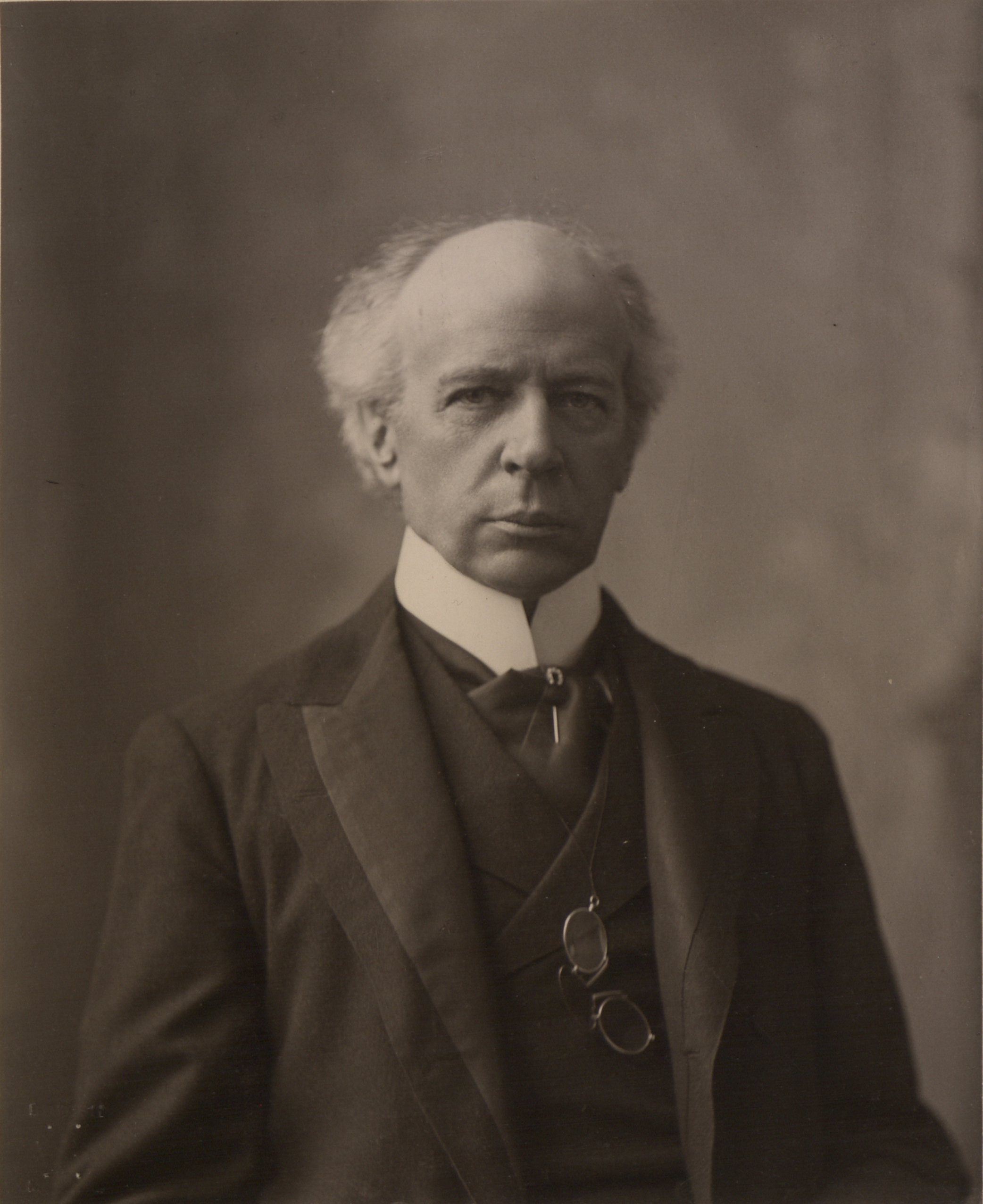
Sir Wilfrid Laurier was Prime Minister during the 9th Canadian Parliament.

Following is a full list of members of the ninth Parliament listed first by province, then by electoral district.

Key:

- Party leaders are italicized.
- Cabinet ministers are in **boldface**.
- The Prime Minister is **both**.
- The Speaker is indicated by "(†)".

Electoral districts denoted by an asterisk (*) indicates that district was represented by two members.

=== British Columbia ===
Electoral district	Name	Party	First elected/previously elected	No. of terms
Burrard	George Ritchie Maxwell (died 17 November 1902)	Liberal	1896	2nd term
Burrard	Robert George Macpherson (by-election of 1903-02-04)	Liberal	1903	1st term
New Westminster	Aulay MacAulay Morrison	Liberal	1896	2nd term
Vancouver	Ralph Smith	Liberal	1900	1st term
Victoria*	Thomas Earle	Conservative	1889	4th term
Victoria*	Edward Gawler Prior (until voided 2 December 1901)	Conservative	1888	4th term
Victoria*	George Riley (by-election of 1902-01-28)	Liberal	1902	1st term
Yale—Cariboo	William Alfred Galliher	Liberal	1900	1st term

=== Manitoba ===
Electoral district	Name	Party	First elected/previously elected	No. of terms
Brandon	**Clifford Sifton**	Liberal	1896	2nd term
Lisgar	Robert Lorne Richardson (until election voided 20 July 1901)	Independent	1896	2nd term
Lisgar	Duncan Alexander Stewart (by-election of 1902-02-18)	Liberal	1902	1st term
Macdonald	Nathaniel Boyd	Conservative	1892	3rd term
Marquette	William James Roche	Conservative	1896	2nd term
Provencher	Alphonse Alfred Clément Larivière	Conservative	1889	4th term
Selkirk	William McCreary	Liberal	1900	1st term
Winnipeg	Arthur Puttee	Independent Labour	1900	2nd term

=== New Brunswick ===
Electoral district	Name	Party	First elected/previously elected	No. of terms
Albert	William James Lewis	Liberal	1896	2nd term
Carleton	Frederick Harding Hale	Liberal-Conservative	1887, 1896	3rd term*
Charlotte	Gilbert White Ganong	Liberal-Conservative	1896	2nd term
City and County of St. John	Joseph John Tucker	Liberal	1896	2nd term
City of St. John	**Andrew George Blair** (resigned 27 December 1903)	Liberal	1896	2nd term
City of St. John	John Waterhouse Daniel (by-election of 1904-02-16)	Conservative	1904	1st term
Gloucester	Onésiphore Turgeon	Liberal	1900	1st term
Kent	Olivier J. Leblanc	Liberal	1900	1st term
King's	George William Fowler	Conservative	1900	1st term
Northumberland	James Robinson	Conservative	1896	2nd term
Restigouche	James Reid	Liberal	1900	1st term
Sunbury—Queen's	Robert Duncan Wilmot	Conservative	1887, 1900	3rd term*
Victoria	John Costigan	Liberal-Conservative	1867	9th term
Westmorland	**Henry Emmerson** (until ministerial appointment)	Liberal	1900	1st term
Westmorland	**Henry Emmerson** (by-election of 1904-01-30)	Liberal	1900	1st term
York	Alexander Gibson (until election voided 11 June 1901)	Liberal	1900	1st term
York	Alexander Gibson (by-election of 1901-12-28)	Liberal	1900	1st term

=== Northwest Territories ===
Electoral district	Name	Party	First elected/previously elected	No. of terms
Alberta (Provisional District)	Frank Oliver	Liberal	1896	2nd term
Assiniboia East	James Moffat Douglas	Liberal	1896	2nd term
Assiniboia West	Thomas Walter Scott	Liberal	1900	1st term
Saskatchewan (Provisional District)	Thomas Osborne Davis	Liberal	1896	2nd term

=== Nova Scotia ===
Electoral district	Name	Party	First elected/previously elected	No. of terms
Annapolis	Fletcher Bath Wade	Liberal	1900	1st term
Antigonish	Colin Francis McIsaac	Liberal	1895	3rd term
Cape Breton*	Alexander Johnston	Liberal	1900	1st term
Cape Breton*	Arthur Samuel Kendall	Liberal	1900	1st term
Colchester	Seymour Eugene Gourley	Conservative	1900	1st term
Cumberland	Hance James Logan	Liberal	1896	2nd term
Digby	Albert James Smith Copp	Liberal	1896	2nd term
Guysborough	Duncan Cameron Fraser (until 10 February 1904 judicial appointment)	Liberal	1891	3rd term
Guysborough	John Howard Sinclair (by-election of 1904-03-16)	Liberal	1904	1st term
Halifax*	Robert Laird Borden	Conservative	1896	2nd term
Halifax*	William Roche	Liberal	1900	1st term
Hants	Benjamin Russell	Liberal	1896	2nd term
Inverness	Angus MacLennan	Liberal	1896	2nd term
Kings	**Frederick William Borden**	Liberal	1874, 1887	6th term*
Lunenburg	Charles Edwin Kaulbach	Conservative	1882, 1883, 1891	5th term*
Pictou*	Adam Carr Bell	Conservative	1896	2nd term
Pictou*	Charles Hibbert Tupper	Conservative	1882	5th term
Richmond	Joseph Matheson	Liberal	1900	1st term
Shelburne and Queen's	**William Stevens Fielding**	Liberal	1896	2nd term
Victoria	William Ross	Liberal	1867, 1900	5th term*
Yarmouth	Thomas Barnard Flint (until 11 November 1902 House of Commons Clerk appointment)	Liberal	1891	3rd term
Yarmouth	Bowman Brown Law (by-election of 1902-12-03)	Liberal	1902	1st term

=== Ontario ===
Electoral district	Name	Party	First elected/previously elected	No. of terms
Addington	John William Bell (died 5 July 1901)	Conservative	1882, 1896	4th term*
Addington	Melzar Avery (by-election of 1902-01-15)	Conservative	1902	1st term
Algoma	Albert Dyment	Liberal	1896	2nd term
Bothwell	James Clancy	Conservative	1896	2nd term
Brant South	Charles Bernhard Heyd	Liberal	1897	2nd term
Brockville	John Culbert	Conservative	1900	1st term
Bruce East	Henry Cargill (died 1 October 1903)	Conservative	1892	3rd term
Bruce East	James J. Donnelly (by-election of 1904-02-16)	Conservative	1904	1st term
Bruce North	Alexander McNeill (until election voided 2 December 1901)	Liberal-Conservative	1882	5th term
Bruce North	James Halliday (by-election of 1901-03-20)	Conservative	1901	1st term
Bruce West	John Tolmie	Liberal	1896	2nd term
Cardwell	Robert Johnston	Conservative	1900	1st term
Carleton	Edward Kidd	Conservative	1900	1st term
Cornwall and Stormont	Robert Abercrombie Pringle	Conservative	1900	1st term
Dundas	Andrew Broder	Conservative	1896	2nd term
Durham East	Henry Alfred Ward	Conservative	1885, 1900	3rd term*
Durham West	Charles Jonas Thornton (until election voided 6 October 1901)	Conservative	1900	1st term
Durham West	Robert Beith (by-election of 1902-01-15)	Liberal	1891, 1902	3rd term*
Elgin East	Andrew B. Ingram	Liberal-Conservative	1891	3rd term
Elgin West	Jabel Robinson	Independent	1900	1st term
Essex North	Robert Franklin Sutherland	Liberal	1900	1st term
Essex South	Mahlon K. Cowan	Liberal	1896	2nd term
Frontenac	Hiram Augustus Calvin	Conservative	1900	1st term
Glengarry	Jacob Thomas Schell	Liberal	1900	1st term
Grenville South	John Dowsley Reid	Conservative	1896	2nd term
Grey East	Thomas Simpson Sproule	Conservative	1878	6th term
Grey North	Edward Henry Horsey (died 23 July 1902)	Liberal	1900	1st term
Grey North	Thomas Inkerman Thomson (by-election of 1903-02-24)	Conservative	1903	1st term
Grey South	Matthew Kendal Richardson	Liberal-Conservative	1900	1st term
Haldimand and Monck	Andrew Thorburn Thompson	Liberal	1900	1st term
Halton	David Henderson	Conservative	1887, 1888	5th term*
Hamilton*	Francis Carmichael Bruce	Conservative	1900	1st term
Hamilton*	Samuel Barker	Conservative	1900	1st term
Hastings East	William Barton Northrup	Conservative	1892, 1900	2nd term*
Hastings North	Alexander Augustus Williamson Carscallen	Conservative	1892	3rd term
Hastings West	Henry Corby Jr. (resigned 28 February 1901)	Conservative	1888	4th term
Hastings West	Edward Guss Porter (by-election of 1902-01-15)	Conservative	1902	1st term
Huron East	Peter Macdonald	Liberal	1887	4th term
Huron South	George McEwen	Liberal	1900	1st term
Huron West	Robert Holmes	Liberal	1899	2nd term
Kent	George Stephens	Liberal	1900	1st term
Kingston	Byron Moffatt Britton	Liberal	1896	2nd term
Kingston	William Harty (by-election of 1902-01-15)	Liberal	1902	1st term
Lambton East	Oliver Simmons (died 11 November 1903)	Conservative	1900	1st term
Lambton East	Joseph Elijah Armstrong (by-election of 1904-02-16)	Conservative	1904	1st term
Lambton West	Thomas George Johnston	Liberal	1898	2nd term
Lanark North	Bennett Rosamond	Conservative	1891	3rd term
Lanark South	John Graham Haggart	Conservative	1872	8th term
Leeds North and Grenville North	John Reeve Lavell	Conservative	1900	1st term
Leeds South	George Taylor	Conservative	1882	5th term
Lennox	Uriah Wilson	Conservative	1892	3rd term
Lincoln and Niagara	Edward Arthur Lancaster	Conservative	1900	1st term
London	**Charles Smith Hyman**	Liberal	1891, 1900	2nd term*
Middlesex East	James Gilmour (politician)	Conservative	1896	2nd term
Middlesex North	John Sherritt	Conservative	1900	1st term
Middlesex South	Malcolm McGugan	Liberal	1896	2nd term
Middlesex West	William Samuel Calvert	Liberal	1896	2nd term
Muskoka and Parry Sound	George McCormick	Liberal-Conservative	1896	2nd term
Nipissing	Charles Arthur McCool	Liberal	1900	1st term
Norfolk North	John Charlton	Liberal	1872	8th term
Norfolk South	David Tisdale	Conservative	1887	4th term
Northumberland East	Edward Cochrane	Conservative	1887	4th term
Northumberland West	John B. McColl	Liberal	1900	1st term
Ontario North	Angus McLeod (died in office)	Liberal-Conservative	1900	1st term
Ontario North	George Davidson Grant (by-election of 1903-03-10)	Liberal	1903	1st term
Ontario South	William Ross	Liberal	1900	1st term
Ontario West	Isaac James Gould	Liberal	1900	2nd term
Ottawa (City of)*	Napoléon Antoine Belcourt (†)	Liberal	1896	2nd term
Ottawa (City of)*	Thomas Birkett	Conservative	1900	1st term
Oxford North	**James Sutherland** (until ministerial appointment)	Liberal	1880	6th term
Oxford North	**James Sutherland** (by-election of 1902-01-29)	Liberal	1880	6th term
Oxford South	**Richard John Cartwright**	Liberal	1867	9th term
Peel	Richard Blain	Conservative	1900	1st term
Perth North	Alexander Ferguson Maclaren	Conservative	1896	2nd term
Perth South	Dilman Kinsey Erb	Liberal	1896	2nd term
Peterborough East	John Lang	Independent Liberal	1896	2nd term
Peterborough West	James Kendry	Conservative	1887	4th term
Prescott	Isidore Proulx	Liberal	1891	3rd term
Prince Edward	George Oscar Alcorn	Conservative	1900	1st term
Renfrew North	Thomas Mackie	Liberal	1896	2nd term
Renfrew South	Aaron Abel Wright	Liberal	1900	1st term
Russell	William Cameron Edwards (until Senate appointment)	Liberal	1887	4th term
Russell	David Wardrope Wallace (by-election of 1903-04-20)	Liberal	1903	1st term
Simcoe East	William Humphrey Bennett	Conservative	1892	3rd term
Simcoe North	Leighton Goldie McCarthy	Independent	1898	2nd term
Simcoe South	Haughton Lennox	Conservative	1900	1st term
Toronto Centre	William Rees Brock	Conservative	1900	1st term
Toronto East	Albert Edward Kemp	Conservative	1900	1st term
Victoria North	Sam Hughes	Liberal-Conservative	1892	3rd term
Victoria South	Adam Edward Vrooman	Conservative	1900	1st term
Waterloo North	Joseph Emm Seagram	Conservative	1882	5th term
Waterloo South	George Adam Clare	Conservative	1900	1st term
Welland	William Manly German	Liberal	1891, 1900	2nd term*
Wellington Centre	John McGowan	Liberal-Conservative	1900	1st term
Wellington North	Edwin Tolton	Conservative	1900	1st term
Wellington South	Hugh Guthrie	Liberal	1900	1st term
Wentworth North and Brant	**William Paterson**	Liberal	1882	5th term
Wentworth South	E. D. Smith	Conservative	1900	1st term
West Toronto*	Edmund Boyd Osler	Conservative	1896	2nd term
West Toronto*	Edward Frederick Clarke	Conservative	1896	2nd term
York East	William Findlay Maclean	Independent Conservative	1892	3rd term
York North	**William Mulock**	Liberal	1882	5th term
York West	Nathaniel Clarke Wallace	Conservative	1878	6th term
York West	Archibald Campbell (by-election of 1902-01-15)	Liberal	1902	1st term

=== Prince Edward Island ===
Electoral district	Name	Party	First elected/previously elected	No. of terms
East Prince	Alfred Alexander Lefurgey	Conservative	1900	1st term
East Queen's	Donald Alexander Mackinnon (until election voided 11 February 1901)	Liberal	1900	1st term
East Queen's	Donald Alexander Mackinnon (by-election of 1901-03-20)	Liberal	1900	1st term
King's	James Joseph Hughes	Liberal	1900	1st term
West Prince	Edward Hackett	Liberal-Conservative	1878, 1896	4th term*
West Queen's	**Louis Henry Davies** (until 25 September 1901 judicial appointment)	Liberal	1882	5th term
West Queen's	Donald Farquharson (by-election of 1902-01-15, died 26 June 1903)	Liberal	1902	1st term
West Queen's	Horace Haszard (by-election of 1904-02-16)	Liberal	1904	1st term

=== Quebec ===
Electoral district	Name	Party	First elected/previously elected	No. of terms
Argenteuil	Thomas Christie (died in office)	Liberal	1875, 1891	4th term*
Argenteuil	Thomas Christie, Jr. (by-election of 1902-12-03)	Liberal	1902	1st term
Bagot	Joseph Edmond Marcile	Liberal	1898	2nd term
Beauce	Joseph Godbout (until Senate appointment)	Liberal	1887	4th term
Beauce	Henri Sévérin Béland (by-election of 1902-01-08)	Liberal	1902	1st term
Beauharnois	George di Madeiros Loy (until election voided)	Liberal	1900	1st term
Beauharnois	George di Madeiros Loy (by-election of 1902-03-26)	Liberal	1900	1st term
Bellechasse	Onésiphore Ernest Talbot	Liberal	1896	2nd term
Berthier	Joseph Éloi Archambault	Liberal	1900	2nd term
Bonaventure	Charles Marcil	Liberal	1900	1st term
Brome	**Sydney Arthur Fisher**	Liberal	1896	3rd term
Chambly—Verchères	Victor Geoffrion	Liberal	1900	2nd term
Champlain	Jeffrey Alexandre Rousseau	Liberal	1900	2nd term
Charlevoix	Louis Charles Alphonse Angers	Liberal	1896	3rd term
Châteauguay	James Pollock Brown	Liberal	1891	3rd term
Chicoutimi—Saguenay	Joseph Girard	Conservative	1900	1st term
Compton	Rufus Henry Pope	Conservative	1889	4th term
Dorchester	Jean-Baptiste Morin	Conservative	1896	2nd term
Drummond—Arthabaska	Louis Lavergne	Liberal	1897	2nd term
Gaspé	**Rodolphe Lemieux** (until 29 January 1904 Solicitor General appointment)	Liberal	1896	2nd term
Gaspé	**Rodolphe Lemieux** (by-election of 1904-02-20)	Liberal	1896	2nd term
Hochelaga	Joseph Alexandre Camille Madore (until December 1903 judicial appointment)	Liberal	1896	2nd term
Hochelaga	Louis Alfred Adhémar Rivet (by-election of 1904-02-16)	Liberal	1904	1st term
Huntingdon	William Scott Maclaren	Liberal	1900	1st term
Jacques Cartier	Frederick Debartzch Monk	Conservative	1896	2nd term
Joliette	Charles Bazinet	Liberal	1896	2nd term
Kamouraska	**Henry George Carroll** (until 10 February 1902 Solicitor General appointment)	Liberal	1891	3rd term
Kamouraska	**Henry George Carroll** (by-election of 1902-02-28, until 29 January 1904 judicial appointment)	Liberal	1891	3rd term
Kamouraska	Ernest Lapointe (by-election of 1904-02-12)	Liberal	1904	1st term
Labelle	Joseph Henri Napoléon Bourassa	Liberal	1896	2nd term
Laprairie—Napierville	Dominique Monet	Liberal	1891	3rd term
L'Assomption	Romuald-Charlemagne Laurier	Liberal	1900	1st term
Laval	Thomas Fortin (until 25 September 1901 judicial appointment)	Liberal	1896	2nd term
Laval	Joseph-Édouard-Émile Léonard (by-election of 1902-01-15)	Conservative	1902	1st term
Lévis	Louis Julien Demers	Liberal	1899	2nd term
L'Islet	Alphonse Arthur Miville Déchêne (until 13 May 1901 Senate appointment)	Liberal	1896	2nd term
L'Islet	Onésiphore Carbonneau (by-election of 1902-01-15)	Liberal	1902	1st term
Lotbinière	Edmond Fortier	Liberal	1900	2nd term
Maisonneuve	**Joseph Raymond Fournier Préfontaine** (until 11 November 1902 ministerial appointment)	Liberal	1886	5th term
Maisonneuve	**Joseph Raymond Fournier Préfontaine** (by-election of 1902-12-09)	Liberal	1886	5th term
Maskinongé	Joseph Hormidas Legris (until 10 February 1903 Senate appointment)	Liberal	1891	3rd term
Maskinongé	Hormidas Mayrand (by-election of 1903-03-03)	Liberal	1903	1st term
Mégantic	Georges Turcot	Liberal	1887, 1896	3rd term*
Missisquoi	Daniel Bishop Meigs	Liberal	1888, 1896	3rd term*
Montcalm	François Octave Dugas	Liberal	1900	1st term
Montmagny	Pierre-Raymond-Léonard Martineau (died 31 August 1903)	Liberal	1898	2nd term
Montmagny	Armand Renaud Lavergne (by-election of 1904-02-16)	Liberal	1904	1st term
Montmorency	Thomas Chase Casgrain	Conservative	1896	2nd term
Nicolet	Georges Ball	Conservative	1900	1st term
Pontiac	Thomas Murray	Liberal	1891, 1900	2nd term*
Portneuf	Michel-Siméon Delisle	Liberal	1900	1st term
Quebec-Centre	Arthur Cyrille Albert Malouin	Liberal	1898	2nd term
Quebec County	**Charles Fitzpatrick**	Liberal	1896	2nd term
Quebec East	**Wilfrid Laurier**	Liberal	1874	7th term
Quebec West	**Richard Reid Dobell** (died 11 January 1902)	Liberal	1896	2nd term
Quebec West	William Power (by-election of 1902-01-29)	Liberal	1902	1st term
Richelieu	Arthur Aimé Bruneau	Liberal	1892	3rd term
Richmond—Wolfe	Edmund William Tobin	Liberal	1900	1st term
Rimouski	Jean Auguste Ross	Liberal	1897	2nd term
Rouville	**Louis Philippe Brodeur** (until 19 January 1904 ministerial appointment) (†)	Liberal	1878	6th term
Rouville	**Louis Philippe Brodeur** (by-election of 1904-01-30) (†)	Liberal	1878	6th term
St. Anne	Daniel Gallery	Liberal	1900	1st term
St. Antoine	Thomas George Roddick	Conservative	1896	2nd term
St. Hyacinthe	**Michel Esdras Bernier** (until 19 January 1904 Railway Commissioner appointment)	Liberal	1882	5th term
St. Hyacinthe	Jean Baptiste Blanchet (by-election of 1904-02-16)	Liberal	1904	1st term
St. James	Odilon Desmarais (until 25 June 1901 judicial appointment)	Liberal	1896	2nd term
St. James	Joseph Brunet (by-election of 1902-01-15, until election voided 22 December 1902)	Liberal	1902	1st term
St. James	Honoré Hippolyte Achille Gervais (by-election of 1904-02-16)	Liberal	1904	1st term
St. Johns—Iberville	Louis Philippe Demers	Liberal	1900	1st term
St. Lawrence	Robert Bickerdike	Liberal	1900	1st term
St. Mary	**Joseph Israël Tarte**	Liberal	1891, 1893, 1896	4th term*
Shefford	Charles Henry Parmelee	Liberal	1896	2nd term
Town of Sherbrooke	John McIntosh	Conservative	1900	2nd term
Soulanges	Augustin Bourbonnais	Liberal	1896	2nd term
Stanstead	Henry Lovell	Liberal	1900	1st term
Témiscouata	Charles Arthur Gauvreau	Liberal	1897	2nd term
Terrebonne	Raymond Préfontaine (until 11 November 1902 ministerial appointment)	Liberal	1896	2nd term
Terrebonne	Samuel Desjardins (by-election of 1903-02-24)	Liberal	1902	1st term
Three Rivers and St. Maurice	Jacques Bureau	Liberal	1900	1st term
Two Mountains	Joseph Arthur Calixte Éthier (until election voided 6 August 1902)	Liberal	1896	2nd term
Two Mountains	Joseph Arthur Calixte Éthier (by-election of 1903-02-24)	Liberal	1896	2nd term
Vaudreuil	Henry Stanislas Harwood	Liberal	1891	3rd term
Wright	Louis Napoléon Champagne	Liberal	1897	2nd term
Yamaska	Roch Moïse Samuel Mignault	Liberal	1891	3rd term

=== Yukon ===
Electoral district	Name	Party	First elected/previously elected	No. of terms
Yukon	James Hamilton Ross (by-election of 1902-12-02)	Liberal	1902	1st term

== By-elections ==
By-election	Date	Incumbent	Party	Winner	Party	Cause	Retained
Guysborough	March 16, 1904	Duncan Cameron Fraser	Liberal	John Howard Sinclair	Liberal	Appointed to Supreme Court of Nova Scotia	Yes
Gaspé	February 20, 1904	Rodolphe Lemieux	Liberal	Rodolphe Lemieux	Liberal	Recontested upon appointment as Solicitor-General	Yes
Lambton East	February 16, 1904	Oliver Simmons	Conservative	Joseph Elijah Armstrong	Conservative	Death	Yes
St. Hyacinthe	February 16, 1904	Michel Esdras Bernier	Liberal	Jean Baptiste Blanchet	Liberal	Appointed a Railway Commissioner	Yes
City of St. John	February 16, 1904	Andrew George Blair	Liberal	John Waterhouse Daniel	Conservative	Appointed head of the Board of Railway Commissioners	No
Bruce East	February 16, 1904	Henry Cargill	Conservative	James J. Donnelly	Conservative	Death	Yes
St. James	February 16, 1904	Joseph Brunet	Liberal	Honoré Hippolyte Achille Gervais	Liberal	Election declared void	Yes
West Queen's	February 16, 1904	Donald Farquharson	Liberal	Horace Haszard	Liberal	Death	Yes
Montmagny	February 16, 1904	Pierre-Raymond-Léonard Martineau	Liberal	Armand Lavergne	Liberal	Death	Yes
Hochelaga	February 16, 1904	Joseph Alexandre Camille Madore	Liberal	Louis-Alfred-Adhémar Rivet	Liberal	Appointed Puisne Judge of the Supreme Court of Quebec	Yes
Kamouraska	February 12, 1904	Henry George Carroll	Liberal	Ernest Lapointe	Liberal	Appointed a judge	Yes
Rouville	January 30, 1904	Louis-Philippe Brodeur	Liberal	Louis-Philippe Brodeur	Liberal	Recontested upon appointment as Minister of Inland Revenue	Yes
Westmorland	January 30, 1904	Henry Emmerson	Liberal	Henry Emmerson	Liberal	Recontested upon appointment as Minister of Railways and Canals	Yes
Russell	April 20, 1903	William C. Edwards	Liberal	David Wardrope Wallace	Liberal	Called to Senate	Yes
Ontario North	March 10, 1903	Angus McLeod	Liberal-Conservative	George Davidson Grant	Liberal	Death	No
Maskinongé	March 3, 1903	Joseph-Hormisdas Legris	Liberal	Hormidas Mayrand	Liberal	Called to Senate	Yes
Terrebonne	February 24, 1903	Raymond Préfontaine	Liberal	Samuel Desjardins	Liberal	Recontested upon ministerial appointment. Préfontaine was elected in two ridings simultaneously and chose to stand for re-election in Maisonneuve	Yes
Two Mountains	February 24, 1903	Joseph Arthur Calixte Éthier	Liberal	Joseph Arthur Calixte Éthier	Liberal	Election declared void	Yes
Grey North	February 24, 1903	Edward Henry Horsey	Liberal	Thomas Inkerman Thomson	Conservative	Death	No
Burrard	February 4, 1903	George Ritchie Maxwell	Liberal	Robert George Macpherson	Liberal	Death	Yes
Maisonneuve	December 9, 1902	Raymond Préfontaine	Liberal	Raymond Préfontaine	Liberal	Recontested upon appointment as Minister of Marine and Fisheries	Yes
Argenteuil	December 3, 1902	Thomas Christie	Liberal	Thomas Christie, Jr.	Liberal	Death	Yes
Yarmouth	December 3, 1902	Thomas Barnard Flint	Liberal	Bowman Brown Law	Liberal	Appointed Clerk of the House of Commons	Yes
Yukon	December 2, 1902	New Seat		James Hamilton Ross	Liberal	Newly created electoral district under The Yukon Territory Representation Act 1902	N.A.
Beauharnois	March 26, 1902	George di Madeiros Loy	Liberal	George di Madeiros Loy	Liberal	Election declared void	Yes
Kamouraska	February 28, 1902	Henry George Carroll	Liberal	Henry George Carroll	Liberal	Recontested upon appointment as Solicitor General	Yes
Lisgar	February 18, 1902	Robert Lorne Richardson	Independent	Duncan Alexander Stewart	Liberal	Election declared void	No
Quebec West	January 29, 1902	Richard Reid Dobell	Liberal	William Power	Liberal	Death	Yes
Oxford North	January 29, 1902	James Sutherland	Liberal	James Sutherland	Liberal	Recontested upon appointment as Minister of Marine and Fisheries	Yes
Victoria	January 28, 1902	Edward Gawler Prior	Conservative	George Riley	Liberal	Election declared void	No
Laval	January 15, 1902	Thomas Fortin	Liberal	Joseph-Édouard-Émile Léonard	Conservative	Appointed a judge of the Superior Court of Quebec	No
Addington	January 15, 1902	John William Bell	Conservative	Melzar Avery	Conservative	Death	Yes
Durham West	January 15, 1902	Charles Jonas Thornton	Liberal	Robert Beith	Conservative	Election declared void.	No
St. James	January 15, 1902	Odilon Desmarais	Liberal	Joseph-Édouard-Émile Léonard	Liberal	Appointed a judge of the Superior Court of Quebec	Yes
York West	January 15, 1902	Nathaniel Clarke Wallace	Conservative	Archibald Campbell	Liberal	Death	No
L'Islet	January 15, 1902	Arthur Miville Déchêne	Liberal	Onésiphore Carbonneau	Liberal	Called to the Senate	Yes
West Queen's	January 15, 1902	Louis Henry Davies	Liberal	Donald Farquharson	Liberal	Appointed a justice of the Supreme Court of Canada	Yes
Kingston	January 15, 1902	Byron Moffatt Britton	Liberal	William Harty	Liberal	Appointed a judge of the Court of King's Bench for Ontario	Yes
Hastings West	January 15, 1902	Henry Corby	Conservative	Edward Guss Porter	Conservative	Resignation	Yes
Beauce	January 8, 1902	Joseph Godbout	Liberal	Henri Sévérin Béland	Liberal	Called to the Senate	Yes
York	December 28, 1901	Alexander Gibson	Liberal	Alexander Gibson	Liberal	Election declared void	Yes
East Queen's	March 20, 1901	Donald Alexander MacKinnon	Liberal	Donald Alexander MacKinnon	Liberal	Election declared void	Yes
Bruce North	March 20, 1901	Alexander McNeill	Liberal-Conservative	James Halliday	Conservative	Election declared void	Yes
