= 10th Canadian Parliament =

1905–08 legislative term

- Majority parliament
- Jan. 11, 1905 – Sep. 17, 1908

Parliament leaders
- Prime minister: Sir Wilfrid Laurier; Jul. 11, 1896 – Oct. 6, 1911
- Cabinet: 8th Canadian Ministry
- Leader of the Opposition: Sir Robert Borden; Feb. 6, 1901 – Oct. 9, 1911

Party caucuses
- Government: Liberal Party
- Opposition: Conservative Party & Liberal-Conservative

House of Commons
- Seating arrangements of the House of Commons
- Speaker of the Commons: Robert Franklin Sutherland; Jan. 11, 1905 – Jan. 19, 1909

Senate
- Speaker of the Senate: Raoul Dandurand; Jan. 9, 1905 – Jan. 13, 1909
- James Kirkpatrick Kerr; Jan. 14, 1909 – Oct. 22, 1911

Sovereign
- Monarch: Edward VII; Jan. 22, 1901 – May. 6, 1910
- Governor general: The Earl Grey; Dec. 10, 1904 – Oct. 13, 1911

Sessions
- 1st session January 11, 1905 – July 20, 1905
- 2nd session March 8, 1906 – July 13, 1906
- 3rd session November 22, 1906 – April 27, 1907
- 4th session November 28, 1907 – July 20, 1908
| ← 9th | → 11th |

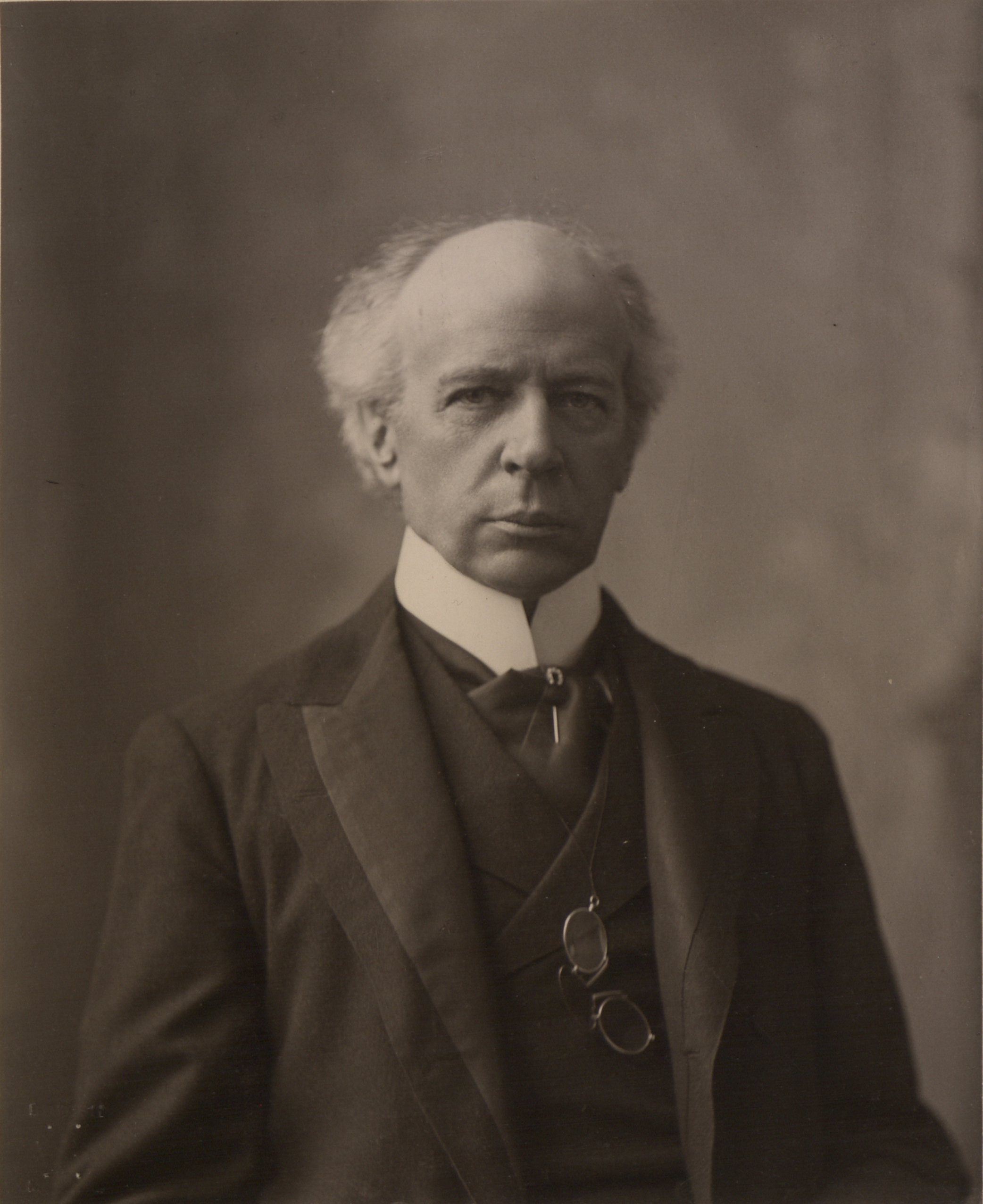
Sir Wilfrid Laurier was Prime Minister during the 10th Canadian Parliament.

The 10th Canadian Parliament was in session from January 11, 1905, until September 17, 1908 (3 years and 251 days). The membership was set by the 1904 federal election on November 3, 1904. It was dissolved prior to the 1908 election.

It was controlled by a Liberal Party majority under Prime Minister Wilfrid Laurier and the 8th Canadian Ministry. The Official Opposition was the Conservative/Liberal-Conservative, led by Robert Borden.

The Speaker was Robert Franklin Sutherland. See also List of Canadian electoral districts 1903–1907 for a list of the ridings in this parliament.

There were four sessions of the 10th Parliament:

| Session | Start | End |
|---|---|---|
| 1st | January 11, 1905 | July 20, 1905 |
| 2nd | March 8, 1906 | July 13, 1906 |
| 3rd | November 22, 1906 | April 27, 1907 |
| 4th | November 28, 1907 | July 20, 1908 |

== Major legislation ==
=== Alberta Act ===
The Alberta Act, S. C. 1905, c. 3 established the new province of Alberta, effective September 1, 1905. Its long title is An Act to establish and provide for the government of the Province of Alberta. The Act received royal assent on July 20, 1905. The Alberta Act is part of the Constitution of Canada.

=== Saskatchewan Act ===
The Saskatchewan Act, S. C. 1905, c. 42 established the new province of Saskatchewan, effective September 1, 1905. Its long title is An Act to establish and provide for the government of the Province of Saskatchewan. The Act received royal assent on July 20, 1905. The Saskatchewan Act is part of the Constitution of Canada.

=== Juvenile Delinquents Act ===
The Juvenile Delinquents Act (French: Loi sur les jeunes délinquants), S.C. 1908, c. 40 was a law passed by the Parliament of Canada to improve its handling of juvenile crime. The act established procedures for the handling of juvenile offenses, including the government assuming control of juvenile offenders. It was revised in 1929 and superseded in 1984 by the Young Offenders Act.

== List of members ==
Following is a full list of members of the tenth Parliament listed first by province, then by electoral district.

Key:

- Party leaders are italicized.
- Cabinet ministers are in **boldface**.
- The Prime Minister is **both**.
- The Speaker is indicated by "(†)".

Electoral districts denoted by an asterisk (*) indicates that district was represented by two members.

=== Alberta/Saskatchewan ===
Alberta and Saskatchewan were established as Canadian provinces on 1 September 1905 from parts of what had formerly been the Northwest Territories. The old NWT electoral districts were not formally abolished until the 1907 redistribution, which took the provincial boundary into account. In the meantime, three by-elections were held in districts which straddled the new border.

| Electoral district | Name | Party | First elected/previously elected | No. of terms |
|---|---|---|---|---|
| Assiniboia West | William Erskine Knowles (by-election of 1906-02-06) | Liberal | 1906 | 1st term |
| Saskatchewan | George Ewan McCraney (by-election of 1906-02-06) | Liberal | 1906 | 1st term |
| Strathcona | Wilbert McIntyre (by-election of 1906-04-05) | Liberal | 1906 | 1st term |

=== British Columbia ===
| Electoral district | Name | Party | First elected/previously elected | No. of terms |
|---|---|---|---|---|
| Comox—Atlin | William Sloan | Liberal | 1904 | 1st term |
| Kootenay | William Alfred Galliher | Liberal | 1900 | 2nd term |
| Nanaimo | Ralph Smith | Liberal | 1900 | 2nd term |
| New Westminster | James Buckham Kennedy | Liberal | 1904 | 1st term |
| Vancouver City | Robert George Macpherson | Liberal | 1903 | 2nd term |
| Victoria City | George Riley (resigned 6 February 1906 to allow seat for Templeman) | Liberal | 1902 | 2nd term |
| Victoria City | **William Templeman** (by-election of 1906-03-06) | Liberal | 1906 | 1st term |
| Yale—Cariboo | Duncan Ross | Liberal | 1904 | 1st term |

=== Manitoba ===
| Electoral district | Name | Party | First elected/previously elected | No. of terms |
|---|---|---|---|---|
| Brandon | **Clifford Sifton** | Liberal | 1896 | 3rd term |
| Dauphin | Theodore Arthur Burrows | Liberal | 1904 | 1st term |
| Lisgar | Thomas Greenway | Liberal | 1875, (Note: Huron South (Ontario)) 1904 | 2nd term* |
| Macdonald | William D. Staples | Conservative | 1904 | 1st term |
| Marquette | William James Roche | Conservative | 1896 | 3rd term |
| Portage la Prairie | John Crawford | Liberal | 1904 | 1st term |
| Provencher | Joseph Ernest Cyr | Liberal | 1904 | 1st term |
| Selkirk | Samuel Jacob Jackson | Liberal | 1904 | 1st term |
| Souris | Frederick Laurence Schaffner | Conservative | 1904 | 1st term |
| Winnipeg | David Wesley Bole | Liberal | 1904 | 1st term |

=== New Brunswick ===
| Electoral district | Name | Party | First elected/previously elected | No. of terms |
|---|---|---|---|---|
| Carleton | Frank Broadstreet Carvell | Liberal | 1904 | 1st term |
| Charlotte | Gilbert White Ganong | Liberal-Conservative | 1896 | 3rd term |
| City and County of St. John | Alfred Augustus Stockton (died 15 March 1907) | Conservative | 1904 | 1st term |
| City and County of St. John | **William Pugsley** (by-election of 1907-09-18) | Liberal | 1907 | 1st term |
| City of St. John | John Waterhouse Daniel | Conservative | 1904 | 2nd term |
| Gloucester | Onésiphore Turgeon | Liberal | 1900 | 2nd term |
| Kent | Olivier J. Leblanc | Liberal | 1900 | 2nd term |
| King's and Albert | George William Fowler | Conservative | 1900 | 2nd term |
| Northumberland | William Stewart Loggie | Liberal | 1904 | 1st term |
| Restigouche | James Reid | Liberal | 1900 | 2nd term |
| Sunbury—Queen's | Robert Duncan Wilmot | Conservative | 1887, 1900 | 4th term* |
| Victoria | John Costigan (until Senate appointment) | Liberal | 1867 | 10th term |
| Victoria | Pius Michaud (by-election of 1907-03-05) | Liberal | 1907 | 1st term |
| Westmorland | **Henry Emmerson** | Liberal | 1900 | 2nd term |
| York | Oswald Smith Crocket | Conservative | 1904 | 1st term |

=== North-West Territories ===
The regions of the North-West Territories represented in Parliament became the provinces of Alberta and Saskatchewan on 1 September 1905. Except in cases where the members resigned, NWT MPs continued to represent constituencies using the 1903 boundaries until the dissolution of the 10th Parliament.

| Electoral district | Name | Party | First elected/previously elected | No. of terms |
|---|---|---|---|---|
| Alberta (Provisional District) | John Herron | Liberal-Conservative | 1904 | 1st term |
| Assiniboia East | John Gillanders Turriff | Liberal | 1904 | 1st term |
| Assiniboia West | Thomas Walter Scott | Liberal | 1900 | 2nd term |
| Calgary | Maitland Stewart McCarthy | Conservative | 1904 | 1st term |
| Edmonton | **Frank Oliver** (until 8 April 1905 ministerial appointment) | Liberal | 1896 | 3rd term |
| Edmonton | **Frank Oliver** (by-election of 1905-04-25) | Liberal | 1896 | 3rd term |
| Humboldt | Alan Joseph Adamson | Liberal | 1904 | 1st term |
| Mackenzie | Edward L. Cash | Liberal | 1904 | 1st term |
| Qu'Appelle | Richard Stuart Lake | Conservative | 1904 | 1st term |
| Saskatchewan (Provisional District) | John Henderson Lamont | Liberal | 1904 | 1st term |
| Strathcona | Peter Talbot | Liberal | 1904 | 1st term |

=== Nova Scotia ===
| Electoral district | Name | Party | First elected/previously elected | No. of terms |
|---|---|---|---|---|
| Annapolis | Samuel Walter Willet Pickup | Liberal | 1904 | 1st term |
| Antigonish | Colin Francis McIsaac (until 3 July 1905 Railway Commissioner appointment) | Liberal | 1895 | 4th term |
| Antigonish | William Chisholm (by-election of 1905-11-22) | Liberal | 1905 | 1st term |
| Cape Breton South | Alexander Johnston | Liberal | 1900 | 2nd term |
| Colchester | Frederick Andrew Laurence (until 4 November 1907 judicial appointment) | Liberal | 1904 | 1st term |
| Colchester | John Stanfield (by-election of 1907-11-28) | Conservative | 1907 | 1st term |
| Cumberland | Hance James Logan | Liberal | 1896 | 3rd term |
| Digby | Albert James Smith Copp | Liberal | 1896 | 3rd term |
| Guysborough | John Howard Sinclair | Liberal | 1904 | 2nd term |
| Halifax* | Michael Carney | Liberal | 1904 | 1st term |
| Halifax* | William Roche | Liberal | 1900 | 2nd term |
| Hants | Judson Burpee Black | Liberal | 1904 | 1st term |
| Inverness | Angus MacLennan | Liberal | 1896 | 3rd term |
| Kings | **Frederick William Borden** | Liberal | 1874, 1887 | 7th term* |
| Lunenburg | Alexander Kenneth Maclean | Liberal | 1904 | 1st term |
| North Cape Breton and Victoria | Daniel Duncan McKenzie (until 16 February 1906 judicial appointment) | Liberal | 1904 | 1st term |
| North Cape Breton and Victoria | Alexander Charles Ross (by-election of 1906-03-14) | Liberal | 1906 | 1st term |
| Pictou | Edward Mortimer Macdonald | Liberal | 1904 | 1st term |
| Richmond | Duncan Finlayson | Liberal | 1904 | 1st term |
| Shelburne and Queen's | **William Stevens Fielding** (until election voided 8 October 1906) | Liberal | 1896 | 3rd term |
| Shelburne and Queen's | **William Stevens Fielding** (by-election of 1906-10-31) | Liberal | 1896 | 3rd term |
| Yarmouth | Bowman Brown Law | Liberal | 1902 | 2nd term |

=== Ontario ===
| Electoral district | Name | Party | First elected/previously elected | No. of terms |
|---|---|---|---|---|
| Algoma East | Albert Dyment | Liberal | 1896 | 3rd term |
| Algoma West | Arthur Cyril Boyce | Conservative | 1904 | 1st term |
| Brantford | William Foster Cockshutt | Conservative | 1904 | 1st term |
| Brant | **William Paterson** | Liberal | 1872 | 9th term |
| Brockville | Daniel Derbyshire (resigned 30 August 1907) | Liberal | 1904 | 1st term |
| Brockville | **George Perry Graham** (by-election of 1907-09-18) | Liberal | 1907 | 1st term |
| Bruce North | Leonard Thomas Bland (died 19 August 1906) | Liberal-Conservative | 1904 | 1st term |
| Bruce North | John Tolmie (by-election of 1906-10-30) | Liberal | 1896, 1906 | 3rd term* |
| Bruce South | Peter H. McKenzie | Liberal | 1904 | 1st term |
| Carleton | Edward Kidd (resigned 19 January 1905 to allow seat for Borden) | Conservative | 1900 | 2nd term |
| Carleton | Robert Laird Borden (by-election of 1905-02-04) | Conservative | 1896, (Note: Halifax) 1905 | 3rd term* |
| Dufferin | John Barr | Conservative | 1904 | 1st term |
| Dundas | Andrew Broder | Conservative | 1896 | 3rd term |
| Durham | Henry Alfred Ward | Conservative | 1885, 1900 | 4th term* |
| Elgin East | Andrew B. Ingram (resigned 8 December 1906 due to commission appointment) | Liberal-Conservative | 1891 | 4th term |
| Elgin East | David Marshall (by-election of 1906-10-04) | Conservative | 1906 | 1st term |
| Elgin West | William Jackson | Conservative | 1904 | 1st term |
| Essex North | Robert Franklin Sutherland (†) | Liberal | 1900 | 2nd term |
| Essex South | Alfred Henry Clarke | Liberal | 1904 | 1st term |
| Frontenac | Melzar Avery | Conservative | 1902 | 2nd term |
| Glengarry | Jacob Thomas Schell | Liberal | 1900 | 2nd term |
| Grenville | John Dowsley Reid | Conservative | 1896 | 3rd term |
| Grey East | Thomas Simpson Sproule | Conservative | 1878 | 7th term |
| Grey North | William Pattison Telford | Liberal | 1904 | 1st term |
| Grey South | Henry Horton Miller | Liberal | 1904 | 1st term |
| Haldimand | Francis Ramsey Lalor | Conservative | 1904 | 1st term |
| Halton | David Henderson | Conservative | 1887, 1888 | 6th term* |
| Hamilton East | Samuel Barker | Conservative | 1900 | 2nd term |
| Hamilton West | Adam Zimmerman | Liberal | 1904 | 1st term |
| Hastings East | William Barton Northrup | Conservative | 1892, 1900 | 3rd term* |
| Hastings West | Edward Guss Porter | Conservative | 1902 | 2nd term |
| Huron East | Thomas Chisholm | Conservative | 1904 | 1st term |
| Huron South | Benjamin B. Gunn (died 9 December 1907) | Conservative | 1904 | 1st term |
| Huron South | Murdo Young McLean (by-election of 1908-01-22) | Liberal | 1908 | 1st term |
| Huron West | Edward Norman Lewis | Conservative | 1904 | 1st term |
| Kent East | David Alexander Gordon | Liberal | 1904 | 1st term |
| Kent West | Herbert Sylvester Clements | Conservative | 1904 | 1st term |
| Kingston | William Harty | Liberal | 1902 | 2nd term |
| Lambton East | Joseph Elijah Armstrong | Conservative | 1904 | 2nd term |
| Lambton West | Thomas George Johnston (died 4 July 1905) | Liberal | 1898 | 3rd term |
| Lambton West | Frederick Forsyth Pardee (by-election of 1905-11-22) | Liberal | 1905 | 1st term |
| Lanark North | Thomas Boyd Caldwell | Liberal | 1904 | 1st term |
| Lanark South | John Graham Haggart | Conservative | 1872 | 9th term |
| Leeds | George Taylor | Conservative | 1882 | 6th term |
| Lennox and Addington | Uriah Wilson | Conservative | 1892 | 4th term |
| Lincoln | Edward Arthur Lancaster | Conservative | 1900 | 2nd term |
| London | **Charles Smith Hyman** (until 22 May 1905 ministerial appointment) | Liberal | 1891, 1900 | 3rd term* |
| London | **Charles Smith Hyman** (by-election of 1905-06-06, resigned 11 April 1907) | Liberal | 1891, 1900 | 3rd term* |
| London | Thomas Beattie (by-election of 1907-10-29) | Conservative | 1907 | 1st term |
| Middlesex East | Peter Elson | Conservative | 1904 | 1st term |
| Middlesex North | Valentine Ratz | Liberal | 1896, 1904 | 2nd term* |
| Middlesex West | William Samuel Calvert | Liberal | 1896 | 3rd term |
| Muskoka | William Wright | Conservative | 1904 | 1st term |
| Nipissing | Charles Arthur McCool | Liberal | 1900 | 2nd term |
| Norfolk | David Tisdale | Conservative | 1887 | 5th term |
| Northumberland East | Edward Cochrane (died in office) | Conservative | 1887 | 5th term |
| Northumberland East | Charles Lewis Owen (by-election of 1907-10-29) | Conservative | 1907 | 1st term |
| Northumberland West | John B. McColl | Liberal | 1900 | 2nd term |
| Ontario North | George Davidson Grant | Liberal | 1903 | 2nd term |
| Ontario South | Peter Christie | Conservative | 1904 | 1st term |
| Ottawa (City of)* | Napoléon Antoine Belcourt (until Senate appointment) | Liberal | 1896 | 3rd term |
| Ottawa (City of)* | Robert Stewart | Liberal | 1904 | 1st term |
| Ottawa (City of)* | Jean-Baptiste Thomas Caron (by-election of 1907-12-23, replaces Belcourt) | Liberal | 1907 | 1st term |
| Oxford North | **James Sutherland** (died in office) | Liberal | 1880 | 7th term |
| Oxford North | George Smith (by-election of 1905-06-13) | Liberal | 1905 | 1st term |
| Oxford South | **Malcolm Smith Schell** | Liberal | 1904 | 1st term |
| Parry Sound | Robert James Watson | Liberal | 1904 | 1st term |
| Peel | Richard Blain | Conservative | 1900 | 2nd term |
| Perth North | Alexander Ferguson Maclaren | Conservative | 1896 | 3rd term |
| Perth South | Gilbert Howard McIntyre | Liberal | 1904 | 1st term |
| Peterborough East | John Finlay | Liberal | 1904 | 1st term |
| Peterborough West | Robert Richard Hall | Liberal | 1904 | 1st term |
| Prescott | Edmond Proulx | Liberal | 1904 | 1st term |
| Prince Edward | George Oscar Alcorn | Conservative | 1900 | 2nd term |
| Renfrew North | Peter White (died in office) | Conservative | 1874, 1876, 1904 | 7th term* |
| Renfrew North | Gerald Verner White (by-election of 1906-10-09) | Conservative | 1906 | 1st term |
| Renfrew South | Aaron Abel Wright | Liberal | 1900 | 2nd term |
| Russell | **Norman Frank Wilson** | Liberal | 1904 | 1st term |
| Simcoe East | William Humphrey Bennett | Conservative | 1892 | 4th term |
| Simcoe North | Leighton Goldie McCarthy | Independent | 1892 | 4th term |
| Simcoe South | Haughton Lennox | Conservative | 1900 | 2nd term |
| Stormont | Robert Abercrombie Pringle | Conservative | 1900 | 2nd term |
| Thunder Bay and Rainy River | James Conmee | Liberal | 1904 | 1st term |
| Toronto Centre | Edward Frederick Clarke | Conservative | 1896 | 3rd term |
| Toronto Centre | Edmund James Bristol (by-election of 1905-04-11) | Conservative | 1905 | 1st term |
| Toronto East | Albert Edward Kemp | Conservative | 1900 | 2nd term |
| Toronto North | George Eulas Foster | Conservative | 1882, (Note: King's/York (New Brunswick)) 1904 | 5th term* |
| Toronto South | Angus Claude Macdonell | Conservative | 1904 | 1st term |
| Toronto West | Edmund Boyd Osler | Conservative | 1896 | 3rd term |
| Victoria | Sam Hughes | Liberal-Conservative | 1892 | 4th term |
| Waterloo North | Joseph Emm Seagram | Conservative | 1882 | 6th term |
| Waterloo South | George Adam Clare | Conservative | 1900 | 2nd term |
| Welland | William Manly German | Liberal | 1891, 1900 | 3rd term* |
| Wellington North | Thomas Martin (died in office) | Liberal | 1904 | 1st term |
| Wellington North | Alexander Munro Martin (by-election of 1907-10-29) | Liberal | 1907 | 1st term |
| Wellington South | Hugh Guthrie | Liberal | 1900 | 2nd term |
| Wentworth | E. D. Smith (until election voided) | Conservative | 1900 | 2nd term |
| Wentworth | E. D. Smith (by-election of 1905-11-22) | Conservative | 1900 | 2nd term |
| York Centre | Archibald Campbell (until Senate appointment) | Liberal | 1902 | 2nd term |
| York Centre | Peter Douglas McLean (by-election of 1907-12-23) | Liberal | 1907 | 1st term |
| York North | **William Mulock** (until judicial appointment) | Liberal | 1882 | 6th term |
| York North | **Allen Bristol Aylesworth** (by-election of 1905-11-22) | Liberal | 1905 | 1st term |
| York South | William Findlay Maclean | Independent Conservative | 1892 | 4th term |

=== Prince Edward Island ===
| Electoral district | Name | Party | First elected/previously elected | No. of terms |
|---|---|---|---|---|
| King's | James Joseph Hughes | Liberal | 1900 | 2nd term |
| Prince | Alfred Alexander Lefurgey | Conservative | 1900 | 2nd term |
| Queen's* | Alexander Martin | Conservative | 1896, 1904 | 2nd term* |
| Queen's* | Angus Alexander McLean | Conservative | 1904 | 1st term |

=== Quebec ===
| Electoral district | Name | Party | First elected/previously elected | No. of terms |
|---|---|---|---|---|
| Argenteuil | George Halsey Perley | Conservative | 1904 | 1st term |
| Bagot | Joseph Edmond Marcile | Liberal | 1898 | 3rd term |
| Beauce | Henri Sévérin Béland | Liberal | 1902 | 2nd term |
| Beauharnois | Joseph Gédéon Horace Bergeron | Conservative | 1879, 1904 | 6th term* |
| Bellechasse | Onésiphore Ernest Talbot | Liberal | 1896 | 3rd term |
| Berthier | Joseph Éloi Archambault | Liberal | 1900 | 3rd term |
| Bonaventure | Charles Marcil | Liberal | 1900 | 2nd term |
| Brome | **Sydney Arthur Fisher** | Liberal | 1896 | 3rd term |
| Chambly—Verchères | Victor Geoffrion | Liberal | 1900 | 3rd term |
| Champlain | Jeffrey Alexandre Rousseau | Liberal | 1900 | 3rd term |
| Charlevoix | Joseph David Rodolphe Forget | Conservative | 1904 | 1st term |
| Chicoutimi—Saguenay | Joseph Girard | Conservative | 1900 | 2nd term |
| Châteauguay | James Pollock Brown | Liberal | 1891 | 4th term |
| Compton | Aylmer Byron Hunt (until election voided 22 November 1905) | Liberal | 1904 | 1st term |
| Compton | Aylmer Byron Hunt (by-election of 1906-01-04) | Liberal | 1904 | 1st term |
| Dorchester | Jean-Baptiste Morin | Conservative | 1896 | 3rd term |
| Drummond—Arthabaska | Louis Lavergne | Liberal | 1897 | 3rd term |
| Gaspé | **Rodolphe Lemieux** | Liberal | 1896 | 3rd term |
| Hochelaga | Louis Alfred Adhémar Rivet | Liberal | 1904 | 2nd term |
| Huntingdon | Robert Nelson Walsh | Conservative | 1904 | 1st term |
| Jacques Cartier | Frederick Debartzch Monk | Conservative | 1896 | 3rd term |
| Joliette | Joseph Adélard Dubeau | Liberal | 1904 | 1st term |
| Kamouraska | Ernest Lapointe | Liberal | 1904 | 2nd term |
| Labelle | Joseph Henri Napoléon Bourassa (resigned 29 October 1907 for provincial politics) | Liberal | 1896 | 3rd term |
| Labelle | Charles Beautrom Major (by-election of 1907-12-23) | Liberal | 1907 | 1st term |
| Laprairie—Napierville | Roch Lanctôt | Liberal | 1904 | 1st term |
| L'Assomption | Romuald-Charlemagne Laurier (died 28 December 1906) | Liberal | 1900 | 2nd term |
| L'Assomption | Ruben Charles Laurier (by-election of 1907-03-07) | Liberal | 1907 | 1st term |
| Laval | Joseph-Édouard-Émile Léonard | Conservative | 1902 | 2nd term |
| Lévis | Louis Julien Demers (died 29 April 1905) | Liberal | 1899 | 3rd term |
| Lévis | Louis Auguste Carrier (by-election of 1905-06-06) | Liberal | 1905 | 1st term |
| L'Islet | Eugène Paquet | Conservative | 1904 | 1st term |
| Lotbinière | Edmond Fortier | Liberal | 1900 | 3rd term |
| Maisonneuve | **Joseph Raymond Fournier Préfontaine** (died 25 December 1905) | Liberal | 1886 | 6th term |
| Maisonneuve | Alphonse Verville (by-election of 1906-02-23) | Labour | 1906 | 1st term |
| Maskinongé | Hormidas Mayrand | Liberal | 1903 | 2nd term |
| Mégantic | François Théodore Savoie | Liberal | 1904 | 1st term |
| Missisquoi | Daniel Bishop Meigs | Liberal | 1888, 1896 | 4th term* |
| Montcalm | François Octave Dugas | Liberal | 1900 | 2nd term |
| Montmagny | Armand Renaud Lavergne | Liberal | 1904 | 2nd term |
| Montmorency | Georges Parent | Liberal | 1904 | 1st term |
| Nicolet | Rodolphe Lemieux (until 3 December 1906 to retain seat in Gaspé) | Liberal | 1896 | 3rd term |
| Nicolet | Charles Ramsay Devlin (by-election of 1906-12-29, resigned 29 October 1907) | Liberal | 1906 | 1st term |
| Nicolet | Gustave Adolphe Turcotte (by-election of 1907-12-30) | Liberal | 1907 | 1st term |
| Pontiac | Gerald Hugh Brabazon | Conservative | 1904 | 1st term |
| Portneuf | Michel-Siméon Delisle | Liberal | 1900 | 2nd term |
| Quebec-Centre | Arthur Cyrille Albert Malouin (until 7 January 1905 judicial appointment) | Liberal | 1898 | 3rd term |
| Quebec-Centre | Arthur Lachance (by-election of 1905-01-19) | Liberal | 1905 | 1st term |
| Quebec County | **Charles Fitzpatrick** (until 4 June 1906 judicial appointment) | Liberal | 1896 | 3rd term |
| Quebec County | Lorenzo Robitaille (by-election of 1906-10-23) | Independent Liberal | 1906 | 1st term |
| Quebec East | **Wilfrid Laurier** | Liberal | 1874 | 8th term |
| Quebec West | William Power | Liberal | 1902 | 2nd term |
| Richelieu | Arthur Aimé Bruneau (until 29 January 1907 judicial appointment) | Liberal | 1892 | 4th term |
| Richelieu | Adélard Lanctôt (by-election of 1907-03-07) | Liberal | 1907 | 1st term |
| Richmond—Wolfe | Edmund William Tobin | Liberal | 1900 | 2nd term |
| Rimouski | Jean Auguste Ross | Liberal | 1897 | 3rd term |
| Rouville | **Louis Philippe Brodeur** | Liberal | 1904 | 1st term |
| St. Anne | Daniel Gallery (until election voided 12 October 1906) | Liberal | 1900 | 2nd term |
| St. Anne | Joseph Charles Walsh (by-election of 1906-11-21) | Liberal | 1906 | 1st term |
| St. Antoine | Herbert Brown Ames | Conservative | 1904 | 1st term |
| St. Hyacinthe | Aimé Majorique Beauparlant | Liberal | 1904 | 1st term |
| St. James | Honoré Hippolyte Achille Gervais | Liberal | 1904 | 1st term |
| St. Johns—Iberville | Louis Philippe Demers (until 31 August 1906 judicial appointment) | Liberal | 1900 | 2nd term |
| St. Johns—Iberville | Marie Joseph Demers (by-election of 1906-10-16) | Liberal | 1906 | 1st term |
| St. Lawrence | Robert Bickerdike | Liberal | 1900 | 2nd term |
| St. Mary | Camille Piché (until 21 July 1906 judicial appointment) | Liberal | 1904 | 1st term |
| St. Mary | Médéric Martin (by-election of 1906-11-21) | Liberal | 1906 | 1st term |
| Shefford | Charles Henry Parmelee | Liberal | 1896 | 3rd term |
| Town of Sherbrooke | Arthur Norreys Worthington (until election voided 4 December 1905) | Conservative | 1904 | 1st term |
| Town of Sherbrooke | Arthur Norreys Worthington (by-election of 1906-02-06) | Conservative | 1904 | 1st term |
| Soulanges | Augustin Bourbonnais | Liberal | 1896 | 3rd term |
| Stanstead | Henry Lovell (died 4 December 1907) | Liberal | 1900 | 2nd term |
| Stanstead | Charles Henry Lovell (by-election of 1908-01-22) | Liberal | 1907 | 1st term |
| Témiscouata | Charles Arthur Gauvreau | Liberal | 1897 | 3rd term |
| Terrebonne | Samuel Desjardins | Liberal | 1902 | 2nd term |
| Three Rivers and St. Maurice | **Jacques Bureau** (until 14 February 1907 Solicitor-General appointment) | Liberal | 1900 | 2nd term |
| Three Rivers and St. Maurice | **Jacques Bureau** (by-election of 1907-02-28) | Liberal | 1900 | 2nd term |
| Two Mountains | Joseph Arthur Calixte Éthier | Liberal | 1896 | 3rd term |
| Vaudreuil | Gustave Benjamin Boyer | Liberal | 1904 | 1st term |
| Wright | Wilfrid Laurier (until 20 January 1905 to retain seat in Quebec East) | Liberal | 1874 | 8th term |
| Wright | Emmanuel Berchmans Devlin (by-election of 1905-02-13) | Liberal | 1905 | 1st term |
| Yamaska | Oscar Gladu | Liberal | 1904 | 1st term |

=== Yukon ===
| Electoral district | Name | Party | First elected/previously elected | No. of terms |
|---|---|---|---|---|
| Yukon | Alfred Thompson | Conservative | 1904 | 1st term |

== By-elections ==
| By-election | Date | Incumbent | Party | Winner | Party | Cause | Retained |
|---|---|---|---|---|---|---|---|
| Stanstead | January 22, 1908 | Henry Lovell | Liberal | Charles Henry Lovell | Liberal | Death | Yes |
| Huron South | January 22, 1908 | Benjamin B. Gunn | Conservative | Murdo Young McLean | Liberal | Death | No |
| Nicolet | December 30, 1907 | Charles Ramsay Devlin | Liberal | Gustave-Adolphe-Narcisse Turcotte | Liberal | Resignation upon appointment to the provincial cabinet of Quebec | Yes |
| City of Ottawa | December 23, 1907 | Napoléon Antoine Belcourt | Liberal | William H. Hutchison | Liberal | Called to the Senate | Yes |
| Labelle | December 23, 1907 | Henri Bourassa | Liberal | Charles Beautron Major | Liberal | Resignation to enter provincial politics | Yes |
| York Centre | December 23, 1907 | Archibald Campbell | Liberal | Peter Douglas McLean | Liberal | Called to the Senate | Yes |
| Colchester | November 28, 1907 | Frederick Andrew Laurence | Liberal | John Stanfield | Conservative | Appointed a judge | No |
| London | October 29, 1907 | C. S. Hyman | Liberal | Thomas Beattie | Conservative | Resignation | No |
| Northumberland East | October 29, 1907 | Edward Cochrane | Conservative | Charles Lewis Owen | Conservative | Death | Yes |
| Wellington North | October 29, 1907 | Thomas Martin | Liberal | Alexander Munro Martin | Liberal | Death | Yes |
| Brockville | September 18, 1907 | Daniel Derbyshire | Liberal | George Perry Graham | Liberal | Called to the Senate | Yes |
| City and County of St. John | September 18, 1907 | Alfred Augustus Stockton | Conservative | William Pugsley | Liberal | Death | No |
| Richelieu | March 7, 1907 | Arthur-Aimé Bruneau | Liberal | Adélard Lanctôt | Liberal | Appointed a judge of the Superior Court of Quebec | Yes |
| L'Assomption | March 7, 1907 | Romuald-Charlemagne Laurier | Liberal | Ruben Charles Laurier | Liberal | Death | Yes |
| Victoria | March 5, 1907 | John Costigan | Liberal | Pius Michaud | Liberal | Called to the Senate | Yes |
| Three Rivers and St. Maurice | February 28, 1907 | Jacques Bureau | Liberal | Jacques Bureau | Liberal | Recontested upon appointment as Solicitor General | Yes |
| Nicolet | December 29, 1906 | Rodolphe Lemieux | Liberal | Charles Ramsay Devlin | Liberal | Chose to sit for Gaspé | Yes |
| St. Ann | November 21, 1906 | Daniel Gallery | Liberal | Joseph Charles Walsh | Liberal | Election declared void | Yes |
| St. Mary | November 21, 1906 | Camille Piché | Liberal | Médéric Martin | Liberal | Appointed Police Magistrate in Montreal. | Yes |
| Shelburne and Queen's | October 31, 1906 | William Stevens Fielding | Liberal | William Stevens Fielding | Liberal | Election declared void | Yes |
| Bruce North | October 30, 1906 | Leonard Thomas Bland | Liberal-Conservative | John Tolmie | Liberal | Death | No |
| Quebec County | October 23, 1906 | Charles Fitzpatrick | Liberal | Lorenzo Robitaille | Independent Liberal | Appointed Chief Justice of Canada | No |
| St. Johns—Iberville | October 16, 1906 | Louis Philippe Demers | Liberal | Marie Joseph Demers | Liberal | Appointed Puisne Judge of the Superior Court of Quebec | Yes |
| Elgin East | October 14, 1906 | Andrew B. Ingram | Liberal-Conservative | David Marshall | Conservative | Appointed Vice Chairman of the Ontario Railway and Municipal Commission | Yes |
| Renfrew North | October 9, 1906 | Peter White | Conservative | Gerald Verner White | Conservative | Death | Yes |
| Strathcona | April 5, 1906 | Peter Talbot | Liberal | Wilbert McIntyre | Liberal | Called to the Senate | Yes |
| Cape Breton North and Victoria | March 14, 1906 | Daniel Duncan McKenzie | Liberal | Alexander Charles Ross | Liberal | Appointed a judge | Yes |
| Victoria City | March 6, 1906 | George Riley | Liberal | William Templeman | Liberal | Resignation to provide a seat for Templeman | Yes |
| Maisonneuve | February 23, 1906 | Raymond Préfontaine | Liberal | Alphonse Verville | Labour | Death | No |
| Assiniboia West | February 6, 1906 | Thomas Walter Scott | Liberal | William Erskine Knowles | Liberal | Resignation to enter provincial politics in Saskatchewan | Yes |
| Saskatchewan | February 6, 1906 | John Henderson Lamont | Liberal | George Ewan McCraney | Liberal | Resignation to enter provincial politics in Saskatchewan | Yes |
| Town of Sherbrooke | February 6, 1906 | Arthur Norreys Worthington | Conservative | Arthur Norreys Worthington | Conservative | Election declared void | Yes |
| Compton | January 4, 1906 | Aylmer Byron Hunt | Liberal | Aylmer Byron Hunt | Liberal | Election declared void | Yes |
| York North | November 22, 1905 | William Mulock | Liberal | Allen Bristol Aylesworth | Liberal | Appointed a judge | Yes |
| Antigonish | November 22, 1905 | Colin McIsaac | Liberal | William Chisholm | Liberal | Appointed a Railway Commissioner | Yes |
| Lambton West | November 22, 1905 | Thomas George Johnston | Liberal | Frederick Forsyth Pardee | Liberal | Death | Yes |
| Wentworth | November 22, 1905 | E. D. Smith | Conservative | E. D. Smith | Conservative | Election declared void | Yes |
| London | June 13, 1905 | C. S. Hyman | Liberal | C. S. Hyman | Liberal | Recontested upon appointment as Minister of Public Works | Yes |
| Oxford North | June 13, 1905 | James Sutherland | Liberal | George Smith | Liberal | Death | Yes |
| Lévis | June 6, 1905 | Louis Julien Demers | Liberal | Louis Auguste Carrier | Liberal | Death | Yes |
| Edmonton | April 25, 1905 | Frank Oliver | Liberal | Frank Oliver | Liberal | Recontested upon appointment as Minister of the Interior. | Yes |
| Toronto Centre | April 11, 1905 | Edward Frederick Clarke | Conservative | Edmund James Bristol | Conservative | Death | Yes |
| Wright | February 13, 1905 | Wilfrid Laurier | Liberal | Emmanuel Berchmans Devlin | Liberal | Chose to sit for Quebec East | Yes |
| Carleton | February 4, 1905 | Edward Kidd | Conservative | Robert L. Borden | Conservative | Resignation to provide a seat for Borden | Yes |
| Quebec-Centre | January 19, 1905 | Arthur Cyrille Albert Malouin | Liberal | Arthur Lachance | Liberal | Appointed a judge of the Superior Court of Quebec | Yes |
