= George Barnard Baker =

Canadian politician (1834–1910)

The Hon. George Barnard Baker
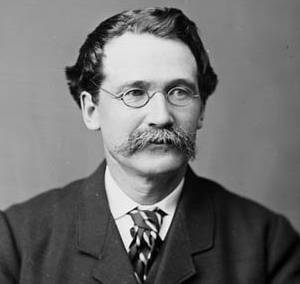

Senator for Bedford, Quebec
- In office January 7, 1896 – February 9, 1910
- Appointed by: Mackenzie Bowell
- Preceded by: Gardner Green Stevens
- Succeeded by: Rufus Henry Pope

Member of the Canadian Parliament for Missisquoi
- In office 1870–1887
- Preceded by: Brown Chamberlin
- Succeeded by: William Donahue
- In office 1891–1896
- Preceded by: William Donahue
- Succeeded by: George Clayes

MLA for Missisquoi
- In office 1875–1878
- Preceded by: Josiah Sandford Brigham
- Succeeded by: Ernest Racicot

Personal details
- Born: January 29, 1834 Dunham, Lower Canada
- Died: February 9, 1910 (aged 76)
- Party: Conservative
- Children: George Harold Baker
- Cabinet: Solicitor General (1876–1878)

George Barnard Baker (January 29, 1834 – February 9, 1910) was a Quebec lawyer and political figure. He was a Liberal-Conservative member of the House of Commons of Canada representing Missisquoi from 1870 to 1874, from 1879 to 1887 and from 1891 to 1896 and in the Legislative Assembly of Quebec from 1875 to 1878. He was named to the Senate of Canada for Bedford division in 1896 and served until his death in 1910.

He was born in Dunham, Lower Canada in 1834, the son of William Baker, and studied at Bishop's College. He articled with James O'Halloran, was called to the bar in 1860 and entered practice at Sweetsburg with O'Halloran. In 1860, he married Jane Percival Cowan. Baker was elected to the House of Commons in an 1870 by-election after Brown Chamberlin resigned his seat. He served as minister without portfolio and then solicitor general in the Quebec cabinet. He was named a Queen's Counsel in 1876.

He died in Montreal in 1910.

His son George Harold was also a member of the House of Commons.
