= Bruce West (federal electoral district) =

Ontario electoral district

Defunct federal electoral district
- Legislature: House of Commons
- District created: 1882
- District abolished: 1903
- First contested: 1882
- Last contested: 1900

Bruce West was a federal electoral district in Ontario, Canada, that was represented in the House of Commons of Canada from 1882 to 1904. This riding was created in 1882 from parts of Bruce North and Bruce South ridings.

The West Riding of the county of Bruce initially consisted of the townships of Saugeen, Bruce, Kincardine, Huron and Kinloss, the town of Kincardine, the village of Tiverton and the village of Lucknow. In 1892, it was expanded to include the village of Port Elgin.

The electoral district was abolished in 1903 when it was redistributed between Bruce North and Bruce South ridings.

== Members of Parliament ==
This riding has elected the following members of Parliament:

Parliament	Years	Member	Party
Riding created from Bruce North and Bruce South
5th	1882–1887	James Somerville	Liberal
6th	1887–1887	Edward Blake	Liberal
6th	1887–1891	James Rowand	Liberal
7th	1891–1896	James Rowand	Liberal
8th	1896–1900	John Tolmie	Liberal
9th	1900–1904	John Tolmie	Liberal
Riding dissolved into Bruce North and Bruce South

== Election results ==
1882 Canadian federal election
Party	Candidate	Votes
Liberal	James Somerville	1,833
Unknown	James H. Scott	941

1887 Canadian federal election
Party	Candidate	Votes
Liberal	Hon. Edward Blake	2,184
Conservative	James Henderson Scott	1,099

On Mr. Blake's resignation to sit for Durham West:

By-election on 19 October 1887
Party	Candidate	Votes
Liberal	James Rowand	acclaimed

1891 Canadian federal election
Party	Candidate	Votes
Liberal	James Rowand	2,015
Conservative	Hugh Morrison	1,085

1896 Canadian federal election
Party	Candidate	Votes
Liberal	John Tolmie	2,110
Unknown	Peter H. McKenzie	1,622

1900 Canadian federal election
Party	Candidate	Votes
Liberal	John Tolmie	2,147
Conservative	John George	1,513

== See also ==
- List of Canadian federal electoral districts
- Historical federal electoral districts of Canada
