= James Halliday =

James Halliday may refer to:

- James Halliday (Canadian politician) (1845–1921), represented Bruce North in the Canadian House of Commons from 1901 to 1904
- James Halliday (weightlifter) (1918–2007), British weightlifter
- James Halliday (writer) (born 1938), Australian wine critic and writer
- Jimmy Halliday (1927–2013), leader of the Scottish National Party 1956–1960
- James Halliday, a deceased character in the novel, Ready Player One
