= Philip Moore =

Philip Moore may refer to:

- Philip Moore, Baron Moore of Wolvercote (1921–2009)
- Philip Moore (organist) (born 1943), organist and Master of the Music at York Minster
- Philip F. Moore (1874–1936), Newfoundland plumber and politician
- Philip Henry Moore (1799–1880), Canadian businessman and politician
- Philip Moore (Medal of Honor) (1853–?), United States Navy sailor and recipient of the Medal of Honor
- Philip Moore (scholar), Manx clergyman and scholar

== See also ==
- Phillip Moore, American politician
- Phil Moore (disambiguation)
