= Rowand =

Rowand is a surname. Notable people with the surname include:

- Aaron Rowand (born 1977), American baseball player
- James Rowand (1830–1897), farmer and political figure
- John Rowand (c. 1787–1854), fur trader
- Robert Rowand Anderson (1834–1921), Scottish Victorian architect
