= Leonard Thomas Bland =

Canadian Liberal-Conservative politician (1851–1906)

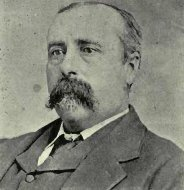

Member of the Canadian Parliament for Bruce North
- In office 1904–1906
- Preceded by: James Halliday
- Succeeded by: John Tolmie

Personal details
- Born: December 17, 1851 St. David's, Canada West
- Died: August 19, 1906 (aged 54)
- Party: Liberal-Conservative

Leonard Thomas Bland (December 17, 1851 – August 19, 1906) was a Canadian politician.

Born in St. David's, Canada West, Bland was educated at the Woodstock Literary Institute and the London Commercial College. A farmer, he was Reeve of Kincardine Township, Ontario. He was elected to the House of Commons of Canada for the electoral district of Bruce North in the general elections of 1904. A Liberal-Conservative, Bland died in August 1906.
