= Joseph Robbins Kinney =

Canadian politician (1839–1919)

MLA for Yarmouth County
- In office 1878–1882
- Preceded by: John Lovitt
- Succeeded by: Thomas Corning

MP for Yarmouth
- In office 1882–1887
- Preceded by: Frank Killam
- Succeeded by: John Lovitt

Personal details
- Born: April 15, 1839 Annapolis Royal, Nova Scotia
- Died: November 7, 1919 (aged 72) Los Angeles, California
- Party: Liberal
- Spouse(s): Ada Ritchie; Mary Dakin
- Occupation: Merchant

Joseph Robbins Kinney (April 15, 1839 – November 7, 1919) was a merchant, notary public and political figure in Nova Scotia, Canada. He represented the Yarmouth district in the House of Commons of Canada from 1882 to 1887 as a Liberal member.

The son of William Kinney (1809–1890) and Orpah Robbins, he was born in Annapolis Royal, Nova Scotia. In 1860, he married Ada E. Ritchie. Kinney was consular agent for the United States. He represented Yarmouth County in the Nova Scotia House of Assembly from 1878 to 1882. He ran unsuccessfully for reelection to the House of Commons in 1887 and 1891. Kinney was married twice: to Ada E. Ritchie in 1860 and in 1881 to Mary B. Dakin. Kinney served as Inspector of Fisheries for Nova Scotia for the division West of Halifax from 1890 to 1895. His brother, also named William Kinney (1832–1915), traveled to the Hawaiian Islands where he owned a sugar plantation. Nephew William Ansel Kinney became a lawyer, and nephew Ray Kinney (1900–1972) a popular musician.

== Electoral record ==
1882 Canadian federal election: Yarmouth
| Party | Candidate | Votes |
|---|---|---|
| Liberal | Joseph Robbins Kinney | 1,204 |
| Liberal | Frank Killam | 903 |

1887 Canadian federal election: Yarmouth
| Party | Candidate | Votes |
|---|---|---|
| Liberal | John Lovitt | 1,872 |
| Liberal | Joseph Robbins Kinney | 1,180 |
| Independent | J.K. Hatfield | 21 |

1891 Canadian federal election: Yarmouth
| Party | Candidate | Votes |
|---|---|---|
| Liberal | Thomas Barnard Flint | 1,732 |
| Liberal | Joseph Robbins Kinney | 1,157 |
