= John Lovitt =

Canadian politician (1832–1908)

The Honourable John Lovitt
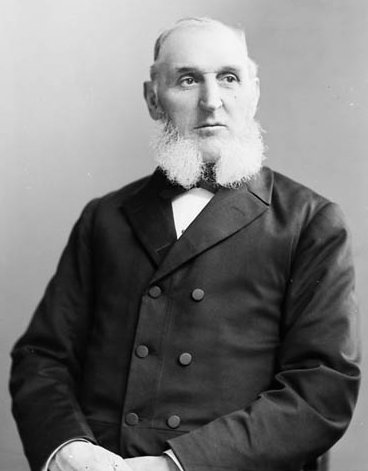

MLA for Yarmouth County
- In office 1874–1878
- Preceded by: John Ryerson
- Succeeded by: Joseph Kinney

Member of the Canadian Parliament for Yarmouth
- In office 1887–1891
- Preceded by: Joseph Kinney
- Succeeded by: Thomas Flint

Senator for Yarmouth, Nova Scotia
- In office 18 December 1896 – 13 April 1908
- Appointed by: Wilfrid Laurier

Personal details
- Born: 9 October 1832 Yarmouth, Nova Scotia
- Died: 13 April 1908 (aged 75) Yarmouth, Nova Scotia
- Party: Liberal
- Spouse: Elizabeth Guest
- Occupation: Captain, shipowner, shipbuilder, entrepreneur

John Lovitt (9 October 1832 – 13 April 1908) was a Canadian ship’s captain, shipowner, shipbuilder, entrepreneur, and politician.

== Early life and education ==
Born in Yarmouth, Nova Scotia, the eldest son of the John W. Lovitt, Lovitt was educated at the Yarmouth Academy.

== Career ==
A master mariner and shipowner, he was also a director of the Bank of Yarmouth. He represented Yarmouth as a Liberal representative in the Nova Scotia House of Assembly from 1874 to 1878. He held a seat in the House of Commons from 1887 until 1891. He was called to the Senate on the advice of Wilfrid Laurier on 29 March 1897. Sitting for the Liberal Party of Canada he served until his death in 1908.

== Personal life ==
He married Elizabeth Guest in January 1860. They had three sons and five daughters.

== Electoral record ==
1887 Canadian federal election: Yarmouth
Party	Candidate	Votes
Liberal	John Lovitt	1,872
Liberal	Joseph Robbins Kinney	1,180
Independent	J.K. Hatfield	21

By-election on 15 December 1887 On election being declared void, 13 August 1887
Party	Candidate	Votes
Liberal	John Lovitt	1,551
Independent	T.B. Crosby	980
