= William Frederic Kay =

Canadian politician

The Hon. William Frederic Kay

Member of the Canadian Parliament for Missisquoi
- In office 1911–1930
- Preceded by: Daniel Bishop Meigs
- Succeeded by: District was abolished in 1924

Personal details
- Born: May 18, 1876 Montreal, Quebec, Canada
- Died: May 8, 1942 (aged 65)
- Party: Liberal
- Cabinet: Minister Without Portfolio (1930)

William Frederic Kay, PC (May 18, 1876 – May 8, 1942) was a Canadian politician.

Born in Montreal, Quebec, he was first elected to the House of Commons of Canada representing the Quebec riding of Missisquoi in the 1911 federal election. A Liberal, he was re-elected in 1917, 1921, 1925, and 1926. In June 1930, he was appointed a Minister without Portfolio in the cabinet of MacKenzie King. He was defeated in the July 1930 federal election.
