= James Somerville (Bruce County politician) =

Canadian politician

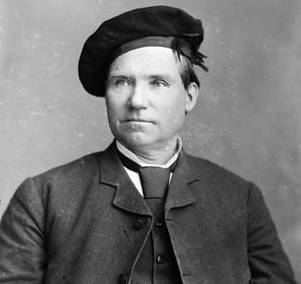
James Somerville Source: Library and Archives Canada

James Somerville (January 31, 1826 – September 19, 1898) was an Ontario businessman, notary public and political figure. He represented Bruce West in the House of Commons of Canada as a Liberal member from 1882 to 1887.

He was born in Dunfermline, Fife, Scotland in 1826 and came to Dundas, Upper Canada with his family in 1841. In 1849, he married Mary Bennett. He was named a magistrate in 1854. He founded the village of Lucknow, where he bought a sawmill and erected a gristmill and wool carding mill. He also helped organize a petition to have Lucknow incorporated as a police village in 1863 and donated the land for the town hall. Somerville also served on the township councils for Wawanosh and Kinloss and was commissioner in the Court of Queen's Bench. He was First Principal in the Royal Arch chapter of Freemasons.
