= Walter MacMorris Dack =

Canadian politician

Ontario MPP
- In office 1886–1894
- Preceded by: New riding
- Succeeded by: John Stevenson McDonald
- Constituency: Bruce Centre

Personal details
- Born: April 12, 1852 Markham, Canada West
- Died: February 26, 1912 (aged 59) Walkerton, Ontario
- Party: Liberal
- Spouse: Jeannie Sturgeon (m. 1881)
- Occupation: Newspaper editor

Walter MacMorris Dack (April 12, 1852 – February 26, 1912) was an Ontario newspaper publisher and political figure. He represented Bruce Centre in the Legislative Assembly of Ontario from 1886 to 1894 as a Liberal member.

He was born in Markham, Canada West in 1852, the son of John Walter Dack, an immigrant from Ireland. In 1881, he married Jeannie Sturgeon. Dack settled in Kincardine. He was editor and publisher of the Bruce Reporter from 1879 to 1901, when he was named Registrar of Deeds for Bruce County.

The township of Dack in Timiskaming District was named after him. He died in 1912.
