= Hugh Clark (politician) =

Canadian politician

Member of Parliament for Bruce North
- In office 1911–1921
- Preceded by: John Tolmie
- Succeeded by: James Malcolm

Ontario MPP
- In office 1902–1911
- Preceded by: Andrew Malcolm
- Succeeded by: William MacDonald
- Constituency: Bruce Centre

Personal details
- Born: May 6, 1867 Kincardine Township, Canada West
- Died: May 13, 1959 (aged 92)
- Party: Conservative
- Spouse: Katherine McKay Ross (m. 1894)
- Relations: Joe Clark, grand nephew
- Occupation: Newspaper editor

Hugh Clark (May 6, 1867 – May 13, 1959) was an educator, newspaper editor and political figure in Ontario, Canada. He represented Bruce Centre in the Legislative Assembly of Ontario from 1902 to 1911 and Bruce North from 1911 to 1921 as a Conservative.

He was born in Kincardine Township, Canada West, the son of Donald Clark and Mary McDougall, both Scottish immigrants, and was educated there. Clark taught school for several years. From 1890 to 1925, he published the Kincardine Review. In 1894, he married Katherine McKay Ross. Clark was editor for the Walkerton Herald in 1890 and managing editor for the Ottawa Citizen from 1897 to 1898. His election to the Ontario assembly in 1902 was overturned but he was elected again in the by-election which followed in 1903. Clark served as lieutenant-colonel for the Bruce militia from 1906 to 1911. He resigned his seat in the Ontario assembly in 1911 to enter federal politics. From 1917 to 1921, he was a member of the Tory-led Unionist Party. He was parliamentary secretary of Militia and Defence from 1918 to 1920. Clark was defeated when he ran for reelection as a Conservative in 1921, 1925 and 1926.

Clark was the great-uncle of former prime minister Joe Clark.
