= James Malcolm (politician) =

Canadian politician and cabinet minister

The Honourable James Malcolm
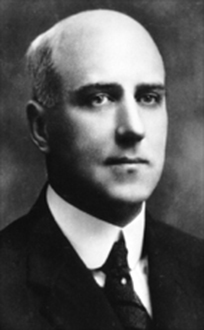

Minister of Trade and Commerce
- In office 1926–1930
- Prime Minister: William Lyon Mackenzie King
- Preceded by: James Dew Chaplin
- Succeeded by: Henry Herbert Stevens

Member of the House of Commons of Canada
- In office 1921–1935
- Preceded by: Hugh Clark
- Succeeded by: Riding abolished
- Constituency: Bruce North

Personal details
- Born: July 14, 1880 Kincardine, Ontario, Canada
- Died: December 6, 1935 (aged 55)
- Party: Liberal
- Spouse: Ethel A. Swan
- Profession: Businessman

James Malcolm, PC (14 July 1880 – 6 December 1935) was a Canadian politician and businessman. He served as the Member of Parliament for Bruce North from 1921 to 1935 and was the Minister of Trade and Commerce in the cabinet of William Lyon Mackenzie King from 1926 to 1930.

== Early life and career ==
James Malcolm was born on July 14, 1880, in Kincardine, Ontario, to Andrew Malcolm, a Member of the Legislative Assembly of Ontario, and Annie Robertson. His father owned and operated a furniture company in Kincardine. Malcolm and his brother joined the family business, and he eventually became the chairman, running the Kincardine factory.

In 1905, he married Ethel A. Swan.

== Political career ==
Malcolm was first elected to the House of Commons of Canada in the 1921 Canadian federal election, representing the Ontario riding of Bruce North. A Liberal, he was re-elected in 1925, 1926, and 1930. In 1923, he chaired a Special Committee on the Civil Service Act of Canada.

From 1926 to 1930, he served as Minister of Trade and Commerce in the cabinet of Prime Minister William Lyon Mackenzie King.

== Legacy ==
In 1928, Malcolm became the first Canadian to make a public address by trans-Atlantic telephone, delivering a speech from Ottawa to the British Empire Exhibition in Cardiff, Wales.

In 1923, Malcolm purchased a large mansion in Kincardine. The building still stands today as a retirement residence and is named 'Malcolm Place' in his honour.

== Archives ==
There is a James Malcolm fonds at Library and Archives Canada.

Political offices
Preceded by James Dew Chaplin	Minister of Trade and Commerce; 1926–1930	Succeeded by Henry Herbert Stevens
