= Phil Moore =

Phil Moore may refer to:

- Phil Moore (actor) (1961) host of the game show Nick Arcade
- Phil Moore (jazz musician) (1918–1987) pianist, orchestral arranger, and band leader

== See also ==
- Philip Moore (disambiguation)
