= Frank Killam =

Canadian politician (1843 – 1911)

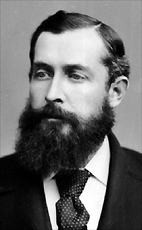

MP for Yarmouth
- In office 1869–1882
- Preceded by: Thomas Killam
- Succeeded by: Joseph Robbins Kinney

Personal details
- Born: September 3, 1843 Yarmouth, Nova Scotia
- Died: April 23, 1911 (aged 67) Yarmouth, Nova Scotia
- Party: Liberal
- Spouse: Ellen Hood
- Occupation: Merchant & shipowner

Frank Killam (September 3, 1843 – April 23, 1911) was a Canadian politician and a member of the House of Commons of Canada for the riding of Yarmouth in Nova Scotia.

== Biography ==
He was born in Yarmouth, Nova Scotia in 1843, the son of Thomas Killam and Elizabeth Gale Dudman, and was educated in Yarmouth and Sackville, New Brunswick. Killam entered business in Yarmouth. In September 1867, he married Ellen Hood. On September 21, 1867, he lost his left arm when a cannon prematurely detonated during an election celebration. The accident killed one person. Following the death of his father, he ran for his father's former seat in the 1st Canadian Parliament in a by-election held on April 20, 1869. He was elected as a member of the Liberal Party.

Like his father, he had worked as a merchant and a shipowner. He was re-elected three times before being defeated in the 1882 federal election. In 1870, he was the president of the Western Counties Railway Company.

== Electoral record ==
By-election on April 20, 1869 On Mr. Killam's death, December 15, 1868
Party	Candidate	Votes
Liberal	Frank Killam	1,220
Unknown	N.P. Clements	598

1872 Canadian federal election: Yarmouth
Party	Candidate	Votes
Liberal	Frank Killam	1,176
Unknown	William H. Townsend	440
Source: Canadian Elections Database

1874 Canadian federal election: Yarmouth
Party	Candidate	Votes
Liberal	Frank Killam	1,192
Unknown	George S.Brown	762
Source: lop.parl.ca

1878 Canadian federal election: Yarmouth
Party	Candidate	Votes
Liberal	Frank Killam	1,343
Liberal	Thomas B. Flint	802

1882 Canadian federal election: Yarmouth
Party	Candidate	Votes
Liberal	Joseph Robbins Kinney	1,204
Liberal	Frank Killam	903
