= Bruce Centre (provincial electoral district) =

Ontario electoral district

Defunct provincial electoral district
- Legislature: Legislative Assembly of Ontario
- District created: 1886
- District abolished: 1914
- First contested: 1886
- Last contested: 1911

Bruce Centre was an electoral riding in Ontario, Canada. It was created in 1886 and was abolished in 1912 before the 1914 election.

== Members of Provincial Parliament ==
Bruce Centre
Assembly	Years	Member	Party
6th	1886–1890	Walter MacMorris Dack	Liberal
7th	1890–1894	Walter MacMorris Dack	Liberal
8th	1894–1898	John Stevenson McDonald	Liberal-Patron
9th	1898–1902	Andrew Malcolm	Liberal
10th	1902–1904	Hugh Clark	Conservative
11th	1905–1908	Hugh Clark	Conservative
12th	1908–1911	Hugh Clark	Conservative
13th	1911–1914	William MacDonald	Liberal
Sourced from the Ontario Legislative Assembly
Merged into Bruce West before the 1914 election

== Election results ==
1911 Ontario general election
Party	Candidate	Votes	%	±%
Liberal	William McDonald	1,727	51.55	+6.60
Conservative	William H. McFarlane	1,623	48.45	–6.60
Total valid votes		3,350	99.76	
Total rejected ballots		8	0.24	–0.47
Turnout		3,358	78.92	–9.56
Eligible voters		4,255		
Liberal gain from Conservative		Swing		+6.60
Source: Elections Ontario

1908 Ontario general election
Party	Candidate	Votes	%	±%
Conservative	Hugh Clark	1,940	55.05	+1.58
Liberal	John J. Hunter	1,584	44.95	–1.58
Total valid votes		3,524	99.30	
Total rejected ballots		25	0.70	+0.09
Turnout		3,549	88.48	+7.69
Eligible voters		4,011		
Conservative hold		Swing		+1.58
Source: Elections Ontario

1905 Ontario general election
Party	Candidate	Votes	%	±%
Conservative	Hugh Clark	1,982	53.47	+2.91
Liberal	Andrew Malcolm	1,725	46.53	–2.91
Total valid votes		3,707	99.38	
Total rejected ballots		23	0.62	+0.62
Turnout		3,730	80.79	–
Eligible voters		4,617		
Conservative hold		Swing		+2.91
Source: Elections Ontario

Ontario provincial by-election, February 26, 1903 1902 Election Void
Party	Candidate	Votes	%	±%
Conservative	Hugh Clark	1,989	50.56	+0.49
Liberal	J.M. Stewart	1,945	49.44	–0.49
Total valid votes		3,934	100.00	
Total rejected ballots		–		
Turnout		3,934	–	–
Eligible voters				
Conservative hold		Swing		+0.49
Source: Elections Ontario

1902 Ontario general election
Party	Candidate	Votes	%	±%
Conservative	Hugh Clark	1,836	50.07	–
Liberal	J.M. Stewart	1,831	49.93	–3.44
Total valid votes		3,667	98.71	
Total rejected ballots		48	1.29	+0.80
Turnout		3,715	75.19	+6.84
Eligible voters		4,941		
Conservative gain from Liberal		Swing		–
Source: Elections Ontario

1898 Ontario general election
Party	Candidate	Votes	%	±%
Liberal	Andrew Malcolm	1,850	53.38	+11.34
Independent	John S. Mcdonald	1,616	46.62	–
Total valid votes		3,466	99.51	
Total rejected ballots		17	0.49	+0.04
Turnout		3,483	68.35	–1.56
Eligible voters		5,096		
Liberal gain from Liberal-Patrons of Industry		Swing		+5.67
Source: Elections Ontario

1894 Ontario general election
Party	Candidate	Votes	%	±%
Liberal-Patrons of Industry	John Stevenson McDonald	1,932	57.97	–
Liberal	Walter MacMorris Dack	1,401	42.03	–12.53
Total valid votes		3,333	99.55	
Total rejected ballots		15	0.45	+0.07
Turnout		3,348	69.91	+0.17
Eligible voters		4,789		
Liberal-Patrons of Industry gain from Liberal		Swing		–
Source: Elections Ontario

1890 Ontario general election
Party	Candidate	Votes	%	±%
Liberal	Walter MacMorris Dack	1,860	54.56	+4.12
Conservative Equal Rights	Alexander Shaw	1,549	45.44	–
Total valid votes		3,409	99.62	
Total rejected ballots		13	0.38	–0.22
Turnout		3,422	69.74	–1.81
Eligible voters		4,907		
Liberal hold		Swing		+2.06
Source: Elections Ontario

1886 Ontario general election
Party	Candidate	Votes	%	±%
Liberal	Walter MacMorris Dack	1,753	50.45	–
Conservative	R. Baird	1,722	49.55	–
Total valid votes		3,475	99.40	
Total rejected ballots		21	0.60	–
Turnout		3,496	71.55	–
Eligible voters		4,886		
Liberal gain from		Swing		+0.00
Source: Elections Ontario
