= Daniel Bishop Meigs =

Canadian politician

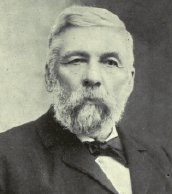

Member of the Canadian Parliament for Missisquoi
- In office 1888–1891
- Preceded by: George Clayes
- Succeeded by: George Barnard Baker
- In office 1896–1911
- Preceded by: George Barnard Baker
- Succeeded by: William Frederic Kay

Personal details
- Born: June 1, 1835 Henryville, Lower Canada
- Died: July 6, 1916 (aged 81)
- Party: Liberal

Daniel Bishop Meigs (June 1, 1835 – July 6, 1916) was a Canadian politician.

Born in Henryville, Lower Canada, his parents were both native of Swanton, Vermont, who moved in Canada in 1832. Meigs was educated in Bedford and was a farmer. He was mayor of Farnham, Quebec for several years. He was first elected to the House of Commons of Canada for the Quebec electoral district of Missisquoi in an 1888 by-election held after the death of the sitting MP, George Clayes. He was defeated in the 1891 election but was elected in 1896 election. A Liberal, he was re-elected again in the 1900, 1904, and 1908 elections. He did not stand for re-election in 1911.
