= Thomas Corning =

Canadian politician (1842–1912)

MLA for Yarmouth County
- In office 1882–1886
- Preceded by: Joseph Robbins Kinney
- Succeeded by: William Law

Personal details
- Born: April 11, 1842 Chegoggin, Nova Scotia, Canada
- Died: August 9, 1912 (aged 70) Yarmouth, Nova Scotia, Canada
- Party: Conservative
- Spouse: Jane Aldean Baxter
- Children: 3
- Occupation: Lawyer

Thomas Edgar Corning, KC (April 11, 1842 – August 9, 1912) was a lawyer and political figure in Nova Scotia, Canada. He represented Yarmouth County in the Nova Scotia House of Assembly as a Conservative member from 1882 to 1886.

He was born in Chegoggin, Yarmouth County, Nova Scotia, the son of Nelson Corning and Sarah Murphy, and was educated at Acadia College. He was called to the bar in 1869. In 1880, Corning married Jane Alden Baxter. He was named a Queen's Counsel in 1890. He served as treasurer and solicitor for Yarmouth from 1874 to 1890. From 1890 until 1912, he was recorder for the town of Yarmouth. Corning ran unsuccessfully for a seat in the House of Commons in 1900, 1902 and 1904. He died in Yarmouth at the age of 70.

1900 Canadian federal election: Yarmouth
Party	Candidate	Votes
Liberal	Thomas Barnard Flint	1,756
Conservative	Thomas Edgar Corning	1,535

By-election on 3 December 1902 On Mr. Flint being appointed Clerk of the House of Commons, 11 November 1902
Party	Candidate	Votes
Liberal	Bowman Brown Law	2,076
Conservative	Thomas Edgar Corning	1,208

1904 Canadian federal election: Yarmouth
Party	Candidate	Votes
Liberal	Bowman Brown Law	1,883
Conservative	Thomas Edgar Corning	1,524
