= Thomas Killam =

Canadian politician (1802 – 1868)

MLA for Yarmouth County
- In office 1851–1867

MP for Yarmouth
- In office 1867–1868
- Preceded by: Riding created
- Succeeded by: Frank Killam

Personal details
- Born: February 8, 1802 Yarmouth, Nova Scotia
- Died: December 15, 1868 (aged 66) Digby, Nova Scotia
- Party: Anti-Confederate, Conservative
- Spouse(s): Sophie Corning & Elizabeth Dudman
- Children: Frank, George, Elizabeth and five others
- Occupation: Shipbuilder & shipowner

Thomas Killam (February 8, 1802 – December 15, 1868) was a Nova Scotia shipbuilder and political figure. He represented Yarmouth as an Anti-Confederate member from 1867 to 1868.

== Biography ==
=== Early life ===
He was born in Yarmouth, Nova Scotia in 1802, the son of a shipbuilder there, and built his first ship, a schooner, in 1839. He built a number of ships for the fisheries and owned or part-owned about 60 ships by 1865. He was also involved in the trade of goods between North America and Britain. In 1837, Killam became a director of the Yarmouth Marine Insurance Association; he was also a director of the Bank of Yarmouth from 1863 to 1868 and of the Yarmouth Academy.

=== Political career ===
He was elected to the General Assembly of Nova Scotia for Yarmouth County in 1847 as a Reformer and served on the public accounts committee as a member and later chairman. He opposed public ownership of utilities; he was part of a private group that took over ownership of the Nova Scotia Electric Telegraph Company and opposed Joseph Howe's plans for a government-funded railway in the province. In 1851, Killam was reelected as a Reformer opposed to the Reform government's policies and, in 1855, he was elected to the assembly as a Conservative. He supported the development of municipal government in the province; Yarmouth incorporated in 1856, but then requested that its active of incorporation be repealed in 1858 because of higher taxes. He opposed railway expansion within the province and opposed Confederation.

In 1867, Killam was elected to the House of Commons; he supported the removal of Nova Scotia from the union and remain fixed in that opinion until his death in Digby in 1868.

1867 Canadian federal election: Yarmouth
| Party | Candidate | Votes |
|---|---|---|
| Anti-Confederation | Thomas Killam | 1,225 |
| Unknown | George S. Brown | 666 |
Source: Canadian Elections Database

=== Personal life ===
Killam was married twice: to Sophia Corning in 1823 and to Elizabeth Gale Dudman in 1841. His son Frank was elected to his father's seat in the House of Commons as a Liberal in an 1869 by-election.
