= Andrew Malcolm (politician) =

Canadian politician

Ontario MPP
- In office 1898–1902
- Preceded by: John Stevenson McDonald
- Succeeded by: Hugh Clark
- Constituency: Bruce Centre

Personal details
- Born: November 23, 1840 Killearn, Scotland
- Died: August 9, 1915 (aged 74) Kincardine, Ontario
- Party: Liberal
- Spouse: Annie Robertson (m. 1876)
- Relations: James Malcolm, son
- Children: 7
- Occupation: Manufacturer

Andrew Malcolm (November 23, 1840 – August 9, 1915) was a Scottish-born manufacturer and political figure in Ontario, Canada. He represented Bruce Centre in the Legislative Assembly of Ontario from 1898 to 1902 as a Liberal member. He was the father of Canadian politician and Minister of Trade and Commerce, James Malcolm.

== Early life ==
Andrew Malcolm was born on November 23, 1840, in Killearn, Scotland. He was the son of James Malcolm and Marion Duncan.

At the age of 22, in 1862, Malcolm travelled to Jamaica, working as a bookkeeper on a sugar plantation. He arrived in Monkton, Ontario, in 1867, where he found work in a general store, by way of the United States, and later moved to Blyth.

On December 6, 1876, he married Annie Robertson of Kincardine and had six sons and a daughter.

== Furniture manufacturing ==
In 1875, he moved to Kincardine, where he became a partner in a furniture business run by John Watson. The business expanded rapidly, increasing production capacity via mechanization.

In 1895, Malcolm's partner John Watson died. Malcolm's two sons Andrew Jr. and James joined the business and it became the Andrew Malcolm Furniture Company. In 1912, Malcolm took over the operation of a failed furniture factory in Listowel. James Malcolm managed the Kincardine company and Andrew Malcolm Jr. managed the Listowel Factory.

In the same year, his company won the contract to supply furniture to the hotel chain owned by the Canadian Pacific Railway beginning with the Banff Springs Hotel and the Hotel Vancouver. He also later secured a contract to supply cabinets to the Columbia Phonograph Company.

== Political life ==
Malcolm served on the town council for Kincardine, serving as reeve from 1884 to 1886 and mayor in 1904 and 1908 to 1910.

From March 1, 1898, to April 19, 1902, Malcolm represented the riding of Bruce Centre in the Legislative Assembly of Ontario as Member of Provincial Parliament. He was a member of the Liberal Party of Ontario.

During his time as MPP, Malcolm served as a member on a variety of committees including: Standing Committee on Municipal Law, Standing Committee on Agriculture and Colonization, and Standing Committee on Railways.

Malcolm was an unsuccessful candidate for the provincial assembly in 1905.

== Death ==
He died in Kincardine in 1915. He was 75 years old.

== Legacy ==
In Kincardine, ON a street is named after him; Andrew Malcolm Drive.
