= Missisquoi (federal electoral district) =

Former federal electoral district in Quebec, Canada

Quebec electoral district

Defunct federal electoral district
- Legislature: House of Commons
- District created: 1867
- District abolished: 1924
- First contested: 1867
- Last contested: 1921

Missisquoi was a federal electoral district in Quebec, Canada, that was represented in the House of Commons of Canada from 1867 to 1925.

== History ==
It was created as a riding by the British North America Act, 1867. Missisquoi consisted initially of the County of Missiquoi.

In 1892, it was defined as consisting of the parishes of St. Thomas de Foucault, St. George de Clarenceville (including the village of Clarenceville), St. Armand East (including the village of Frelighsburg), St. Armand West (including the village of Philipsburg), and St. Ignace de Stanbridge; the township of Stanbridge; the town of Bedford; the municipality of Stanbridge Station; the township of Dunham (including the villages of Dunham, Cowansville and Sweetsburg); the west part of the township of Farnham; the town of Farnham; the parish of Lacolle, together with the islands situated in the river Richelieu opposite the parish of Lacolle.

In 1903, the parish of Lacolle, together with the islands situated in the river Richelieu opposite thereto, were transferred to the electoral district of St. Johns—Iberville. The parishes of Notre Dame de Stanbridge and Notre Dame des Anges de Stanbridge were transferred from St. Johns and Iberville to Missisquoi.

It was abolished in 1924 when it was merged into Brome—Missisquoi riding.

The histories of two later Missiquoi ridings are covered in the Brome—Missisquoi article:

- Missisquoi riding was re-created in 1966 from parts of Brome—Missisquoi, Saint-Jean—Iberville—Napierville and Stanstead ridings, but was renamed "Brome—Missisquoi" in 1970.
- A third Missisquoi riding was created in 1976 from Brome—Missisquoi, but was renamed "Brome—Missiquoi" in 1983.

== Members of Parliament ==
This riding elected the following members of Parliament:

Parliament	Years	Member	Party
Missisquoi
1st	1867–1870	Brown Chamberlin	Conservative
1st	1870–1872	George Barnard Baker	Liberal–Conservative
2nd	1872–1874	George Barnard Baker	Liberal–Conservative
3rd	1874–1878	William Donahue	Liberal
4th	1878–1882	George Barnard Baker	Liberal–Conservative
5th	1882–1887	George Barnard Baker	Liberal–Conservative
6th	1887–1888	George Clayes	Liberal
6th	1888–1891	Daniel Bishop Meigs	Liberal
7th	1891–1896	George Barnard Baker	Liberal–Conservative
8th	1896–1900	Daniel Bishop Meigs	Liberal
9th	1900–1904	Daniel Bishop Meigs	Liberal
10th	1904–1908	Daniel Bishop Meigs	Liberal
11th	1908–1911	Daniel Bishop Meigs	Liberal
12th	1911–1917	William Frederic Kay	Liberal
13th	1917–1921	William Frederic Kay	Opposition (Laurier Liberals)
14th	1921–1925	William Frederic Kay	Liberal
Riding dissolved into Brome—Missisquoi

== Election results ==
1867 Canadian federal election
Party	Candidate	Votes
Conservative	Brown Chamberlin	1,190
Unknown	Philip Henry Moore	497
Eligible voters		2,915
Source: Canadian Parliamentary Guide, 1871

By-election: On Mr. Chamberlin's resignation to become Queen's Printer, 7 June 1870

By-election on 5 July 1870
Party	Candidate	Votes
Liberal–Conservative	George Barnard Baker	975
Unknown	Haskell A. Hogell	923

1872 Canadian federal election
Party	Candidate	Votes
Liberal–Conservative	George Barnard Baker	1,357
Unknown	W.F. Kay	944

1874 Canadian federal election
Party	Candidate	Votes
Liberal	William Donahue	acclaimed

1878 Canadian federal election
Party	Candidate	Votes
Liberal–Conservative	George Barnard Baker	1,355
Liberal	George Clayes	1,209

1882 Canadian federal election
Party	Candidate	Votes
Liberal–Conservative	George Barnard Baker	1,426
Liberal	George Clayes	1,273

1887 Canadian federal election
Party	Candidate	Votes
Liberal	George Clayes	1,590
Liberal–Conservative	George Barnard Baker	1,410
Conservative	A. H. Gilmour	285

By-election: On Mr. Clayes' death, 3 March 1888

By-election on 27 March 1888
Party	Candidate	Votes
Liberal	Daniel Bishop Meigs	unknown
Liberal–Conservative	George Barnard Baker	unknown

1891 Canadian federal election
Party	Candidate	Votes
Liberal–Conservative	George Barnard Baker	1,776
Liberal	Daniel Bishop Meigs	1,617

1896 Canadian federal election
Party	Candidate	Votes
Liberal	Daniel Bishop Meigs	1,687
Conservative	G. F. Slack	1,471

1900 Canadian federal election
Party	Candidate	Votes
Liberal	Daniel Bishop Meigs	1,864
Conservative	Jean-Baptiste Comeau	1,838

1904 Canadian federal election
Party	Candidate	Votes
Liberal	Daniel Bishop Meigs	1,848
Conservative	J. B. Comeau	1,714

1908 Canadian federal election
Party	Candidate	Votes
Liberal	Daniel Bishop Meigs	1,891
Conservative	Follin Horace Pickel	1,873
Independent	George Edward Ford	50

1911 Canadian federal election
Party	Candidate	Votes
Liberal	William Frederic Kay	2,002
Conservative	Follin Horace Pickel	1,800

1917 Canadian federal election
Party	Candidate	Votes
Opposition (Laurier Liberals)	William Frederic Kay	2,582
Government (Unionist)	George Provost England	1,444

1921 Canadian federal election
Party	Candidate	Votes
Liberal	William Frederic Kay	5,268
Conservative	François-Xavier-Arthur Giroux	2,740

== See also ==
- List of Canadian electoral districts
- Historical federal electoral districts of Canada
