= Yarmouth (electoral district) =

Former federal electoral district in Nova Scotia, Canada

Nova Scotia electoral district

Defunct federal electoral district
- Legislature: House of Commons
- District created: 1867
- District abolished: 1914
- First contested: 1867
- Last contested: 1911

Demographics
- Census division: Yarmouth

Yarmouth was a federal electoral district in Nova Scotia, Canada, that was represented in the House of Commons of Canada from 1867 to 1917. It was created by the British North America Act, 1867. It consisted of the County of Yarmouth. It was abolished in 1914 when it was merged into Yarmouth and Clare riding.

== Members of Parliament ==
This riding elected the following members of Parliament:

Parliament	Years	Member	Party
Yarmouth
1st	1867–1868	Thomas Killam	Anti-Confederation
1st	1869–1872	Frank Killam	Liberal
2nd	1872–1874	Frank Killam	Liberal
3rd	1874–1878	Frank Killam	Liberal
4th	1878–1882	Frank Killam	Liberal
5th	1882–1887	Joseph Robbins Kinney	Liberal
6th	1887–1887	John Lovitt	Liberal
6th	1887–1891	John Lovitt	Liberal
7th	1891–1896	Thomas Barnard Flint	Liberal
8th	1896–1900	Thomas Barnard Flint	Liberal
9th	1900–1902	Thomas Barnard Flint	Liberal
9th	1902–1904	Bowman Brown Law	Liberal
10th	1904–1908	Bowman Brown Law	Liberal
11th	1908–1911	Bowman Brown Law	Liberal
12th	1911–1917	Bowman Brown Law	Liberal
Riding dissolved into Yarmouth and Clare

== Election results ==
1867 Canadian federal election
Party	Candidate	Votes
Anti-Confederation	Thomas Killam	1,225
Unknown	George S. Brown	666
Source: Canadian Elections Database

By-election on 20 April 1869 On Mr. Killam's death, 15 December 1868
Party	Candidate	Votes
Liberal	Frank Killam	1,220
Unknown	N.P. Clements	598

1872 Canadian federal election
Party	Candidate	Votes
Liberal	Frank Killam	1,176
Unknown	William H. Townsend	440
Source: Canadian Elections Database

1874 Canadian federal election
Party	Candidate	Votes
Liberal	Frank Killam	1,192
Unknown	George S.Brown	762
Source: lop.parl.ca

1878 Canadian federal election
Party	Candidate	Votes
Liberal	Frank Killam	1,343
Liberal	Thomas B. Flint	802

1882 Canadian federal election
Party	Candidate	Votes
Liberal	Joseph Robbins Kinney	1,204
Liberal	Frank Killam	903

1887 Canadian federal election
Party	Candidate	Votes
Liberal	John Lovitt	1,872
Liberal	Joseph Robbins Kinney	1,180
Independent	J.K. Hatfield	21

By-election on 15 December 1887 On election being declared void, 13 August 1887
Party	Candidate	Votes
Liberal	John Lovitt	1,551
Independent	Thomas B. Crosby	980

1891 Canadian federal election
Party	Candidate	Votes
Liberal	Thomas Barnard Flint	1,732
Liberal	Joseph Robbins Kinney	1,157

1896 Canadian federal election
Party	Candidate	Votes
Liberal	Thomas Barnard Flint	1,640
Conservative	Jacob Bingay	1,196

1900 Canadian federal election
Party	Candidate	Votes
Liberal	Thomas Barnard Flint	1,756
Conservative	Thomas Edgar Corning	1,535

By-election on 3 December 1902 On Mr. Flint being appointed Clerk of the House of Commons, 11 November 1902
Party	Candidate	Votes
Liberal	Bowman Brown Law	2,076
Conservative	Thomas Edgar Corning	1,208

1904 Canadian federal election
Party	Candidate	Votes
Liberal	Bowman Brown Law	1,883
Conservative	Thomas Edgar Corning	1,524

1908 Canadian federal election
Party	Candidate	Votes
Liberal	Bowman Brown Law	2,285
Conservative	Samuel William Williamson	1,446

1911 Canadian federal election
Party	Candidate	Votes
Liberal	Bowman Brown Law	2,399
Conservative	Knowles Eugene Crosby	1,215

== See also ==
- List of Canadian electoral districts
- Historical federal electoral districts of Canada
