= John Stevenson McDonald =

Canadian politician (1828–1917)

Ontario MPP
- In office 1894–1898
- Preceded by: Walter MacMorris Dack
- Succeeded by: Andrew Malcolm
- Constituency: Bruce Centre

Personal details
- Born: October 31, 1828 Ayrshire, Scotland
- Died: February 15, 1917 (aged 88) Bruce County, Ontario
- Party: Liberal - Patrons of Industry
- Spouse: Jean Robinson
- Occupation: Farmer

John Stevenson McDonald (October 31, 1828 – February 15, 1917) was a Scottish-born Ontario farmer and political figure. He represented Bruce Centre in the Legislative Assembly of Ontario as a Liberal-Patrons of Industry member from 1894 to 1898.

He was born in Ayrshire, Scotland and educated at Sorn. He served on the council for Huron Township, Ontario, serving as reeve from 1888 to 1891, and was also warden for Bruce County. He also served as treasurer for the township.
