= Alexander McNeill =

Canadian politician

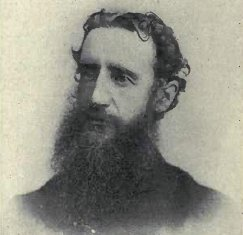

Member of the Canadian Parliament for Bruce North
- In office 1882–1901
- Preceded by: John Gillies
- Succeeded by: James Halliday

Personal details
- Born: May 10, 1842 The Corran, County Antrim, Ireland
- Died: April 18, 1932 (aged 89) Wiarton, Ontario, Canada
- Spouse: Hester
- Children: one child - Malcolm
- Profession: Lawyer

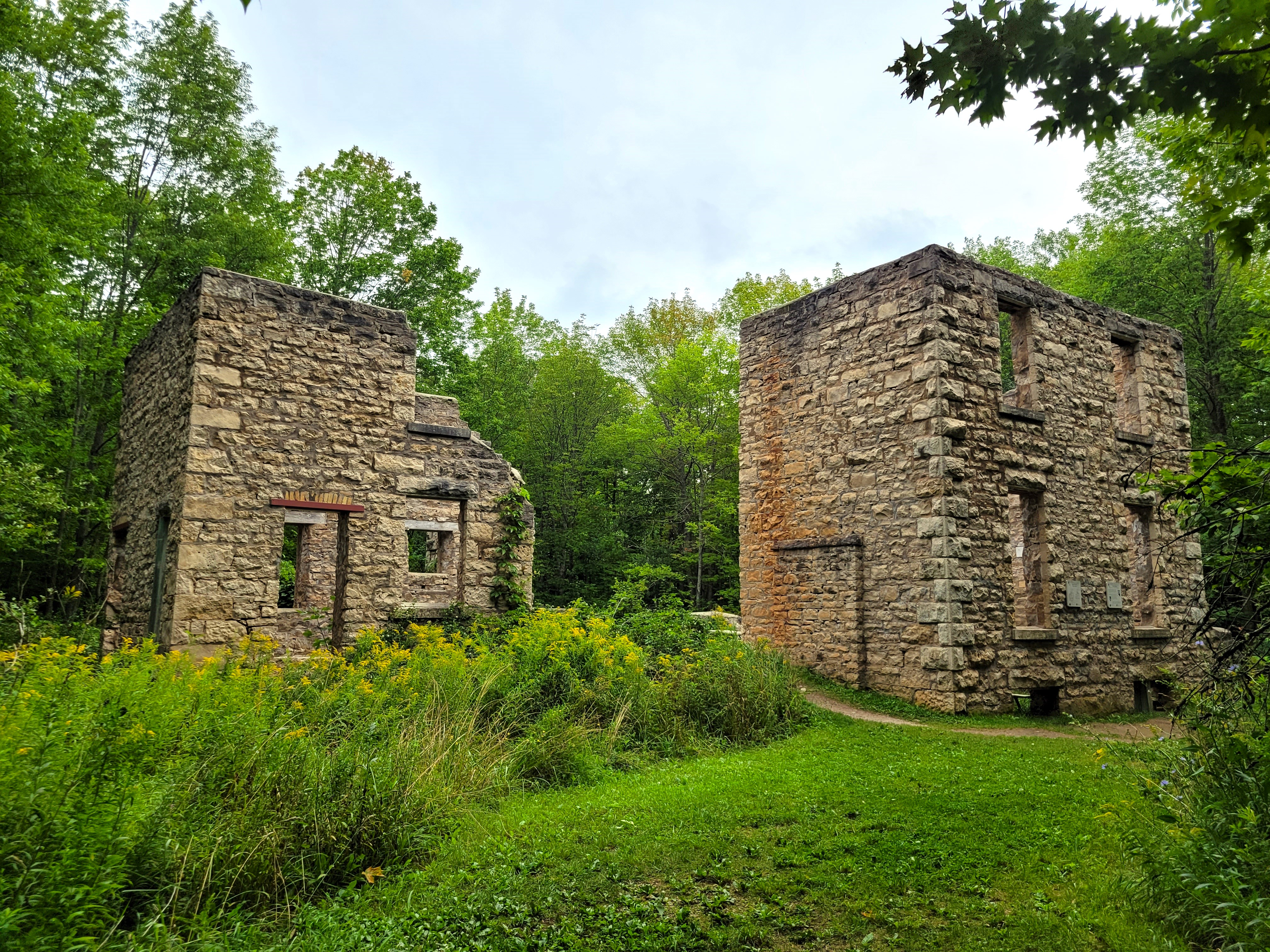
The Corran Ruins

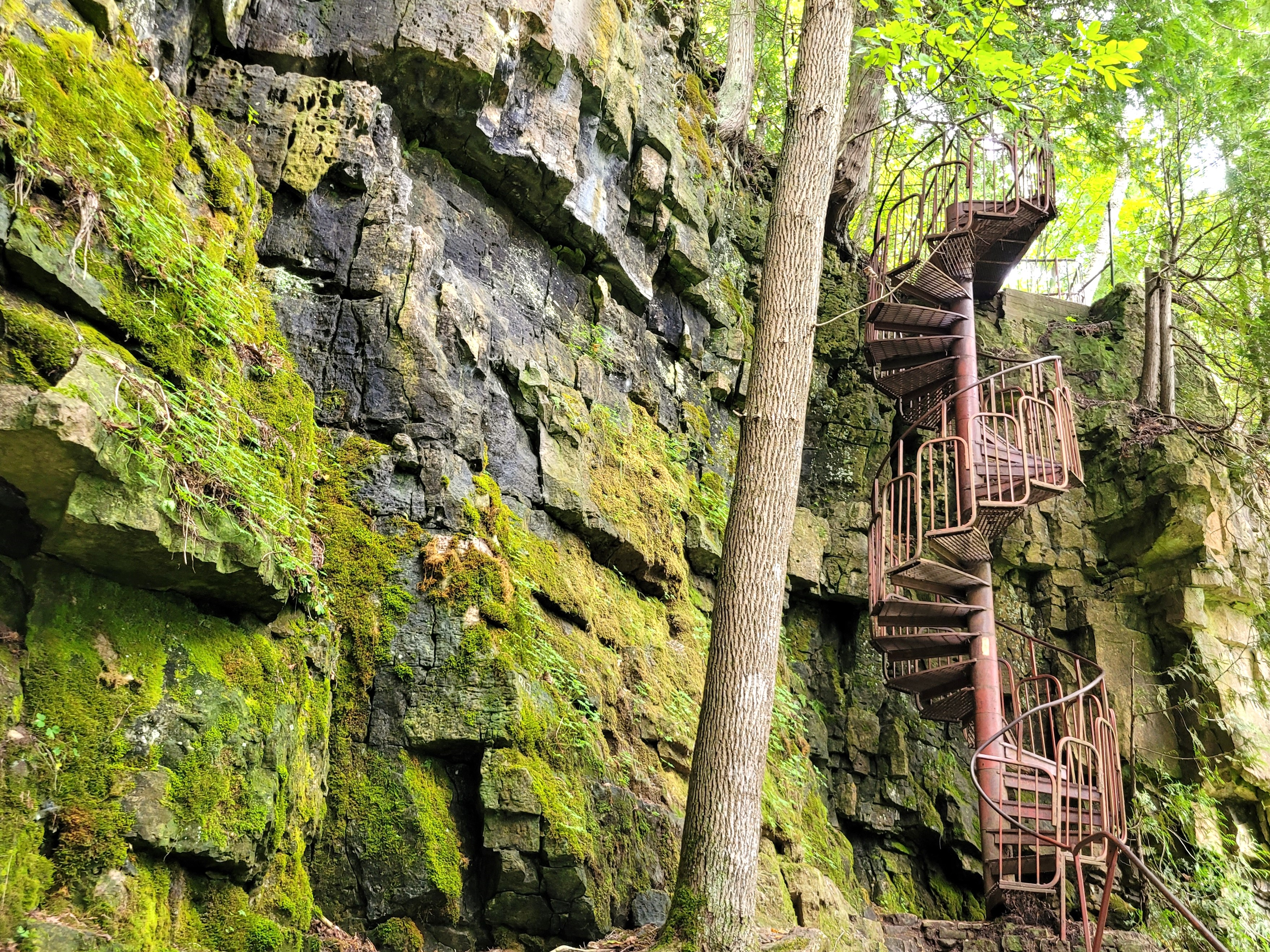
Spirit Rock Conservation Area-the Spiral Staircase from the Niagara Escarpment to the Shoreline of Colpoy's Bay

Alexander McNeill (May 10, 1842 – April 18, 1932) was a Canadian politician.

Born in The Corran, County Antrim, Ireland, the son of Malcolm McNeill, his mother was the sister of Duncan McNeill, 1st Baron Colonsay. McNeill was educated Wimbledon, Surrey, England and at Trinity College Dublin. A lawyer, he was first elected to the House of Commons of Canada for the Ontario electoral district of Bruce North in the 1882 federal election. A Liberal-Conservative, he was re-elected in 1887, 1891, 1896, and 1900. His election in 1900 was overturned in 1901 and he did not run in the by-election held later that year. He was defeated in his attempt to regain a seat in parliament in the 1908 election.

In 1872 Alexander married his recently widowed second cousin, Hester. Alexander and Hester immigrated to Canada and settled on a fram in Elderslie township, County of Bruce which had been his brother inlaws - John McNeill. From 1872 to 1881 they remained in Elderslie Township. Their only son was born in 1874, named Malcolm (Junior). Alexander McNeill purchased 300 acres north of Wiarton and called it, The Corran (which means land running into the sea - named after his birthplace in Ireland). In 1882 the extension of the rail service came to Wiarton and construction of the 17 room manor began.

In 1890, Hester McNeill died before the Corran was totally complete. Hester was the driving force behind the construction of the Corran. Alexander was devastated. Subsequently, Alexander contacted a friend in England, Alfred Lewis, and asked him to move to Canada to help him with the Corran. Alfred, his wife and 2 girls moved to the Corran where he became the manager of the estate. Three acres of gardens were designed and planted with the highlight of the gardens being 500 rose bushes and the black rose from Ireland. Many beds of peonies and 500 fruit trees were planted. Alexander also operated a successful cattle farm, "Durham Shorthorns from England" which contributed to the Canadian cattle breeding. Other buildings on the estate besides the house and barn: ice storage building, a power generating building and two cottages. One cottage was the home of Mr. Lewis and his family.

Dominion Day 1901, a long line of carriages paraded down the main street of Wiarton and up the steep hill to the great stone gates where the coachmen turned their carriages right to the Corran. People came from throughout Ontario, the rich, the politicians and gentry to spend a day amongst the roses and peonies with the music of violins filling the air.

In 1931, Alfred Lewis was killed in the first auto hit and run fatality on the Bruce Peninsula. Alexander McNeill never recovered from the shock of Alfred's death. In the following year April 18, 1932 Alexander died. The Estate was left to his son Malcolm (who never married). Malcolm, who continued to live on the property, except for the years when he fought in the Great War. Malcolm was a generous man who was left with money and a large, sprawling estate. But life was too much and Malcolm's fortune dwindled away. Malcolm sold 20 acres of land for back taxes.

In 1956, Malcolm died and the Corran was left to Sally Simmons, Malcolm's faithful housekeeper of 20 years. Sally tried to keep the house, but it was beyond her ability to keep it as Malcolm had a few outstanding debts. After closing off most of the house and living in the kitchen, she was coaxed into leaving the Corran. In 1960 the Corran was sold to a gentleman in Willowdale. But by 1964, every window, door, lightfixture was destroyed. In 1971, the Corran was purchased by Grey Sauble Conservation but vandalism and looting continued until 1976 vandals set fire to the Corran.

Today, the walls of the Corran are still standing high on the Niagara Escarpment looking down on Colpoy's Bay north of Wiarton and is known as McNeill Estate & Spirit Rock Conservation Area, owned by Grey Sauble Conservation. www.greysauble.on.ca.
