= Thomas Barnard Flint =

Canadian politician (1847–1919)

4th Clerk of the House of Commons
- In office 1902–1917
- Preceded by: Sir John George Bourinot
- Succeeded by: William Barton Northrup

Member of Parliament
- In office 1891–1902
- Preceded by: John Lovitt
- Succeeded by: Bowman Brown Law
- Constituency: Yarmouth

Personal details
- Born: April 28, 1847 Yarmouth, Nova Scotia
- Died: April 8, 1919 (aged 71) Yarmouth, Nova Scotia, Canada
- Party: Liberal
- Education: Wesleyan Academy; Harvard University
- Profession: Lawyer

Thomas Barnard Flint (April 28, 1847 – April 8, 1919) was a Canadian lawyer and political figure in Nova Scotia. He represented Yarmouth in the House of Commons of Canada from 1891 to 1902 as a Liberal member.

== Early life and education ==
He was born in Yarmouth, Nova Scotia, the son of John Flint and Anne Barnard, and was educated at the Wesleyan Academy in Sackville, New Brunswick and Harvard University. He married Mary Ella Dane.

== Career ==
He was called to the bar in 1872 and set up practice in Yarmouth. In 1874, Flint married Mary E. Dane. He was high sheriff for Yarmouth County from 1883 to 1886.

== Political career ==
Flint was assistant clerk for the Nova Scotia House of Assembly from 1887 to 1891. He ran unsuccessfully for a seat in the provincial assembly in 1873 and 1882 and ran unsuccessfully for a seat in the House of Commons in 1878. In 1902, Flint was named Clerk of the House of Commons and resigned his seat. He served in that post until 1918. He died the following year in Yarmouth at the age of 71.

He was editor of Bourinot's Parliamentary Practice and Procedure, 3rd edition, published in 1903.

1891 Canadian federal election: Yarmouth
Party	Candidate	Votes
Liberal	Thomas Barnard Flint	1,732
Liberal	Joseph Robbins Kinney	1,157

1896 Canadian federal election: Yarmouth
Party	Candidate	Votes
Liberal	Thomas Barnard Flint	1,640
Conservative	Jacob Bingay	1,196

1900 Canadian federal election: Yarmouth
Party	Candidate	Votes
Liberal	Thomas Barnard Flint	1,756
Conservative	Thomas Edgar Corning	1,535
