= Philip Henry Moore =

Philip Henry Moore (February 22, 1799 – November 21, 1880) was a businessman and political figure in Canada East.

He was born in Rhinebeck, New York, in 1799 and came with his parents to Missisquoi County in Lower Canada in 1802. He studied at an academy in St. Albans, Vermont, and became a merchant at Bedford after spending some time farming. In 1829, he was named commissioner of small causes for the seigneury of Saint-Armand and a registrar for Missisquoi County. He served in the local militia and took part of the defence of Moore's Corner (later Saint-Armand-Station) during the Lower Canada Rebellion. He was named to the Legislative Council of the Province of Canada after the Union Act of 1840 united Upper and Lower Canada. Moore chaired the commission to compensate residents of Lower Canada for losses suffered during the rebellion. He also worked at rebuilding the parliamentary library after the parliament buildings were burnt in 1849. He ran unsuccessfully as an independent Conservative candidate in Missisquoi for a seat in the House of Commons following Confederation. Moore helped establish the Montreal and Vermont Junction Railway and served as its president.

He died in Saint-Armand-Station in 1880.
