= John Tolmie =

Canadian politician

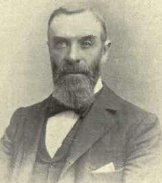

Member of the Canadian Parliament for Bruce West
- In office 1896–1904
- Preceded by: James Rowand
- Succeeded by: District was abolished in 1903

Member of the Canadian Parliament for Bruce North
- In office 1906–1911
- Preceded by: Leonard Thomas Bland
- Succeeded by: Hugh Clark

Personal details
- Born: August 30, 1845 Balgowan, Inverness-shire, Scotland
- Died: February 10, 1916 (aged 70)
- Party: Liberal

John Tolmie (August 30, 1845 – February 10, 1916) was a Canadian politician.

Born in Inverness-shire, Scotland, the son of Alexander Tolmie and Mary Fraser, he emigrated to Canada with his parents in 1868 and settled in Bruce Township, Ontario. A salt manufacturer in Kincardine, Ontario, he was Reeve of Bruce Township for four years, Deputy-Reeve of Kincardine for one year, and for two years Mayor of Kincardine. In 1883, Tolmie married Maggie H. Paterson. He was elected to the House of Commons of Canada for Bruce West in 1896. A Liberal, he was re-elected in 1900 but did not run in 1904. He was elected in a 1906 by-election for Bruce North after the death of the sitting MP and was re-elected in 1908. He was defeated in 1911. Tolmie died in Kincardine at the age of 70.
