= Brown Chamberlin =

Canadian politician

Brown Chamberlin (March 26, 1827 – July 13, 1897) was a Quebec lawyer, publisher and political figure. He was a Conservative member of the House of Commons of Canada representing Missisquoi from 1867 to 1870.

He was born in Frelighsburg, Lower Canada in 1827, the son of Brown Chamberlin, a doctor. He studied at McGill College and was called to the bar in 1850. Chamberlin worked as a journalist and was publisher of the Montreal Gazette from 1853 to 1867. He later sold the paper to Richard and Thomas White. He resigned his seat in the House of Commons when he was named Queen's Printer in Ottawa in 1870; Chamberlin held this post until 1891. He served as lieutenant-colonel in the local militia and was named a companion of the Order of St Michael and St George for his role in repelling Fenian raiders at Eccles Hill. He was also a Freemason, and a member of Civil Service Lodge No. 148, in Ottawa. Chamberlin died in Lakefield, Ontario at the age of 70.

== Family ==
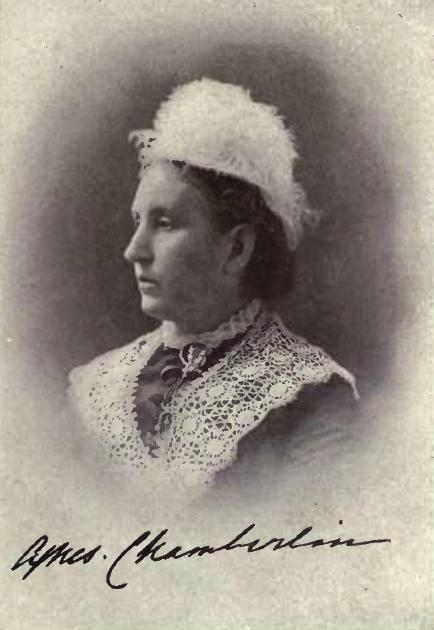
Mrs Agnes Chamberlan by William James Topley

In 1870, Brown Chamberlin married Agnes Dunbar FitzGibbon, daughter of Sheriff Moodle, of Belleville and Susanna Moodie. The couple had one daughter, Mrs. Badgley. Agnes had married her first husband, Charles FitzGibbon, Barrister-at-law, in 1850 and survived him. By her first husband Mrs. Chamberlin had one son and three daughters. Her daughter Miss Mary Agnes FitzGibbon, wrote a biography of her grandfather, Colonel James FitzGibbon, entitled "A Veteran of 1812."

Mrs. Chamberlin was an artist and the author of Canadian Wildflowers (1867) and other works. She drew on the lithographing stone the set of Canadian Fungi (edible) published by the Geological Survey of Canada. She illustrated Mrs. Traill's "Studies of Plant Life". Her drawings were exhibited at the Centennial Exhibition, Philadelphia.

== Archives ==
There is a Brown Chamberlin fonds (R3030) at Library and Archives Canada.
