= Bruce North (federal electoral district) =

Former federal electoral district in Ontario, Canada

Ontario electoral district

Defunct federal electoral district
- Legislature: House of Commons
- District created: 1867
- District abolished: 1933
- First contested: 1867
- Last contested: 1930

Bruce North was a federal electoral district in Ontario, Canada. It was represented in the House of Commons of Canada from 1867 to 1935 and was created by the British North America Act 1867, which divided the county of Bruce into two ridings: Bruce North and Bruce South.

== Geography ==
The North Riding of Bruce consisted initially of the Townships of Bury, Lindsay, Eastnor, Albemarle, Amabel, Arran, Bruce, Elderslie, and Saugeen, and the Village of Southampton.

In 1882, the riding was redefined to exclude the Townships of Bury, Bruce, and Saugeen, and include the township of St. Edmunds and the villages of Wiarton, Chesley, Tara, Paisley and Port Elgin. In 1892, it was redefined to include the Saugeen and Cape Croker Indian reserves.

In 1903, it was redefined as consisting of the townships of Albemarle, Amabel, Arran, Bruce, Eastnor, Kincardine, Lindsay, Saugeen and St. Edmunds, the towns of Kincardine and Wiarton, and the villages of Port Elgin, Southampton, Tara and Tiverton.

In 1924, it was redefined as consisting of the part of the county of Bruce lying north of and including the townships of Kincardine, Bruce, Saugeen and Arran.

The electoral district was abolished in 1933 when it was merged into Bruce riding.

== Members of Parliament ==
Parliament	Years	Member	Party
1st	1867–1872	Alexander Sproat	Conservative
2nd	1872–1874	John Gillies	Liberal
3rd	1874–1878	John Gillies	Liberal
4th	1878–1882	John Gillies	Liberal
5th	1882–1887	Alexander McNeill	Liberal–Conservative
6th	1887–1891	Alexander McNeill	Liberal–Conservative
7th	1891–1896	Alexander McNeill	Liberal–Conservative
8th	1896–1900	Alexander McNeill	Liberal–Conservative
9th	1900–1900	Alexander McNeill	Liberal–Conservative
9th	1901–1904	James Halliday	Conservative
10th	1904–1906†	Leonard Thomas Bland	Liberal–Conservative
10th	1906–1908	John Tolmie	Liberal
11th	1908–1911	John Tolmie	Liberal
12th	1911–1917	Hugh Clark	Conservative
13th	1917–1921	Hugh Clark	Government (Unionist)
14th	1921–1925	James Malcolm	Liberal
15th	1925–1926	James Malcolm	Liberal
16th	1926–1926	James Malcolm	Liberal
16th	1926–1930	James Malcolm	Liberal
17th	1930–1935	James Malcolm	Liberal
Riding dissolved into Bruce

== Election results ==
1867 Canadian federal election
Party	Candidate	Votes
Conservative	Alexander Sproat	862
Unknown	R. Douglas	852
Eligible voters		2,913
Source: Canadian Parliamentary Guide, 1871

1872 Canadian federal election
Party	Candidate	Votes
Liberal	John Gillies	974
Conservative	Alexander Sproat	951
Source: Canadian Elections Database

1874 Canadian federal election
Party	Candidate	Votes
Liberal	John Gillies	acclaimed

1878 Canadian federal election
Party	Candidate	Votes
Liberal	John Gillies	1,705
Conservative	Alexander Sproat	1,549
Source: Canadian Elections Database

1882 Canadian federal election
Party	Candidate	Votes
Liberal–Conservative	Alexander McNeill	1,250
Liberal	John Gillies	1,162

1887 Canadian federal election
Party	Candidate	Votes
Liberal–Conservative	Alexander McNeill	1,796
Liberal	Hector Alex Bonnar	1,683

1891 Canadian federal election
Party	Candidate	Votes
Liberal–Conservative	Alexander McNeill	1,862
Liberal	Hector Alex Bonnar	1,832

1896 Canadian federal election
Party	Candidate	Votes
Liberal–Conservative	Alexander McNeill	1,702
Liberal	Hector A. Bonnar	1,671
Protestant Protective	Henry T. Potts	991

1900 Canadian federal election
Party	Candidate	Votes
Liberal–Conservative	Alex McNeill	2,065
Liberal	J. E. Campbell	2,064

On Mr. McNeill's election being declared void, 2 December 1900:

By-election on 20 March 1901
Party	Candidate	Votes
Conservative	James Halliday	2,289
Liberal	James E. Campbell	2,278

1904 Canadian federal election
Party	Candidate	Votes
Liberal–Conservative	L. T. Bland	2,832
Liberal	J. E. Campbell	2,725

On Mr. Bland's death, 19 August 1906:

By-election on 30 October 1906
Party	Candidate	Votes
Liberal	John Tolmie	2,606
Conservative	A. McLelland	2,135

1908 Canadian federal election
Party	Candidate	Votes
Liberal	John Tolmie	2,774
Liberal–Conservative	Alexander McNeil	2,435

1911 Canadian federal election
Party	Candidate	Votes
Conservative	Hugh Clark	2,526
Liberal	John Tolmie	2,444

1917 Canadian federal election
Party	Candidate	Votes
Government (Unionist)	Hugh Clark	4,269
Opposition (Laurier Liberals)	John MacAulay	2,579

1921 Canadian federal election
Party	Candidate	Votes
Liberal	James Malcolm	4,178
Progressive	Richmond Earl Stacey	3,704
Conservative	Hugh Clark	2,553

1925 Canadian federal election
Party	Candidate	Votes
Liberal	James Malcolm	3,839
Conservative	Hugh Clark	3,646
Progressive	Nathan Stevenson Landon	2,351

1926 Canadian federal election
Party	Candidate	Votes
Liberal	James Malcolm	5,447
Conservative	Hugh Clark	4,959
Independent	William Smellie	53

On acceptance by James Malcolm of an office of emolument under the Crown, 22 October 1926:

By-election on 9 November 1926
Party	Candidate	Votes
Liberal	Hon. James Malcolm	acclaimed

1930 Canadian federal election
Party	Candidate	Votes
Liberal	Hon. James Malcolm	5,620
Conservative	William Mitchell	5,543

== See also ==
- List of Canadian electoral districts
- Historical federal electoral districts of Canada
