= William Donahue (Quebec politician) =

Canadian politician

William Donahue (August 12, 1834 – July 15, 1892) was a merchant and political figure in Quebec. He represented Missisquoi in the House of Commons of Canada from 1874 to 1878 as a Liberal member.

He was born in Frampton, Lower Canada, the son of Michael Donahue and Mary Murphy, Irish immigrants. Donahue was a merchant in West Farnham and Montreal. In 1882, he married Mary Ann Miller. Donahue served as a member of the municipal council for Missisquoi County. He was mayor of the village of Farnham from 1872 to 1874. He died in Farnham at the age of 57.
