= Bowman Brown Law =

Canadian politician

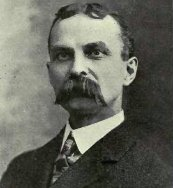

Member of the Canadian Parliament for Yarmouth
- In office December 3, 1902 – February 3, 1916
- Preceded by: Thomas Barnard Flint
- Succeeded by: The electoral district was abolished in 1914.

Personal details
- Born: July 29, 1855 Douglas, Massachusetts, US
- Died: February 3, 1916 (aged 60) Ottawa, Ontario, Canada
- Party: Liberal

Bowman Brown Law (July 29, 1855 – February 3, 1916) was a Canadian politician.

== Early life and education ==
Born in Douglas, Massachusetts, United States, the son of William and Mary Brown, the father of Irish and the mother of American descent, Law was brought to Yarmouth, Nova Scotia by his parents when he was young.

== Political career ==
A merchant, he was first elected to the House of Commons of Canada for Yarmouth in a 1902 by-election held on December 3, 1902, when the sitting MP, Thomas Barnard Flint, was appointed Clerk of the House of Commons. A Liberal, he was re-elected in 1904, 1908 and 1911.

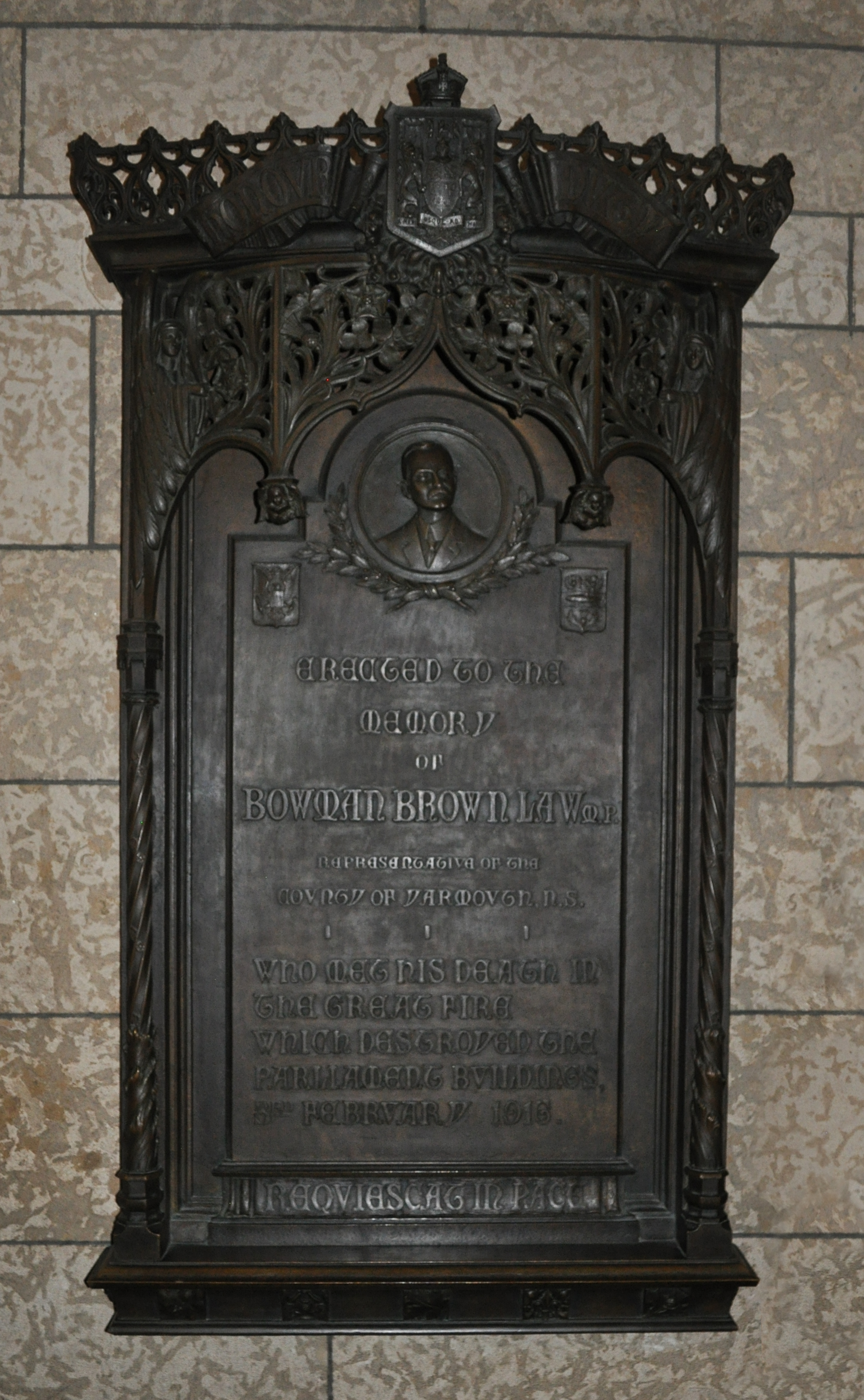
Plaque of Bowman Brown Law in hall of Parliament's Centre block. Plaque recognizes his death in the fire of the original parliament building.

== Death ==
He died in the fire that destroyed the Parliament building in Ottawa on February 3, 1916.

By-election on 3 December 1902 On Mr. Flint being appointed Clerk of the House of Commons, 11 November 1902
Party	Candidate	Votes
Liberal	Bowman Brown Law	2,076
Conservative	Thomas Edgar Corning	1,208

1904 Canadian federal election: Yarmouth
Party	Candidate	Votes
Liberal	Bowman Brown Law	1,883
Conservative	Thomas Edgar Corning	1,524

1908 Canadian federal election: Yarmouth
Party	Candidate	Votes
Liberal	Bowman Brown Law	2,285
Conservative	Samuel William Williamson	1,446

1911 Canadian federal election: Yarmouth
Party	Candidate	Votes
Liberal	Bowman Brown Law	2,399
Conservative	Knowles Eugene Crosby	1,215
