= James Rowand =

Canadian politician

James Rowand (January 23, 1830 – January 24, 1897) was a Scottish-born farmer and political figure in Ontario, Canada. He represented Bruce West in the House of Commons of Canada from 1887 to 1896 as a Liberal member.

He was born in Paisley, came to Upper Canada with his family in 1832 and was educated in Toronto. In 1854, he married Elizabeth Gowanlock. Rowand served on the council for Arran Township and was reeve in 1864 and from 1867 to 1870. In the 1887 federal election, Edward Blake had been elected in both Bruce West and Durham West; Rowand was elected in an 1887 by-election held after Blake chose to represent Durham West. He was re-elected in the 1891 federal election. Rowand did not run for re-election in 1896 and died the following year.
