= George Clayes =

Canadian politician

George Clayes (c. 1831 – March 3, 1888) was an American-born farmer, merchant and political figure in Quebec. He represented Missisquoi in the House of Commons of Canada from 1887 to 1888 as a Liberal member.

He was born in New Hampshire, the son of the Reverend Dana Clayes, and came to Bedford, Canada East with his uncle in 1846. In 1850, he went to Cleveland, Ohio, where he entered business as a merchant. He then went to Omaha, Nebraska, where he served as a member of the territorial legislature. In 1866, Clayes returned to Bedford. He married his cousin Sophia Clayes in 1855. Clayes was an unsuccessful candidate for a seat in the House of Commons in 1878 and 1882. He died in office at the age of 57.
