= James Halliday (Canadian politician) =

Canadian politician

James Halliday (April 3, 1845 – April 11, 1921) was a merchant and political figure in Ontario, Canada. He represented Bruce North in the House of Commons of Canada from 1901 to 1904 as a Conservative.

He was born in Burgess Township, Leeds County, Canada West, the son of James Halliday and Bessie Allan. In 1868, he married Katie Fisher. Halliday was also a cattle dealer. He served as a member of the council for Bruce County. He was elected to the House of Commons in a 1901 by-election held after the election of Alexander McNeill in 1900 was declared void.
