= Walkerton District Secondary School =

Location
- 1320 Yonge Street S Walkerton, Ontario; Canada; 44.1192°N 81.1456°W

Information
- Funding type: Public
- Founded: 1951
- Closed: 2012
- School board: Bluewater District School Board

Walkerton District Secondary School (WDSS) was a public high school in the town of Walkerton, Ontario, Canada. The school was replaced in 2012 when Walkerton District Secondary School, Brant Public School and Walkerton Public School amalgamated into one new K–12 school called Walkerton District Community School.

== History ==
WDSS first opened its doors on Yonge St. Walkerton on September 1, 1951. Enrolment was just over 300 students, with a staff of 13 teachers.

== New school ==
In 2008 the Bluewater District School Board released their plans for a combined K–12 school to replace Brant Central, Walkerton Public and Walkerton District Secondary schools.

In September 2012 the new Walkerton District Community School opened its doors.

== See also ==
- List of high schools in Ontario
