= Chesley, Ontario =

Chesley
- Community
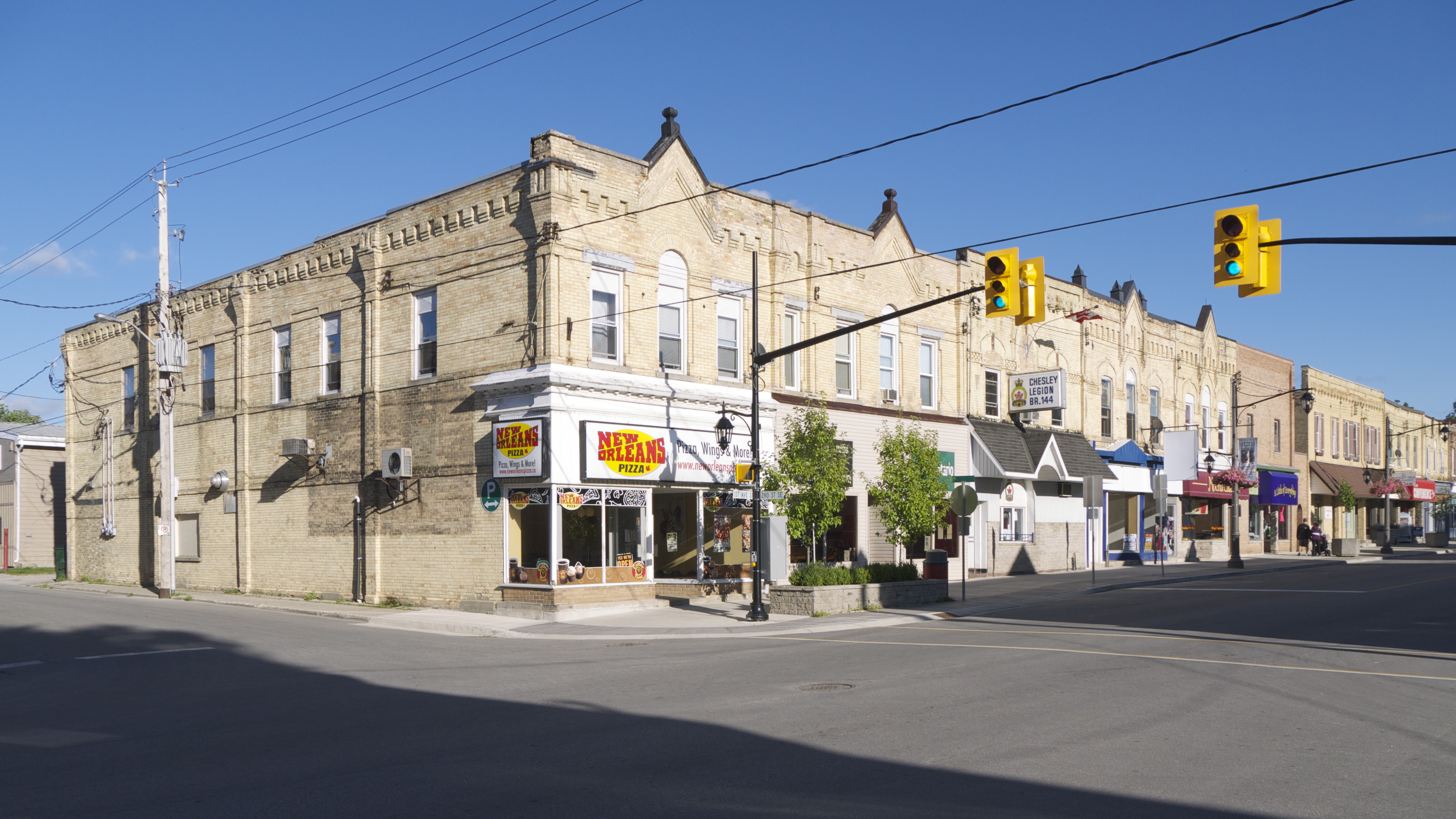
- Motto: Nicest Town Around
- Location in southern Ontario
- Coordinates: 44°18′N 81°06′W
- Country: Canada
- Province: Ontario
- County: Bruce County
- Township: Arran-Elderslie
- Founded: 1858
- Established: 1865
- Incorporated: 1879

Government
  - Mayor of Arran-Elderslie: Steve Hammell
  - MP: Alex Ruff
  - MPP: Paul Vickers
- Elevation: 300 m (980 ft)

Population
  - Total: 1,800
  - Demonym: Chesleyite
- Time zone: UTC– 05:00 (EST)
  - Summer (DST): UTC– 04:00 (EDT)
- Postal code: N0G 1L0
- Area codes: 226, 519
- Website: arran-elderslie.com

Chesley (originally Sconeville) is a community in Bruce County, Ontario, Canada, located within the municipality of Arran–Elderslie. The name Sconeville was replaced in 1868 to mark the career of Solomon Chesley, an official in the pre-Confederation Indian Department. Its town slogan is "The Nicest Town Around." Chesley is located north of both Walkerton on Bruce Road 19 and Hanover on County Road 10. It is now an example of a typical rural Ontario community.

Chesley originally developed around mills built on the Saugeen River around 1858. It expanded further when it was connected to the Grand Trunk Railway in 1881. A great fire destroyed most of the original downtown core in 1888, and the destroyed wood buildings were replaced by brick and stone.

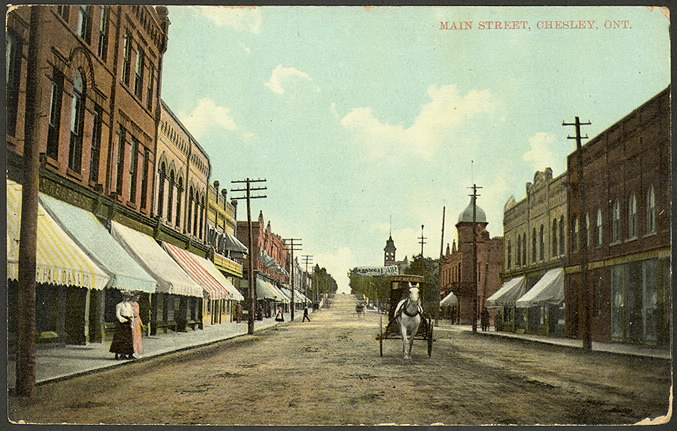
Postcard of the Main Street (now 1st Avenue) in 1910

From 1877 to 2004, the town had a weekly newspaper called The Chesley Enterprise.

The town's major source of employment is commercial manufacturing. From 1886 to 1987, the Krug family operated the Krug Bros. furniture manufacturing business. Currently Crate Designs, a locally owned furniture manufacturing factory, is the only surviving furniture factory, following the recent downsizing of Durham Furniture (2007).

Chesley is part of the Bluewater District School Board and has a junior kindergarten to grade 8 school called the Chesley District Community School. In 2014, the original Chesley District High School joined with the Kinghurst Community School to form a junior kindergarten to grade 12 facility. In 2017, the high school section closed and it is now a junior kindergarten to grade 8 facility.

The town is known for the statue of a giant steer on the north end of town, which is affectionately known as "Big Bruce."

Recently the town has begun to create a network of walking trails that encompasses much of the town's existing infrastructure of walking paths. Known as the heritage trail, it spans a large part of the town, and its waterside parks.

In 2005, Chesley was able to open a Heritage and Woodworking Museum due to an Ontario Trillium Foundation grant. The museum was housed in the Dawson House on 1st Avenue, formerly the home of town doctors Stewart and Dawson. The building had been left to the town for public use in the 1970s; in 2013, Chesley put Dawson House up for sale.

== Media ==
- Cable television is provided by Eastlink TV and Bruce Telecom
- CKNX-FM 101.7 "The One" - local, regional and national news and adult contemporary music
- CIBU-FM 94.5 "The Bull" - local, regional and national news and classic rock music

== School Bus Transportation ==
- Voyago (buses from Hanover, Ontario) (formerly Kunkel Bus Lines) (for Chesley District Community School students) (for students also bused to Hanover and Walkerton)

== Notable people ==
=== Actors ===
- Victoria Pratt (1970 – ), known for her roles of Sarge in Cleopatra 2525 and Shalimar in Mutant X

=== Athletes ===
- Paul MacDermid (1963 – ), professional ice hockey player with the Hartford Whalers, Winnipeg Jets, Washington Capitals and Quebec Nordiques
- Mickey MacKay (1894 – 1940), professional ice hockey player with the Chicago Black Hawks, Pittsburgh Pirates and Boston Bruins who was inducted into the Hockey Hall of Fame in 1952
- Charles Pletsch (1893 – 1950), professional ice hockey player with the Hamilton Tigers
- Percy Traub (1896 – 1948), professional ice hockey player with the Chicago Black Hawks and Detroit Cougars

=== Philanthropists ===
- Frank Gross (1919 – 2006), awarded the Ontario Medal for Good Citizenship in 2006

=== Politicians ===
- Reuben Baetz (1923 – 1996), member of the Legislative Assembly of Ontario from 1977 – 1987
- Solomon Yeomans Chesley (1796 – 1880), member of the Legislative Assembly of the Province of Canada from 1841 – 1844; town of Chesley is named after him
- Walt Elliot (1933 – 2020), member of the Legislative Assembly of Ontario from 1987 – 1990

=== Other ===
- Eva Shular, who operated a poolroom in Chesley, was a contestant on the July 17, 1955 episode of What’s My Line.
