= Canada Cycle & Motor Company =

Canada Cycle & Motor Company may refer to:

- CCM (ice hockey), a manufacturer of ice hockey equipment
- CCM (bicycle company), a bicycle manufacturer
