= KDSS (disambiguation) =

KDSS may refer to:

- KDSS, a radio station (92.7 FM) licensed to Ely, Nevada, United States
- Kincardine & District Secondary School in Ontario, Canada
- Kinetic Dynamic Suspension System
