= Hanover, Ontario =

Hanover
- Town (lower-tier)
- Town of Hanover
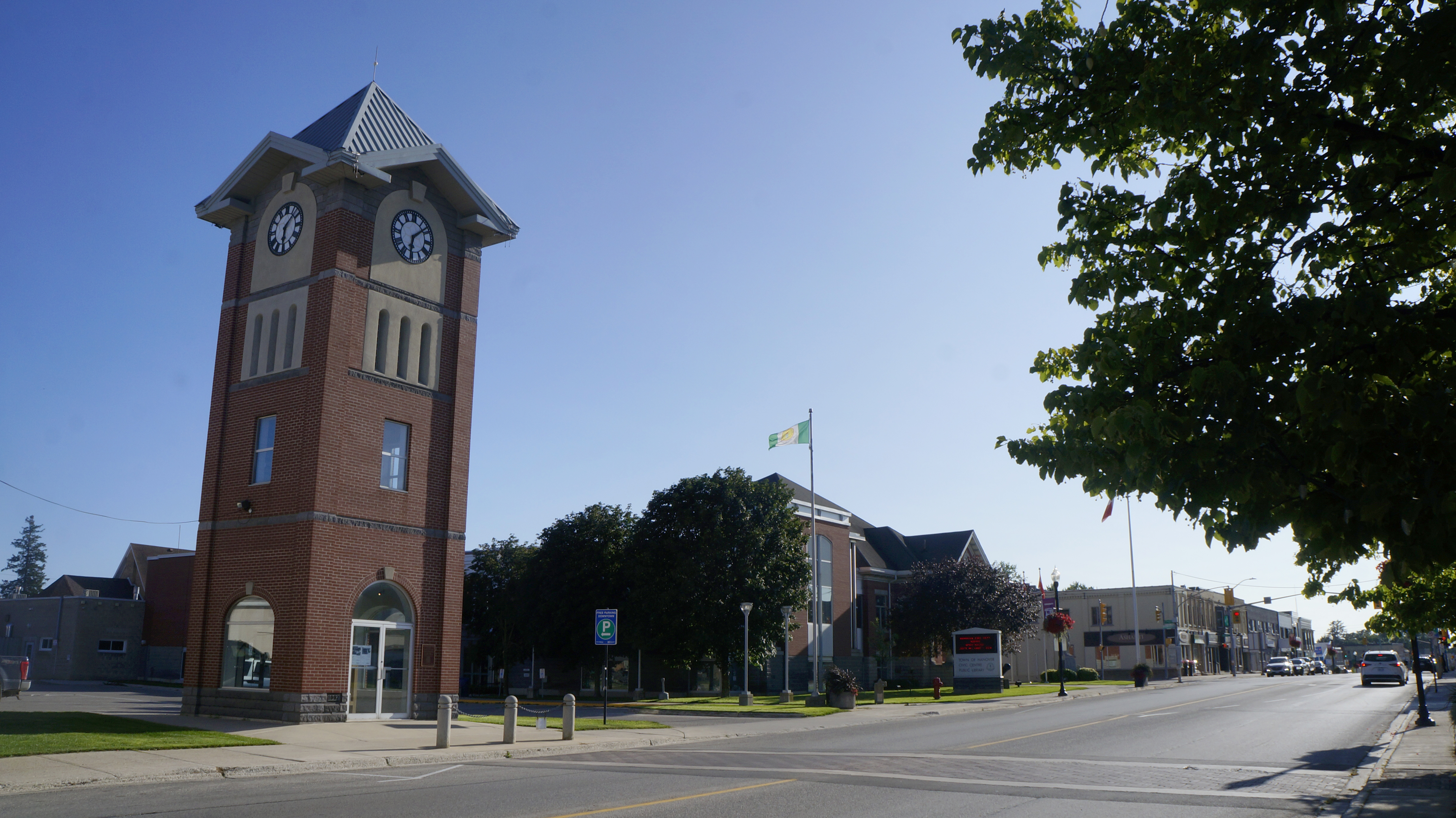
- Downtown Hanover

- Location within Grey County Location within Southern Ontario
- Coordinates: 44°09′16″N 81°01′24″W
- Country: Canada
- Province: Ontario
- County: Grey
- Settled: 1849
- Incorporated: 1904

Government
  - Mayor: Sue Paterson
  - Fed. riding: Bruce—Grey—Owen Sound
  - Prov. riding: Bruce—Grey—Owen Sound

Area (2021)
  - Land: 9.78 km^{2} (3.78 sq mi)
- Elevation: 270 m (890 ft)

Population (2021)
  - Total: 7,967
  - Density: 814.6/km^{2} (2,110/sq mi)
- Time zone: UTC-05:00 (EST)
  - Summer (DST): UTC-04:00 (EDT)
- Forward sortation area: N4N
- Area codes: 519, 226
- Website: www.hanover.ca

Hanover is a town in the Canadian province of Ontario with a population of about 7,967 residents. It is located in southwestern Grey County, bordering on Bruce County, west of Durham and east of Walkerton on Grey/Bruce Road 4. Hanover has a town hall, police department and the Hanover and District Hospital.

== History ==
In 1849, pioneer Abraham Buck and his family established a farm and tavern on the Saugeen River in the region of modern-day Hanover. Many settlers, most originally German, arrived in the area. Notable settlers included:

- Christian Hassenjager, the first of many German settlers, who was to suggest the name of Hanover;
- Abraham Z. Gottwals, a missionary with the Evangelical Church;
- Duncan Campbell, who became postmaster;
- Edward Goodeve, who had one of the first stores;
- Henry Proctor Adams, who built the dam and the first mill and drew up plans for the new village;
- Dr. Landerkin, the first doctor;
- Daniel Knechtel, who started a furniture manufacturing company that became one of the largest in Ontario.

A townsite was laid out by 1855. It was earlier called Buck's Crossing and then Adamstown, but was renamed Hanover at the same time when the post office opened in 1856. Records from 1867, indicate a gristmill, sawmill and carding mill, a foundry and a cabinet factory. Knechtel Furniture Company had opened around that time; the enterprise had been started in a barn by Daniel Knechtel, who came from Waterloo County. The company expanded over the years, becoming a large employer; it had locations in Southampton and in Walkerton and remained in operation until 1983. Other furniture companies also opened in the 1800s, including Sklar-Peppler.

The railway arrived in about 1880, a benefit to factories who now had a way to ship their goods across Canada. By the 1920s, Hanover was known as the Furniture Capital of the country. The town survived the depression and flourished after the Second World War manufacturing furniture, textiles, flour, processed food and kitchen cabinets. Manufacturing declined seriously between 1970 and 2000.

Hanover became an incorporated village in 1899 and a town in 1904. Hanover annexed part of Bentinck Township in 1967, and parts of Brant Township in 1964 and again on February 1, 1971.

== Geography ==
=== Climate ===
Climate data for Hanover Climate ID: 6113329; coordinates 44°06′59″N 81°00′21″W; elevation: 270.0 m (885.8 ft); 1981–2010 normals
Month	Jan	Feb	Mar	Apr	May	Jun	Jul	Aug	Sep	Oct	Nov	Dec	Year
Record high °C (°F)	14.0 (57.2)	16.0 (60.8)	24.0 (75.2)	30.0 (86.0)	33.0 (91.4)	35.0 (95.0)	36.0 (96.8)	37.0 (98.6)	34.0 (93.2)	28.0 (82.4)	21.0 (69.8)	19.0 (66.2)	37.0 (98.6)
Mean daily maximum °C (°F)	−2.7 (27.1)	−1.3 (29.7)	3.3 (37.9)	11.4 (52.5)	18.4 (65.1)	23.7 (74.7)	26.1 (79.0)	24.9 (76.8)	20.6 (69.1)	13.5 (56.3)	6.4 (43.5)	0.3 (32.5)	12.1 (53.8)
Daily mean °C (°F)	−6.8 (19.8)	−5.9 (21.4)	−1.7 (28.9)	5.8 (42.4)	11.9 (53.4)	17.2 (63.0)	19.6 (67.3)	18.6 (65.5)	14.6 (58.3)	8.4 (47.1)	2.6 (36.7)	−3.3 (26.1)	6.7 (44.1)
Mean daily minimum °C (°F)	−11.0 (12.2)	−10.6 (12.9)	−6.8 (19.8)	0.1 (32.2)	5.4 (41.7)	10.6 (51.1)	13.1 (55.6)	12.3 (54.1)	8.6 (47.5)	3.3 (37.9)	−1.3 (29.7)	−7.0 (19.4)	1.4 (34.5)
Record low °C (°F)	−35.6 (−32.1)	−40.0 (−40.0)	−32.5 (−26.5)	−25.6 (−14.1)	−5.6 (21.9)	−2.0 (28.4)	2.2 (36.0)	1.5 (34.7)	−5.0 (23.0)	−8.3 (17.1)	−22.0 (−7.6)	−32.5 (−26.5)	−40.0 (−40.0)
Average precipitation mm (inches)	109.6 (4.31)	81.3 (3.20)	72.0 (2.83)	73.1 (2.88)	84.6 (3.33)	78.3 (3.08)	83.1 (3.27)	95.0 (3.74)	109.1 (4.30)	89.7 (3.53)	103.0 (4.06)	108.4 (4.27)	1,087.1 (42.80)
Average rainfall mm (inches)	29.1 (1.15)	30.1 (1.19)	41.4 (1.63)	65.9 (2.59)	84.5 (3.33)	78.3 (3.08)	83.1 (3.27)	95.0 (3.74)	109.1 (4.30)	88.2 (3.47)	74.9 (2.95)	40.2 (1.58)	819.7 (32.27)
Average snowfall cm (inches)	82.6 (32.5)	51.8 (20.4)	31.5 (12.4)	7.3 (2.9)	0.0 (0.0)	0.0 (0.0)	0.0 (0.0)	0.0 (0.0)	0.0 (0.0)	1.5 (0.6)	28.9 (11.4)	67.9 (26.7)	271.3 (106.8)
Average precipitation days (≥ 0.2 mm)	18.6	15.0	13.5	13.8	13.5	12.4	10.8	12.8	14.2	16.7	16.5	17.7	175.4
Average rainy days (≥ 0.2 mm)	5	4.8	7.2	12.7	13.5	12.4	10.8	12.8	14.2	16.5	12.6	6.5	128.9
Average snowy days (≥ 0.2 cm)	14.9	11.9	7.8	2.4	0.04	0	0	0	0	0.38	4.8	12.2	54.42
Source: Environment and Climate Change Canada Canadian Climate Normals 1981–2010

== Demographics ==
In the 2021 Canadian census conducted by Statistics Canada, Hanover had a population of around 8,000 living in 3,445 of its 3,788 total private dwellings, a change of 3.6% from its 2016 population of 7,688. With a land area of 9.78 km^{2} (3.78 sq mi), it had a population density of 814.6/km^{2} (2,109.9/sq mi) in 2021.

Historical census populations – Hanover, Ontario

Year	Pop.	±%
1901	1,392	—
1911	2,342	+68.2%
1921	2,781	+18.7%
1931	3,077	+10.6%
1941	3,290	+6.9%
1951	3,533	+7.4%
1956	3,943	+11.6%

Year	Pop.	±%
1961	4,401	+11.6%
1966	4,665	+6.0%
1971	5,063	+8.5%
1976	5,796	+14.5%
1981	6,316	+9.0%
1986	6,414	+1.6%
1991	6,711	+4.6%

Year	Pop.	±%
1996	6,844	+2.0%
2001	6,869	+0.4%
2006	7,147	+4.0%
2011	7,490	+4.8%
2016	7,688	+2.6%
2021	7,962	+3.6%

Population counts are not adjusted for boundary changes.
Source: Statistics Canada: 1996, 2001, 2006, 2011, 2016, 2021 census

=== Language ===
Mother tongue (2021):

- English as first language: 94.8%
- French as first language: 0.6%
- English and French as first language: 0.1%
- Other as first language: 4.1%

=== Ethnicity ===
Panethnic groups in the Town of Hanover (2001−2021)
Panethnic group	2021		2016		2011		2006		2001	
Panethnic group	Pop.	%	Pop.	%	Pop.	%	Pop.	%	Pop.	%
European (Note: Statistic includes all persons that did not make up part of a visible minority or an indigenous identity.)	7,245	94.95%	7,065	96.38%	6,890	96.91%	6,820	97.99%	6,510	98.19%
Indigenous	140	1.83%	175	2.39%	65	0.91%	10	0.14%	35	0.53%
African	90	1.18%	20	0.27%	50	0.7%	15	0.22%	25	0.38%
South Asian	55	0.72%	25	0.34%	85	1.2%	45	0.65%	10	0.15%
East Asian (Note: Statistic includes total responses of "Chinese", "Korean", and "Japanese" under visible minority section on census.)	35	0.46%	20	0.27%	0	0%	50	0.72%	25	0.38%
Southeast Asian (Note: Statistic includes total responses of "Filipino" and "Southeast Asian" under visible minority section on census.)	30	0.39%	15	0.2%	0	0%	10	0.14%	0	0%
Latin American	15	0.2%	0	0%	0	0%	10	0.14%	0	0%
Middle Eastern (Note: Statistic includes total responses of "West Asian" and "Arab" under visible minority section on census.)	0	0%	15	0.2%	0	0%	10	0.14%	0	0%
Other/multiracial (Note: Statistic includes total responses of "Visible minority, n.i.e." and "Multiple visible minorities" under visible minority section on census.)	10	0.13%	0	0%	0	0%	0	0%	35	0.53%
Total responses	7,630	95.77%	7,330	95.34%	7,110	94.93%	6,960	97.38%	6,630	96.52%
Total population	7,967	100%	7,688	100%	7,490	100%	7,147	100%	6,869	100%
Note: Totals greater than 100% due to multiple origin responses

== Economy ==
There are many factories and farms, which are the two major employers of the residents. The annual Hanover Homecoming also provides a yearly boost to the local economy.

=== West Bros. Furniture Manufacturing ===
West Bros. Furniture is now Hanover's only furniture manufacturer, supplying bedroom, dining room, occasional and accent furniture throughout North America, and to Global Affairs Canada to furnish Canadian Embassy residences worldwide. Beginning in 1992 the West Brothers, a family of Ontario furniture manufacturers created a new company located in Hanover.

=== Dickies Canada Co. ===
Dickies Canada Co., formerly Buckeye Industries, originated in 1920 as Peerless Textiles of Toronto. The company expanded its manufacturing base in 1956 by purchasing the existing factory in Hanover. Dickies Canada produces clothing for the work wear industry with traditional matched sets of work shirts and work pants. In addition, the production lines now include jeans and casual wear. Dickies Canada Co. also merchandises a complete outerwear line. Brand names include – Dickies, Kodiak and Terra. A factory outlet has been opened in Hanover. The distribution centre / head office is located in Toronto. Dickies Canada is a wholly owned subsidiary of Williamson Dickie Manufacturing Co. of Fort Worth, Texas. Dickies Canada employs 140 local people. In December 2009, Dickies announced that it was closing their manufacturing subsidiary in Hanover, but continuing sales from the Hanover outlet.

=== Electrical Contacts Ltd. ===
Founded in 1970, Electrical Contacts Ltd. is a contact material manufacturer, servicing the needs of automobile, appliance and distribution industries. They currently export 80% of their shipments to markets in North America and Asia.

=== Hanover-Hearth Cabinets ===
Hanover-Hearth Cabinets (formerly Hanover Kitchens Inc.) was officially founded on June 18, 1952, on the same site of the previously existing two adjacent factories in Hanover. All products were manufactured in the Hanover factories and were sold in Canada, the United States and Japan. Hanover-Hearth Cabinets closed their doors December 21, 2006.

=== Hanover Racetrack Slots ===
Ontario's twelfth slots-at-racetrack operation at Hanover Raceway, opened on February 19, 2001. Since opening, the facility has averaged more than 860 patrons daily.

=== Horizon Poultry ===
Horizon Poultry has been located in Hanover since 1969. They employ approximately 750 people at their four locations, Hanover, St. Marys, Ayr and Kitchener. Hanover is the home of their hatchery and breeder farms. A division of J. M. Schneider Inc. and a division of Maple Leaf Foods, their products are distributed throughout Canada and also exported to many countries under the Schneider Foods label.

=== Leeson Canada ===
Founded in 1978 to provide the Canadian marketplace with AC and DC electric motors. Leeson Canada operates its own specialized manufacturing plant in Hanover where they produce unusual multi-speed and high-efficiency motors through 350 HP for customers throughout North America.

=== New-Life Mills Limited ===
New-Life Mills Limited is a modern automated flour mill. The original mil, Hanover Mill was, in the 1880s, run by the partnership of Horn Brothers (David Stephen and James) who had emigrated from Cambusnethan, Lanarkshire, Scotland where they, and their father, had run the Allanton Mill. It was constructed over a century ago and had a capacity to stone grind 10 t (9.8 long tons; 11 short tons) of wheat per day. The present day mill, with its two milling units, grinds over 500 t (490 long tons; 550 short tons) of wheat daily. Some of the wheat stocks are grown locally and the balance comes from the Canadian Prairies. Flour from the Hanover mill is shipped to bakers, consumers and makers of cake mixes, pasta and other fast and convenience goods. Products are shipped through the provinces of Ontario and Quebec and various countries around the world. Owned by Parrish & Heimbecker.

=== Exceldor Foods ===
P & H Foods, a division of Parrish & Heimbecker, operated a turkey processing and further processing plant. This facility has been located in Hanover since 1934 and has operated as a turkey processing plant since 1965. Exceldor Foods purchased and operates the facility as of 2014. Exceldor Foods employs 280 plus hourly people and a staff of 25 plus salaried management people. The Hanover Plant processes about 18,000,000 kg (40,000,000 lb) pounds annually and daily volumes embrace about 16,000 turkeys. "Butterball" turkey products are produced at this facility, as well as raw product being supplied to the further processing industry. Exceldor Foods exports frozen whole and part turkeys worldwide.

=== Telesat Canada ===
Telesat operates the largest of its 4,000 earth stations at Allan Park, the nerve centre of its satellite communications network. Located just outside Hanover, this facility employs over 50 staff to provide technical support for its satellites and networks.

== Points of interest ==
=== Theatres ===
The Paramount Theatre, located downtown, provides year-round entertainment with the latest movie releases. The Hanover Drive-In Theatre is located at the southeast edge of Hanover and offers summer entertainment for the entire family. Also the Hanover Drive in Theatre is one of only 23 remaining drive-in theatres in Ontario.

Hanover Civic Theatre, located downtown, attached to the Civic Centre and Library, provides live amateur and professional entertainment. The Grey Bruce Singers, Hanover Community Players and Back Porch Event Management make the theatre home. It also hosts recitals from three Hanover dance studios and various other events in its century old building that has been upgraded.

=== Hanover Public Library ===
Located in the renovated Civic Centre complex in the centre of town, the library has something for everyone, from books to computers, and space to meet, read or study. Internet connected computers and WiFi are available for use by the public. The collection includes a large number of books for all ages, videos on DVD and Blu-ray, magazines and newspapers. Online resources include large collections of free downloadable ebooks, e-audiobooks, and magazines. Audiovisual equipment is available for rent. Library services include quick and in-depth reference; a local history collection including back issues of The Hanover Post (now published as The Post) and censuses of Grey and Bruce counties on microfilm; an online obituary lookup service; pre-school programmes; a shut-in material delivery service; French language books; large print and talking books and CNIB Foundation materials for loan. The library actively participates in the Southern Ontario Library Service giving patrons access to a large selection of audiovisual materials and books through interlibrary loans.

=== Dannys Hotel ===
Dannys, also known as Danny’s Hotel and Exotic Entertainment, is an adult-entertainment venue and bar in [[Hanover, Ontario]], Canada. The business is located at 703 7th Avenue and is known for its strip-club entertainment and bar service. The establishment has been listed as an adult-entertainment business since at least the 1990s, with one business directory giving 1991 as its founding year. It has been categorized as a strip club, nightclub and adult-entertainment club in business directories.

Danny’s Hotel is one of the adult-entertainment establishments associated with Hanover and has operated as a local nightlife venue.

== Sports ==
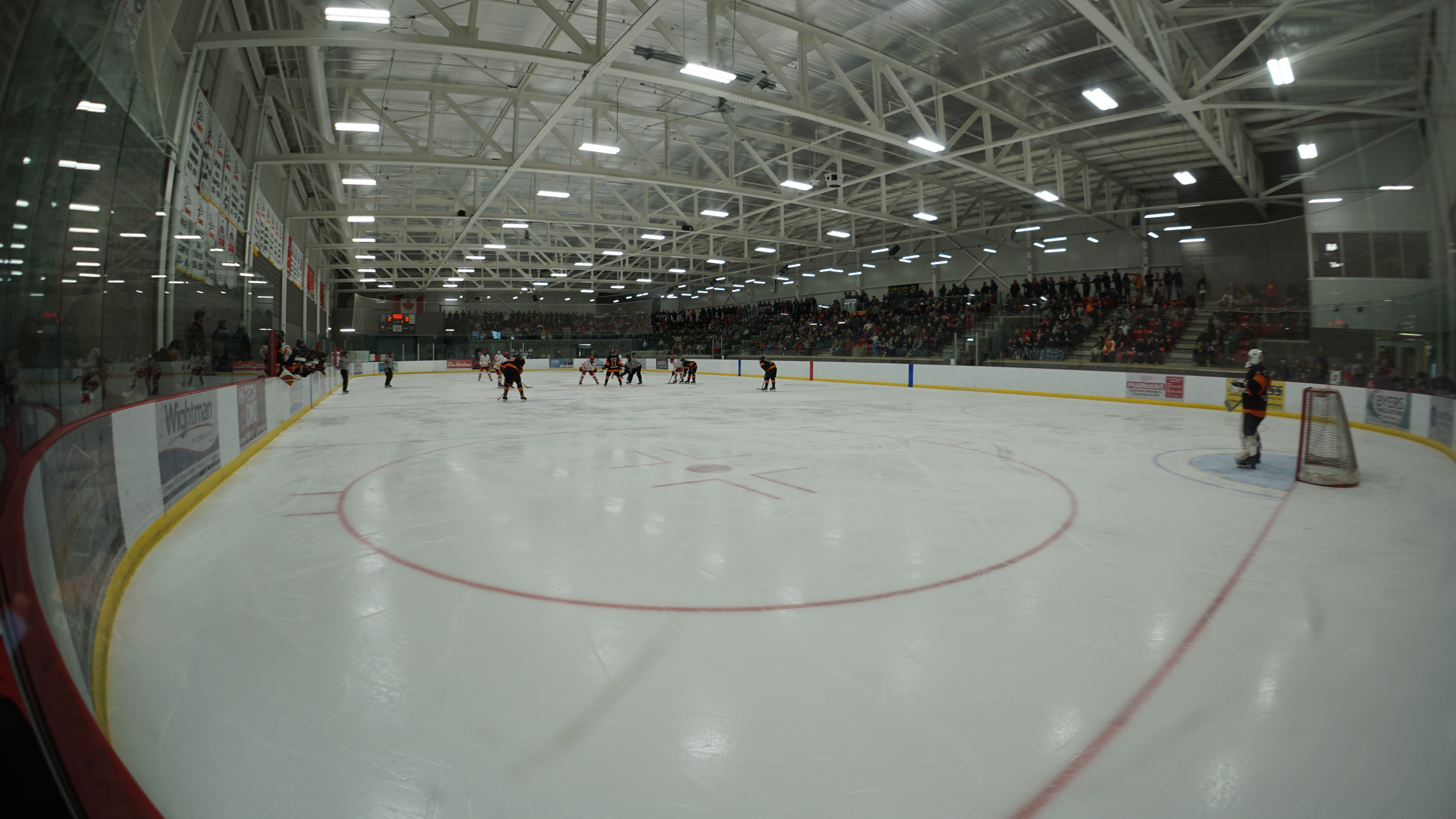
Hanover Baron's home game

Hanover is home to a Junior C hockey team, the Hanover Barons.

== Education ==
The first school was privately operated in the home of the teacher, Mrs. Campbell, on the eastern outskirts of the town (Campbell's Corner). When it became overcrowded, classes were held in the Orange Hall.

A new school was opened in 1875, just north of the main street. This structure accommodated both elementary students and those studying the first and second years of secondary. Additions were added to the structure in 1884, 1891,1895, and 1905.

Finally, in 1912, a new six-room school was built on what is the current site of Hanover Heights Community School. James A. Magee, who had become principal of the previous school in 1905, remained principal for 46 years.

The high school was built in 1924, in the southwest corner of the town, on a site known as Bartrap's Field.

Schools in the town are operated by the Bluewater District School Board, with its head office located in Chesley, and the Bruce-Grey Catholic District School Board, headquartered in Hanover.

The Bluewater District School Board operates:

- John Diefenbaker Senior School (G7-12)
- Dawnview Public School (JK-6, French immersion)
- Hanover Heights Community school (JK-6)

The Bruce-Grey Catholic District School Board operates:

- Holy Family Catholic School(JK-)8
- Sacred Heart Catholic High School (G9-12), located in Walkerton

There is also the Montessori Children's House of Hanover, a Montessori preschool, and Saugeen Academy (G7-12), a Waldorf high school.

== Local media ==
=== Print ===
The Hanover Post was the local newspaper, first established in 1880 and operated until 2005 when it was merged with three other regional newspapers to form The Post.

=== Radio ===
Hanover has its own community radio station, CFBW-FM 91.3 FM Bluewater Radio which began broadcasting in 2001.

In 1977 and 1978 the CRTC denied a license by Paul A. Webb, representing a company to be incorporated to operate an English language AM radio station in Hanover at 1360 kHz with a power of 10,000 watts day and night.

== Notable people ==
- William Brunt, Canadian senator; died in a car accident in July 1962
- Tommy Burns, one-time heavyweight world champion boxer
- Ray Edwards, retired ice hockey winger
- Larry Mercey, country music singer with the Mercey Brothers
- Carl Schaefer, painter and landscape artist
- Daryl Shane, provincial junior champion curler
- Jamie Warren, country music singer
- Eric Winkler, politician who served as Ontario cabinet minister, federal member of parliament, and mayor of Hanover
- Martin Wood, television director specializing in science fiction; best known for his work as a director and producer of the Stargate series
