= The Way Love Goes =

The Way Love Goes may refer to:

- "The Way Love Goes" (Lemar song), 2010
- "The Way Love Goes" (Brian McKnight song), 1992
- "The Way Love Goes" (Jamie Warren song), 1998
