= Sacred Heart Catholic High School (Walkerton) =

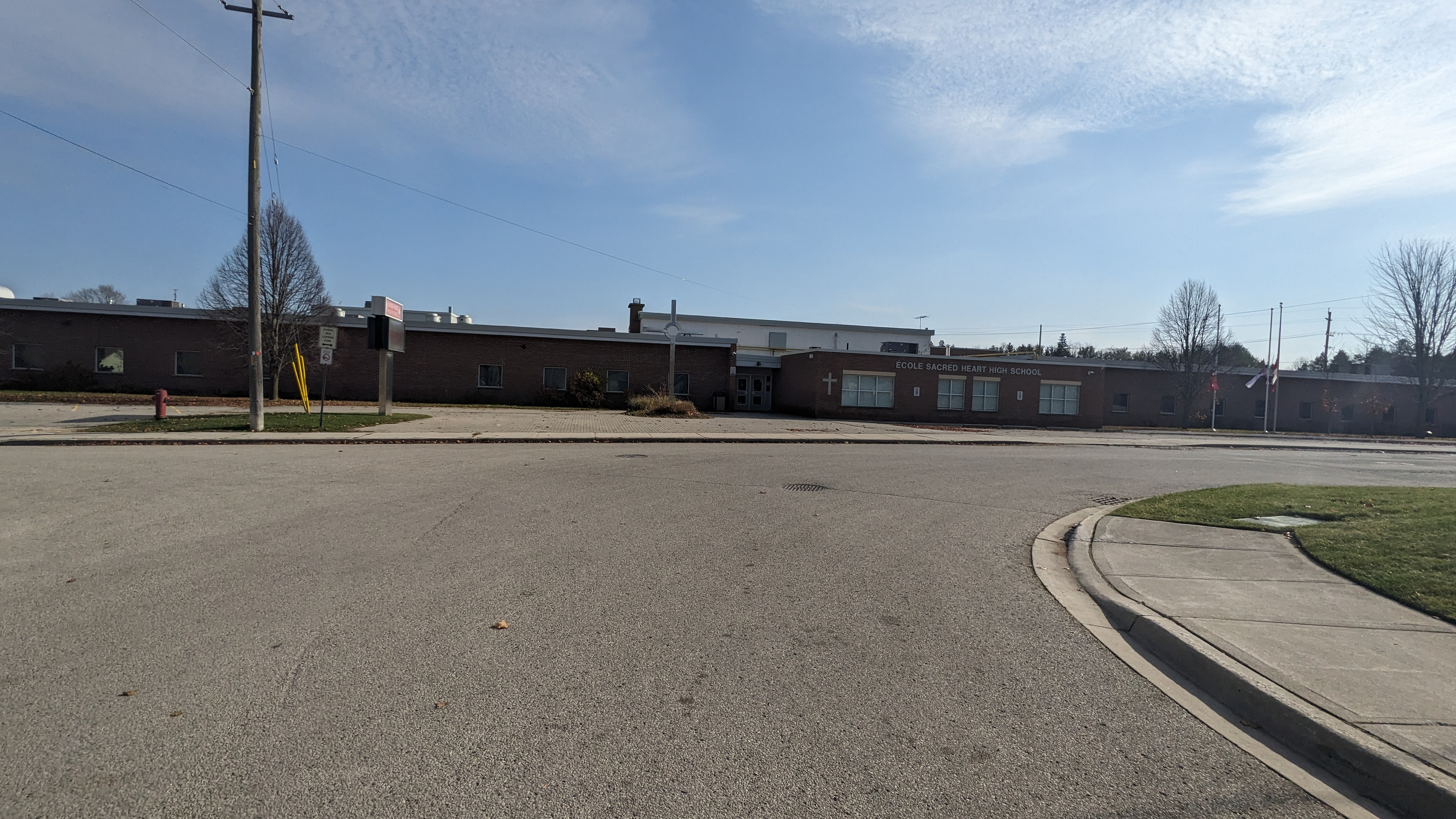

Location
- 450 Robinson Street; Walkerton, Ontario, N0G 2V0; Canada; 44.12685°N 81.14388°W

Information
- School type: High School
- Motto: Virtus et Scientia
- Religious affiliation: Roman Catholic
- School board: Bruce-Grey Catholic District School Board
- Principal: Mike Kirby
- Grades: 9–12
- Language: English
- Colours: Red and Black
- Mascot: Cosmo the Crusader
- Website: shhs.bgcdsb.org

Sacred Heart Catholic High School (also known as SHHS) is a separate high school in Walkerton, Ontario, Canada. It is located in Bruce County and administered by the Bruce-Grey Catholic District School Board. It is one of two secondary schools in the Bruce-Grey Catholic District School Board, the other being St. Mary’s High School in Owen Sound.

The school has approximately 800 students from grades 9 - 12. There are approximately 50 teaching staff members with an additional 35 support staff at the school.

The school offers a French Immersion Program as well as a Specialist High Skills Major Program. Additionally the school offers an "innovation and manufacturing centre". The school's colours are red and black, and its motto is "Virtus et Scientia," which means "Virtue and Knowledge."

== Athletics ==
The school is a member and competes in the Bluewater Athletics Association. Fall Sports:

- Basketball (Junior Girls, Senior Girls)
- Cross Country
- Baseball
- Golf
- Tennis
- Volleyball (Junior Boys, Senior Boys)

Winter Sports:

- Basketball (Junior Boys, Senior Boys)
- Curling
- Hockey
- Swimming
- Volleyball (Junior Girls, Senior Girls)

Spring Sports:

- Badminton
- Rugby
- Soccer
- Track and Field
