= John Diefenbaker Senior School =

Secondary school in Hanover, Ontario, Canada

Coordinates: 44.14785°N 81.03147°W

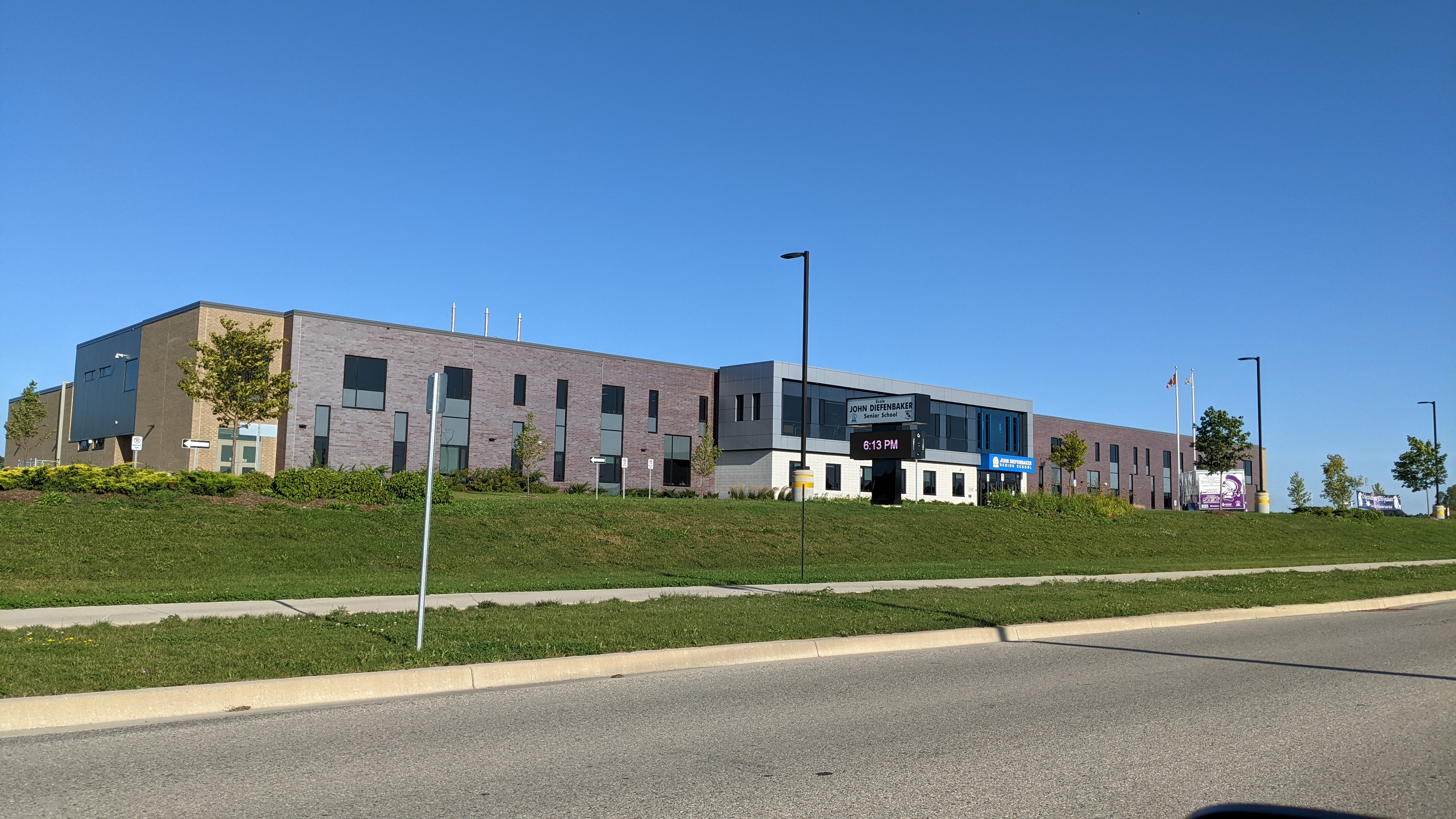

Information
- Established: 1942; 84 years ago
- School board: Bluewater District School Board
- Colors: Purple and white
- Mascot: Trojans

John Diefenbaker Senior School is a secondary school located in Hanover, Ontario, Canada. It is named after John Diefenbaker, a Prime Minister who was born in Neustadt. The school is part of the Bluewater District School Board.

== School structure ==
Mascot - Trojans

Founded in 1942

School Colours - Purple and White

== History ==
In 1985, the JDSS Trojans failed to capture the Grey County Football Championship.

In 1997, the JDSS Trojans defeated the OSCVI Falcons to capture the Grey Country Football Championship.

== Notable alumni ==
- Daryl Shane, curler
- Jamie Warren, country music singer

== See also ==
- Education in Ontario
- List of secondary schools in Ontario
