= St. Mary's High School (Ontario) =

Location
- 555 15th Street East; Owen Sound, Ontario, N4K 1X2; Canada; 44.57512425°N 80.93517°W

Information
- School type: High School
- Motto: "Adhuc Excellentior Via"
- Principal: Ms. C. Hopcraft
- Grades: 9-12
- Enrolment: 1000
- Mascot: Mustang
- Website: smhs.bgcdsb.org
- Last updated: July 1, 2026

St. Mary's High School is a secondary Catholic high school belonging to the Bruce Grey Catholic District School Board. The school serves students across Grey and Bruce counties as one of two Catholic high schools under the school boards administration. The school is ranked by the Fraser Institute as the top performing secondary school in the region.

== History ==
The original school building originates from 1891. An addition was added in 1924 to expand school capacity. The original annex was designated as a historic structure by local city council in 2008 in order to prevent its demolition. Following 3 years of debate, it was eventually decided that the building will be torn down as the building's condition had deteriorated to the point that it was a safety concern. In its place the local council ordered a 3D survey of the building, photography of the structure, and a memorial to be built in its place. The entryway of the building was preserved while the rest of the annex was demolished.

== Extracurricular activities ==
St. Mary's High School offers numerous athletic activities. Sports offered at the school include baseball, rugby, mountain biking, ice hockey, cross country running, football, golf, volleyball, and tennis. Other clubs offered at the school include a variety of music clubs, improv, guitar club, chess club, yearbook club, ceramics club, and robotics.

== See also ==
- Education in Ontario
- List of secondary schools in Ontario
