= William Brunt =

Canadian politician

William Ralph Brunt (October 24, 1902 – July 7, 1962) was a Canadian Senator and a close, personal friend and advisor of Prime Minister John Diefenbaker.

He was born in Hanover, Ontario, the son of a cattle drover and was educated locally. His final year of high school was at St. Andrews where he won the bronze medal for academic achievement. He then attended the University of Toronto and Osgoode Hall Law School where he earned his law degree in 1928. He married Helen R. Richardson from Rosetown, Saskatchewan. They had two children, Flora Elizabeth ("Tibby") and William Ralph Brunt Jr.

Brunt, a lawyer by profession, was one of the Progressive Conservative Party of Canada's chief organizers in Ontario. He was appointed to the Senate by Diefenbaker in 1957, shortly after the Conservatives took power, and was deputy Government Leader in the Senate at the time of his death in a car crash.

He and Diefenbaker had been friends for decades and Brunt had backed Diefenbaker in his unsuccessful bids for the leadership of the party in 1942 and 1948 as well as his successful drive at the 1956 Progressive Conservative leadership convention. Brunt was one of a small circle of friends who spent election night in 1957 with Diefenbaker in his private railway car and had been at Diefenbaker's side throughout the 1957 election campaign and was also a senior advisor to Diefenbaker during the 1958 election campaign that produced the largest majority government in Canadian history.
