= CFBW-FM =

Community Radio Station in Walkerton, Ontario

Coordinates: 44°08′31″N 81°01′47″W

- Hanover, Ontario; Canada
- Broadcast area: Hanover and Walkerton
- Frequency: 91.3 MHz
- Branding: 91.3 FM Bluewater Radio

Programming
- Format: community radio

Ownership
- Owner: Bluewater Radio

History
- First air date: December 31, 2001

Technical information
- Class: A1
- ERP: 250 watts
- HAAT: 39.8 metres (131 ft)

Links
- Webcast: Listen Live
- Website: www.bluewaterradio.ca

CFBW-FM is a community radio station broadcasting at 91.3 FM in Walkerton, Ontario, Canada.

The station was originally granted a three-year developmental community radio license, and began broadcasting at 91.3 MHz (channel 217LP), with an effective radiated power of 5 watts on December 31, 2001. It was subsequently granted a permanent license in 2005 at 91.3 MHz (channel 217A1) with 250 watts. From 2001 - 2024 Bluewater Radio was located on 10th Street Hanover.

On July 8, 2003, the CRTC approved Bluewater's application to change the authorized contours of CFBW-FM Hanover by relocating the transmitter to the Hanover and District Hospital site, approximately 750 metres south of the existing site. CFBW-FM's transmitter was relocated again in 2008 this time 8 kilometers to the west of Hanover.

In January 2024, the station relocated its office and studios to a larger new state of the art broadcasting facility located at 15 Victoria Street North in downtown Walkerton.

== Presenters ==
Andy Mack - The Sounds of Scotland Show. (Internationally Syndicated) Gary Smith - The Afternoon Show Monday & Wednesday, Joel Axler - Friday Night Oldies, Ian Wilson - The Breakfast Show + Crooners & All That Jazz, The Yorkshire Lass, Roz's Rockin Country, The Abyss with Bo Louther, Bluewater Bluegrass with The Axeman, The Gospel Show with John Calvert,
