= San Angelo Saints =

Ice hockey team

The San Angelo Saints are a defunct professional ice hockey team that was based in San Angelo, Texas. Originally named the San Angelo Outlaws before being renamed "Saints" prior to the 2002–03 season, the team played three seasons in the Central Hockey League, from 2002 to 2005. The team was coached by Brent Scott in the franchise's first two seasons in the CHL when it missed making the playoffs, and was coached by Ray Edwards the following two seasons, losing in the first round of the playoffs each time.

During the franchise's four years in the CHL, they had an average attendance of less than 2,400 to their games.

== Season-by-season record ==
Season	GP	W	L	OTL	Pts	GF	GA	Finish	Playoffs
2002–03	64	20	37	7	47	196	272	4th, Southeast	Did not qualify
2003–04	64	37	19	8	82	197	169	1st, Southwest	Lost in 1st round
2004–05	60	32	22	6	70	169	177	3rd, Southwest	Lost in 1st round

== Records ==
Note: this only includes CHL games

- Games: Matt Frick 183
- Goals: Trevor Weisgerber 56
- Assists: Matt Frick 78
- Points: Trevor Weidgerber 131
- PIM: Kori Davison 380
