= Bruce-Grey Catholic District School Board =

School Board in Ontario

Location
- 799 16th Ave; Hanover, ON; N4N 3A1 Canada

District information
- Chair of the board: Lori Dicastri
- Schools: 11 elementary 2 secondary
- District ID: B67008

Other information
- Elected trustees: 6
- Student trustees: Olivia Hiehn (SMHS), Tristan Kim (SHHS)
- Website: www.bgcdsb.org

The Bruce-Grey Catholic District School Board (BGCDSB, known as English-language Separate District School Board No. 35 prior to 1999) is a separate school board in the province of Ontario which manages Catholic elementary and secondary schools located in Bruce and Grey Counties, including the Owen Sound area.

== Schools governed by BGCDSB ==
=== Secondary schools ===
- St. Mary's High School, Owen Sound
- Sacred Heart High School, Walkerton

=== Elementary schools ===
- Holy Family School, Hanover
- Immaculate Conception School, Formosa
- Mary Immaculate School, Chepstow
- Mother Teresa School, Walkerton
- Notre Dame School, Owen Sound
- St. Anthony's School, Kincardine
- St. Basil's School, Owen Sound
- St. Joseph's School, Port Elgin
- St. Peter & St. Paul's School, Durham
- Sacred Heart School, Mildmay
- Sacred Heart School, Teeswater

== Other School Boards in the area ==
- Bluewater District School Board
- Simcoe County District School Board
- Simcoe Muskoka Catholic District School Board

== See also ==
- List of school districts in Ontario
- List of high schools in Ontario
