= Cried All the Way Home =

Single by Jamie Warren

from the album Just Not the Same
- Released: 1998
- Genre: Country
- Length: 3:40
- Label: TooHip
- Songwriters: Jamie Warren; Naoise Sheridan
- Producer: J. Richard Hutt

Jamie Warren singles chronology
"The Secret" (1997)	"Cried All the Way Home" (1998)	"The Way Love Goes" (1998)

"Cried All the Way Home" is a song recorded by Canadian country music artist Jamie Warren. It was released in 1998 as the first single from his second studio album, Just Not the Same. It peaked at number 7 on the RPM Country Tracks chart in July 1998.

== Chart performance ==
Chart (1998)	Peak position
Canada Country Singles (RPM)	7

=== Year-end charts ===
Chart (1998)	Position
Canada Country Tracks (RPM)	44
