= Madonna Tassi =

- Born: Newfoundland and Labrador, Canada
- Occupation: Vocalist
- Formerly of: Hagerty Family
- Website: www.madonnatassi.com

Madonna Tassi is a Canadian vocalist.

Her first album with IMMI Records of Knoxville, Tennessee, the 13-cut Man Of My Dreams, was released April 26, 2005.

"My Mother" is the album's lead single, which she co-wrote with her regular producer, Antonio Pulsone. It was produced by award-winning record producer Norro Wilson.

== Background ==
Born and raised in Newfoundland and Labrador, Tassi, and the youngest in a family of 15 children, has been performing publicly since she was five, beginning as a member of the Hagerty Family group. She fronted her own band when she was 13. She later moved to Ontario and became prominent as a jingle singer in Toronto's thriving commercial music scene. Her first nationally broadcast single was "My Heart's An Open Invitation."

== Discography ==
=== Albums ===
Title	Details
Man of My Dreams	Release date: April 26, 2005; Label: IMMI Records

=== Singles ===
Year	Single	Peak chart positions		Album
Year	Single	CAN AC	CAN Country	Album
1984	"We Care About Us" (with Jamie Warren)	—	34	singles only
1984	"Needing a Night Like This"	21	—	singles only
1985	"You Can Break My Heart Anytime"	11	—	singles only
1987	"Forever After"	25	—	singles only
2005	"My Mother"	—	—	Man of My Dreams
2005	"Two Can Play"	—	—	Man of My Dreams
"—" denotes releases that did not chart
