= Rocky Mountain Bicycles =

Canadian bicycle manufacturer

Rocky Mountain
- Company type: Private
- Industry: Bicycles
- Founded: 1981
- Headquarters: North Vancouver, British Columbia, Canada and Saint-Georges, Quebec, Canada
- Products: Bicycles
- Parent: Chaos Sports Inc.
- Website: www.bikes.com

Rocky Mountain is a Canadian bicycle manufacturer based in North Vancouver, British Columbia. Its name is a reference to the mountain range that stretches from eastern British Columbia to the southwest United States.

== History ==
Rocky Mountain Bicycles had its beginnings in the basement of a Vancouver bike store called West Point Cycles. It was in 1978 when two men began modifying Nishiki road bikes by adding wider tires, straight handlebars and internal five-speed gears. Their aim was to create a bicycle that could be ridden and raced on the technical trails of the West Coast. Rocky Mountain Bicycles Ltd. was officially incorporated in 1981, with Grayson Bain serving as president until 1997. In 1982, working with frame designer Tom Ritchey, the company introduced its first production mountain bike - the "Sherpa".

Quoted from the Mountain bike hall of fame entry, written by Jacob Heilbron "Rocky Mountain Bicycles opened a frame building facility in 1984, with lugged road and mountain frames built by English expatriate Derek Bailey. Paul Brodie, an artist and motorcycle head began by painting, then bronze welding the mountain bike frames in 1985, when Rocky Mountain Bicycles began producing and supplying their own brand mountain and road bikes across Canada. The Vancouver trademark sloping top tube was initiated in the same year when Paul Brodie built the first Rocky Mountain “Avalanche” frame for Jacob Heilbron. Pippin Osborne was frame designer and Dan Gerhard was the national sales manager of Rocky Mountain during these early years."

Having expanded sales beyond Vancouver in 1984, Rocky Mountain began shipping bikes internationally in 1989. The company expanded during the 1990s, enlarging its production facilities to meet growing demand in the United States and elsewhere. Rocky Mountain was acquired by Procycle Group (owners of the CCM and Miele brands) in 1997. Procycle then changed its name to Rocky Mountain in 2019.

Rocky Mountain Bicycles has won Mountain Bike Magazine's 'Mountain Bike of the Year' award three times - for the Hammer Race in 1996, the Element Race in 2000, and the Slayer in 2002. Rocky Mountain has also seen one of its sponsored riders, Marie-Hélène Prémont, win a silver Olympic medal in 2004.

On December 19, 2024, Rocky Mountain announced it will be restructuring to avoid bankruptcy. In 2025, it was acquired by investors Chaos Sports Inc.

== Products ==
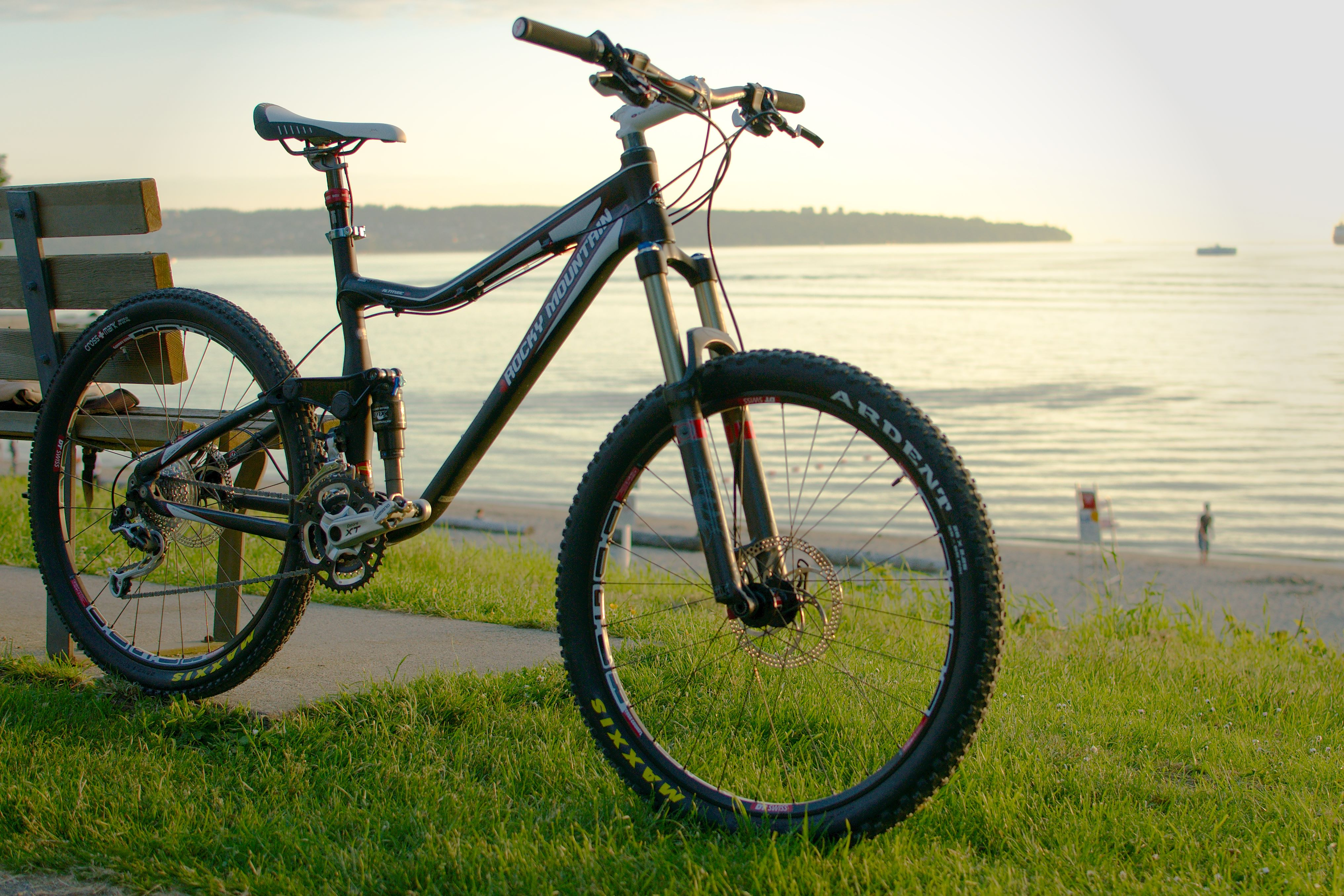
A Rocky Mountain Altitude 70 full-suspension mountain bike

=== Mountain bikes ===
Rocky Mountain is best known for its mountain bikes and produces a range of models for different riding styles and disciplines within the mountain category. As of 2011, the company offers over 30 different models, ranging from hard-tail cross country bikes to full-suspension downhill bikes. Rocky Mountain produces carbon fiber, aluminum alloy and steel mountain bike frames.

=== Road bikes ===
Rocky mountain began producing road bikes in 1984 and currently markets 11 performance road models and 2 cyclo-cross models, along with several "urban", "fitness" and "hybrid" bikes.

== Sponsored teams and athletes ==
=== Enduro ===
Rocky Mountain is a co-sponsor of the Rocky Mountain Race Face Enduro Team. The current team consists of Jesse Melamed, Rémi Gauvin, and Andréane Lanthier Nadeau.

=== Freeride ===
Rocky Mountain sponsors several professional freeride athletes including Wade Simmons, Thomas Vanderham, Hayden Zablotny and Vaea Verbeeck.
