= One Step Back =

Single by Jamie Warren

from the album Fallen Angel
- Released: 1996
- Genre: Country
- Length: 3:42
- Label: River North
- Songwriters: Jason Barry; Jamie Warren
- Producers: J. Richard Hutt; Fraser Hill

Jamie Warren singles chronology
"What Goes Around (Comes Around)" (1995)	"One Step Back" (1996)	"Watching Her Sleep" (1996)

"One Step Back" is a song recorded by Canadian country music artist Jamie Warren. It was released in 1996 as the third single from his debut album, Fallen Angel. It peaked at number 4 on the RPM Country Tracks chart in June 1996.

== Chart performance ==
Chart (1996)	Peak position
Canada Country Singles (RPM)	4

=== Year-end charts ===
Chart (1996)	Position
Canada Country Tracks (RPM)	15
