= Walkerton District Community School =

Coordinates: 44.11712°N 81.14846°W

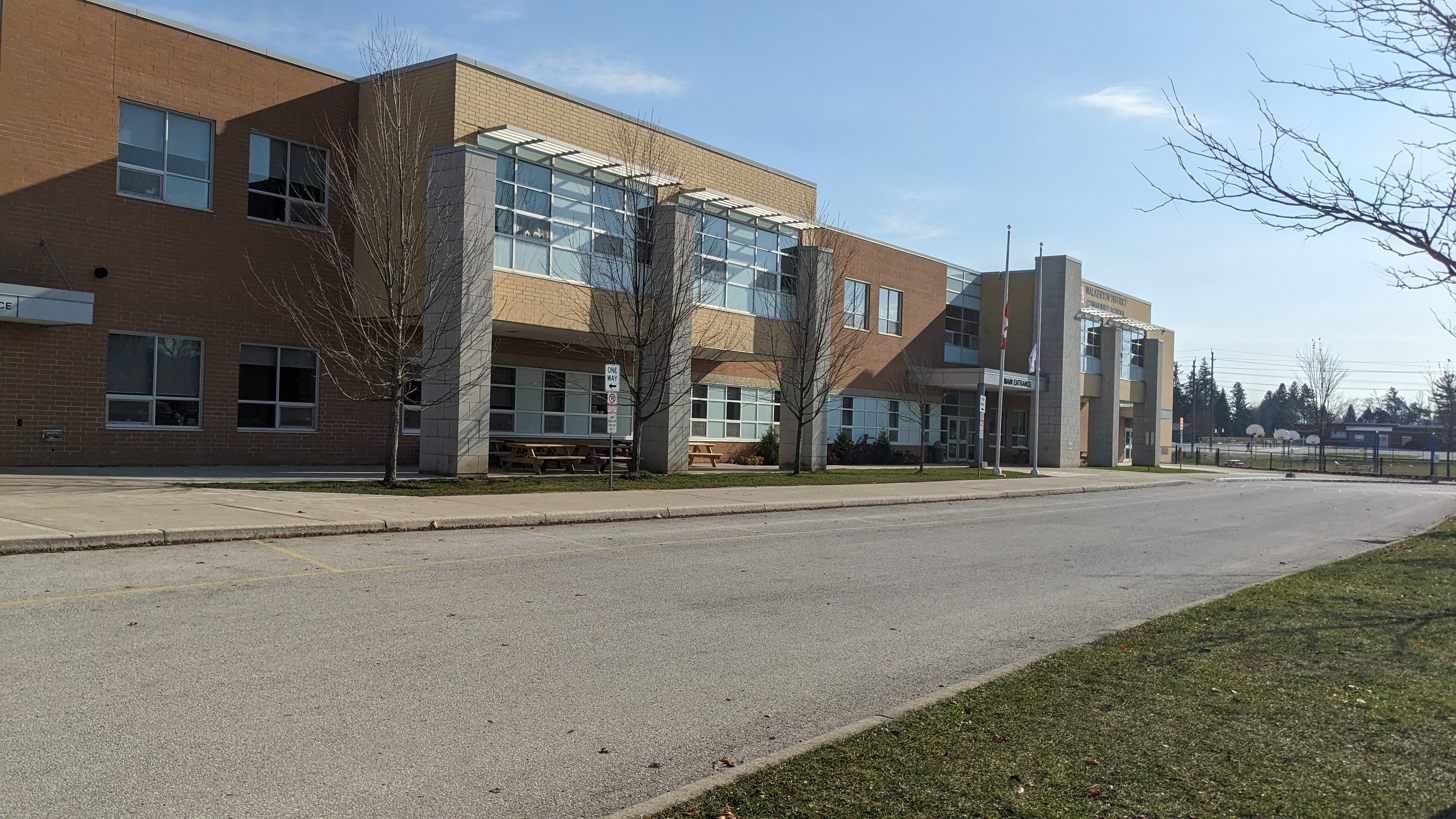

Location
- 1320 Younge Street South; Walkerton, Ontario, N2Z 2B9; Canada

Information
- School type: Community School
- Motto: Learn Today, Lead Tomorrow
- Founded: 2012
- School board: Bluewater District School Board
- Principal: Sarah Slater
- Key people: Stephanie Bouchard (vice principal)
- Grades: K–12
- Enrollment: 395 (2019/2020)
- Language: English
- Colours: Blue and White
- Mascot: River Hawks
- Website: www.wdcs.bwdsb.on.ca

Walkerton District Community School is a public K–12 school in Walkerton, Ontario, Canada.

== History ==
In 2008, the Bluewater District School Board released their plans for a combined K–12 school to replace Brant Central, Walkerton Public and Walkerton District Secondary schools. In September 2012, the new Walkerton District Community School opened.

In 2025, four students and a teacher perished in a traffic accident in London, Ontario. They had been heading back to Walkerton from a softball tournament.

== See also ==
- Education in Ontario
- List of secondary schools in Ontario
