= Ray Edwards (ice hockey) =

Canadian ice hockey coach and player

- Born: June 11, 1970 (age 55) Hanover, Ontario, Canada
- Height: 5 ft 11 in (180 cm)
- Weight: 201 lb (91 kg; 14 st 5 lb)
- Position: Right wing
- Shot: Right
- Played for: ECHL; Dayton Bombers; Birmingham Bulls; Huntington Blizzard
- NHL draft: Undrafted
- Playing career: 1991–1998

Ray Edwards (born June 11, 1970) is a Canadian ice hockey coach and former professional player.

== Early life and playing career ==
Born in 1970 in Hanover, Ontario, Edwards played the majority of his minor hockey in Wasaga Beach. Edwards played major junior hockey in the Ontario Hockey League. He began his professional career during the 1991–92 season with the Dayton Bombers of the ECHL. He went on to play 309 games in the ECHL, racking up 1,253 minutes in penalties and 174 points, before hanging up his skates to pursue a coaching career following the 1997–98 season.

== Coaching and executive career ==
After three seasons as a player-assistant for the Huntington Blizzard, Edwards was hired as the team's head coach. He later served two seasons with the San Angelo Saints, where was the general manager and was named the Central Hockey League coach-of-the-year. He later spent six seasons combined as a head coach in the American Hockey League for the San Antonio Rampage and the Portland Pirates.

Edwards was serving as director of player development for the Calgary Flames, when appointed an assistant coach after the resignation of head coach Bill Peters in December 2019.

== Career statistics ==
| | | | Regular season | | | | | Playoffs |
| Season | Team | League | GP | G | A | Pts | PIM | GP | G | A | Pts | PIM |
|---|---|---|---|---|---|---|---|---|---|---|---|---|
| 1986–87 | Owen Sound Greys | OJHL | 32 | 6 | 19 | 25 | 134 | — | — | — | — | — |
| 1987–88 | Sudbury Wolves | OHL | 21 | 0 | 3 | 3 | 68 | — | — | — | — | — |
| 1987–88 | Guelph Platers | OHL | 32 | 2 | 6 | 8 | 114 | — | — | — | — | — |
| 1988–89 | Guelph Platers | OHL | 45 | 10 | 16 | 26 | 159 | 4 | 0 | 0 | 0 | 2 |
| 1989–90 | Owen Sound Platers | OHL | 56 | 23 | 29 | 52 | 201 | 12 | 4 | 8 | 12 | 38 |
| 1990–91 | Owen Sound Platers | OHL | 8 | 2 | 3 | 5 | 38 | — | — | — | — | — |
| 1990–91 | Belleville Bulls | OHL | 49 | 23 | 24 | 47 | 180 | 6 | 2 | 2 | 4 | 12 |
| 1991–92 | Dayton Bombers | ECHL | 23 | 5 | 10 | 15 | 120 | 3 | 0 | 0 | 0 | 18 |
| 1992–93 | Birmingham Bulls | ECHL | 16 | 0 | 7 | 7 | 60 | — | — | — | — | — |
| 1992–93 | Dayton Bombers | ECHL | 29 | 7 | 7 | 14 | 107 | — | — | — | — | — |
| 1993–94 | Dayton Bombers | ECHL | 51 | 14 | 10 | 24 | 167 | — | — | — | — | — |
| 1994–95 | Huntington Blizzard | ECHL | 32 | 3 | 5 | 8 | 129 | 4 | 0 | 1 | 1 | 6 |
| 1995–96 | Huntington Blizzard | ECHL | 65 | 20 | 10 | 30 | 330 | — | — | — | — | — |
| 1996–97 | Huntington Blizzard | ECHL | 45 | 13 | 15 | 28 | 166 | — | — | — | — | — |
| 1997–98 | Huntington Blizzard | ECHL | 48 | 21 | 27 | 48 | 174 | 4 | 0 | 2 | 2 | 13 |
| ECHL totals | | | 309 | 83 | 91 | 174 | 1,253 | 11 | 0 | 3 | 3 | 37 |
