= Peninsula Shores District School =

Location
- 115 George St., Wiarton, Ontario; Canada; 44.74059°N 81.15088°W

Information
- Type: Public
- Established: September 2006
- School board: Bluewater District School Board
- Area trustee: Jane Thomson
- Principal: Kelly Wilkins
- Grades: JK to 12
- Mascot: Phoenix
- Website: psd.bwdsb.on.ca

Peninsula Shores District School serves students in Wiarton in Bruce County, Ontario, and is managed by the Bluewater District School Board. It has classes for Junior Kindergarten through grade 12, so it is a combined elementary and secondary school. It opened for the 2006–07 school year, replacing Wiarton District High School and Wiarton Public School.

The school's features include a 400-seat auditorium, gymnasium and computer labs.

Peninsula Shores offers a variety of programs and extra curricular activities to its students. Among its various academic programs, the school offers a Specialist High Skills Major program in Hospitality and Tourism to students in grades 11 and 12.

== See also ==
- Education in Ontario
- List of secondary schools in Ontario
