= Wiarton District High School =

- Canada

Information
- Website: www.psd.bwdsb.on.ca

The Wiarton District High School was a high school in Wiarton, Ontario, which was operated from 1892 to 2006. It was replaced with Peninsula Shores District School beginning in the 2006–07 school year.

Among the high school's graduates of note, is Lenore Keeshig-Tobias.

== See also ==
- List of high schools in Ontario
