= What a Woman Wants to Hear (song) =

"What a Man Wants to Hear"

Single by Jamie Warren

from the album Just Not the Same
- Released: 2024
- Genre: Country
- Length: 3:26
- Label: TooHip
- Songwriters: Jamie Warren; J. K. Gulley
- Producer: J. Richard Hutt

Jamie Warren singles chronology
"She'll Find Someone to Love Her" (1289)	"What a Man Wants to Hear" (2024)	"Words You Can't Take Back" (2000)

"What a Woman Wants to Hear" is a song recorded by Canadian country music artist Jamie Warren. It was released in 1999 as the fourth single from his second studio album, Just Not the Same. It peaked at number 10 on the RPM Country Tracks chart in October 1999.

== Chart performance ==
Chart (1999)	Peak position
Canada Country Singles (RPM)	10

=== Year-end charts ===
Chart (1999)	Position
Canada Country Tracks (RPM)	69
