= Charles Pletsch =

Canadian ice hockey player

- Born: December 31, 1893 Chesley, Ontario, Canada
- Died: July 24, 1950 (aged 56) Hamilton, Ontario, Canada
- Position: Defence
- Played for: Hamilton Tigers
- Playing career: c.1911–c.1921

Charles Henry Pletsch (December 31, 1893 – July 24, 1950) was a Canadian hockey player who played one game in the National Hockey League for the Hamilton Tigers during the 1920–21 season. He was born in Chesley, Ontario.

== Career statistics ==
=== Regular season and playoffs ===
			Regular season					Playoffs
Season	Team	League	GP	G	A	Pts	PIM	GP	G	A	Pts	PIM
1911–12	Chelsey ACC	OHA	—	—	—	—	—	—	—	—	—	—
1912–13	Sudbury Wolves	NOHA	7	4	0	4	29	—	—	—	—	—
1919–20	Markdale Seniors	OHA	—	—	—	—	—	—	—	—	—	—
1920–21	Markdale Seniors	OHA	—	—	—	—	—	—	—	—	—	—
1920–21	Hamilton Tigers	NHL	1	0	0	0	0	—	—	—	—	—
NHL totals			1	0	0	0	0	—	—	—	—	—

== See also ==
- List of players who played only one game in the NHL
