= Lenore Keeshig-Tobias =

Anishinabe writer

Lenore Keeshig-Tobias is an Anishinabe storyteller, poet, scholar, and journalist and a major advocate for Indigenous writers in Canada. She is a member of the Chippewas of Nawash Unceded First Nation. She was one of the central figures in the debates over cultural appropriation in Canadian literature in the 1990s. Along with Daniel David Moses and Tomson Highway, she was a founding member of the Indigenous writers' collective, Committee to Reestablish the Trickster.

== Family ==
Keeshig-Tobias was born Lenore Keeshig in Wiarton, Ontario in 1950, the eldest of ten children of Keitha (Johnston) and Donald Keeshig. Keeshig-Tobias credits her parents with raising her as a storyteller and with a love of poetry. Due to her mother's interest in poetry, Keeshig-Tobias' personal name came from Edgar Allen Poe's poem, "The Raven."

Keeshig-Tobias has four daughters and a son. Her spouse is David McLaren.

== Education ==
In primary school Keeshig-Tobias attended the St. Mary's Indian Day School on the Cape Croker Reserve. She started high school at Loretto Academy in Niagara Falls, Ontario, and graduated from Wiarton District High School.

She later attended York University in Toronto and received her Bachelor of Fine Arts in creative writing in 1983. During college she began actively writing poetry.

== Career ==
Lived in Toronto for years, returned to the Bruce Peninsula in the early 1990s.

2001–present worked at Parks Canada as a naturalist, cultural interpreter, and oral history researcher; and in the off-season she teaches at George Brown College in Toronto.

== Advocacy ==
From June 22–24, 1983, Keeshig-Tobias was one of two representatives of Sweetgrass Magazine to attend a meeting at Pennsylvania State University to consider whether it would be possible to found an Indigenous newspapers association. The meeting was organized by Tim Giago, Adrian Louis, and William Dulaney, and funded by the Gannett Foundation. This meeting marked the founding of the Native American Journalists Association.

In 1990, she published an essay in Canada's The Globe and Mail newspaper, entitled "Stop Stealing Native Stories," in which she critiqued non-Native writers' use of Native stories and experiences as a "theft of voice," pointing to the examples of Darlene Barry Quaife's Bone Bird, W.P. Kinsella's Hobbema, and the film Where the Spirit Lives. She argued that the prominence of these works by settler writers came at the expense of even the most celebrated works by Native writers, such as Basil Johnston's Indian School Days and Maria Campbell's Half Breed, which did not generate a comparable critical reception or institutional support.

In 1991, Keeshig-Tobias became the founding chair of the Racial Minority Writers' Committee at the Writers' Union of Canada after raising concerns about access to institutional and professional support for Indigenous and racialized writers.

Keeshig-Tobias served on the advisory board of Oyate, an advocacy and education organization focusing on Native American/Indigenous Peoples' experiences.

In 1992, the Racial Minority Writers' Committee organized The Appropriate Voice, a gathering of 70 Indigenous and racialized writers in Orillia, Ontario meant to identify their shared concerns and barriers to publishing in Canada. This session produced a motion against cultural appropriation that was forwarded to the Writers' Union of Canada and passed by its general membership on June 6, 1992.

These efforts led to the 1994 Writing Thru Race conference, a gathering of Indigenous and racialized writers in Vancouver, hosted by the Writers' Union of Canada. Keeshig-Tobias addressed the gathering on the opening night of the event. Writing Thru Race is now considered to be a major milestone in race politics and literature in Canada.

== Published works ==
=== Creative writing ===
==== Juvenile literature ====
- Bird Talk/Bineshiinh Dibaajmowin (Sister Vision Press, 1991) - In English and Ojibway; illustrated by her daughter, Polly Keeshig-Tobias
- The Short-Cut (Fitzhenry & Whiteside Limited, 1995)
- Emma and the Trees/Emma minwaah mtigooh (Sister Vision Press, 1996) - In English and Ojibway; illustrated by her daughter, Polly Keeshig-Tobias
- The Truth about Nibbles (Ningwakwe Learning Press, 2005) - In English; co-authored by her spouse, David McLaren; illustrated by her daughter, Polly Keeshig-Tobias

==== Selected poetry ====
- Running on the March Wind (Quatro Books, 2015) - first full book
- "Those Anthropologists" in: Fireweed: A Feminist Quarterly of Writing, Politics, Art & Culture (Winter, 1986) p. 108.

==== Stories ====
- "The Porcupine" in: Tales for an Unknown City (edited by Dan Yashinsky, McGill-Queen's University Press, 1992)

=== Served as editor ===
==== Books ====
- Into the Moon: Heart, Mind, Body, Soul (Sister Vision Press, 1996) - an anthology of poetry, fiction, myth, and personal essays by Native women
- All My Relations: Sharing Native Values Through the Arts (Canadian Alliance in Solidarity with Native Peoples, 1988) - co-editor Catherine Verrall
- Walking a Tightrope: Aboriginal People and Their Representations (Waterloo, Ont. : Wilfrid Laurier University Press, 2005) - co-editors Drew Hayden Taylor, Philip Bellfy, David Newhouse, Mark Dockstator et al

==== Periodicals ====
- The Ontario Indian (1981-1982) - editor
- Sweetgrass Magazine: The Magazine of Canada's Native Peoples (1982-1985) - co-founder and editor
- The Magazine to Re-establish the Trickster (1988-1997)

=== Scholarly and activist writing ===
- "The Magic of Others" in: Language in Her Eye: Views on Writing and Gender by Canadian Women Writing in English, edited by Libby Scheier, Sarah Sheard and Eleanor Wachtel: Coach House Press, 1990.
- Resource reading list: annotated bibliography of resources by and about native people (Canadian Alliance in Solidarity with Native Peoples, multiple years)
- "Of Hating, Hurting, and Coming to Terms With the English Language" in:Canadian Journal of Native Education, Vol. 27, No. 1, Advancing Aboriginal Language and Literacy, 2003, pp. 89–100.
- Contemporary Challenges: Conversations with Canadian Native Authors Hartmut Lutz Fifth House Publishers, 1991
- "Not Just Entertainment" in: Through Indian Eyes: The Native Experience in Books for Children, edited by Beverly Slapin and Doris Seale
- Keeshig-Tobias, Lenore and McLaren, David, (1987), "For As Long As the Rivers Flow", This Magazine, Volume 21, No. 3, July, pp. 21–26.
- Keeshig-Tobias, Lenore.1984. (a found poem). In A Gathering of Spirit: A Collection by North American Indian Women, ed. Beth Brant, 123-24. Toronto: The Women's Press
- Lenore Keeshig-Tobias. “White Lies.” Saturday Night, October:67-68.
- Beyer, David and Tobias-Keeshig, Lenore. Powwow Dancer. Sweetgrass (July/August 1984)
- The Spirit of Turtle Island. Tobias, Lenore Keeshig. Nova Productions, 1988. 1 videorecording (28 min.)

== Awards and grants ==
Grants:

- Department of Indian Affairs and Northern Development (1979, 1980)
- Ontario Arts Council (1986-1989)

Awards:

- Living the Dream Book Award (1993, illustrator Polly Keeshig-Tobias): for Bird Talk - selected by students at a coalition of public and private schools as the book that best reflect the values of Dr. Martin Luther King, Jr.
- Author's Award (1987 with McLaren) for: "For As Long As the Rivers Flow", This Magazine, Volume 21, No. 3, July, pp. 21–26.
