= Solomon Yeomans Chesley =

Upper Canada public servant and politician

Member of the Legislative Assembly of the Province of Canada for Cornwall
- In office 1841–1844
- Preceded by: New position

Mayor of Cornwall
- In office 1860–1861

Personal details
- Born: April 20, 1796 Schodack, New York
- Died: November 5, 1880 (aged 84) Ottawa, Ontario
- Party: Upper Canada Tories
- Spouse: Margaret Ann Vankoughnet
- Occupation: Public servant

Solomon Yeomans Chesley (April 29, 1796 – November 5, 1880) was a public servant and political figure in Canada West.

He was born in Shodack, in Rensselaer County, New York, in 1796 and came to Cornwall with his parents in 1800. In 1806, he settled on Mohawk land at St. Regis. He became fluent in the language and became an interpreter in the Indian Department. He served during the War of 1812, becoming lieutenant of the St Regis Company of Indian Warriors in 1814. In 1832, he became superintendent at St Regis. Chesley created some controversy in 1835 when he arranged for a schoolmaster to teach there without consulting the Roman Catholic Church.

He first sought elected office in 1836, when he stood for election to the Legislative Assembly of Upper Canada as a Tory but was defeated. In 1841, he was elected to the Legislative Assembly of the new Province of Canada, serving one term as member for Cornwall. He was one of the Family Compact Tories in the Assembly who supported the union of the Canadas but opposed Governor General Lord Sydenham's attempt to build a broad base of support in the Assembly for his government, including Reformers as well as Tories. While in office, he opposed the development of the Beauharnois Canal, which led to some land at St Regis being submerged.

He continued working with the Indian Department until 1859, when it was transferred from the British government to the government of the Province of Canada. He retired that year, having served several times as acting superintendent-general and being the longest-serving member of the Indian Department.

On his retirement, Chesley returned to Cornwall. In 1860, he was elected mayor of the city, serving for one year. He later moved to Ottawa. In 1872, he became a member of the New England Company, a Church of England society that promoted education for native people. Chelsey died in Ottawa in 1880.

The town of Chesley, in Bruce County, was named after him.
