= Frank Gross =

Frank George Gross
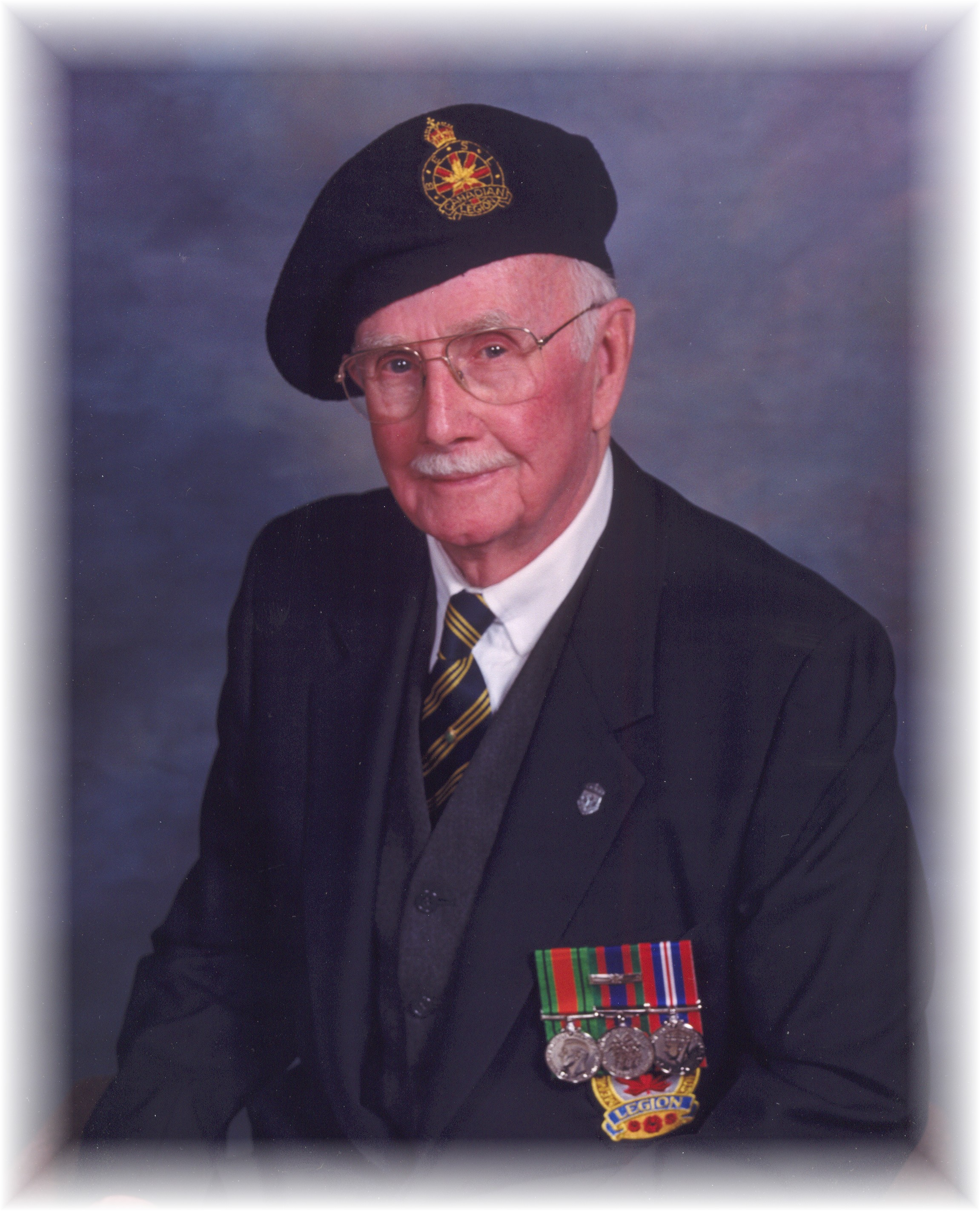
- Frank Gross, wearing service medals ca. 2005
- Born: May 23, 1919; Chesley, Ontario
- Died: January 13, 2006 (aged 86); Chatham-Kent, Ontario
- Occupation: Life insurance underwriter
- Known for: Philanthropy
- Awards: Ontario Medal for Good Citizenship, 2006

Frank George Gross, OMC (May 23, 1919 – January 13, 2006) was a philanthropist awarded the Ontario Medal for Good Citizenship (OMC) one month after his death in 2006. He is the only Chatham-Kent resident to be recognized by the Government of Ontario for humanitarianism.

For 50 years, he had been well known in the Chatham-Kent region as a life insurance underwriter, war veteran, freemason, cyclist and humanitarian mainly for the Canadian Cancer Society. Over the last 20 years of his life, he was recognized with nine local, provincial or national awards for humanitarian contributions.

== Military service and business career ==
Frank Gross was enlisted in the Canadian Army on August 8, 1942, stationed at CFB Borden, Ontario and Aldershot, England and trained in tank operations. Rising to the rank of Corporal, he served in England during World War II as a tank trainer until his discharge on March 22, 1946. For war service, he was awarded the Defence Medal, the Canadian Volunteer Service Medal and the War Medal, all displayed in the adjacent picture. Upon his return to Canada, Frank became a lifelong member of the Royal Canadian Legion, Branch 28, Chatham.

Over the period of 1946-1956, Frank was a salesman for Fuller Brush Company after which he joined London Life Insurance Company as a life underwriter. He was President of the Kent County Life Underwriters Association in 1963 and was recognized for 21 consecutive years with the National Quality Award from the Canadian Life Insurance Association. Frank retired from London Life in 1983.

== Freemasonry ==
Frank Gross was initiated into the Parthenon Lodge, number 267 of the Masonic Order, in Chatham, Ontario, September, 1949. He rose to become Worshipful Master of Parthenon Lodge in 1954, was nominated to the Scottish Rite Lodge of Perfection and Rose Croix in 1958, and was distinguished with the Gold Honor Award, York Rite Sovereign College of North America, for Outstanding Masonry on May 7, 2002.

Frank was recognized with the Outstanding Service Certificate for Contributions to Masonry and Volunteering, November 25, 2002, presented by the Grand Master of the Grand Lodge of Ontario. To celebrate the 150th Anniversary of the Grand Lodge of Ontario, the Masonic District Deputy Grand Master for Chatham-Kent designated the 2005 fund-raising effort in support of Frank Gross for his annual Great Ride Against Cancer, raising $18,155.

Each year over 2006-8, the Parthenon Lodge provided to a local graduating high school student a cash bursary named the Frank Gross Academic and Humanitarian Award.

== Cycling and philanthropy ==
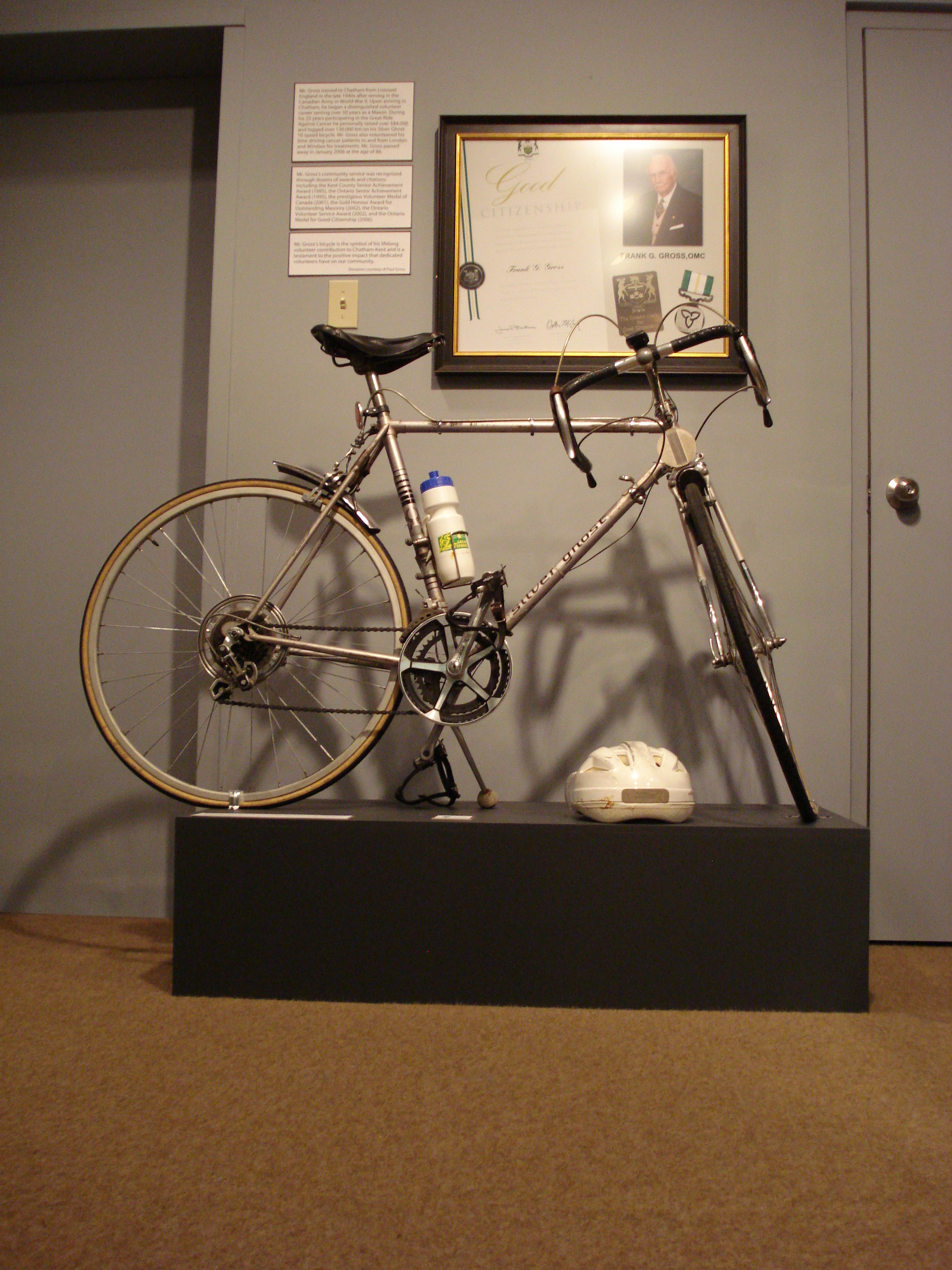
Silver Ghost bike on display at the Chatham-Kent Museum, April–September, 2008

Wearing his red cycling clothing and riding the only 10-speed road bike he ever owned—a 1979 CCM Silver Ghost—Frank Gross was a familiar sight on Chatham-Kent streets and roads over the period of his cycling years, 1976 to November 3, 2005, his last log entry of 11.75 miles. Gross logged 89,829 miles or 145,523 km over his 29 years of cycling.

From April until September, 2008, the Silver Ghost and a history of Frank Gross' charitable activities were on display in the Chatham-Kent Museum (picture).

Beginning in 1979, Frank participated each year through 2005 in the Annual Great Ride Against Cancer held by the Chatham-Kent branch of the Canadian Cancer Society. By pledges received for his rides, Frank collected $83,584 from 2,622 total sponsors over these 26 years of fund-raising for cancer research and was the single largest fundraiser almost every year.

== Community service and awards ==
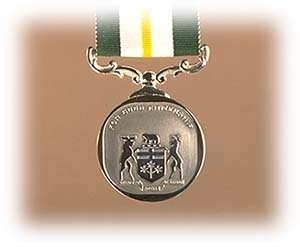
Ontario Medal for Good Citizenship awarded posthumously to Frank Gross, February 7, 2006

Frank Gross donated his time generously, often spending hours visiting hospitalized neighbors, Masonic Lodge brothers, their family members or elderly friends unable to leave their homes. From 1994-2003, he was a volunteer driver for the Chatham-Kent branch of the Canadian Cancer Society, logging 243 trips and 33,824 miles or 56,374 km transporting a total of 409 patients in his own vehicle between Chatham and London or Windsor hospitals.

For these activities and his cycling on behalf of fund-raising for cancer research, Frank was recognized with the following local, provincial or national awards as reported by two Chatham newspapers:

- Kent County Senior Achievement Award, June 16, 1995, from Hon. Michael Harris, Premier of Ontario, July 24, 1995
- Ontario Senior Achievement Award, Parliament Buildings, Queen’s Park (Toronto), June 20, 1995, presented by Lieutenant Governor of Ontario, Henry Jackman
- Canadian Red Cross Society, Distinguished Humanitarian Award, July, 1995
- Certificate of Appreciation, Royal Canadian Legion, Ontario Command, Branch 28-Chatham, 1998
- 20 year Service Award, Canadian Cancer Society, October 29, 1999
- International Year of Volunteers, Government of Canada Medal, presented at Chatham-Kent Council Meeting, Chatham City Hall, December 17, 2001
- Ontario Volunteer Service Award, September 17, 2002, presented by Hon. Carl DeFaria, Ontario Ministry of Citizenship and Immigration
- Ontario Medal for Good Citizenship (posthumous), Ontario Ministry of Citizenship and Immigration, Parliament Buildings, Queen’s Park, Toronto, February 7, 2006, presented by Lieutenant Governor of Ontario, James Bartleman
- Memorial Banquet and Community Partner Award, Canadian Cancer Society, October 28, 2006

== Family and death ==
Gross was born in Chesley, Ontario, had lived in Listowel, Ontario until 1948, and established his residence in Chatham at 11 Stone Avenue in April, 1948.

Frank Gross married Lilian Gladys Bailey (June 23, 1914 - September 23, 1994) of Brooklin, Ontario on June 16, 1941. They had two sons, Phillip Garth (April 18, 1947 born in Listowel) and Paul Munn (April 17, 1950 born in Chatham).

Following complications associated with cancer of the pancreas first identified on December 28, 2005, Frank Gross died at the Chatham-Kent Public Health Alliance Hospital at 08.34 on Friday, January 13, 2006.
