= Alison Bradley =

Canadian softball left fielder

Alison Bradley (born April 27, 1979 in Walkerton, Ontario) is a Canadian softball left fielder.

Bradley began playing softball at the age of seven. She eventually became a student at the University of Western Ontario. She was a part of the Canadian softball team who finished 9th at the 2002 World Championships in Saskatoon, Saskatchewan and 5th at the 2004 Summer Olympics. The team also competed in the 2008 Summer Olympics in Beijing.
