= CCM (bicycle company) =

Canadian bicycle manufacturer

Canada Cycle & Motor Co. Ltd.
- Type: Private
- Industry: sporting goods
- Founded: 1899 in Weston, Ontario
- Headquarters: Canada
- Products: bicycles

CCM is a Canadian bicycle brand owned by Canadian Tire. The brand was first used by the Canada Cycle & Motor Co. Ltd, founded in Weston, Ontario in 1899. CCM dominated the Canadian bike market for much of the 20th century before becoming bankrupt in 1983. The CCM trademark was then acquired by Procycle Group, while the company's hockey assets were sold off (CCM Hockey).

== History ==
The formation of C.C.M. came at the same time as an American bicycle industry consolidation: the American Bicycle Company was formed by 42 manufacturers. Soon afterwards, American Bicycle Company announced plans to open a branch plant in Canada called the National Cycle Company.

C.C.M. was established upon the amalgamation of the operations of four major Canadian bicycle manufacturers: H.A. Lozier, Massey-Harris, Goold, and Welland Vale Manufacturing. The company then accounted for 85% of Canadian cycle production.

Around 1899, many smaller bicycle makers went out of business, and C.C.M. soon became Canada's industry leader.

=== Russell Motor Car Company ===
In 1903, weakness in the bicycle market prompted C.C.M. to acquire the assets of Canadian Motors Ltd. (CML), a failed automobile producer. Tommy Russell, C.C.M.'s new general manager, saw an opportunity to diversify his company's product line.

In 1904, anticipating the growing market for motorcars, C.C.M. established the Russell Motor Car Company in Toronto.

=== C.C.M. Weston Factory ===
In 1895, H.A. Lozier & Co. opened a bicycle manufacturing plant on St. Clair Avenue in the Town of Toronto Junction (as the town was then officially called). Massey-Harris and Gendron Bicycles also moved some bike manufacturing to the Junction in the HA Lozier factory.

Montreal, Winnipeg, and Vancouver, were originally part of a diversified network of C.C.M. manufacturing processes. By 1917, C.C.M.'s bicycle manufacturing operations had moved into a larger factory on Lawrence Avenue West east of what is now called Weston Road in Weston, Ontario; manufacturing continued at the facility until 1980.

From 1939 to 1945, during the Second World War, C.C.M.'s cycle's manufacturing facilities were taken over by the Canadian government and declared an essential war service. Two simple, one-speed bicycles were manufactured and then shipped in wooden packing crates to the Canadian army. They produced motorcars, which have allegedly been used as light military vehicles. Due to a rubber shortage in 1942, the pedals of C.C.M. Rambler bicycles had wooden blocks. According to WWII veterans, the Rambler was popular with U.S. and British armed forces as well as Canadians.

By the late 1970s, the company was experiencing yearly losses and had to rely on the government for loans to keep itself solvent. A change of ownership failed to improve matters and the company declared bankruptcy in January 1983.

Today, the site of the former C.C.M. factory in Weston is the location of a Tim Hortons coffee shop The community continues to honour CCM with bicycle themed lampposts.

=== Procycle Group Inc. ===
Shortly after C.C.M. declared bankruptcy in 1983, all of the assets of the company were purchased by Procycle Group Inc. of Québec who retained the bicycle division and sold off the hockey division to Montréal businessman David Zunenshine.

Procycle has acquired rights to a number of cycling brands for use on various lines of bicycles. At some point, Procycle renamed CCM to 'CCM Cycle' to better differentiate the brand from the separate CCM Hockey business.

In 1999, the CCM brand turned 100 years old. After a 101-year history, over 10,000,000 bikes had been manufactured in Canada bearing the CCM name.

As of 2004, Procycle was the largest bicycle manufacturer in Canada, building 200,000 CCM-branded bikes per year across Canada and the USA.

The CCM Cycle website remained online until February 2008, then displayed an under construction message until the end of May 2008 when it went offline.

In an Industry Canada company directory profile updated in February 2010, Procycle lists only two bicycle brands and divisions, Miele and Rocky Mountain, as reflected on the Procycle website. Canadian Tire has since acquired the rights to the brand

== Models ==
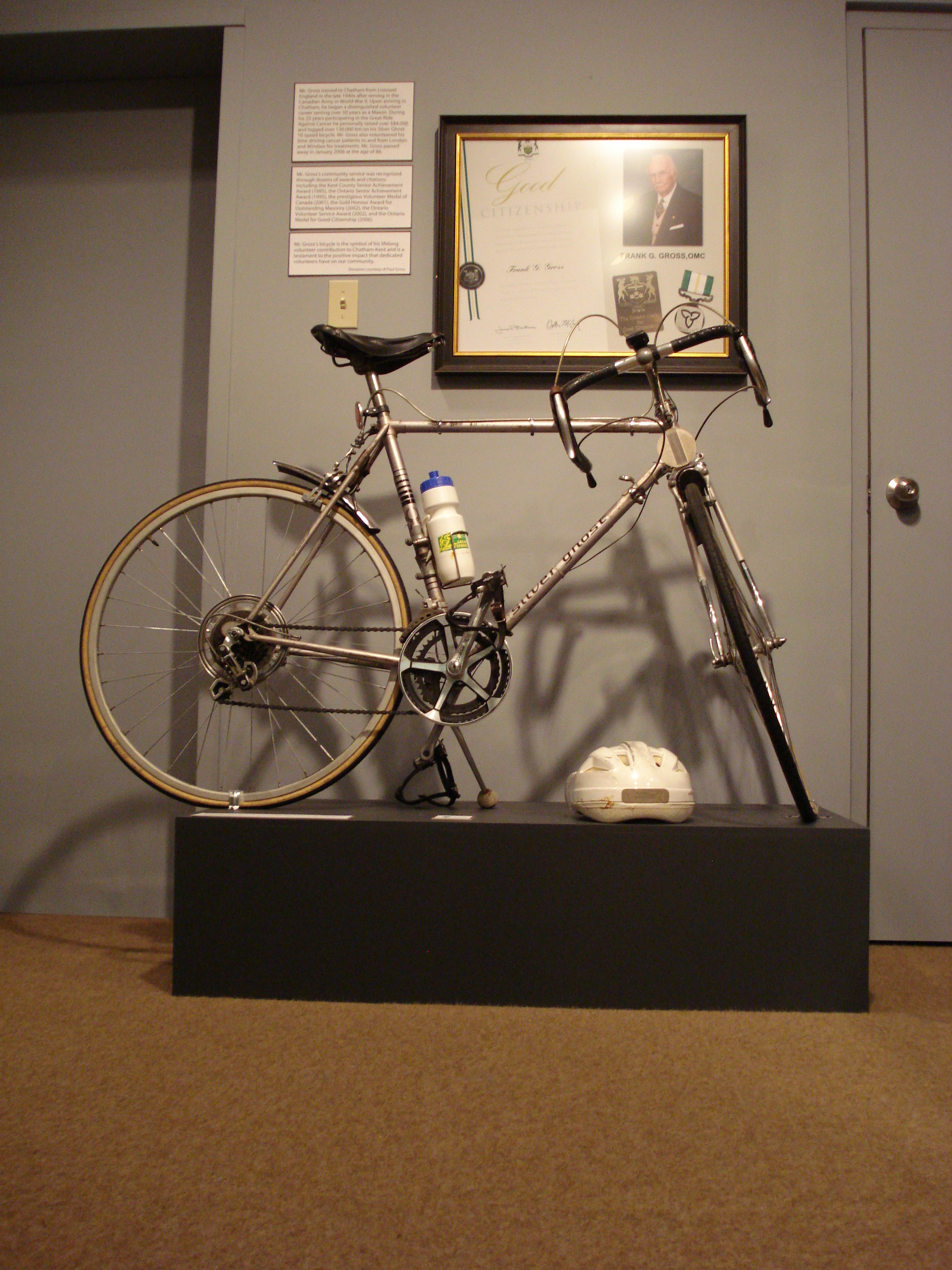
Frank Gross's 1979 CCM Silver Ghost bike on display at the Chatham-Kent Museum, Ontario

C.C.M. manufactured a wide variety of bicycles.

The C.C.M. Motor Bicycle was manufactured between 1910 and 1911. Only three are known to exist. Double or twin bar bicycles were produced from around 1917 to 1962. In 1922 the Company introduced the Joycycle, a new three-wheeler.

Around 1932, C.C.M. introduced the Light Delivery Bicycle, a cargo bike with a stronger frame made of heavier gauge tubing and a basket. Previously, bicycles had been used as "commercial vehicles, either in a tricycle configuration or as modified touring tricycles." In the late 1940s, a "Pixie" bicycle motor was installed to assist with heavy loads and climbing hills. One Ottawa greengrocer was seen using one of these delivery bikes from the 1930s until the early 1960s. C.C.M. introduced the aviation-inspired Flyte, designed by Harvey W. Peace, in 1936 and sold it until 1940. The Flyte advertising poster described a frame of aeroplane seamless steel tubing, a C.C.M. Triplex Hanger crankset, a C.C.M. Hercules Coaster Brake, Dunlop "Fort" Tires and other high-grade equipment.

Most CCM bikes were simple mass-market bicycles. According to an old CCM cycle website, the CCM Mustang Marauder was the popular children's wheelie bike similar to the Schwinn Sting-Ray or the Raleigh Chopper. The CCM Scamp was another children's model. During the 1970s, the company produced the popular and inexpensive CCM Targa road bike, as well as higher-end road bikes including the Silver Ghost and the Campagnolo-equipped (custom built) Tour du Canada. City- and touring models included the Calico, Capri, Centennial, Concorde, Elan, Elite, Encore, Galaxie, Grand Sport, Imperial, Sunspot and Targa. The CCM Ranger resembled the CCM Rambler, but with 26" wheels.

== See also ==
- CCM (ice hockey)
