= Jamie Warren =

Canadian singer-songwriter (born 1961)

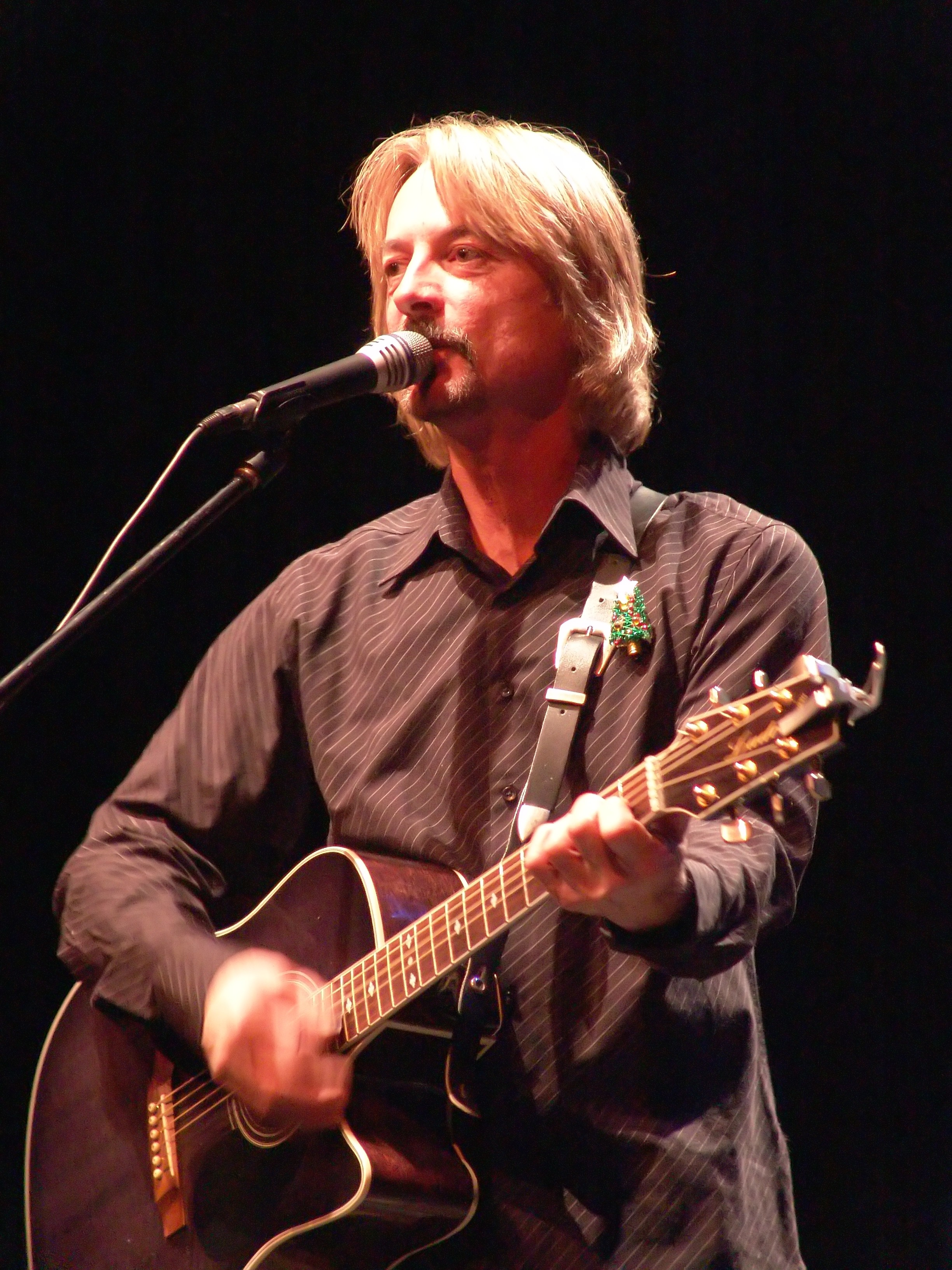
- Jamie Warren, November 2005

Background information
- Born: Jamie Glenn Warren; April 8, 1961 (age 65)
- Origin: Hanover, Ontario, Canada
- Genres: Country
- Occupation: singer-songwriter
- Instruments: Guitar, Piano
- Years active: 1984–present
- Label: TooHip Music
- Website: www.jamiewarren.com

Jamie Warren (born April 8, 1961) is a country music singer-songwriter, and the most awarded independent male artist in the Canadian country music industry.

== Biography ==
Jamie Warren took piano lessons when he was 5 years old, and guitar lessons at 8. When he was 14, he wrote his first song. After high school, he did airshifts local radio stations, but maintained his interest in singing. He won the Youth Talent Search at London's Western Fair, and was sent to Memphis, Tennessee to compete with other North American winners. This led Warren to a year performing at Libertyland amusement park in Memphis.

When Warren returned to Ontario, he began working with producer J. Richard "Rick" Hutt. His first single, "World of a Child," was released in 1984. Independently, he released six more singles in the 1980s, including "Take Me Home Mississippi," which peaked at No. 10 in 1985. Later that year, Warren won the RPM Big Country Award for Best New Artist. When his career slowed down, he took time off to start a family, writing and playing in his spare time.

In 1993, Warren began work on his first album release on his own record label, TooHip Music. The first single, "Ready to Run," was released in 1995 and peaked at No. 50 on the Canadian Country Singles chart. Warren wasn't originally planning to include the song on his album. Fallen Angel was released in 1996 in both Canada and the United States. While the album didn't perform well in the US, it was a success in Canada. Singles released from the album include "What Goes Around (Comes Around)," "Watching Her Sleep," and the 1996 top 5 hit "One Step Back."

Warren began work on his second album, Just Not the Same, in 1997. The album was released the following year on the heels of his top 10 single, "Cried All the Way Home." Four more singles from the album reached the Canadian top 20, including the top 10 singles "The Way Love Goes" and "What a Woman Wants to Hear." Country Magazine named Just Not the Same the Best Album of 1999. When the Canadian Country Music Association (CCMA) awards were handed out in 1999, Warren was named Independent Male Vocalist of the Year, and "Cried All the Way Home" was named Independent Single of the Year. Warren swept the 1999 Ontario Country Music Awards (OCMA), winning every award he was nominated for, including Male Artist of the Year, Single Release of the Year ("Cried All the Way Home"), Video of the Year ("Cried All the Way Home"), CD Release of the Year (Just Not the Same), and Songwriter of the Year. He also received nominations at the 1999 RPM Big Country Awards (Male Vocalist of the Year) and the Juno Awards (Best Country Male Vocalist).

2000 was another big year for Warren, with the top 20 single "Sunny Day in the Park." He was named Male Vocalist of the Year by the OCMA for the second year, and the Ontario Country Performer and Fan Association (OCPFA) awarded Warren Single of the Year for "Cried All the Way Home" and Songwriter of the Year for "Words You Can't Take Back." He was also nominated for Male Vocalist of the Year by the CCMA, the Junos and RPM. Warren won two awards, Single of the Year ("Sunny Day in the Park") and Songwriter of the Year ("Sunny Day in the Park") at the 2002 OCPFA Awards.

Warren's third album, Really, was released in 2003. Four singles were released from the project, "Without You," "What More Can You Say," "Reanne" and "Where's the Love," but they all missed the Canadian top 30. Warren released his greatest hits collection, Make Me Believe, in October 2005. The album included 14 of Warren's most successful singles, along with five new tracks. Four of those songs received airplay on Canadian country radio, "She Kissed Me," "I Saw Her Standing There," "You're My Everything" and the title track.

Warren's fourth studio album, Right Here Right Now, was released in April 2008.

== Discography ==
=== Studio albums ===
Title	Details
Fallen Angel	Release date: September 9, 1996; Label: River North Records
Just Not the Same	Release date: 1998; Label: TooHip Music
Really	Release date: 2003; Label: TooHip Music
Right Here Right Now	Release date: April 29, 2008; Label: TooHip Music
Howl at the Moon	Release date: May 18, 2010; Label: TooHip Music
I've Got a Feeling	Release date: June 24, 2013; Label: TooHip Music

=== Compilation albums ===
Title	Details
Make Me Believe	Release date: October 18, 2005; Label: TooHip Music

=== Singles ===
==== 1984–2000 ====
Year	Single	Peak chart positions		Album
Year	Single	CAN Country	CAN AC	Album
1984	"World of a Child"	—	26	Singles only
1984	"We Care About Us" (with Madonna Tassi)	34	—	Singles only
1985	"Take Me Home Mississippi"	10	—	Singles only
1985	"Too Good to Be True"	—	26	Singles only
1995	"Ready to Run"	26	—	Fallen Angel
1995	"What Goes Around (Comes Around)"	25	—	Fallen Angel
1996	"One Step Back"	4	—	Fallen Angel
1996	"Watching Her Sleep"	12	—	Fallen Angel
1996	"Fallen Angel"	30	—	Fallen Angel
1997	"The Secret"	32	—	Fallen Angel
1998	"Cried All the Way Home"	7	—	Just Not the Same
1998	"The Way Love Goes"	10	—	Just Not the Same
1999	"She'll Find Someone to Love Her"	14	—	Just Not the Same
1999	"What a Woman Wants to Hear"	10	—	Just Not the Same
2000	"Words You Can't Take Back"	22	—	Just Not the Same
2000	"Sunny Day in the Park"	16	—	Just Not the Same
"—" denotes releases that did not chart

==== 2001–present ====
Year	Single	Album
2001	"You Can't Get Your Goodbye Back"	Just Not the Same
2003	"Without You"	Really
2003	"What More Can You Say"	Really
2004	"Reanne"	Really
2004	"Where's the Love"	Really
2005	"She Kissed Me"	Make Me Believe
2005	"I Saw Her Standing There"	Make Me Believe
2006	"You're My Everything"	Make Me Believe
2006	"Make Me Believe"	Make Me Believe
2007	"She's Not Lyin'"	Right Here Right Now
2008	"She Just Loves to Dance"	Right Here Right Now
2008	"Right Here Right Now"	Right Here Right Now
2008	"Let Me Drive"	Right Here Right Now
2009	"I'm Getting Closer"	Right Here Right Now
2010	"Letting Go"	Howl at the Moon
2010	"What's Killin' Me"	Howl at the Moon
2011	"Howl at the Moon"	Howl at the Moon
2011	"I Believe in You"	Howl at the Moon
2012	"Let's Get Our Forget On"	I've Got a Feeling
2013	"She Saved Me"	I've Got a Feeling
2013	"A Beautiful Moment in Time"	I've Got a Feeling

=== Music videos ===
Year	Video	Director
1995	"Ready to Run"	
1995	"What Goes Around (Comes Around)"	
1996	"One Step Back"	
1996	"Watching Her Sleep"	
1997	"The Secret"	
1998	"Cried All the Way Home"	
1998	"The Way Love Goes"	
1999	"She'll Find Someone to Love Her"	
1999	"What a Woman Wants to Hear"	Terrance Odette
2000	"Words You Can't Take Back"	
2000	"Sunny Day in the Park"	Terrance Odette
2008	"Right Here Right Now"	
2018	"Do You Think of Me (Dad's Song)"	

Cows And Corn 2021
