= Bluewater District School Board =

School board in Chesley, Ontario, Canada

Location
- Chesley, Ontario, Canada Canada
- Coordinates: 44°18′36″N 81°05′52″W

District information
- Chair of the board: Jane Thomson
- Director of education: AJ Keene
- Schools: 41 elementary schools 9 secondary schools
- Budget: CA$299,099,413 million (2025-2026)

Other information
- Elected trustees: Jane Thomson (South Bruce Peninsula, Northern Bruce Peninsula); Tracy Lynn Atkinson (West Grey, Hanover); Wayne Peeters (Southgate, Grey Highlands); Michael Craig (Owen Sound); Jan Johnstone (Kincardine, Huron-Kinloss); Katie Lutz (Saugeen Shores, Arran-Elderslie); Marilyn McComb (Georgian Bluffs. Chatsworth); Fran Morgan (Meaford, The Blue Mountains); Derrick Long (Brockton, South Bruce)
- Website: www.bwdsb.on.ca

Bluewater District School Board (known as English-language Public District School Board No. 7 prior to 1999) is a school board in the Canadian province of Ontario, with jurisdiction for the operation of schools in Bruce and Grey Counties.

Its head office is located in Chesley, in the Municipality of Arran-Elderslie of Bruce County.

Bluewater District School Board has approximately 18,900 students in 41 elementary schools and nine secondary schools. BWDSB has approximately 3,700 permanent and casual staff, including teachers. There are nine elected trustees on the board and one appointed First Nations trustee.

== Early years of education in Bruce and Grey ==
=== Bruce County ===
The county's first school was established in Kincardine in 1851, followed by Southampton and Walkerton in 1852. At that time, the United Counties of Huron and Bruce comprised one school district, but Bruce County would receive its own superintendent in 1853, and the county itself would be divided into three school districts in 1855:

Initial school districts in Bruce County (1855)
District	Townships
Western	Huron, Kincardine, Bruce and Kinloss
Northern	Saugeen, Arran and Elderslie
Eastern	Brant, Carrick, Culross and Greenock

The first grammar school would be established at Kincardine in 1860, followed by others in Walkerton (1872), Wiarton (1892) and Chesley (1904). Model schools would be formed in 1877 for the training of teachers, at Kincardine and Walkerton.

In the 50 years to 1901, the network of schools had grown to the following size:

Schools and students in Bruce County (1901)
Type of school	Schools	Students
Public schools	246	12,614
High schools	4	480
Model schools	2	38
Separate schools	8	735
Totals	260	13,867

=== Grey County ===
After an initial division into three school districts in November 1854, Grey County was reorganized into four districts two years later:

School districts in Grey County (1856)
District	Townships
1	Derby, Sydenham, Holland and Sullivan
2	Bentinck, Egremont, Glenelg and Normanby
3	St Vincent, Euphrasia and Collingwood
4	Artemisia, Osprey, Melancthon and Proton

Owen Sound established its first primary school in the early 1840s, and its grammar school in 1856.

=== Schools in 1960 ===
The Ontario Department of Education reported in 1960 that the school network in Bruce and Grey consisted of the following:

Schools, teachers and students in Bruce and Grey counties (1960)
Type of school	Bruce County			Grey County		
Type of school	Schools	Teachers	Students	Schools	Teachers	Students
Public schools	149	231	6,350	214	388	10,379
High schools (rural)	9	93	2,198	7	76	1,801
High schools (city)	–	–	–	2	64	1,471
Separate schools	15	35	1,455	8	21	658
Totals	173	359	10,003	231	549	14,309

== County and district reorganizations (1969 and 1999) ==
The Bruce County Board of Education and the Grey County Board of Education were constituted at the beginning of 1969, as a result of legislation passed by the Legislative Assembly of Ontario in 1968.

As part of the province-wide restructuring of Ontario's school boards as a consequence of the passage of the Fewer School Boards Act, 1997, the "English-language Public District School Board No. 7" was created to take over the schools of the former county boards. It was merged with the former boards at the beginning of 1998, and was renamed as the "Bluewater District School Board" in 1999.

== Athletics of the Bluewater District School Board ==
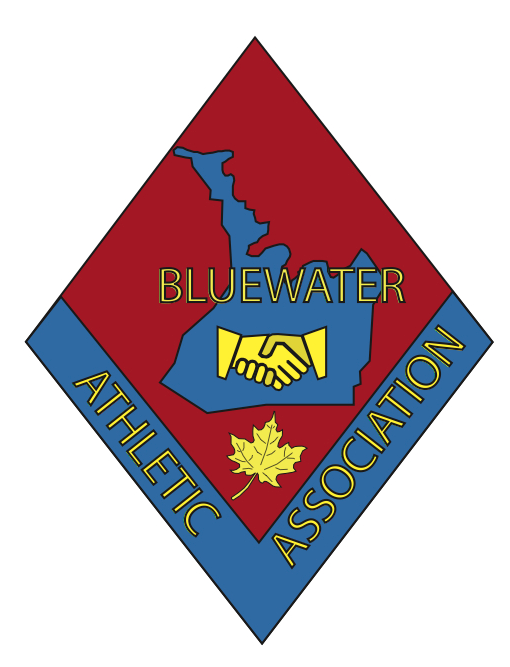
Baa logo

Sports at the secondary level are played through the Bluewater Athletics Association. They are offered at high schools in the BWDSB and the Bruce-Grey Catholic District School Board. The winning team (BAA Champions) will go onto a CWOSSA Tournament. The following sports are played through BAA:

- Volleyball
- Football
- Gymnastics
- Basketball
- Tennis
- Soccer
- Badminton
- Wrestling
- Rugby
- Swim Team
- Cross Country
- Curling
- Hockey
- Golf
- Nordic Skiing
- Track and Field

== Student Senate ==
From each high school in the BWDSB, a representative or student senator goes to monthly meetings at the school board office in Chesley, Ontario and brings ideas and suggestions from their school. They are a part of the Student Senate.

In May 2012, the Student Senate held their first conference, "SOS (Support Our Students) - Voices and Choices" in Owen Sound, Ontario with a focus on student mental health. A sequel titled, "Rumour Has It", followed in May 2013.

== Organization of schools ==
BWDSB schools (grouped by type and school area)
School area	Community, (Note: generally JK-12, except for 4-12 at Georgian Bay) senior (Note: grades 7-12) and secondary (Note: grades 9-12) schools	Primary schools
1	Bruce Peninsula District School, Lion's Head; Grey Highlands Secondary School, Flesherton; Peninsula Shores District School, Wiarton	Amabel-Sauble Community School, Sauble Beach; Beavercrest Community School, Markdale; Bluewater Outdoor Education Centre, Wiarton; Dundalk & Proton Community School, Dundalk; Hepworth Central Public School, Hepworth; Highpoint Community School, Dundalk; Holland-Chatsworth Central School, Chatsworth; Keppel-Sarawak Elementary School, Owen Sound; Macphail Memorial Elementary School, Flesherton; Osprey Central School, Maxwell; St. Edmunds Public School, Tobermory
2	Owen Sound District Secondary School, Owen Sound	Alexandra Community School, Owen Sound; East Ridge Community School, Owen Sound; Hillcrest Elementary School, Owen Sound
3	Georgian Bay Community School, Meaford; John Diefenbaker Senior School, Hanover; Saugeen District Senior School, Port Elgin	Beaver Valley Community School, Thornbury; Dawnview Public School, Hanover; Egremont Community School, Holstien; G.C. Huston Public School, Southampton; Hanover Heights Community School, Hanover; Normanby Community School, Ayton; Northport Elementary School, Port Elgin; Port Elgin-Saugeen Central School, Port Elgin; Spruce Ridge Community School, Durham
4	Kincardine District Senior School, Kincardine; Walkerton District Community School, Walkerton	Arran-Tara Elementary School, Tara; Chesley District Community School, Chesley; Elgin Market Public School, Kincardine; Hillcrest Central School, Teeswater; Huron Heights Public School, Kincardine; Kincardine Township-Tiverton Public School, Kincardine; Lucknow Central Public School, Lucknow; Mildmay-Carrick Central Public School, Mildmay; Paisley Central School, Paisley; Ripley-Huron Community School, Ripley; Sullivan Community School, Desboro

== Fraser Institute rankings ==
The 2020 Fraser Institute report on comparative secondary school rankings in Ontario gives the following data for Bluewater:

Bluewater secondary schools (2020 Fraser Institute Rankings)
Name	Area	Enrollment	1-year ranking of 709	5-year ranking of 630
Bruce Peninsula	1	80	605	n/a
Georgian Bay	3	310	595	336
Grey Highlands	1	610	587	544
John Diefenbaker	3	620	420	373
Kincardine	4	510	614	402
Owen Sound	2	1,190	72	177
Peninsula Shores	1	155	495	377
Saugeen	3	600	72	159
Walkerton	4	395	503	488

== See also ==
- List of school districts in Ontario
- List of high schools in Ontario
