= Kincardine District Senior School =

Location
- 885 River Lane; Kincardine, Ontario, N2Z 2B9; Canada; 44.17689°N 81.62749°W

Information
- School type: High school
- Motto: Virtus, Veritas, Victoria (Excellence, Truth, Success)
- Founded: 1954
- School board: Bluewater District School Board
- Principal: Don Burns
- Grades: 7-12
- Enrollment: 510 (2019/2020)
- Language: English
- Colours: Green & white
- Mascot: Dwight the Knight

Kincardine District Senior School (KDSS) formerly Kincardine & District Secondary School(1951-2019) and Kincardine High School (1876-1951), is a public 7- 12 school in the town of Kincardine, Ontario, Canada. It is one of 11 high schools in the Bluewater District School Board.

Fraser Institute issued the school a 6.6/10. It ranked 294th out of 727 Ontario Secondary Schools and 4th best in the Bluewater District School Board after Chesley District High School, Peninsula Shores District School, and West Hill Secondary School.

The school has almost 700 full-time students in grades 7 through 12. Originally built in 1953/54, it has been expanded with six additions, the last being finished in 1989. The school's colour is green, and its motto is "Virtus, Veritas, Victoria," which means "Excellence, Truth, Success."

== History ==
In Kincardine, as in most pioneer communities, one of the matters of primary consideration was the question of education. The children were at first educated at home, and then, in 1851, a public school opened. The rented frame building was on the river flats near the lake. The teacher, Mrs. Jane Nairn, had 66 students. The original school, Kincardine District High School, was erected in 1876 at the cost of $8,900 when the school opened, 80 students attended at the cost of $8.00 a year for in-town students and $10.00 a year for rural students.

With a new addition in 1901, the school was to be used until 1954. Later the school was moved to a small frame building on the east side of Queen Street opposite Harbor Street. Shortly afterward, it was transferred to the opposite side of the street. The following location was in a log building, which was later the Gentle's property. Then, it moved to Russel Street just west of the Anglican Church.

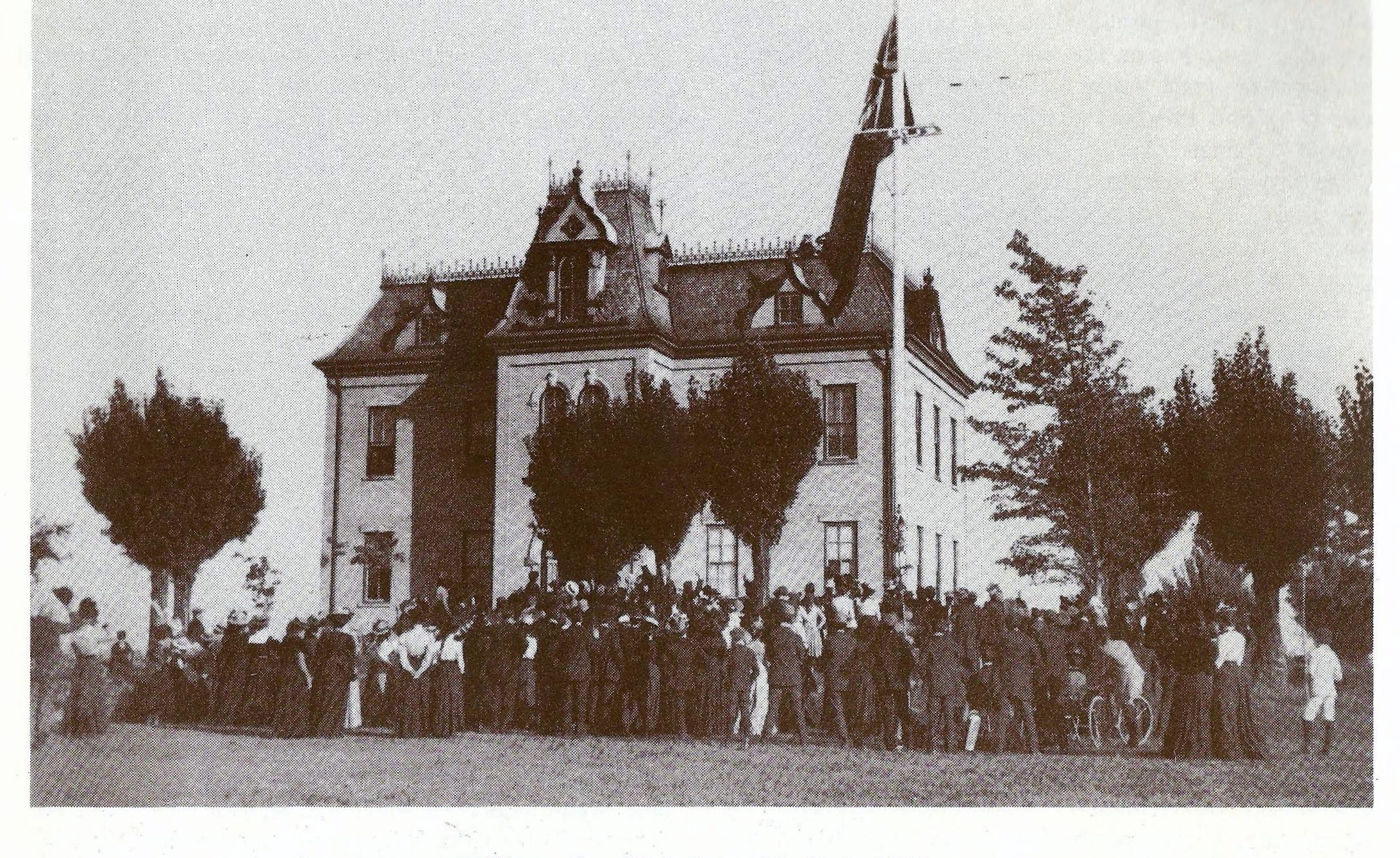
Kincardine High School in 1876

In 1951, Kincardine High School became Kincardine District High School when a bus system was implemented to bring students in from neighbouring communities.

In 1953, construction started on a new one-storey building to include home economics, industrial arts, a cafeteria, and a much better gymnasium facility. The new building opened in 1954 with an enrollment of 244 students and a staff of 10. This new school was 2421.9 m^{2}.

Only five years after the opening of the new school in 1954, two classrooms were added at the north end of the building. By September 1973, seven portable classrooms and a library resource area had been added to the school.

After the renovation in 1974, the school was named Kincardine & District Secondary School.

In 1980, the athletics teams received a new symbol and name. The Kincardine Redmen of the past would now be called the Kincardine Knights.

In 1983, the closing of Ripley Secondary School boosted KDSS's numbers to 799, a new high for the school.

In 1989 KDSS added another addition to the building. The school hasn't had any new additions since 1989. The current school is 7473.4 m^{2} on a site of 5.22ha².

In 2019, KDSS added the grade 7 and 8 wing and was renamed 'Kincardine District Senior School' after public consultation.

On October 29, 2020, the Government of Ontario announced Kincardine will be getting a new high school for grades 7–12.

== Ranking ==
The Fraser Institute issued the school a 6.6/10 and ranked it at 294th out of 727 Ontario Secondary Schools, and as 4th best in the Bluewater District School Board after Chesley District High School, Peninsula Shores District School, and West Hill Secondary School.

== Feeder schools ==
Four main schools feed into KDSS: Huron Heights Public School, Kincardine Township Tiverton Public School, St. Anthony's Catholic School and Ripley Huron Community School (in Ripley, Ontario).

== See also ==
- Education in Ontario
- List of secondary schools in Ontario
