= The Way Love Goes (Jamie Warren song) =

Single by Jamie Warren

from the album Just Not the Same
- Released: 1998
- Genre: Country
- Length: 3:59
- Label: TooHip
- Songwriters: Jamie Warren; Mark Dineen; Jason Barry
- Producer: J. Richard Hutt

Jamie Warren singles chronology
"Cried All the Way Home" (1998)	"The Way Love Goes" (1998)	"She'll Find Someone to Love Her" (1999)

"The Way Love Goes" is a song recorded by Canadian country music artist Jamie Warren. It was released in 1998 as the second single from his second studio album, Just Not the Same. It peaked at number 10 on the RPM Country Tracks chart in November 1998.

== Chart performance ==
Chart (1998)	Peak position
Canada Country Singles (RPM)	10
