= Walkerton, Ontario =

Walkerton
- Incorporated Town
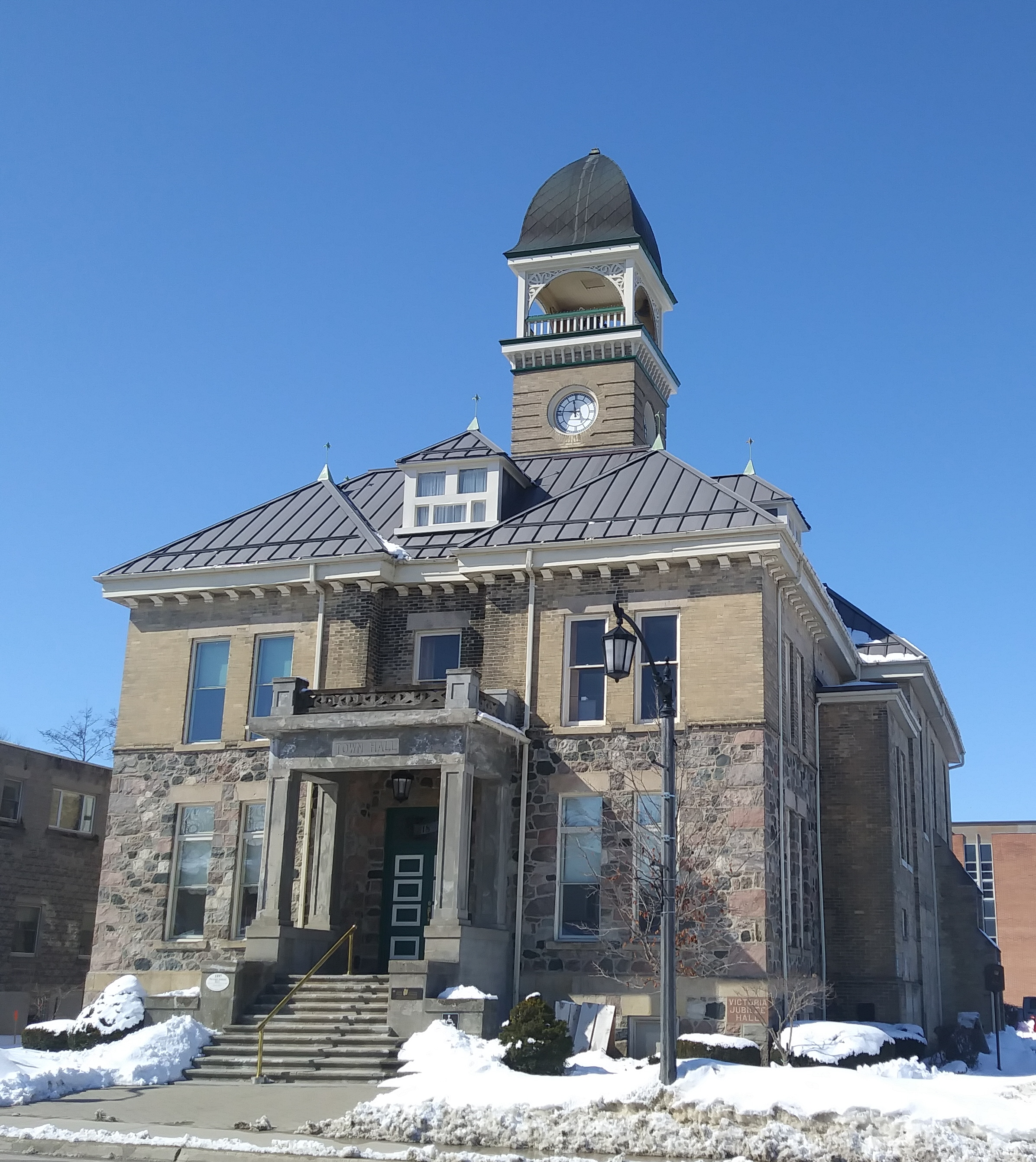
- Town Hall in Walkerton

- Location in southern Ontario
- Coordinates: 44°07′52″N 81°09′02″W
- Country: Canada
- Province: Ontario
- County: Bruce County
- Municipality: Brockton
- Settled: 1849
- Incorporated: 1871
- Dissolved (amalgamated): January 1, 1999

Area
  - Total: 3.90 km^{2} (1.51 sq mi)

Population (2021)
  - Total: 4,724
  - Density: 1,210.8/km^{2} (3,136/sq mi)
- Time zone: UTC-5 (EST)
  - Summer (DST): UTC-4 (EDT)
- Postal code span: N0G
- Area codes: 519, 226

Walkerton is a town in the municipality of Brockton, Bruce County, Ontario, Canada. It is the site of Brockton's municipal offices and is the county seat. Walkerton is located on the Saugeen River, at the junction of Highway 9 and the former Provincial Highway 4 and is 75 kilometres (47 mi) southwest of Owen Sound, 44 kilometres east of Kincardine, 10 kilometres west of Hanover, and 10 kilometres north of Mildmay. As of 2021, the town had 4,724 people in the community.

On January 1, 1999, Walkerton became part of the Municipality of Brockton. The town is notable for the 2000 Walkerton E. coli outbreak.

== History ==
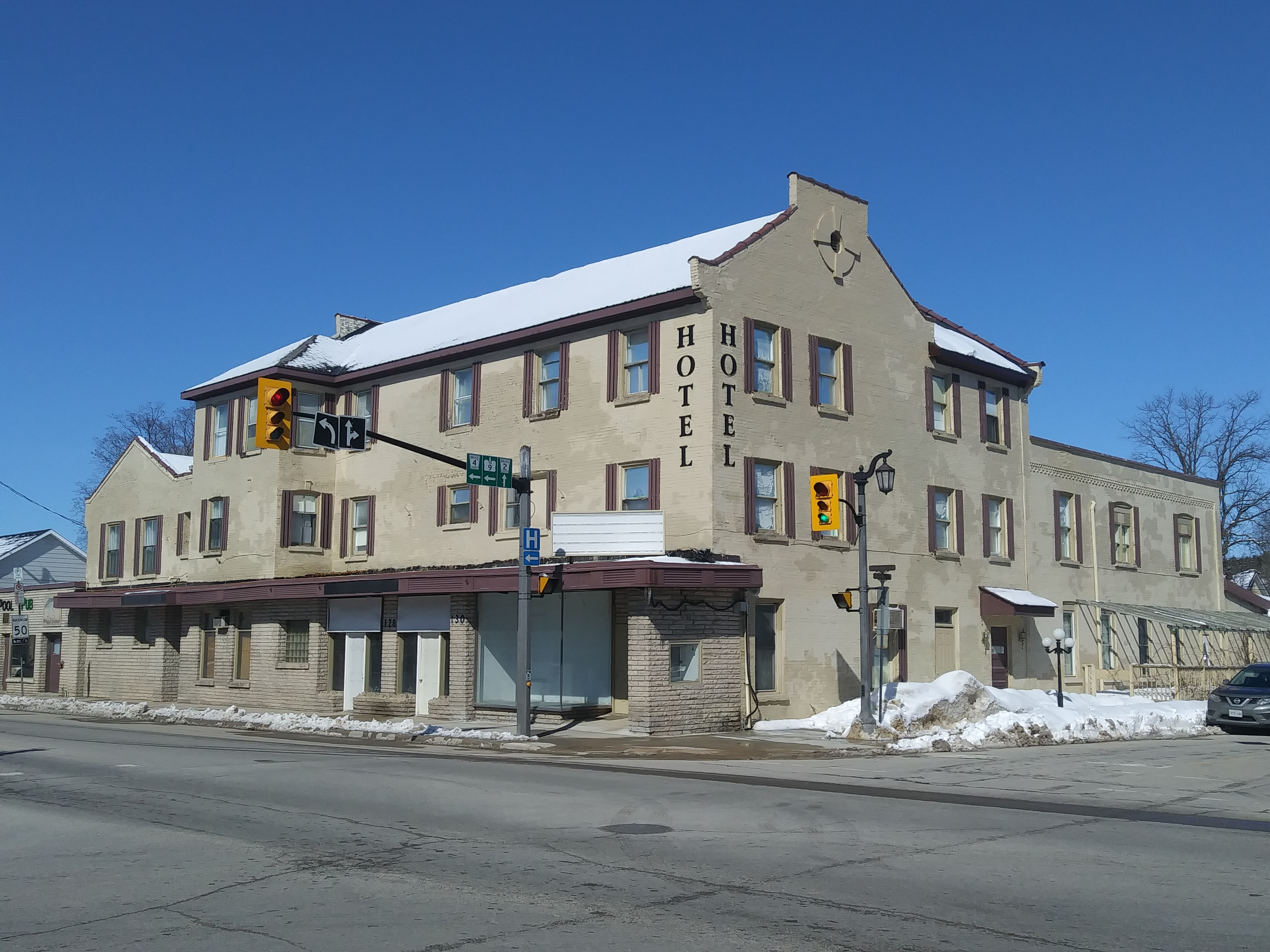
Hartley House Hotel in Walkerton, Ontario

Walkerton was originally part of Brant Township and was first settled in 1849 by William Jasper and Edward Boulton who farmed to the east of the river. Other settlers from the same era included John Lundy, Moses Stewart and Thomas Bilkie who farmed to the west of the river. Joseph Walker arrived from Ireland in 1850 and is considered one of the founders of Walkerton. He built both saw mills and flour mills, surveyed the area into a town plot and encouraged businesses to locate here. Years later, Walker was the reeve of Brant for several terms, and was elected as the first mayor of Walkerton.

Although Walkerton was never incorporated as a village, it became a town in 1871, with a population of just under 1000. That increased to 2,604 by 1881, and to 3,061 by 1891 thanks to the arrival of the railroad which enabled the locals to ship their grain. The population dropped to 2,971 by 1901.

=== 2000 fatal water supply contamination ===
The Walkerton E. coli outbreak was the result of a contamination of the drinking water supply of Walkerton, Ontario, Canada with E. coli and Campylobacter jejuni bacteria. The water supply was contaminated as a result of improper water treatment following heavy rainfall in late April and early May 2000, that had drawn bacteria from the manure of nearby cattle used to fertilize crops into the shallow aquifer of a nearby well. The first reported case was on May 17. The contamination caused gastroenteritis and sickened more than 2,000 people and resulted in seven deaths, and left others with chronic illnesses.

Subsequently, Associate Chief Justice of Ontario, Dennis O'Connor led an inquiry into the outbreak, called the Walkerton Inquiry. Walkerton Public Utilities Commission operators Stan and Frank Koebel, neither of whom had any formal training, were sentenced on December 20, 2004, after pleading guilty to charges of common nuisance stemming from the contamination—Stan to one year in jail, and Frank to nine months house arrest. As a result, stricter water treatment guidelines were put in place by the government.

== Demographics ==
Historical census populations – Walkerton; town (1871–1998), population centre (from 1999)

Year	Pop.	±%
1881	2,604	—
1891	3,061	+17.5%
1901	2,971	−2.9%
1911	2,601	−12.5%
1921	2,344	−9.9%
1931	2,431	+3.7%
1941	2,679	+10.2%
1951	3,264	+21.8%

Year	Pop.	±%
1956	3,698	+13.3%
1961	3,851	+4.1%
1966	4,380	+13.7%
1971	4,479	+2.3%
1976	4,626	+3.3%
1981	4,682	+1.2%
1986	4,725	+0.9%
1991	4,939	+4.5%

Year	Pop.	±%
1996	5,036	+2.0%
2001	4,851	−3.7%
2006	4,905	+1.1%
2011	4,967	+1.3%
2016	4,517	−9.1%
2021	4,724	+4.6%

Population counts are not adjusted for boundary changes.
Source: Statistics Canada

== Media ==
- Walkerton Herald Times - Walkerton's local newspaper, owned by Midwestern Newspapers.
- Cable television is provided by Eastlink TV and Wightman Telecom
- CFBW-FM 91.3 "Bluewater Radio" - Walkerton/Hanover and area local news coverage, weather, and community talk alongside music genres spanning country, blues, bluegrass, oldies (60s–70s), rock, pop, jazz, gospel, folk, Indigenous, and specialty shows
- CKNX-FM 101.7 "The One" - local, regional and national news and adult contemporary music
- CIBU-FM 94.5 "The Bull" - local, regional and national news and classic rock music
- CKNX (AM) 920 - country music

== Bus Transportation ==
- Voyago (buses from Hanover, Ontario) (formerly Kunkel Bus Lines)
- Montgomery Bus Lines (buses from Wingham, Ontario)
- Ross Young Bus Lines (buses from Tiverton, Ontario)

== Sports ==
Walkerton is home to a Junior C hockey team, the Walkerton Capitals, and former home of a Senior A hockey team, the Walkerton Capitals.

== Education ==
Walkerton has two high schools: Walkerton District Community School (K–12), and Sacred Heart High School. Walkerton also has an elementary school, St. Teresa of Calcutta Catholic School.

== Notable people ==
- Tubby Schmalz (1916–1981), Canadian ice hockey administrator, first commissioner of the Ontario Major Junior Hockey League
- Andrew Clyde, U.S. representative for Georgia
- Samuel Lewis Honey, VC, DCM, MM (9 February 1894 – 30 September 1918) was a soldier in the Canadian Expeditionary Force, and posthumous recipient of the Victoria Cross, the highest military award for gallantry in the face of the enemy given to British and Commonwealth forces, during the First World War. Honey was a graduate of Walkerton District High School.
- David Milne, considered to be one of Canada's foremost painters, was a graduate of Walkerton District High School.
- William Bertram (January 19, 1880 – May 1, 1933) Hollywood actor and film director during the silent-film era
- Canadian National softball player and two-time Olympian Alison Bradley was almost a graduate of Walkerton District Secondary School.
- Singer-songwriter Esthero lived in Walkerton.
- Laryssa Biesenthal, Canadian rower
- Matilda Dodge Wilson (October 19, 1883 – September 19, 1967) was born in Walkerton to George and Margaret Rausch (née Glinz). Around 1885, they moved to Detroit. Matilda would marry auto pioneer John Francis Dodge and become one of the wealthiest women in the world after his death. With her second husband, she built the National Historic Landmark Meadow Brook Hall in 1929 and founded Oakland University on her estate.
- Jeannette Durno (1879–1963), pianist and music educator based in Chicago; born in Walkerton

== Trivia ==
The town was rumoured to have been placed in the Guinness World Records for having a church on each corner of the jail and courthouse complex. This is proven, and it has been covered by Ripley's Believe It or Not!.
