= Bruce South =

Bruce South could refer to:

- Bruce South (federal electoral district)
- Bruce South (provincial electoral district)
