= Bruce East =

Former federal electoral district in Ontario, Canada

Ontario electoral district

Defunct federal electoral district
- Legislature: House of Commons
- District created: 1882
- District abolished: 1903
- First contested: 1882
- Last contested: 1904 by-election

Bruce East was a federal electoral district in Ontario, Canada, that was represented in the House of Commons of Canada from 1882 to 1904. This riding was created in 1882 from parts of Bruce North and Bruce South ridings.

The East Riding of the county of Bruce consisted of the townships of Culross, Greenock, Brant and Carrick, the town of Walkerton, and the village of Teeswater.

The electoral district was abolished in 1903 when it was redistributed between Bruce North and Bruce South ridings.

== Members of Parliament ==
This riding has elected the following members of Parliament:

Parliament	Years	Member	Party
Riding created from Bruce North and Bruce South
5th	1882–1887	Rupert Mearse Wells	Liberal
6th	1887–1887	Henry Cargill	Conservative
6th	1887–1891	Henry Cargill	Conservative
7th	1891–1892	Reuben Eldridge Truax	Liberal
7th	1892–1896	Henry Cargill	Conservative
8th	1896–1900	Henry Cargill	Conservative
9th	1900–1903	Henry Cargill	Conservative
9th	1904–1904	James J. Donnelly	Conservative
Riding dissolved into Bruce North and Bruce South

== Election results ==
1882 Canadian federal election
Party	Candidate	Votes
Liberal	Rupert Mearse Wells	1,558
Unknown	Alexander Shaw	1,497

1887 Canadian federal election
Party	Candidate	Votes
Conservative	Henry Cargill	2,182
Liberal	Rupert Mearse Wells	1,812

On Mr. Cargill's resignation, as he was already holding a Crown appointment (postmaster), and on his resignation as postmaster:

By-election on 2 April 1887
Party	Candidate	Votes
Conservative	Henry Cargill	2,009
Liberal	Richard Truax	1,886

1891 Canadian federal election
Party	Candidate	Votes
Liberal	Reuben Eldridge Truax	2,045
Conservative	Henry Cargill	1,931

On Mr. Truax being unseated:

By-election on 11 February 1892
Party	Candidate	Votes
Conservative	Henry Cargill	acclaimed

1896 Canadian federal election
Party	Candidate	Votes
Conservative	Henry Cargill	2,048
Patrons of Industry	James Tolton	1,881

1900 Canadian federal election
Party	Candidate	Votes
Conservative	Henry Cargill	1,806
Liberal	John Coumans	1,763

On Mr. Cargill's death, 1 October 1903:

By-election on 16 February 1904
Party	Candidate	Votes
Conservative	James J. Donnelly	1,821
Liberal	Alexander W. Robb	1,650

== See also ==
- List of Canadian electoral districts
- Historical federal electoral districts of Canada
