= Saugeen Valley Conservation Authority =

- Founded: 1950
- Purpose: Manage the water and other natural resources in the Saugeen River Watershed
- Location: Formosa, Ontario
- Region served: Saugeen River Watershed (Counties of Grey, Bruce, Wellington and Huron)
- Website: www.svca.on.ca

The Saugeen Valley Conservation Authority (SVCA) is a conservation authority in Ontario, Canada. It operates under the Conservation Authorities Act of Ontario. It is a corporate body, through which municipalities, landowners and other organizations work cooperatively to manage the Saugeen River watershed and natural resources within it.

Created in 1950, the SVCA has jurisdiction over 4,675 km^{2}. (1,800 sq. miles) of land in southwestern Ontario, and owns over 8,498 hectares (21,000 acres) of natural areas, including conservation areas and forests.

== History ==
The Saugeen Valley Conservation Authority was created with the intention of responding to problems of flooding on the river, and the effect it had on local communities. One of the first projects of the authority was to build a dyke system around the town of Walkerton to address the problems of flooding in the town.

Over time, land was bought and added to the authority's jurisdiction. Present-day conservation areas were sold or donated to the authority, such as Sulphur Spring Conservation Authority, south of Hanover, which was created in the 1920s by a private landowner, A.J. Metzger, and sold to the SVCA in 1969. In 1973, the Saugeen Valley Conservation Foundation, a non-profit organization, was formed to raise funds for conservation projects in the SVCA. There are 15 member municipalities: Arran-Elderslie, Brockton, Chatsworth, Grey Highlands, Hanover, Howick, Huron-Kinloss, Kincardine, Minto, Morris-Turnberry, Saugeen Shores, South Bruce, Southgate, Wellington North, and West Grey.

In 1996, the Ontario provincial Conservative government of the day cut the Authority's budget by 70%, limiting its ability to monitor water run-off quality. At the same time jobs were cut in the ministry responsible for assuring that water treatment facilities were kept in repair. In 2000, E.-coli in farm runoff leaked into the watershed, contributing to the Walkerton Tragedy. Representatives of the Authority were called to testify at the subsequent inquiry. The budget cuts were among the events found to have led up to the seven deaths. The inquiry led, among other things, to changes in legislation concerning all of the conservation authorities in Ontario.

Today, the authority has taken on additional responsibilities beyond flood management. It manages 15 conservation areas and five campgrounds, monitors wildlife, participates in research contributes data for environmental assessments and provides public education programs available to residents and visitors of conservation lands.

== Conservation areas ==
- Allan Park Management Unit
- Beaverdale Bog
- Bells Lake Management Unit
- Brucedale Conservation Area
- Denny's Dam Conservation Area
- Durham Conservation Area
- Glammis Bog
- Greenock Swamp Complex
- Kinghurst Management Unit
- McBeath Conservation Area
- Moss Lake
- Osprey Wetlands
- Saugeen Bluffs Conservation Area
- Stoney Island Conservation Area
- Sulphur Spring Conservation Area

Camping facilities exist at Brucedale, Denny's Dam, Durham, McBeath, and Saugeen Bluffs Conservation Areas.

== See also ==
- Saugeen River
- Conservation Ontario
- Conservation authority (Ontario, Canada)
