= Reuben Eldridge Truax =

Canadian politician (1847–1935)

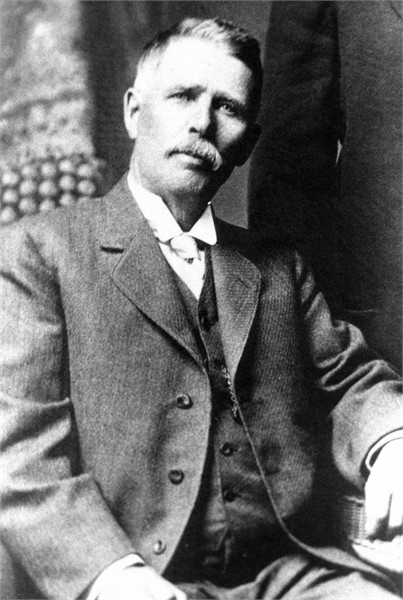

Member of Parliament for Bruce South
- In office 1913–1921
- Preceded by: James J. Donnelly
- Succeeded by: John Walter Findlay

Ontario MPP
- In office 1908–1911
- Preceded by: Robert Edwin Clapp
- Succeeded by: John Anderson
- In office 1894–1904
- Preceded by: Hamilton Parke O'Connor
- Succeeded by: Robert Edwin Clapp
- Constituency: Bruce South

Member of Parliament for Bruce East
- In office 1891–1892
- Preceded by: Henry Cargill
- Succeeded by: Henry Cargill

Personal details
- Born: October 11, 1847 Montreal, Canada East
- Died: April 3, 1935 (aged 87)
- Party: Liberal
- Spouse: Jessie Porteous (m. 1870)
- Occupation: Businessman

Reuben Eldridge Truax (October 11, 1847 – April 3, 1935) was an Ontario businessman and political figure. He represented Bruce South in the Legislative Assembly of Ontario from 1894 to 1904 and from 1908 to 1911 and Bruce East in 1891 and Bruce South from 1913 to 1921 in the House of Commons of Canada as a Liberal member. Truax served four years as reeve and was mayor of Walkerton, Ontario in 1888 and 1889.

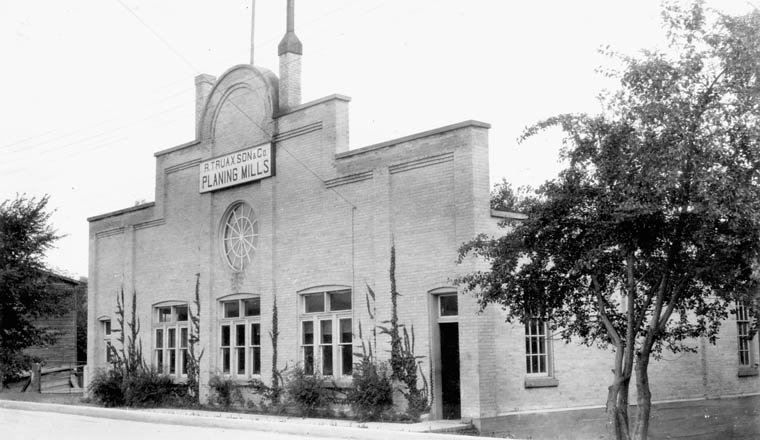
R. Truax & Son & Co.

He was born in Montreal, Canada East in 1847 and educated in Walkerton, Ontario. In 1870, he married Jessie Porteous. He owned a sawmill, planing mill and sash and door factory. He was first elected to the House of Commons in 1891 but that election was declared invalid and Henry Cargill was elected by acclamation in the by-election which followed. Truax was an unsuccessful candidate for the federal seat in Bruce South in 1911 and 1921.
