= James J. Donnelly =

Canadian politician

The Hon. James J. Donnelly

Member of Parliament for Bruce East
- In office February 16, 1904 – December 10, 1904
- Preceded by: Henry Cargill
- Succeeded by: District was abolished in 1903.

Member of Parliament for Bruce South
- In office 1908–1913
- Preceded by: Peter H. McKenzie
- Succeeded by: Reuben Eldridge Truax

Canadian Senator from Ontario
- In office 1913–1948
- Appointed by: Robert Borden

Personal details
- Born: November 14, 1866 Pinkerton, Canada West
- Died: October 20, 1948 (aged 81)
- Party: Conservative
- Committees: Chair, Standing Committee on Agriculture and Forestry (1945); Chair, Standing Committee on Natural Resources (1946-1947)

James J. Donnelly (November 14, 1866 – October 20, 1948), was appointed to the Senate of Canada for life by Prime Minister Robert Laird Borden May 26, 1913, to represent the senatorial division for Bruce South, Ontario. He was the youngest Senator chosen at that time. With more than 40 years of political experience, Senator Donnelly died at the home he built in Pinkerton on October 20, 1948, at the age of 81, approximately one and one half miles from where he was born. His wife died on December 30, 1960, at the age of 89.

== Background ==
James J. Donnelly had the occupation as a lumberman, president/manager, and rancher. Prior to the Canadian Senate, James J. Donnelly was the Reeve and Clerk for the Township of Greenock, Ontario and Warden of Bruce County in 1902. Senator Donnelly bought 2,800 acres (11 km^{2}) and his family ran a lumber mill out of Chepstow. He also raised beef cattle.

In 1895 James J. Donnelly married Julia Mcnab, the daughter of Michael Mcnab and Magdalena Brohman of Chepstow and took over the old homestead from his parents who retired to Kingsbridge. However he soon became interested in the lumbering business and bought a large section of the Greenock Swamp from W. D. Cargill. So he moved with his young family to the nearby village of Pinkerton where in 1904 he built a spacious white brick residence.

Early in life James embarked on a political career. After being elected Reeve of Greenock Township, he was chosen as Warden of Bruce County in 1902. He was defeated in the 1904 federal election in Bruce South but won the riding in the 1908 and 1911 elections.

His eldest son, Frank, followed his father's example of public service and was a Justice of the Supreme Court of Ontario.

Mertis, his second born, was a teacher of mathematics and married William Flannery, a North Bay lawyer in 1932. For her achievements in Community Service during World War II, she was named a member of the Order of the British Empire by George VI in 1946.

== Election results ==
=== Bruce East ===
By-election on 16 February 1904
Party	Candidate	Votes
Conservative	DONNELLY, James J.	1,821
Liberal	ROBB, Alexander W.	1,650

=== Bruce South ===
1904 Canadian federal election
Party	Candidate	Votes
Liberal	MCKENZIE, Peter H.	3,082
Conservative	DONNELLY, James J.	2,938

1908 Canadian federal election
Party	Candidate	Votes
Conservative	DONNELLY, James J.	3,005
Liberal	MCKENZIE, Peter H.	2,812

1911 Canadian federal election
Party	Candidate	Votes
Conservative	DONNELLY, James J.	2,878
Liberal	TRUAX, R.E.	2,775

Mr. J.J. Donnelly summoned to the Senate, 26 May 1913:
