= Walter Allan Hall =

Canadian politician

Member of Parliament for Bruce South
- In office October 1925 – October 1935
- Preceded by: John Walter Findlay
- Succeeded by: riding dissolved

Personal details
- Born: Walter Allan Hall; 24 August 1867 Cromarty, Ontario, Canada
- Died: 4 August 1944 (aged 76)
- Party: Liberal
- Spouse(s): Clara E. Bartleman m. 16 October 1896
- Profession: physician

Walter Allan Hall (24 August 1867 – 4 August 1944) was a Liberal party member of the House of Commons of Canada. He was born in Cromarty, Ontario and became a physician.

Hall attended public school at Salem, Ontario, secondary school at Walkerton then Queen's University where he attained a Bachelor of Arts degree with specialist English, Mathematics and Science designations. He was a schoolteacher at Aurora, Ontario and at Kingston Collegiate Instituted before beginning medical studies. After earning medical (MDCM) degrees, Hall became the staff physician and surgeon of Bruce County's House of Refuge for 31 years, and also served as a county jail doctor for 17 years.

He was first elected to Parliament at the Bruce South riding in the 1925 general election then re-elected in 1926 and 1930. With riding boundary changes, Hall was a candidate at the newly formed Grey—Bruce riding, but was defeated in the 1935 election by Agnes MacPhail of the United Farmers-Labour party.
