= Robert Edwin Clapp =

Canadian politician

Ontario MPP
- In office 1905–1908
- Preceded by: Reuben Eldridge Truax
- Succeeded by: Reuben Eldridge Truax
- Constituency: Bruce South

Personal details
- Born: February 12, 1855
- Party: Conservative
- Spouse: Zillah Davis (m. 1886)
- Occupation: Physician

Robert Edwin Clapp (February 12, 1855 – 1944) was an Ontario physician and political figure. He represented Bruce South in the Legislative Assembly of Ontario from 1905 to 1908 as a Conservative member.

The son of Philip Clapp and Nancy Kelly, he was born in Milford and was educated in Milford, Seaforth and Harriston. Clapp went on to study medicine in Toronto and continued his studies in Vienna, Berlin and Leipzig. He set up practice in Mildmay in Bruce County. Clapp served as reeve for Carrick Township in 1898 and 1899. He married Zillah Davis in 1886.

Clapp ran unsuccessfully for a seat in the provincial assembly in 1902, losing to Reuben Truax, before being elected in 1905.
