= SVCA =

SVCA may refer to:

- Simi Valley, California, a city in California and the United States
- Saugeen Valley Conservation Authority, Canadian Conservation authority
