= Greenock Swamp =

Forested wetland in Ontario, Canada

Coordinates: 44.1667°N 81.2833°W

The Greenock Swamp is a large, forested wetland in southern Bruce County, Ontario, Canada. At approximately 8,300 hectares (20,500 acres), it is the largest forested wetland in southern Ontario. It was designated a provincially significant Area of Natural and Scientific Interest (ANSI) in 1983 and classified as a Class 1 wetland, the highest provincial ranking, in 1989.

== Geography and hydrology ==
The Greenock Swamp lies primarily within the former Greenock Township (now the Municipality of Brockton) with portions extending into the municipalities of South Bruce, Huron-Kinloss and Kincardine. The swamp was formed by the natural damming of the Teeswater River, which flows the full length of the former Greenock Township from south to north. The bedrock underlying the area is limestone, partly dolomite. Much of the area is a single wetland plain with muck soil, though numerous upland “islands” occur on moraines, both surrounded by wetland and along the perimeter.

The Teeswater River flows through two stretches of the swamp along its eastern fringe, and the entire area drains into this river. The swamp contains ten lakes, including Schmidt Lake, Cunningham Lake, Otter Lake, Bester Lake, McGlinn Lake, and Hodgins Lake. The wetland functions as a major water storage area, acting as a giant sponge that releases water during periods of drought and absorbs water during heavy rainfall, helping to minimize flooding downstream on the Teeswater River.

== Ecology ==
=== Vegetation ===
The overwhelming majority of the wetland area supports swamp or lowland forest, predominantly lowland deciduous forest dominated by silver maple, red maple, and red ash, with yellow birch as a subdominant species. Mixed swamp forest, dominated by eastern white cedar and red maple, also occurs. Approximately 96% of the ANSI is lowland deciduous forest, mixed swamp forest, upland forest, or upland mixed forest.

Other vegetation communities include lake vegetation (occurring in ten lakes, with white water lily and bull-head yellow water lily as the most common species), unwooded vegetation mats adjacent to lakes and watercourses (generally quaking mats dominated by cattails, sedges, and swamp loosestrife), and one non-quaking fen in the northeast portion dominated by sedges and red osier dogwood.

Upland areas support mainly deciduous forest dominated by sugar maple and black cherry, with red maple and white ash as subdominants. Small areas of conifer plantation (eastern white pine and white spruce) and old clearings also occur.

=== Flora ===
Approximately 680 species of vascular plants have been documented in the swamp, possibly the greatest diversity of any ANSI in Grey and Bruce Counties. Eight provincially rare native vascular plants have been found, including Hill's pondweed (Potamogeton hillii), rigid sedge (Carex tetanica), beaked spike-rush (Eleocharis rostellata), arrow arum (Peltandra virginica), large round-leaved orchid (Platanthera orbiculata var. macrophylla), green violet (Hybanthus concolor), ginseng (Panax quinquefolium), and Oswego tea (Monarda didyma). Six of these species are nationally rare, and ginseng is listed under the Convention on International Trade in Endangered Species.

The swamp supports 22 species of orchids and four species of trillium. Other notable plants include carnivorous species such as purple pitcher plant and sundews, as well as southern shrubs such as blue-beech and spicebush that are abundant through the soft maple swamp forest. Seventy-one additional native non-weed vascular species rare in southern Bruce County have also been documented.

=== Fauna ===
Almost 1,000 species of biota (exclusive of non-resident birds and butterflies) have been documented in the swamp. There is a good diversity of vertebrates, including 20 fish species and over 100 bird species. Eleven species of hawks, owls, and vultures have been observed with breeding evidence, including 6 to 10 Barred Owl territories, a notable population for southwestern Ontario. Four provincially rare breeding birds have been confirmed: Cooper's Hawk, Red-shouldered Hawk, American Coot, and Cerulean Warbler. The two hawk species are considered vulnerable in Canada. Two other rare breeders in Grey and Bruce Counties—Common Moorhen and Blue-winged Warbler—have also been found with breeding evidence.

Mammal species observed include river otter, muskrat, raccoon, beaver, mink, and white-tailed deer, which use the swamp for winter cover. The wetland serves as a stopover and nesting site for waterfowl, including Hooded Merganser, Pied-billed Grebe, and Wood Duck, and provides spawning habitat for fish. Great Blue Heron nesting colonies and Bald Eagles have also been documented.

== History ==
=== Indigenous ===
The Greenock Swamp lies within the traditional territory of the Saugeen Ojibway Nation, which comprises the Saugeen First Nation and the Chippewas of Nawash Unceded First Nation. The Teeswater River, flowing through the eastern side of the swamp, was known in Ojibwe as "ah-ta-yahko-sibbi" or “the drowned lands river”. The swamp was a source of game, berries and medicinal plants. The lands were ceded through the 1836 Saugeen Tract Agreement.

=== Survey and early settlement ===
The area was surveyed by Allan Park Brough in 1848, who was directed to lay out a road straight from Durham to Lake Huron. Brough found the swamp to be “almost continuous” and estimated its extent at “more than 25,000 acres.” The road was forced to jog around the swamp, and this deviation remains to this day.

Greenock Township was named after the town of Greenock, Scotland. The township's first post office opened in 1852. Early settlers viewed the swamp as a drawback to agricultural development, but its industrial value soon became apparent. The first mill on the Teeswater River was built by John Valentine at Paisley in 1852, followed by mills at Pinkerton, Cargill, Chepstow, and Riversdale.

=== Lumber industry ===
The turning point in the swamp's history came in October 1871, when the Commissioner of Crown Lands sold 8,417 acres of Greenock swamp lands at auction at the Walkerton Court House. The average price was $4.66 per acre. Major purchasers included Charles Mickle Sr. and Henry Cargill.

Henry Cargill (1838–1903), a lumberman and entrepreneur from Nassagaweya Township in Halton County, eventually consolidated ownership of nearly all the swamp lands. After purchasing Mickle's mill property and approximately 4,100 acres of timbered lands in January 1879, Cargill controlled virtually the entire Greenock Swamp. The swamp contained vast stands of white pine, cedar, ash, soft maple, elm, beech, and maple hardwoods.

Cargill's enterprise became the largest employer in Bruce County, with over 300 men working in his sawmills, planing mills, and related operations at the height of production. His workers constructed two hand-dug canals totalling approximately 7 kilometres, which lowered the water level of the swamp by about one metre to facilitate log extraction. In 1916, his son Wellington David Cargill built a logging “dinky” train to transport some of the remaining logs from the swamp to the mills. The village that grew around the mills was initially called “Yokassippi” (a corruption of the Ojibwe name for the Teeswater river, at-ta-yahko-sibbi) before being renamed Cargill in 1882.

The white pine from the Greenock Swamp was highly valued for ship masts due to its strength and straightness. By the early 20th century, accessible timber had been largely harvested.

=== Prohibition era ===
During the Prohibition era in Ontario (1916–1927) and continuing into the 1930s, the swamp's remoteness made it an attractive location for illegal whiskey production. The term “swamp whisky” became associated with the area. Local residents, many of Irish and German descent with traditions of distilling, operated stills hidden in the swamp's interior. The sole Ontario Provincial Police officer for Bruce County during this period, Constable Otto McClevis (appointed in 1928), spent much of his time searching for illegal stills.

The Cargill and Pinkerton Hotels became famous for serving swamp whisky, attracting customers from across the region. Various code words were used to order the product: “wizard oil” in Port Elgin, “raspberry” in Walkerton, “a little bung starter” in Kincardine, and “clucking chicken” at the Pinkerton Hotel. In 1924, provincial officers discovered one of the largest stills in the province on a Greenock Swamp property in Culross Township—a 25-foot-long, 8-foot-wide, 7-foot-high excavation reinforced in concrete, capable of producing 25 gallons of liquor per day.

=== Conservation ===
The Ontario Ministry of Natural Resources selected the Greenock Swamp as a life science Candidate Nature Reserve in 1982 and identified it as a provincially significant Area of Natural and Scientific Interest (ANSI) in 1983. In 1989, the wetland was classified as a Class 1 wetland, the highest provincial ranking.

The Saugeen Valley Conservation Authority (SVCA) designated the Greenock Swamp as a project area under its wetland conservation programme in 1973, passing a motion to adopt land acquisition in the swamp as an Authority project. By 1980, the SVCA had acquired approximately 4,700 acres (23% of the total area). Today, the SVCA owns the majority of the wetland, with Bruce County Forest owning approximately 1% and the remainder in private ownership.

== Recreation and access ==
Public access to the Greenock Swamp is available at Schmidt Lake, located on the eastern edge of the swamp west of the village of Cargill. The Schmidt Lake Conservation Area, managed by the Saugeen Valley Conservation Authority, offers over 7 kilometres of trails, a floating boardwalk through the bog mat, and a viewing platform with interpretive signage. The trails are used for hiking in summer and cross-country skiing and snowshoeing in winter.

The Cargill and Greenock Swamp Visitor Centre and Museum, located in the village of Cargill, tells the story of Henry Cargill's logging operations and the development of the region.

== See also ==
- Areas of Natural and Scientific Interest
- Cargill, Ontario
- Henry Cargill
- Bruce County
- Saugeen Valley Conservation Authority
