= Waterloo Brewing Company =

Canadian Brewing Company

Waterloo Brewing LTD.
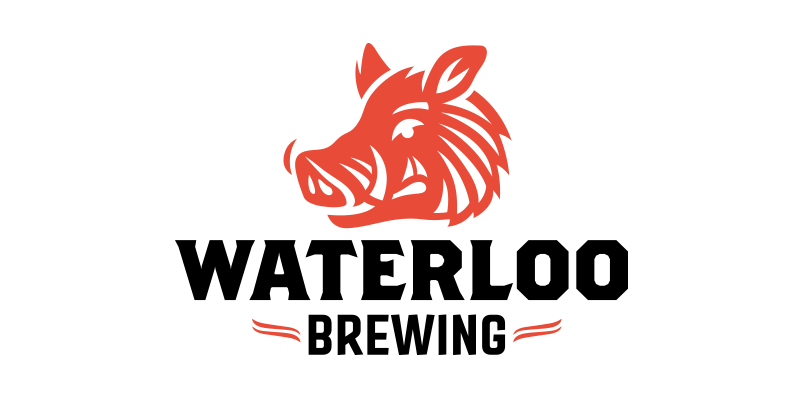
- Formerly: Brick Brewing Company
- Industry: Alcoholic drink
- Founded: 1984; 42 years ago
- Founder: Jim Brickman
- Headquarters: 400 Bingemans Centre Drive; Kitchener, Ontario; N2B 3X9
- Products: Beer
- Owner: Carlsberg Canada Inc. (2023–present)
- Parent: Carlsberg Group (2023–present)
- Website: waterloobrewing.com

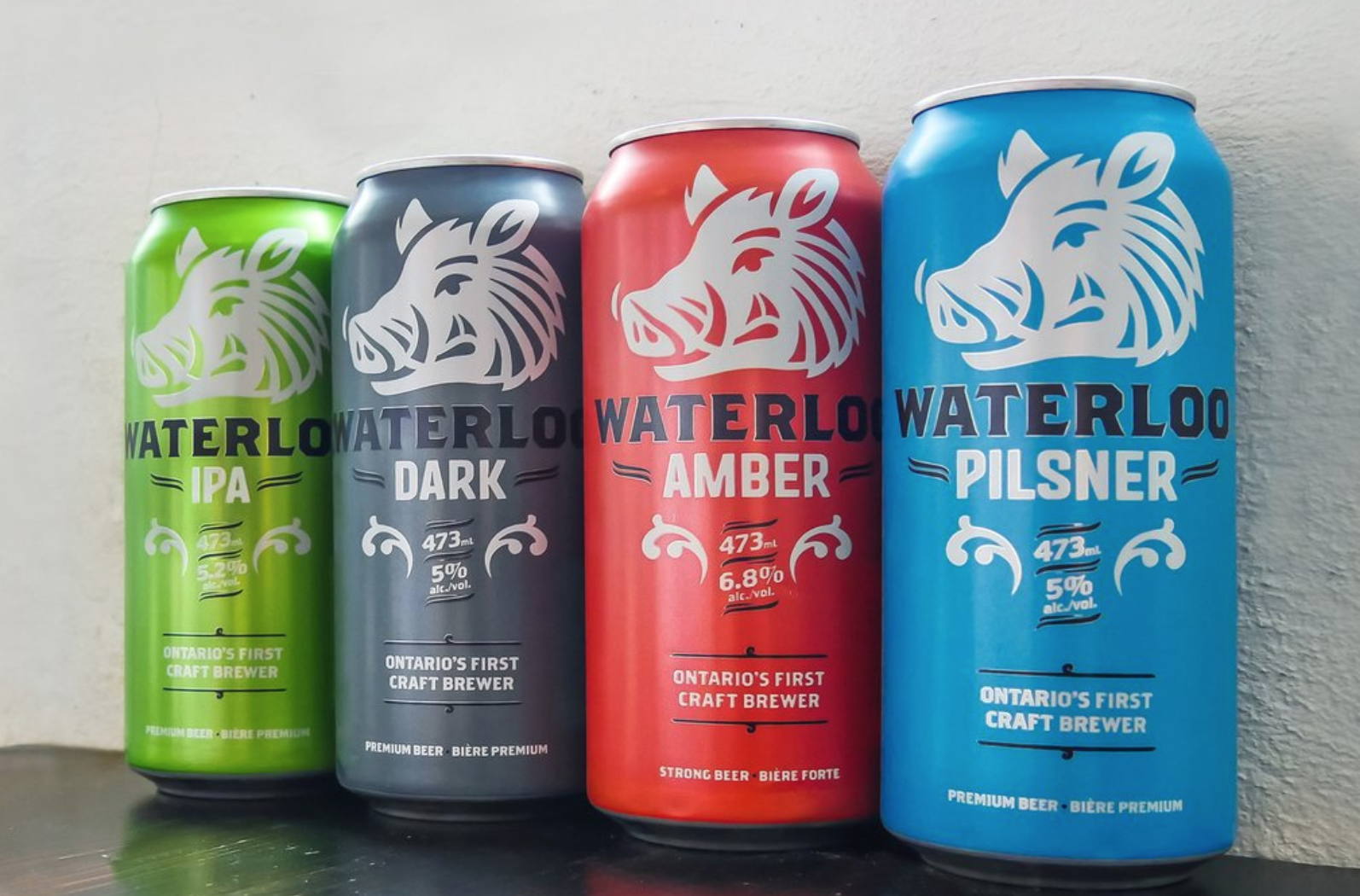
Cans of Waterloo beer

Waterloo Brewing LTD. (formerly the Brick Brewing Co.) is a brewery based in Kitchener, Ontario, Canada, with several divisions. The company is reportedly the largest Canadian-owned brewer in the province, and it was also Ontario's first modern craft brewery.

Waterloo's most successful brand is the Laker series. It also operates LandShark Lager Canada and Waterloo Brewing; the latter is their craft brewing division. In mid-2019, the company announced that it would change the corporate name from Brick to Waterloo Brewing Ltd.

In December 2022, the company announced that it was being acquired by Carlsberg Group. On March 7, 2023, Carlsberg completed the acquisition of Waterloo Brewing through its Canadian subsidiary.

== Overview ==
The company's administration currently consists of president and CEO George Croft and COO Russell Tabata. Founder Jim Brickman resigned in 2008.

In the early 1990s, Waterloo briefly produced Pride Lager, Canada's first beer marketed specifically to gay consumers. Pride Lager was not a new product, however, but simply one of the company's existing brews bottled and sold under an alternate label.

In January 2017, Waterloo put its Formosa Springs Brewery in Formosa, Ontario, up for sale; that resulted in the re-opening of the 40,000 square foot plant after the new owner was interested in retaining the facility. In addition to the Formosa brand, Waterloo also sold the Red Baron lines.

Waterloo planned to consolidate its operations in Kitchener and expand the plant, at an estimated cost of $4 million.

In late 2018, the company announced a plan to invest $9.6 million in a tasting room, small-batch brewhouse, expanded warehouse and production facility and an expanded retail store at its Bingemans Centre Drive operation. This is said to bring its investment to nearly $30 million CAD in five years.

After all of the projects are completed, the company's investment over the previous six years will have totaled about $45 million.

== Waterloo Brewing brands ==
- Waterloo Craft Lager
- Waterloo Amber
- Waterloo Dark
- Waterloo IPA
- Waterloo Grapefruit Radler
- Waterloo Raspberry Radler
- Seasonal/limited beers: Waterloo Double Double Doppelbock; Waterloo Salted Caramel Porter; Waterloo Pineapple Radler; Waterloo Citrus Radler; Waterloo Vanilla Porter

== Laker family of brands ==
- Laker Lager
- Laker Light
- Laker Ice
- Laker Red
- Laker Strong

== Other products ==
- Landshark Lager
- Seagram Craft Cider
- Seagram Wildberry Vodka Cooler
- Seagram Island Time Anytime
- Seagram Island Time Tiki Mule
- Red Cap Ale

== See also ==
- Beer in Canada
