= John Anderson (Ontario politician) =

Canadian politician from Ontario

Member of the Ontario Provincial Parliament for Bruce South
- In office December 11, 1911 – May 29, 1914
- Preceded by: Reuben Eldridge Truax
- Succeeded by: Wellington David Cargill

Personal details
- Party: Liberal

John George Anderson was a Canadian politician from Ontario. He represented Bruce South in the Legislative Assembly of Ontario from 1911 to 1914.

== See also ==
- 13th Parliament of Ontario
