= Salem, South Bruce, Ontario =

Salem
- Dispersed Rural Community
- Location in southern Ontario
- Coordinates: 44°03′16″N 81°18′04″W
- Country: Canada
- Province: Ontario
- County: Bruce
- Municipality: South Bruce
- Elevation: 283 m (928 ft)
- Time zone: UTC-5 (Eastern Time Zone)
  - Summer (DST): UTC-4 (Eastern Time Zone)
- Postal Code: N0G 2S0
- Area codes: 519, 226, 548

Salem is a Dispersed Rural Community and unincorporated place in the municipality of South Bruce, Bruce County in southwestern Ontario, Canada. The community is in geographic Culross Township at the intersection of Bruce County Road 4 and Concession Road 12, 6 kilometres (3.7 mi) north of the community of Teeswater and 7 kilometres (4.3 mi) west of the community of Formosa, and is the location of a United Church built in 1872.
