= Malcolm Alex McCallum =

Canadian politician from Ontario

Member of the Ontario Provincial Parliament for Bruce South
- In office June 25, 1923 – September 17, 1929
- Preceded by: Frank Rennie
- Succeeded by: Foster Graham Moffatt

Personal details
- Party: Progressive

Malcolm Alex McCallum was a Canadian politician from the Progressive Party of Canada. He represented Bruce South in the Legislative Assembly of Ontario from 1923 to 1929. In 1929 his election was voided and he was succeeded by Conservative Foster Graham Moffatt.

== See also ==
- 16th Parliament of Ontario
- 17th Parliament of Ontario
