= Peter H. McKenzie =

Canadian politician

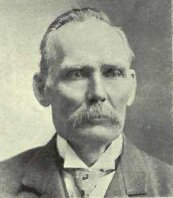

Member of the Canadian Parliament for Bruce South
- In office 1904–1908
- Preceded by: New district
- Succeeded by: James J. Donnelly

Personal details
- Born: April 14, 1845 Puslinch Township, Canada West
- Died: June 13, 1929 (aged 84)
- Party: Liberal

Peter H. McKenzie (April 14, 1845 – June 13, 1929) was a Canadian politician.

Born in Puslinch Township, Wellington County, Canada West, the son of Alexander McKenzie of Ross-shire, Scotland, and Jane McNaughton, of Stirlingshire, Scotland, McKenzie was educated at the Common School in Puslinch. A farmer, McKenzie was a Liberal candidate for Bruce West in 1896, but he was defeated. He was a township and County Councillor in Bruce County. He was President of the Lucknow Agricultural Society and the South Bruce Farmers Institute. He was first elected to the House of Commons of Canada for Bruce South at the general elections of 1904. He was defeated in 1908.

== Electoral record ==
1904 Canadian federal election: Bruce South
Party	Candidate	Votes
Liberal	Peter H. McKenzie	3,082
Conservative	James J. Donnelly	2,938

1908 Canadian federal election: Bruce South
Party	Candidate	Votes
Conservative	James J. Donnelly	3,005
Liberal	Peter H. McKenzie	2,812
