= Cargill, Ontario =

Cargill
- Hamlet
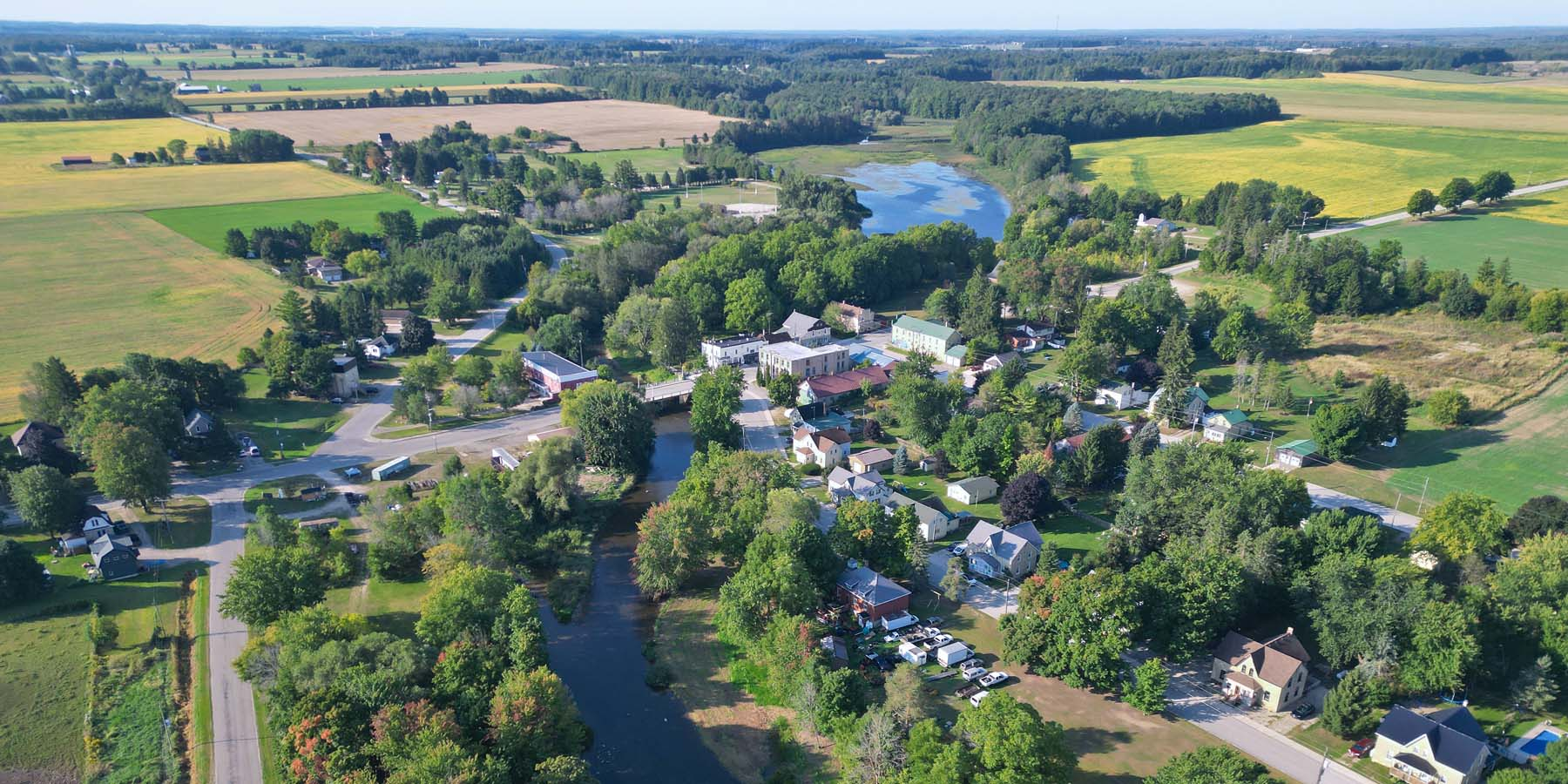
- Aerial view of Cargill from the northeast
- Interactive map of Cargill
- Country: Canada
- Province: Ontario
- County: Bruce County
- Municipality: Brockton
- Named for: Henry Cargill

Government
  - Mayor: Chris Peabody

Population
  - Hamlet: 250
  - Rural: 900
- Time zone: Eastern Standard Time
- Postal code: N0G 1J0

Cargill is a community in the Municipality of Brockton, Bruce County, Ontario, Canada. Located along the Teeswater River near the Greenock Swamp, it was founded in the late 19th century and named after industrialist and politician Henry Cargill, who transformed it into one of the most prosperous villages in the region at the time.

== History, founding and early development ==
The area was first settled in the mid-19th century as Mickle’s Station, a small settlement east of the Greenock Swamp. In 1873, the Wellington, Grey and Bruce Railway established a station there, and in 1882 the Grand Trunk Railway renamed the station Cargill in recognition of Henry Cargill’s role in developing the village.

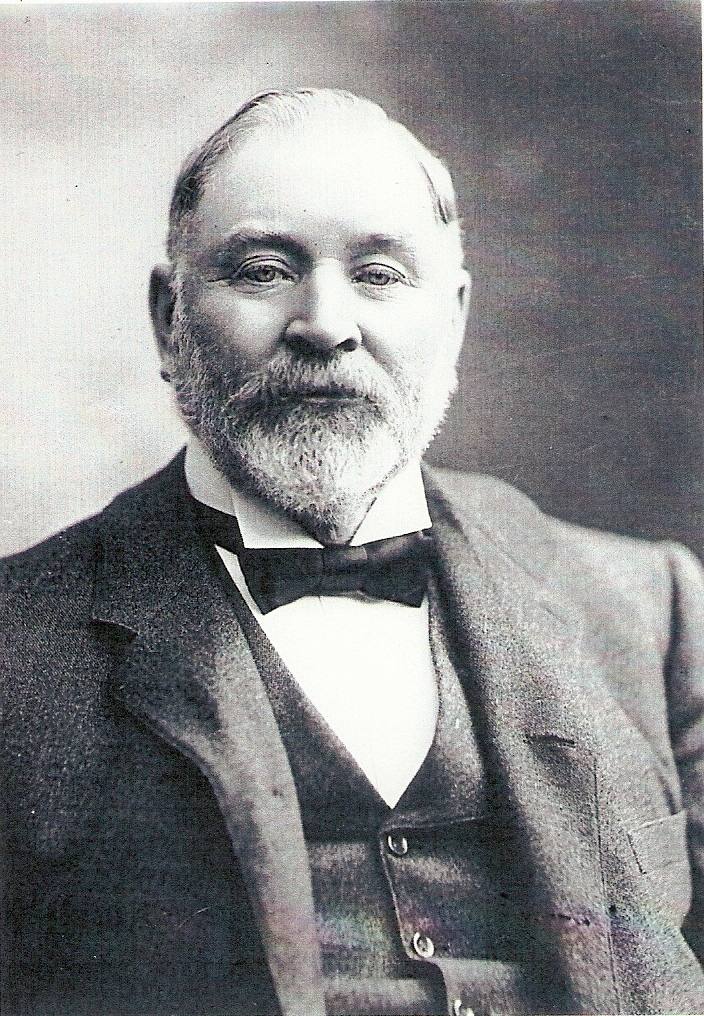
Henry Cargill

Cargill, a lumberman and entrepreneur originally from Nassagaweya Township, purchased land in and around the Greenock Swamp in the 1870s. By draining portions of the swamp and cutting logs in the winter, he accessed vast stands of white pine and other hardwoods, which he processed in sawmills and planing mills he built in Cargill. At its height, his enterprise employed over 300 men, making him the largest employer in Bruce County.

== Growth of the village ==
Under Henry Cargill’s direction, the village rapidly expanded. He established stores, a post office (becoming the first postmaster), library, community hall and numerous businesses including a blacksmith shop and general store. By the 1880s, Cargill had become one of the first villages in the region with electricity, generated from Cargill’s own turbine-powered dam on the river.

The population reached about 200 by 1885, and the Farmer’s Advocate and Home Magazine described Cargill as “one of the most prosperous in the Province”. Workers’ housing was also constructed, many of which remain today as yellow brick homes built for foremen and mill employees.

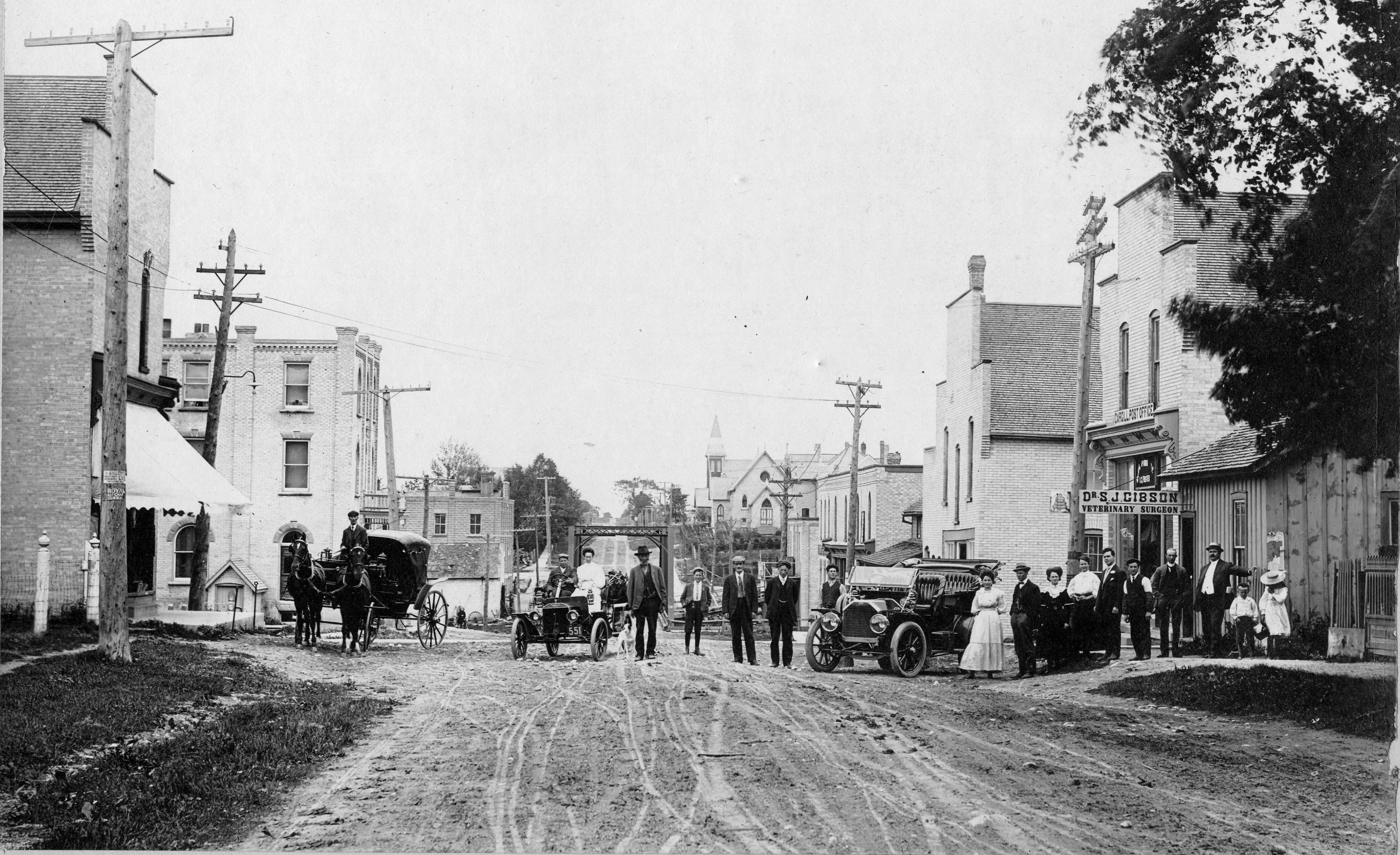
Cargill Main Street

Churches, schools, and community life

Henry Cargill also financed schools and churches for the community. In 1880, he built a frame building that served as the community's first church and school. By 1902, three permanent churches — Methodist, Presbyterian, and Anglican — were established, the latter funded largely by Cargill despite his Presbyterian faith. St. Joseph's Catholic Church was established in 1924.

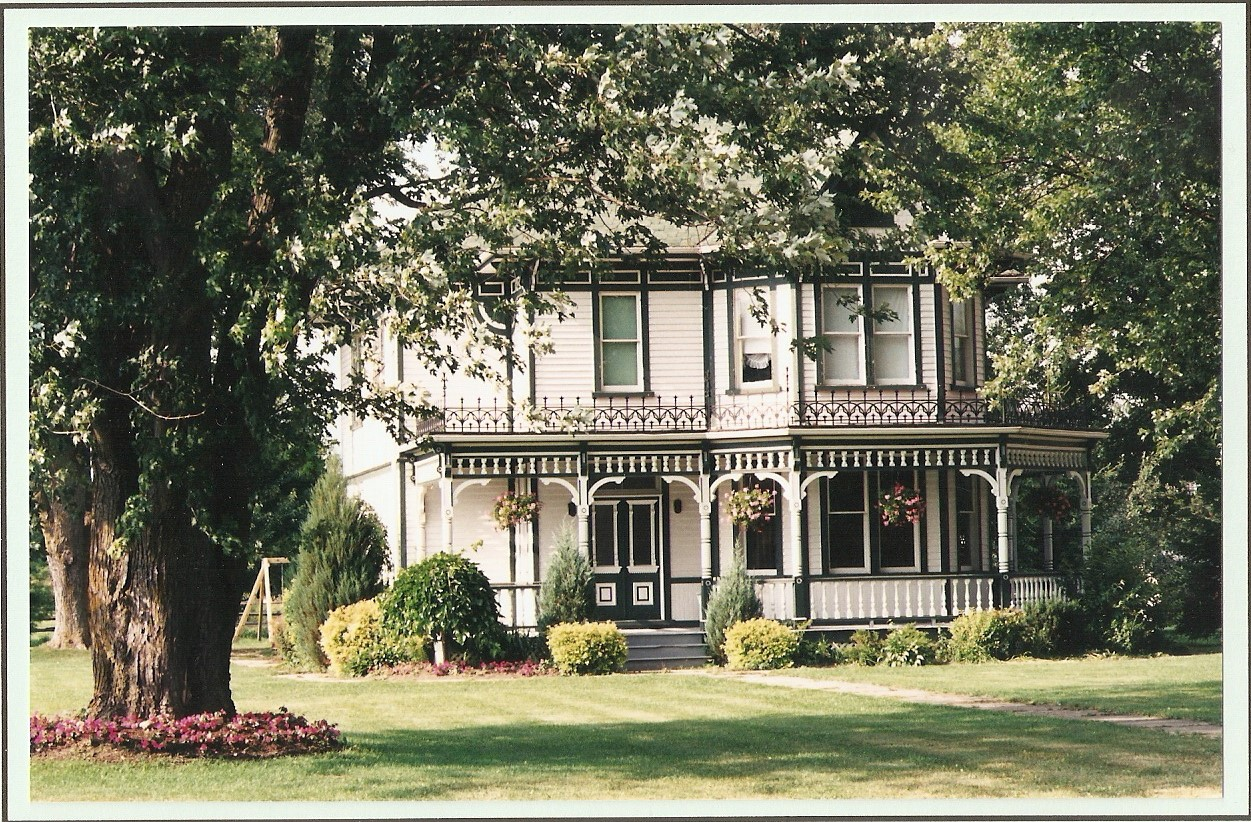
Cargill "White House"

The Cargill family residence, known as the “Red House,” was a landmark in the community until it was destroyed by fire in 1919. The original Cargill family residence, known as the "White House" still remains as a registered heritage building.

== Economy ==
In its early years, the economy of Cargill was dominated by lumbering, milling, and agriculture. Cargill also bred shorthorn cattle and race horses and built what was then the largest barn in Bruce County to house his livestock.

After the decline of the lumber industry, Cargill evolved into a farming community, supported by the Cargill Community Centre, erected on the site of Cargill's former lumber mills. Later, tourism and heritage preservation became part of the local economy, supported by the Cargill Visitor Centre and Museum, The Mill Pond Gallery and Cafe, The Bruce County Bookstore and events such as community homecomings.

== Notable events ==
1879: Henry Cargill begins logging white pine and other old growth trees in the Greenock Swamp.

1916: Henry Cargill's son, Wellington David Cargill, builds a logging "dinky" train to transport logs from the Greenock Swamp to mills in Cargill.

1924 fire: A major fire destroyed a business block including the Royal Bank.

1930s: The Great Depression and Prohibition make the Greenock Swamp an attractive location for locals distilling bootleg whisky.

1934 bank robbery: The first bank robbery in Bruce County.

1948 fire: The Cargill Public School was destroyed along with its records.

1957 fire: Cargill’s large barn, the largest in Bruce County, was destroyed.

== Cargill today ==
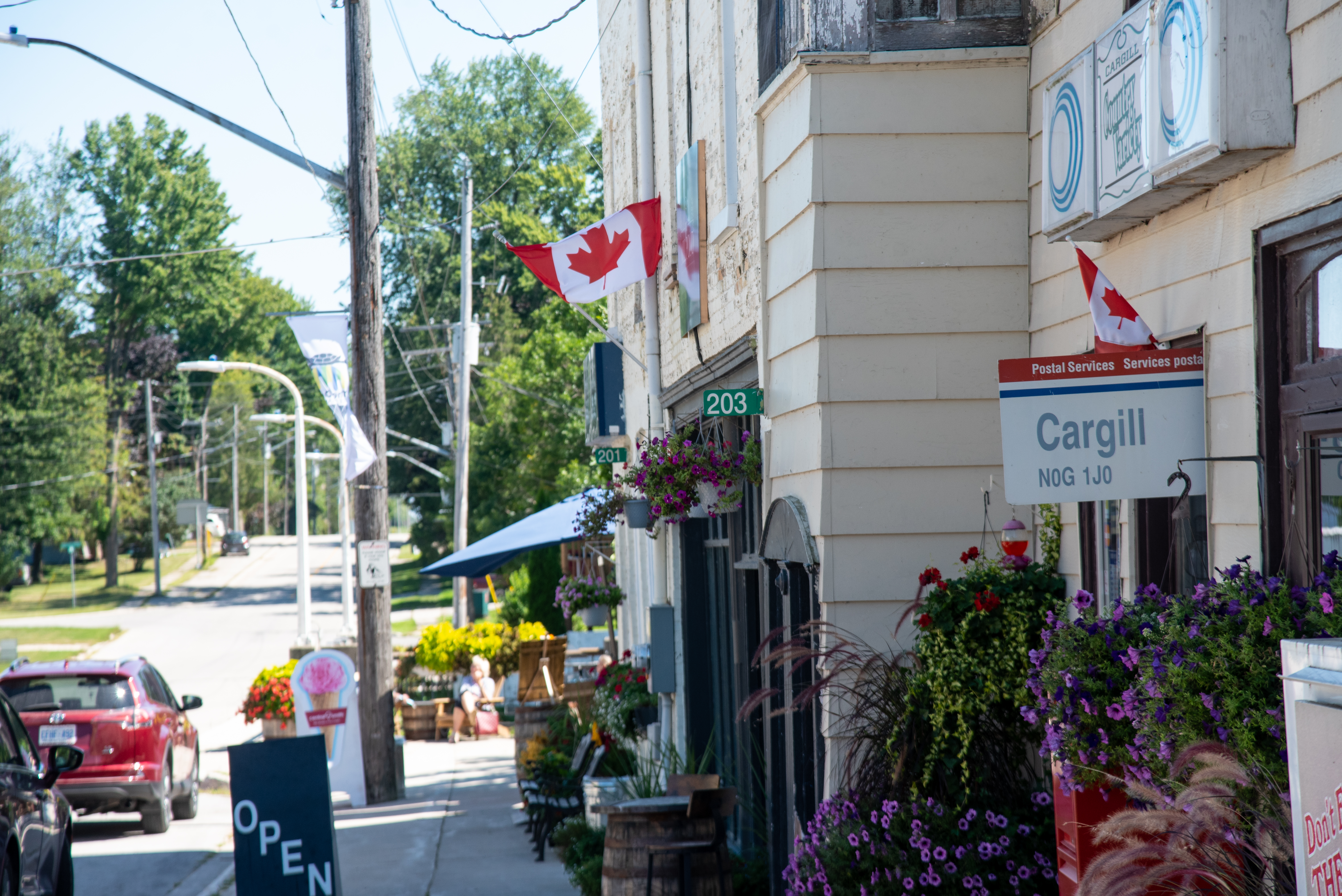
Downtown Cargill

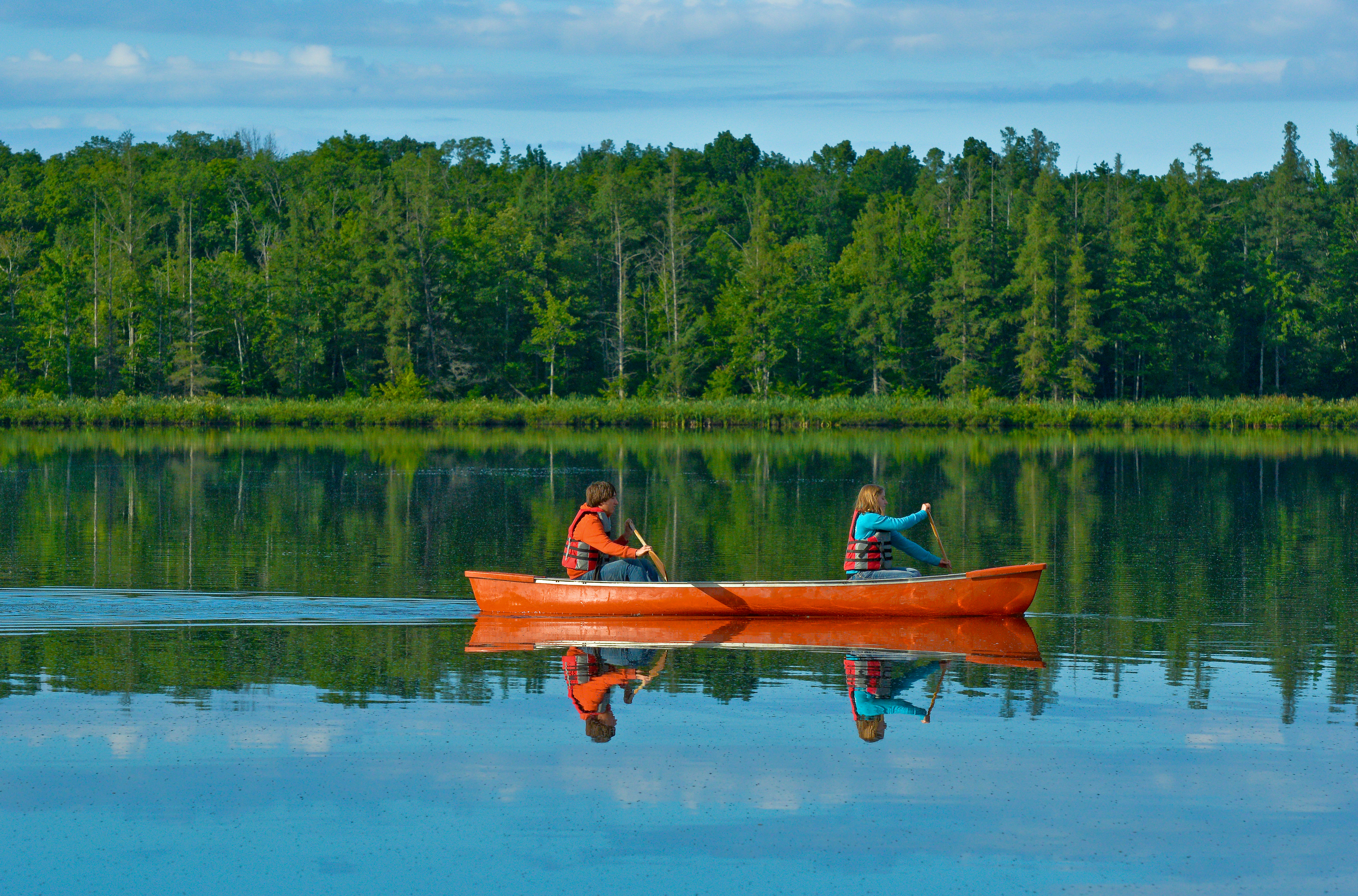
Paddling in the Greenock Swamp

Cargill remains a small rural community with about 250 residents. Many historic homes and buildings survive, including the row of brick workers’ houses, the hotel, the old bank building, the old woollen mill and original main street storefront buildings. The nearby Greenock Swamp Wetland Complex, comprising 8,500 acres, is a protected natural area and wetland of distinction designated in 1982 for its ecological importance.

The village retains strong connections to its history through local heritage initiatives, tourism, and preservation projects.

== Media ==
- Walkerton Herald Times - Walkerton's local newspaper, owned by Midwestern Newspapers.
- Cable television is provided by Rogers TV
- CFBW-FM 91.3 "Bluewater Radio" - Walkerton/Hanover and area local news coverage, weather, and community talk alongside music genres spanning country, blues, bluegrass, oldies (60s–70s), rock, pop, jazz, gospel, folk, Indigenous, and specialty shows
- CKNX-FM 101.7 "The One" - local, regional and national news and adult contemporary music
- CIBU-FM 94.5 "The Bull" - local, regional and national news and classic rock music
- CKNX (AM) 920 - country music

== Bus Transportation ==
- Voyago (buses from Hanover, Ontario) (formerly Kunkel Bus Lines) (formerly for students bused to Mary Immaculate School in Chepstow, Ontario) (for students bused to Walkerton)
- Ross Young Bus Lines (buses from Tiverton, Ontario) (serving the Bruce County area) (for students bused to Mary Immaculate School in Chepstow, Ontario) (also for students bused to Walkerton)

== See also ==
- Henry Cargill
- Bruce County

== Sources ==
- McKague, Kevin. Henry Cargill: Bruce County's Captain of Industry, 2021.
- Bennett, Susan L. “Cargill, Henry.” Dictionary of Canadian Biography, vol. 13. University of Toronto/Université Laval, 2003.
- Robertson, Norman. The History of the County of Bruce, 1906.
- Centennial Souvenir Book of Cargill: 1879–1979. Walkerton Herald-Times, 1979.
- McKague, Kevin. Cargill Business History: 1880-1984. Bruce County Bookstore, 2024.
- Hilborn, Robin. The Bruce. Bruce County Historical Society, 2018.
- Cathcart, Ruth. The Architecture of a Provincial Society: Houses of Bruce County, Ontario, 1850-1900, The Red House Press, 1999.
- Greenock Township History 1856-1981.
