= Wellington David Cargill =

Canadian politician

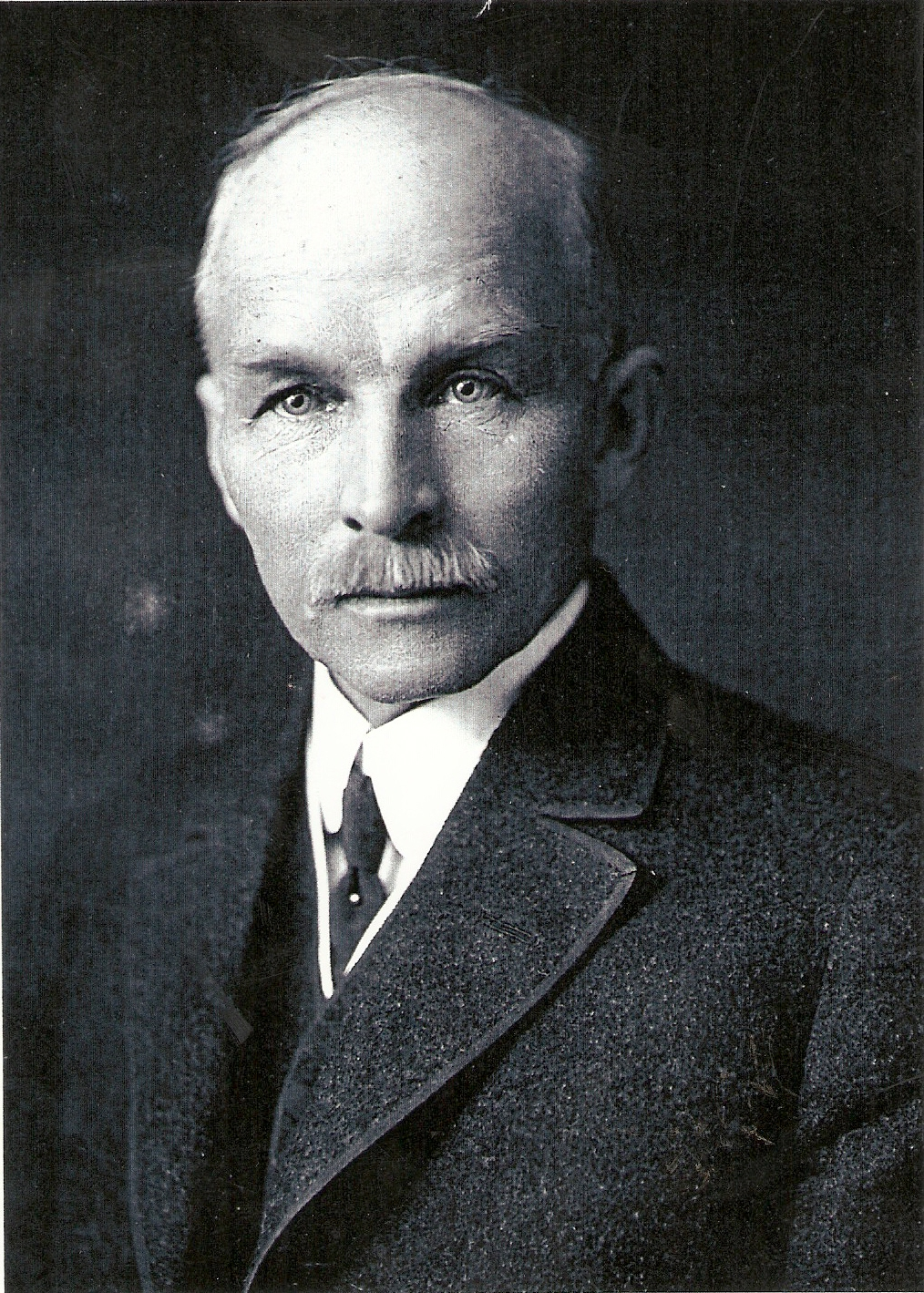

Ontario MPP
- In office 1914–1919
- Preceded by: John Anderson
- Succeeded by: Frank Rennie
- Constituency: Bruce South

Personal details
- Born: February 26, 1865 Nassagaweya Township, Canada West
- Died: March 13, 1942 (aged 77) Walkerton, Ontario
- Party: Conservative
- Spouse: Elizabeth Kyle (m. 1891)
- Occupation: Manufacturer

Wellington David Cargill (February 26, 1865 – March 13, 1942) was an Ontario manufacturer and political figure. He represented Bruce South in the Legislative Assembly of Ontario as a Conservative member from 1914 to 1919.

He was born in Nassagaweya Township, Canada West, the son of Henry Cargill, and educated in Galt and Guelph. In 1891, he married Elizabeth Kyle. He was president of Cargill Ltd. and the Dominion Well Supply Co. in Cargill. In 1913, he ran unsuccessfully for a seat in the federal parliament.

Much of the white pine had been removed from the Greenock Swamp by the time that Cargill took over his father's lumber business. He built a rail line to allow a small train to haul timber out of the swamp; however, the track kept sinking into the swamp and the business soon foundered.

He died at Walkerton in 1942.
