= Alexander Shaw (Canadian politician) =

Canadian politician (1833–1911)

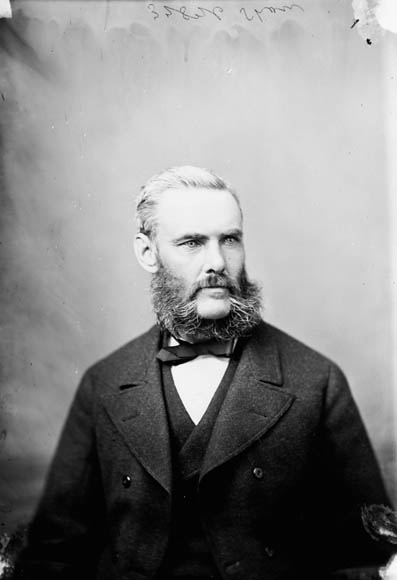
Alexander Shaw, MP, South Bruce, Ontario, b. January 13, 1833–d. April 21, 1911. Taken in Ottawa March 1879

Alexander Shaw (January 13, 1833 – April 21, 1911) was a Canadian lawyer and political figure. He represented Bruce South in the House of Commons of Canada as a Liberal-Conservative member from 1878 to 1882.

He was born in Ramsay Township, Upper Canada in 1833, the son of John Shaw. He was educated in Perth and studied law there. In 1853, he moved to Bruce County and settled at Kincardine. Shaw married Anna Robertson. He later moved to Walkerton and became solicitor for the county in 1867. He also served as mayor of Walkerton. Shaw defeated Edward Blake in Bruce South in the general election of 1878; he ran unsuccessfully against Rupert Mearse Wells in the riding of Bruce East in 1882.

His brother William McNairn Shaw was also a lawyer and served in the Ontario legislative assembly.

1878 Canadian federal election: Bruce South
Party	Candidate	Votes
Liberal–Conservative	Alexander Shaw	2,673
Liberal	Edward Blake	2,598
Source: Canadian Elections Database
