= Foster Graham Moffatt =

Canadian politician from Ontario

Member of the Ontario Provincial Parliament for Bruce South
- In office June 27, 1928 – September 17, 1929
- Preceded by: Malcolm Alex McCallum
- Succeeded by: William John MacKay

Personal details
- Party: Conservative

Foster Graham Moffatt was a Canadian politician from the Conservative Party of Ontario. He represented Bruce South in the Legislative Assembly of Ontario from 1928 to 1929. He was elected in a by-election to replace Progressive Malcolm Alex McCallum whose election was voided. Moffatt was unseated in the 1934 Ontario general election by Liberal William John MacKay.

== See also ==
- 17th Parliament of Ontario
