= William John MacKay =

Canadian politician from Ontario

Member of the Ontario Provincial Parliament for Bruce South
- In office September 30, 1929 – April 3, 1934
- Preceded by: Foster Graham Moffatt
- Succeeded by: constituency dissolved

Personal details
- Party: Liberal

William John MacKay was a Canadian politician from the Ontario Liberal Party. He represented Bruce South in the Legislative Assembly of Ontario from 1929 to 1934.

== See also ==
- 18th Parliament of Ontario
