= 2018 Bruce County municipal elections =

Local election in Ontario, Canada

Elections were held in Bruce County, Ontario on October 22, 2018 in conjunction with municipal elections across the province.

== Bruce County Council ==
Bruce County Council consists of the mayors of the constituent municipalities.

Position	Elected
Arran-Elderslie Mayor	Steve Hammell
Brockton Mayor	Chris Peabody
Huron-Kinloss Mayor	Mitch Twolan
Kincardine Mayor	Anne Eadie
Northern Bruce Peninsula Mayor	Milt McIver
Saugeen Shores Mayor	Luke Charbonneau (acclaimed)
South Bruce Mayor	Robert Buckle
South Bruce Peninsula Mayor	Janice Jackson

== Arran-Elderslie ==
Mayoral Candidate	Vote	%
Steve Hammell	1,847	67.75
Paul Eagleson (X)	879	32.25

== Brockton ==
Mayoral Candidate	Vote	%
Chris Peabody	2,352	63.38
Charlie Bagnato	1,359	36.62

== Huron-Kinloss ==
Mayoral Candidate	Vote	%
Mitch Twolan (X)	1,846	66.69
Brian MacEachern	922	33.31

== Kincardine ==
Mayoral Candidate	Vote	%
Anne Eadie (X)	3,435	90.18
Ron Stephens	374	9.82

== Northern Bruce Peninsula ==
Mayoral Candidate	Vote	%
Milt McIver (X)	2,727	69.78
Jim Mosiuk	887	22.70
Leroy D. Dirckx	294	7.52

== Saugeen Shores ==
Mayoral Candidate	Vote	%
Luke Charbonneau	Acclaimed	

== South Bruce ==
Mayoral Candidate	Vote	%
Robert Buckle (X)	1,380	63.57
Brian Knox	791	36.43

== South Bruce Peninsula ==
Mayoral Candidate	Vote	%
Janice Jackson (X)	3,795	65.02
Ana Vukovic	675	11.56
Lois Keays	648	11.10
Neil Richardson	580	9.94
John C. Schnurr	139	2.38
