= Hamilton Parke O'Connor =

Canadian lawyer and political figure

Ontario MPP
- In office 1882–1894
- Preceded by: Rupert Mearse Wells
- Succeeded by: Reuben Eldridge Truax
- Constituency: Bruce South

Personal details
- Born: November 10, 1844 London, Canada West
- Died: September 13, 1900 (aged 55) Walkerton, Ontario
- Party: Liberal
- Spouse: Jane Watkins McLean (m. 1875)

Hamilton Parke O'Connor, QC (November 10, 1844 – September 13, 1900) was an Ontario lawyer and political figure. He represented Bruce South in the Legislative Assembly of Ontario from 1882 to 1894 as a Liberal member.

He was born in London, Canada West in 1844, the son of Hamilton Bligh O'Connor. He qualified to practice as an attorney in 1867 and was called to the bar in 1878. In 1875, he married Jane Watkins McLean. O'Connor served as mayor of Walkerton in 1880 and 1881. He was elected to the provincial assembly in an 1882 by-election held after Rupert Mearse Wells was elected to the House of Commons. In 1890, he was named Queen's Counsel. He died in 1900.
