= John Walter Findlay =

Canadian politician

Member of Parliament for Bruce South
- In office December 1921 – October 1925
- Preceded by: Reuben Eldridge Truax
- Succeeded by: Walter Allan Hall

Personal details
- Born: John Walter Findlay; 12 February 1866 Portage-du-Fort, Canada East
- Died: 1 August 1943 (aged 77)
- Party: Progressive
- Profession: farmer

John Walter Findlay (12 February 1866 – 1 August 1943) was a Progressive party member of the House of Commons of Canada. He was born in Portage-du-Fort, Quebec and became a farmer.

From 1915 to 1917, Findlay served as a councillor of Brant Township, Ontario. From 1918 to 1921, he was deputy reeve of that township.

He was elected to Parliament at the Bruce South riding in the 1921 general election. After serving his only federal term, the 14th Canadian Parliament, Findlay was defeated by Walter Allan Hall of the Liberals.
