= Francis Hurdon =

Canadian politician

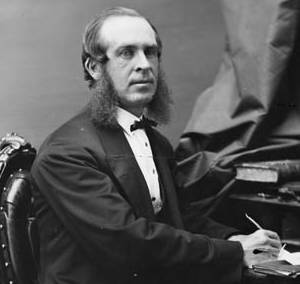
Francis Hurdon Source: Library and Archives Canada

Francis Hurdon (18 June 1834 – 19 December 1914) was an Ontario businessman and political figure. He represented Bruce South in the 1st Canadian Parliament as a Conservative member.

He was born in Camelford, Cornwall, England in 1834, the son of James Hurdon, and educated at Wadebridge. He was a grain merchant in Kincardine and served on the town council there.

In 1857, Hurdon married Charlotte S. Chubb. He died in Toronto at the age of 80.

1867 Canadian federal election: Bruce South
Party	Candidate	Votes
Conservative	Francis Hurdon	1,777
Unknown	W. Rastall	1,624
Unknown	Mr. Hall	5
Eligible voters		4,066
Source: Canadian Parliamentary Guide, 1871

1872 Canadian federal election: Bruce South/Bruce-Sud
Party	Candidate	Votes
Liberal	Edward Blake	1,878
Conservative	Francis Hurdon	190
Source: Canadian Elections Database
