= Rupert Mearse Wells =

Canadian politician (1835–1902)

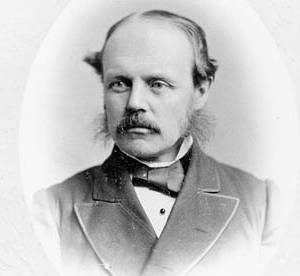

Member of Parliament for Bruce East
- In office 1883–1887
- Preceded by: New riding
- Succeeded by: Henry Cargill

Ontario MPP
- In office 1872–1882
- Preceded by: Edward Blake
- Succeeded by: Hamilton Parke O'Connor
- Constituency: Bruce South

4th Speaker of the Legislative Assembly of Ontario
- In office 1874–1879
- Preceded by: James Currie
- Succeeded by: Charles Clarke

Personal details
- Born: November 28, 1835 Prescott County, Upper Canada
- Died: May 11, 1902 (aged 66)
- Party: Liberal
- Occupation: Lawyer

Rupert Mearse Wells (November 28, 1835 – May 11, 1902) was speaker of the Legislature of Ontario in 1874 to 1879 and served as Liberal MLA for Bruce South from 1872 to 1882. He represented Bruce East in the House of Commons of Canada from 1883 to 1887 as a Liberal.

He was born in Prescott County in Upper Canada in 1835 and attended the University of Toronto. He studied law, was called to the bar in 1857 and entered the practice of law in L'Orignal. He joined the law practice of Edward Blake in 1860 and left that firm to partner with Angus Morrison in 1870. He served as attorney for York County and the city of Toronto in 1872. He was elected to the provincial legislature in an 1872 by-election after Edward Blake resigned to retain his seat in the federal parliament. In 1876, he was named Queen's Counsel.

== Electoral history ==
Ontario provincial by-election, September 21, 1872: Bruce South Resignation of Edward Blake
Party	Candidate	Votes	%
Liberal	Rupert Mearse Wells	1,782	52.14
Conservative	Mr. Brocelbank	1,636	47.86
Total valid votes		3,418	100.0
Liberal hold			
Source: History of the Electoral Districts, Legislatures and Ministries of the Province of Ontario

1875 Ontario general election: Bruce South
Party	Candidate	Votes	%	±%
Liberal	Rupert Mearse Wells	1,864	65.87	+13.73
Conservative	D.W. Ross	966	34.13	−13.73
Turnout		2,830	49.26	
Eligible voters		5,745		
Liberal hold		Swing		+13.73
Source: Elections Ontario

1879 Ontario general election: Bruce South
Party	Candidate	Votes	%	±%
Liberal	Rupert Mearse Wells	2,866	50.62	−15.25
Conservative	Mr. Baird	2,796	49.38	+15.25
Total valid votes		5,662	72.67	+23.41
Eligible voters		7,791		
Liberal hold		Swing		−15.25
Source: Elections Ontario
