= Frank Rennie (politician) =

Canadian politician from Ontario

Member of the Ontario Provincial Parliament for Bruce South
- In office October 20, 1919 – July 22, 1921
- Preceded by: Wellington David Cargill
- Succeeded by: Malcolm Alex McCallum

Personal details
- Party: Liberal

Frank Rennie is a Canadian politician from Ontario. He represented Bruce South in the Legislative Assembly of Ontario from 1919 to 1923.

== See also ==
- 15th Parliament of Ontario
