= Bruce South (provincial electoral district) =

Ontario electoral district

Defunct provincial electoral district
- Legislature: Legislative Assembly of Ontario
- District created: 1867
- District abolished: 1933
- First contested: 1867
- Last contested: 1929

Bruce South was an electoral riding in Ontario, Canada. It was created in 1867 at the time of confederation and was abolished in 1933 before the 1934 election.

== Members of Provincial Parliament ==
Bruce South
| Assembly | Years | Member | Party |
|---|---|---|---|
| 1st | 1867–1871 | Edward Blake | Liberal |
| 2nd | 1871–1872 | Edward Blake | Liberal |
| 2nd | 1872–1874 | Rupert Mearse Wells | Liberal |
| 3rd | 1875–1879 | Rupert Mearse Wells | Liberal |
| 4th | 1879–1882 | Rupert Mearse Wells | Liberal |
| 4th | 1882–1883 | Hamilton Parke O'Connor | Liberal |
| 5th | 1883–1886 | Hamilton Parke O'Connor | Liberal |
| 6th | 1886–1890 | Hamilton Parke O'Connor | Liberal |
| 7th | 1890–1894 | Hamilton Parke O'Connor | Liberal |
| 8th | 1894–1898 | Reuben Eldridge Truax | Liberal |
| 9th | 1898–1902 | Reuben Eldridge Truax | Liberal |
| 10th | 1902–1904 | Reuben Eldridge Truax | Liberal |
| 11th | 1905–1908 | Robert Edwin Clapp | Conservative |
| 12th | 1908–1911 | Reuben Eldridge Truax | Liberal |
| 13th | 1911–1914 | John Anderson | Liberal |
| 14th | 1914–1919 | Wellington David Cargill | Conservative |
| 15th | 1919–1923 | Frank Rennie | Liberal |
| 16th | 1923–1926 | Malcolm Alex McCallum | United Farmers |
| 17th | 1926–1928 | Malcolm Alex McCallum | Progressive |
| 17th | 1928–1929 | Foster Graham Moffatt | Conservative |
| 18th | 1929–1934 | William John MacKay | Liberal |
Sourced from the Ontario Legislative Assembly
Merged into Bruce before the 1934 election

== Election results ==
1929 Ontario general election
| Party | Candidate | Votes | % | ±% |
|---|---|---|---|---|
| Liberal | William John MacKay | 4,983 | 53.04 | – |
| Conservative | Foster Graham Moffatt | 4,412 | 46.96 | –12.44 |
| Total valid votes | | 9,395 | 99.55 | |
| Total rejected ballots | | 42 | 0.45 | +0.45 |
| Turnout | | 9,437 | 69.43 | – |
| Eligible voters | | 13,593 | | |
| Liberal gain from Conservative | | Swing | | – |
Source: Elections Ontario

Ontario provincial by-election, June 27, 1928 1926 Election declared void
| Party | Candidate | Votes | % | ±% |
|---|---|---|---|---|
| Conservative | Foster Graham Moffatt | 4,505 | 59.40 | +10.06 |
| Progressive | Malcolm Alex McCallum | 3,079 | 40.60 | –10.06 |
| Total valid votes | | 7,584 | 100.00 | |
| Total rejected ballots | | – | | |
| Turnout | | 7,584 | – | – |
| Eligible voters | | | | |
| Conservative gain from Progressive | | Swing | | +10.06 |
Source: Elections Ontario

1926 Ontario general election
| Party | Candidate | Votes | % | ±% |
|---|---|---|---|---|
| Progressive | Malcolm Alex McCallum | 4,922 | 50.66 | +14.83 |
| Conservative | Wellington David Cargill | 4,794 | 49.34 | +14.42 |
| Total valid votes | | 9,716 | 99.51 | |
| Total rejected ballots | | 48 | 0.49 | –0.42 |
| Turnout | | 9,764 | 72.30 | +4.89 |
| Eligible voters | | 13,505 | | |
| Progressive gain from United Farmers | | Swing | | +0.21 |
Source: Elections Ontario

1923 Ontario general election
| Party | Candidate | Votes | % | ±% |
|---|---|---|---|---|
| United Farmers | Malcolm Alex McCallum | 1,942 | 35.83 | +6.19 |
| Conservative | Frederick William Lippert | 1,893 | 34.93 | +6.44 |
| Liberal | Frank Rennie | 1,585 | 29.24 | –12.63 |
| Total valid votes | | 5,420 | 99.09 | |
| Total rejected ballots | | 50 | 0.91 | –1.88 |
| Turnout | | 5,470 | 67.41 | –12.56 |
| Eligible voters | | 8,115 | | |
| United Farmers gain from Liberal | | Swing | | –0.12 |
Source: Elections Ontario

1919 Ontario general election
| Party | Candidate | Votes | % | ±% |
|---|---|---|---|---|
| Liberal | Frank Rennie | 2,727 | 41.88 | –3.35 |
| United Farmers | Joseph John Zetter | 1,930 | 29.64 | – |
| Conservative | Wellington David Cargill | 1,855 | 28.49 | –26.28 |
| Total valid votes | | 6,512 | 97.21 | |
| Total rejected ballots | | 187 | 2.79 | +2.28 |
| Turnout | | 6,699 | 79.97 | –10.47 |
| Eligible voters | | 8,377 | | |
| Liberal gain from Conservative | | Swing | | –1.68 |
Source: Elections Ontario

1914 Ontario general election
| Party | Candidate | Votes | % | ±% |
|---|---|---|---|---|
| Conservative | Wellington David Cargill | 1,820 | 54.77 | +9.15 |
| Liberal | John Alexander Johnston | 1,503 | 45.23 | –9.15 |
| Total valid votes | | 3,323 | 99.49 | |
| Total rejected ballots | | 17 | 0.51 | +0.11 |
| Turnout | | 3,340 | 90.44 | +14.05 |
| Eligible voters | | 3,693 | | |
| Conservative gain from Liberal | | Swing | | +9.15 |
Source: Elections Ontario

1911 Ontario general election
| Party | Candidate | Votes | % | ±% |
|---|---|---|---|---|
| Liberal | John Anderson | 1,894 | 54.38 | +2.99 |
| Conservative | Robert Edwin Clapp | 1,589 | 45.62 | –2.99 |
| Total valid votes | | 3,483 | 99.60 | |
| Total rejected ballots | | 14 | 0.40 | +0.20 |
| Turnout | | 3,497 | 76.39 | –9.64 |
| Eligible voters | | 4,578 | | |
| Liberal hold | | Swing | | +2.99 |
Source: Elections Ontario

1908 Ontario general election
| Party | Candidate | Votes | % | ±% |
|---|---|---|---|---|
| Liberal | Reuben Eldridge Truax | 1,774 | 51.39 | +2.36 |
| Conservative | Robert Edwin Clapp | 1,678 | 48.61 | –2.36 |
| Total valid votes | | 3,452 | 99.80 | |
| Total rejected ballots | | 7 | 0.20 | –0.07 |
| Turnout | | 3,459 | 86.02 | +7.37 |
| Eligible voters | | 4,021 | | |
| Liberal gain from Conservative | | Swing | | +2.36 |
Source: Elections Ontario

1905 Ontario general election
| Party | Candidate | Votes | % | ±% |
|---|---|---|---|---|
| Conservative | Robert Edwin Clapp | 1,890 | 50.97 | +1.81 |
| Liberal | Reuben Eldridge Truax | 1,818 | 49.03 | –1.81 |
| Total valid votes | | 3,708 | 99.73 | |
| Total rejected ballots | | 10 | 0.27 | –0.20 |
| Turnout | | 3,718 | 78.65 | +3.98 |
| Eligible voters | | 4,727 | | |
| Conservative gain from Liberal | | Swing | | +1.81 |
Source: Elections Ontario

1902 Ontario general election
| Party | Candidate | Votes | % | ±% |
|---|---|---|---|---|
| Liberal | Reuben Eldridge Truax | 1,932 | 50.84 | – |
| Conservative | Robert Edwin Clapp | 1,868 | 49.16 | – |
| Total valid votes | | 3,800 | 99.53 | |
| Total rejected ballots | | 18 | 0.47 | – |
| Turnout | | 3,818 | 74.67 | – |
| Eligible voters | | 5,113 | | |
| Liberal hold | | Swing | | +0.00 |
Source: Elections Ontario

1898 Ontario general election
| Party | Candidate | Votes |
|---|---|---|
| Liberal | Reuben Eldridge Truax | acclaimed |
Source: Elections Ontario

1894 Ontario general election
| Party | Candidate | Votes | % | ±% |
|---|---|---|---|---|
| Liberal | Reuben Eldridge Truax | 1,913 | 52.05 | –12.36 |
| Liberal-Patrons of Industry | W. Valens | 1,762 | 47.95 | – |
| Total valid votes | | 3,675 | 99.84 | |
| Total rejected ballots | | 6 | 0.16 | –0.16 |
| Turnout | | 3,681 | 68.91 | +4.05 |
| Eligible voters | | 5,342 | | |
| Liberal hold | | Swing | | –6.18 |
Source: Elections Ontario

1890 Ontario general election
| Party | Candidate | Votes | % | ±% |
|---|---|---|---|---|
| Liberal | Hamilton Parke O'Connor | 2,179 | 64.41 | +9.72 |
| Conservative | Mr. Tennant | 1,204 | 35.59 | –9.72 |
| Total valid votes | | 3,383 | 99.68 | |
| Total rejected ballots | | 11 | 0.32 | –0.40 |
| Turnout | | 3,394 | 64.86 | –9.78 |
| Eligible voters | | 5,233 | | |
| Liberal hold | | Swing | | +9.72 |
Source: Elections Ontario

1886 Ontario general election
| Party | Candidate | Votes | % | ±% |
|---|---|---|---|---|
| Liberal | Hamilton Parke O'Connor | 2,024 | 54.69 | – |
| Conservative | A.B. Klein | 1,677 | 45.31 | – |
| Total valid votes | | 3,701 | 99.28 | |
| Total rejected ballots | | 27 | 0.72 | – |
| Turnout | | 3,728 | 74.63 | – |
| Eligible voters | | 4,995 | | |
| Liberal hold | | Swing | | +0.00 |
Source: Elections Ontario

1883 Ontario general election
| Party | Candidate | Votes |
|---|---|---|
| Liberal | Hamilton Parke O'Connor | acclaimed |
Source: Elections Ontario

Ontario provincial by-election, October 18, 1882
| Party | Candidate | Votes | % | ±% |
|---|---|---|---|---|
| Liberal | Hamilton Parke O'Connor | 2,441 | 55.77 | +5.15 |
| Conservative | J.C. Eckford | 1,936 | 44.23 | –5.15 |
| Total valid votes | | 4,377 | 100.00 | |
| Total rejected ballots | | – | | |
| Turnout | | 4,377 | – | – |
| Eligible voters | | | | |
| Liberal hold | | Swing | | +5.15 |
Source: History of the Electoral Districts, Legislatures and Ministries of the Province of Ontario

1879 Ontario general election
| Party | Candidate | Votes | % | ±% |
|---|---|---|---|---|
| Liberal | Rupert Mearse Wells | 2,866 | 50.62 | −15.25 |
| Conservative | R. Baird | 2,796 | 49.38 | +15.25 |
| Total valid votes | | 5,662 | 72.67 | +23.41 |
| Eligible voters | | 7,791 | | |
| Liberal hold | | Swing | | −15.25 |
Source: Elections Ontario

1875 Ontario general election
| Party | Candidate | Votes | % | ±% |
|---|---|---|---|---|
| Liberal | Rupert Mearse Wells | 1,864 | 65.87 | +13.73 |
| Conservative | D.W. Ross | 966 | 34.13 | −13.73 |
| Turnout | | 2,830 | 49.26 | |
| Eligible voters | | 5,745 | | |
| Liberal hold | | Swing | | +13.73 |
Source: Elections Ontario

Ontario provincial by-election, September 21, 1872 Resignation of Edward Blake
| Party | Candidate | Votes | % |
|---|---|---|---|
| Liberal | Rupert Mearse Wells | 1,782 | 52.14 |
| Conservative | Mr. Brocelbank | 1,636 | 47.86 |
| Total valid votes | | 3,418 | 100.0 |
| Liberal hold | | | |
Source: History of the Electoral Districts, Legislatures and Ministries of the Province of Ontario

Ontario provincial by-election, January 18, 1872 Ministerial by-election
| Party | Candidate | Votes |
|---|---|---|
| Liberal | Edward Blake | Acclaimed |
Source: History of the Electoral Districts, Legislatures and Ministries of the Province of Ontario

1871 Ontario general election
| Party | Candidate | Votes | % | ±% |
|---|---|---|---|---|
| Liberal | Edward Blake | 2,082 | 55.21 | +5.11 |
| Conservative | Alexander Sproat | 1,689 | 44.79 | −5.11 |
| Turnout | | 3,771 | 79.79 | −5.04 |
| Eligible voters | | 4,726 | | |
| Liberal hold | | Swing | | +5.11 |
Source: Elections Ontario

1867 Ontario general election
| Party | Candidate | Votes | % |
|---|---|---|---|
| Liberal | Edward Blake | 1,726 | 50.10 |
| Conservative | T. Broclebank | 1,719 | 49.90 |
| Total valid votes | | 3,445 | 84.83 |
| Eligible voters | | 4,061 | |
| Liberal pickup new district. | | | |
Source: Elections Ontario
