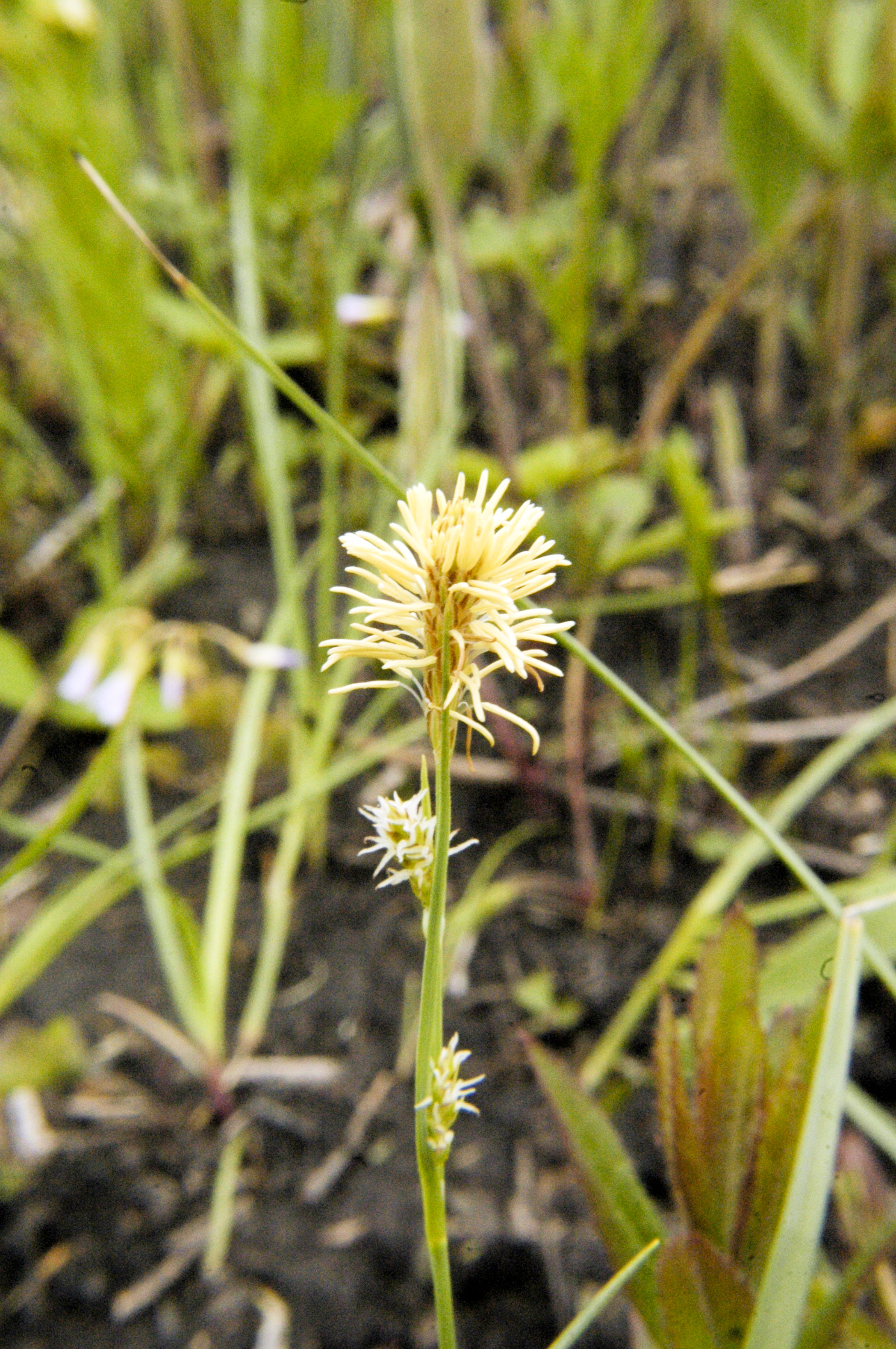
- Carex tetanica

Scientific classification
- Kingdom: Plantae
- Clade: Tracheophytes
- Clade: Angiosperms
- Clade: Monocots
- Clade: Commelinids
- Order: Poales
- Family: Cyperaceae
- Genus: Carex
- Species: C. tetanica

Binomial name
- Carex tetanica Schkuhr, 1806

= Carex tetanica =

Species of sedge

Carex tetanica, also known as rigid sedge, is a species of flowering plant in the sedge family, Cyperaceae. It is native to Central and Eastern Canada and the United States.

== See also ==
- List of Carex species
