= Bruce South (federal electoral district) =

Former federal electoral district in Ontario, Canada

Ontario electoral district

Defunct federal electoral district
- Legislature: House of Commons
- District created: 1867, 1903
- District abolished: 1882, 1933
- First contested: 1867
- Last contested: 1930

Bruce South was a federal electoral district in Ontario, Canada, that was represented in the House of Commons of Canada from 1867 to 1882 and from 1903 to 1935.

The original district was created by the British North America Act 1867. It consisted of the Townships of Kincardine (including the Village of Kincardine), Greenock Brant, Huron, Kinloss, Culross, and Carrick. It was abolished in 1882 when it was redistributed between Bruce East and Bruce West ridings.

It was recreated in 1903 from those two ridings. The second incarnation of the south riding consisted of the townships of Brant, Carrick, Culross, Elderslie, Greenock, Huron, and Kinloss, the town of Walkerton, and the villages of Chelsey, Lucknow, Paisley and Teeswater in the county of Bruce.

In 1924, it was redefined to consist of the part of the county of Bruce lying south of and including the townships of Huron, Kinloss, Greenock and Elderslie.

The electoral district was abolished in 1933 when it was merged into Bruce riding.

== Members of Parliament ==
This riding elected the following members of Parliament:

Parliament	Years	Member	Party
1st	1867–1872	Francis Hurdon	Conservative
2nd	1872–1873	Edward Blake	Liberal
2nd	1873–1874	Edward Blake	Liberal
3rd	1874–1875	Edward Blake	Liberal
3rd	1875–1878	Edward Blake	Liberal
4th	1878–1882	Alexander Shaw	Liberal–Conservative
Riding dissolved into Bruce East and Bruce West
Riding re-created from Bruce East and Bruce West
10th	1904–1908	Peter H. McKenzie	Liberal
11th	1908–1911	James J. Donnelly	Conservative
12th	1911–1913	James J. Donnelly	Conservative
12th	1913–1917	Reuben Eldridge Truax	Liberal
13th	1917–1921	Reuben Eldridge Truax	Opposition (Laurier Liberals)
14th	1921–1925	John Walter Findlay	Progressive
15th	1925–1926	Walter Allan Hall	Liberal
16th	1926–1930	Walter Allan Hall	Liberal
17th	1930–1935	Walter Allan Hall	Liberal
Riding dissolved into Bruce

== Election results ==
=== 1867-1882 ===
1867 Canadian federal election
Party	Candidate	Votes
Conservative	Francis Hurdon	1,777
Unknown	W. Rastall	1,624
Unknown	Mr. Hall	5
Eligible voters		4,066
Source: Canadian Parliamentary Guide, 1871

1872 Canadian federal election
Party	Candidate	Votes
Liberal	Edward Blake	1,878
Conservative	Francis Hurdon	190
Source: Canadian Elections Database

On Mr. Blake's appointment as Minister without Portfolio, 7 November 1873:

By-election on 14 December 1873
Party	Candidate	Votes
Liberal	Edward Blake	acclaimed

1874 Canadian federal election
Party	Candidate	Votes
Liberal	Edward Blake	2,312
Unknown	R. Baird	1,991

By-Election: On Mr. Blake's appointment as Minister of Justice, 19 May 1875:

By-election on 2 June 1875
Party	Candidate	Votes
Liberal	Edward Blake	acclaimed

1878 Canadian federal election
Party	Candidate	Votes
Liberal–Conservative	Alexander Shaw	2,673
Liberal	Edward Blake	2,598
Source: Canadian Elections Database

=== 1904-1935 ===
1904 Canadian federal election
Party	Candidate	Votes
Liberal	Peter H. McKenzie	3,082
Conservative	James J. Donnelly	2,938

1908 Canadian federal election
Party	Candidate	Votes
Conservative	James J. Donnelly	3,005
Liberal	Peter H. McKenzie	2,812

1911 Canadian federal election
Party	Candidate	Votes
Conservative	James J. Donnelly	2,878
Liberal	R. E. Truax	2,775

Mr. J.J. Donnelly summoned to the Senate, 26 May 1913:

By-election on 30 October 1913
Party	Candidate	Votes
Liberal	R. E. Truax	2,948
Conservative	W. D. Cargill	2,833

1917 Canadian federal election
Party	Candidate	Votes
Opposition (Laurier Liberals)	Reuben Eldridge Truax	3,628
Government (Unionist)	Alexander Eugene McNab	3,456

1921 Canadian federal election
Party	Candidate	Votes
Progressive	John Walter Findlay	4,762
Liberal	Reuben Eldridge Truax	3,849
Conservative	John Purvis	2,232

1925 Canadian federal election
Party	Candidate	Votes
Liberal	Walter Allan Hall	3,965
Conservative	Frederick William Lippert	3,362
Progressive	John Walter Findlay	2,128

1926 Canadian federal election
Party	Candidate	Votes
Liberal	Walter Allan Hall	5,050
Conservative	George S. Fowler	3,504
Progressive	John Weigel	1,791

1930 Canadian federal election
Party	Candidate	Votes
Liberal	Walter Allan Hall	5,738
Conservative	Foster Graham Moffat	4,837

== See also ==
- List of Canadian electoral districts
- Historical federal electoral districts of Canada
