= Formosa, Ontario =

Coordinates: 44°04′00″N 81°12′50″W

Church of the Immaculate Conception

Formosa is a community located in the municipality of South Bruce, in Bruce County, Ontario, Canada.

Prominent features of Formosa include:

- a hilltop church (named the Church of the Immaculate conception) built from 1875-1883
- Lion and Lioness Park – a picnic stop
- Waterloo Brewing Company
- site of the Saugeen Conservation's main administrative office
- Formosa Inn and TNT General Store (1886)

Neighbouring towns include Mildmay and Walkerton.

The postal code for the hamlet is N0G 1W0.

== Origins ==
Bird's Eye view of Formosa

Rev. Gaspar Matoga, a Jesuit missionary, visited the area in January 1853, on one of many trips to minister to the new settlements of the region. Upon seeing the valley in which the present day hamlet is situated, he described it as formosa, the Latin word for beautiful.

== School ==
The new community of Formosa had a school as early as 1854. There have been schools in one form or another on the present school grounds since 1868.

The first school in Formosa was a log structure, erected in 1854. It doubled as a temporary church in the early days of the community for the visiting Jesuit missionaries. It was on the northwest corner of lot 30, Concession A, Carrick Township. The Formosa school burnt down in 1857.

With the growth of the community, a large stone school was completed in 1868, on land donated by local businessman F.X. Messner. He also donated land and a 2 1/2-story convent building in 1872, hoping to establish Formosa as a headquarters for the School Sisters of Notre Dame. This was situated on the northeast hill of the valley, near the church. A smaller one-story stone school was also constructed nearby.

When the convent didn't grow as much as anticipated, the convent building was converted into a four-room school as well, and living quarters for a smaller number of nuns was added as a wing to the convent building.

For a number of years in the late nineteenth century Formosa had three school buildings in use simultaneously. The convent school was used for girls grades one to eight. The large stone school accommodated the boys of grades five and up. The small, one-story stone school was used for boys grades one to four.

Over time, the population lessened, and eventually the schools were consolidated in the convent building's four classrooms. The large stone school was used as community centre for some time.

In 1926, a residence fire at the foot of the hill spread and gutted the convent school. Construction commenced on a new school and detached convent. In the interim, classes were once again held in the former 1868 large stone school and other locations. The new school and convent were completed in 1927.

In 1966, a larger central school replacing a number of rural schools was planned. It was built directly behind the site of the 1926 school, and completed in 1968. It is called Immaculate Conception, part of the Bruce-Grey Catholic District School Board. It is a large modern school, in close proximity to the nearby convent. Currently, the school has a French Immersion program in addition to its regular program.

The School Sisters of Notre Dame provided teachers for the Formosa schools nearly continuously from 1872 to 1976, working in concert with lay educators to provide a Catholic-based education. After 1976, a few stayed on volunteering at the school into the early 1990s. In 1996, the remaining sisters moved to a private residence in Walkerton and the convent was sold for private residential use.

== Formosa Church ==
The Formosa church, situated at the top of the hill at the north end of the hamlet, was envisioned as a large permanent church for the new and growing Roman Catholic parish. At the time, a wooden church that had been completed in 1857 had required two expansions to handle the increasing number of German immigrants flowing into the area. The architect was charged with designing a stone church capable of seating 1200 to 1500 people.

Rev. Archangelus Gstir arrived to lead the Formosa parish in 1861. Soon afterwards, he oversaw the expansion of the original 1857 wooden church, appealing on behalf of the parishioners to Ludwig I of Bavaria via the Ludwig Missions-Verin in Munich. He received 2000 Thalers from the King for this initial appeal.

In April 1864, Father Gstir again wrote to Ludwig for funds to build a larger stone church, and subsequently received an additional 1000 Thalers.

Father Gstir returned to his native Tyrol in 1865, and died in 1870.

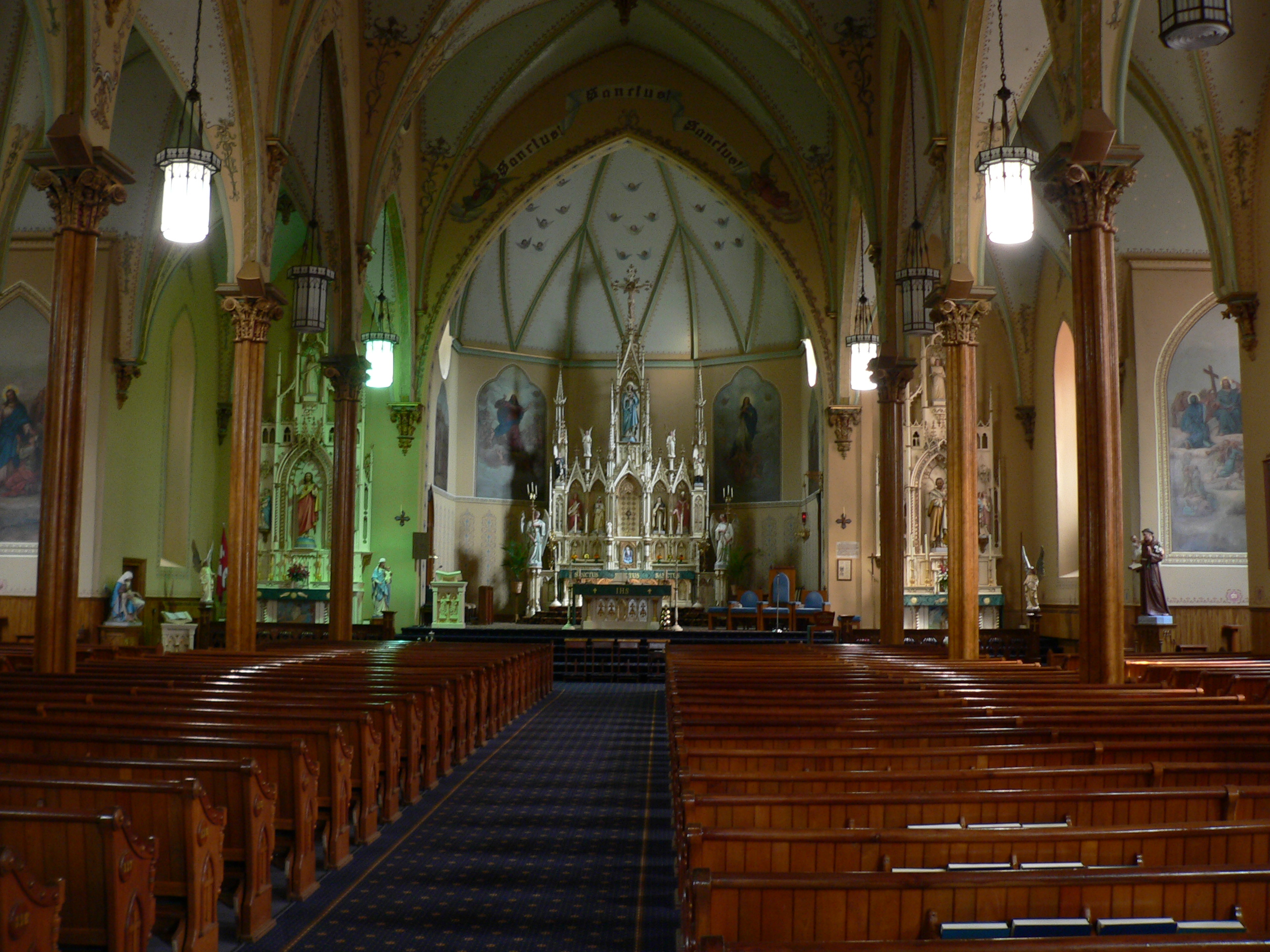
Church Interior

After the foundation of the new stone church was laid in 1875, work proceeded at an uneven pace. The new pastor of the day (Father Louis Elena) and the parishioners did not want to go into debt, so work progressed as fast as contributions allowed. Much of the materials (limestone hand-cut from local rock, and timber) were obtained locally at no expense other than volunteer labour. Other materials had to be purchased and shipped to the area, including sandstone from Guelph quarries.

The shell of the new church, completed in 1880, was constructed over the original wooden church. The old wooden building remained in use until the new roof was completed, after which it was dismantled and removed.

Construction continued for a few more years, with the new church being consecrated on September 13, 1885.

The total expenditure on church, not including free labour and materials, was $28,000. It is estimated that after exchange, the 3000 Thalers received from Ludwig (used partly for the older wooden church and partly for the new stone church) amounted to about $2000.

The story of the church construction is used as a fictional backdrop in the Jane Urquhart novel The Stone Carvers.

== Formosa Spring Brewery ==
The early German settlers quickly established a brewery in Formosa, in 1870. Over the years, the brewery has changed ownership and names many times, and the plant itself changed with renovations, expansions, and reconstructions.

In 1922, the brewery's Buffalo-based owners closed the plant, due to prohibition. In 1924, it reopened as the Formosa Spring Brewery and a program of modernization was undertaken. Beer began to be produced again in 1927, and the brewery operated continually in Formosa from then on to the closure of the plant at the end of 1971.

The summers of 1958 and 1968 were of special note in the history of the brewery; strikes by unionized beer workers shut down beer sales everywhere else in Ontario. Crowds of thirsty Ontario beer drinkers flocked to Formosa, where rationing of one case per customer had to be instituted at times.

In the late 1960s, the plant had reached bottling capacity, and the Formosa site was deemed infeasible for expansion. The owners built a new plant in Barrie, Ontario, and moved operations there, still under the 'Formosa Spring Brewery' name. In 1974, Molson's purchased the Barrie-based Formosa Spring Brewery, renaming it Molson's Brewery.

The Formosa plant was sold and used for a number of years for other industries such as water bottling and fish farming.

With the rise of microbreweries in Ontario in the 1980s and 1990s, the Formosa plant was once again put to use brewing beer. The Algonquin Brewing Company purchased the plant in 1988, and restarted brewing operations in Formosa. They put out a few different varieties of beer, including some they labelled 'Formosa Springs'. The company was subsequently sold to the Brick Brewing Company in 1997, who retained the 'Formosa Springs' label on a few varieties.

In January 2017, Brick put the small company up for sale. On September 7, 2017, Brick Brewing confirmed the completion of the Formosa sale. Brick confirms that the sale transaction closed on September 6. In the winter of 2017, the new owners quickly moved in, installing new equipment, hiring previous employees back, re-opening the brewery beer store and implementing a new commercial craft beer strategy.

== Special events ==
Formosa Homecoming 2011, From July 28 until August 2. The event typically takes place every 10 years, however in 2021, it was postponed to 2022 due to the COVID-19 pandemic.

== Media ==
- Cable television is provided by Wightman Telecom
- CFBW-FM 91.3 "Bluewater Radio" - Walkerton/Hanover and area local news coverage, weather, and community talk alongside music genres spanning country, blues, bluegrass, oldies (60s–70s), rock, pop, jazz, gospel, folk, Indigenous, and specialty shows
- CKNX-FM 101.7 "The One" - local, regional and national news and adult contemporary music
- CIBU-FM 94.5 "The Bull" - local, regional and national news and classic rock music
- CKNX (AM) 920 - country music

== School Bus Transportation ==
- Voyago (buses from Hanover, Ontario) (formerly Kunkel Bus Lines) same with Mildmay and Walkerton
- Montgomery Bus Lines (buses from Wingham, Ontario) same with Formosa and Teeswater
- Ross Young Bus Lines (buses from Tiverton, Ontario)
