= South Bruce, Ontario =

South Bruce
- Municipality (lower-tier)
- Municipality of South Bruce
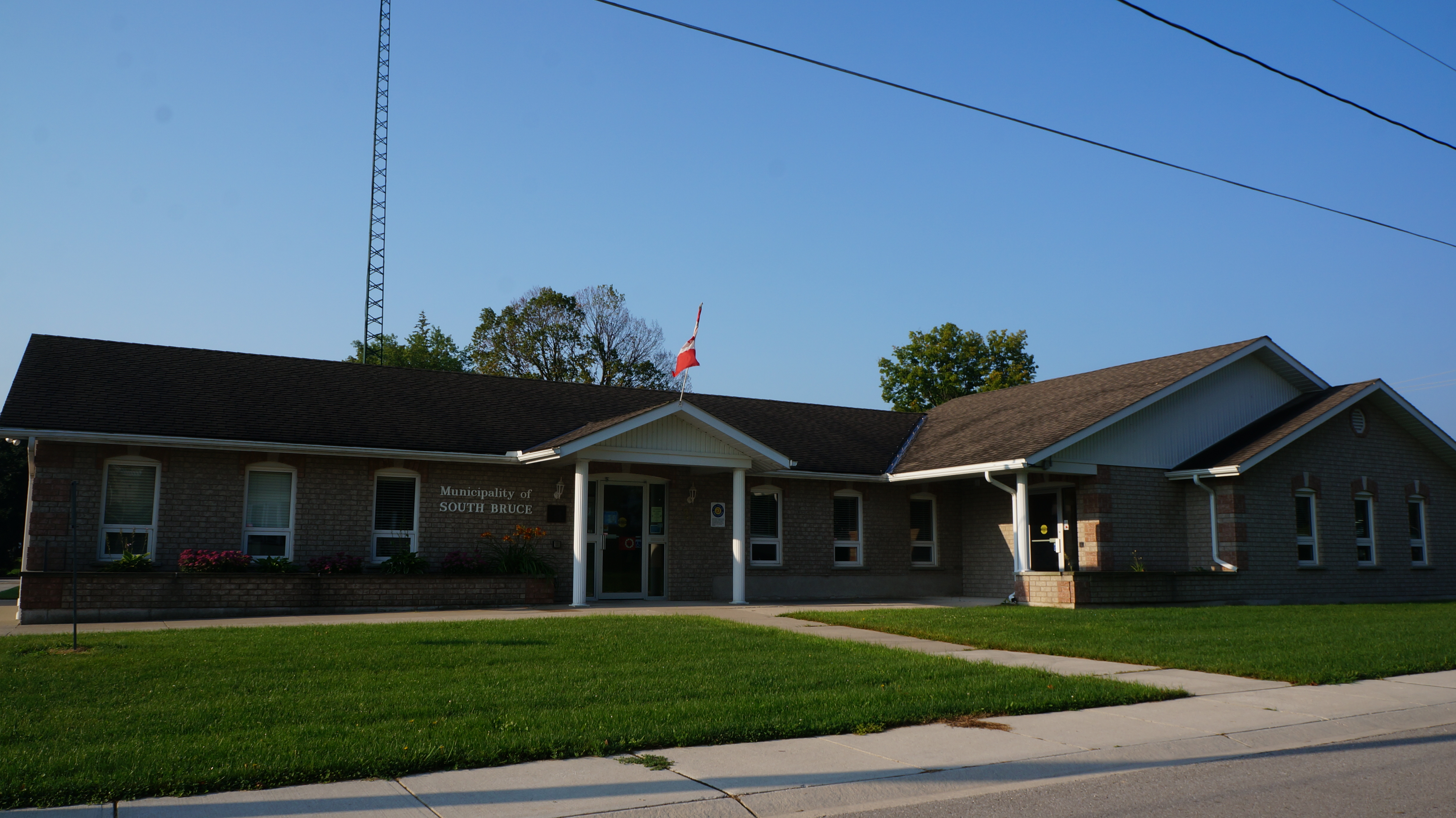
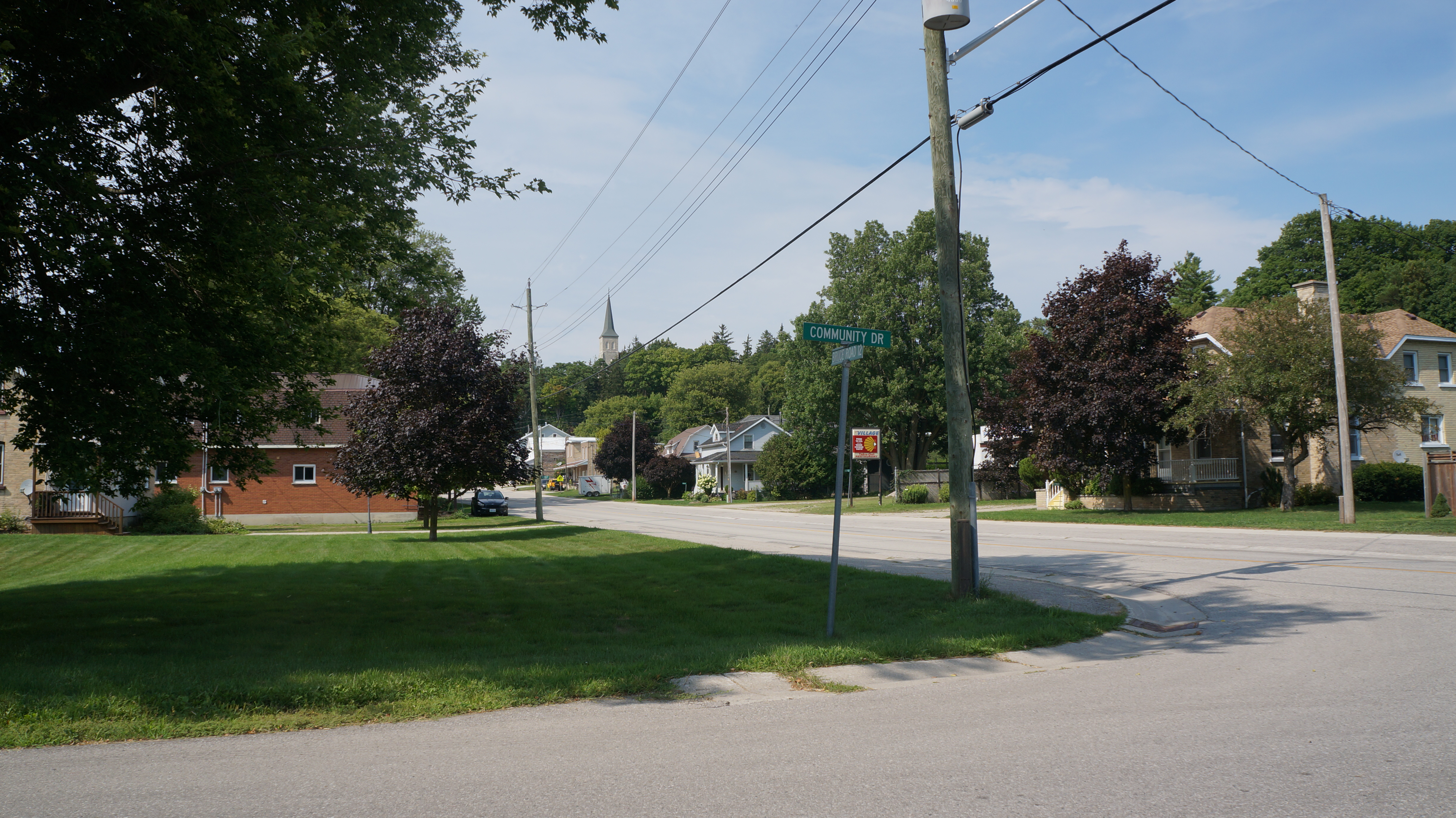
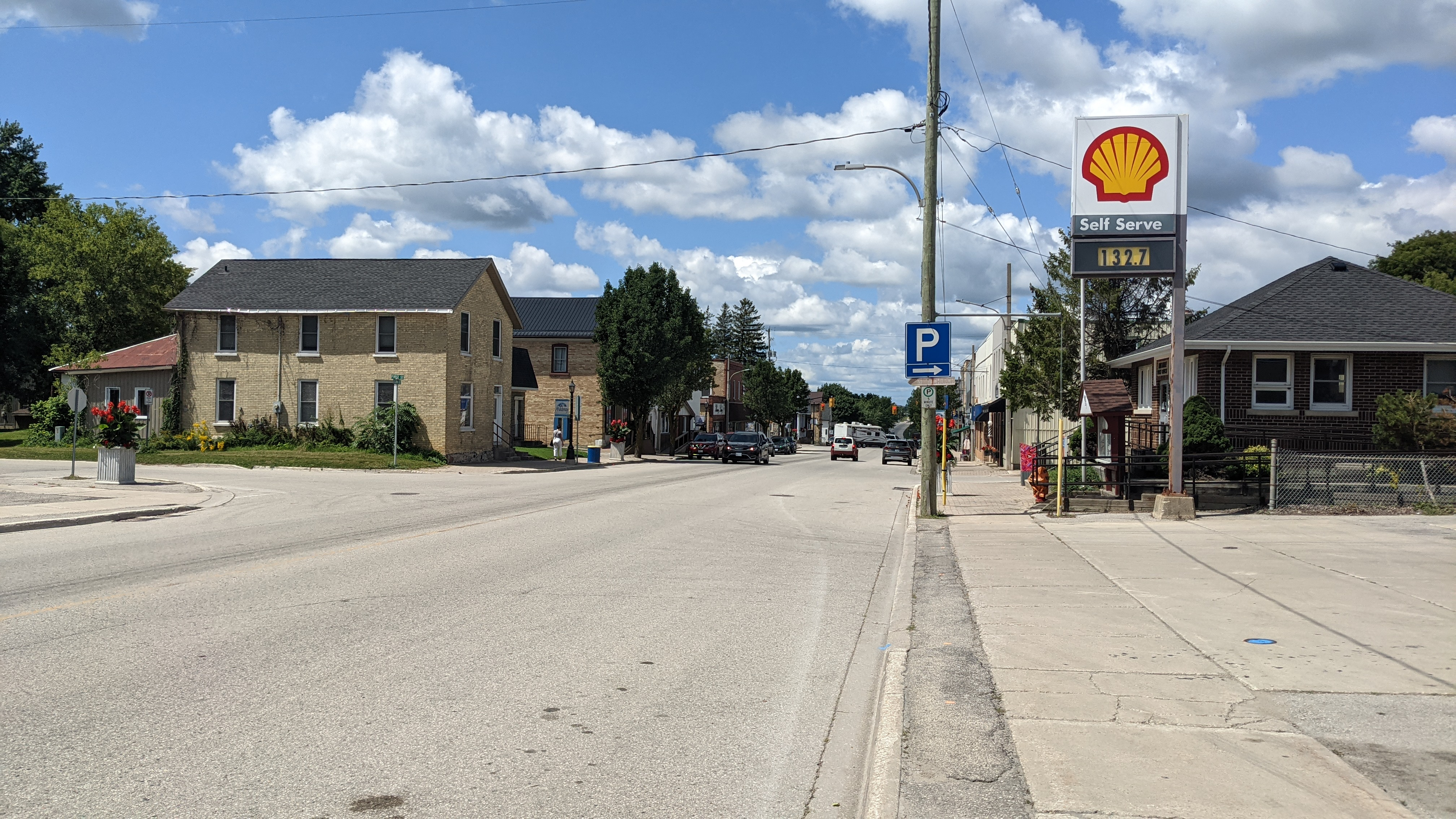
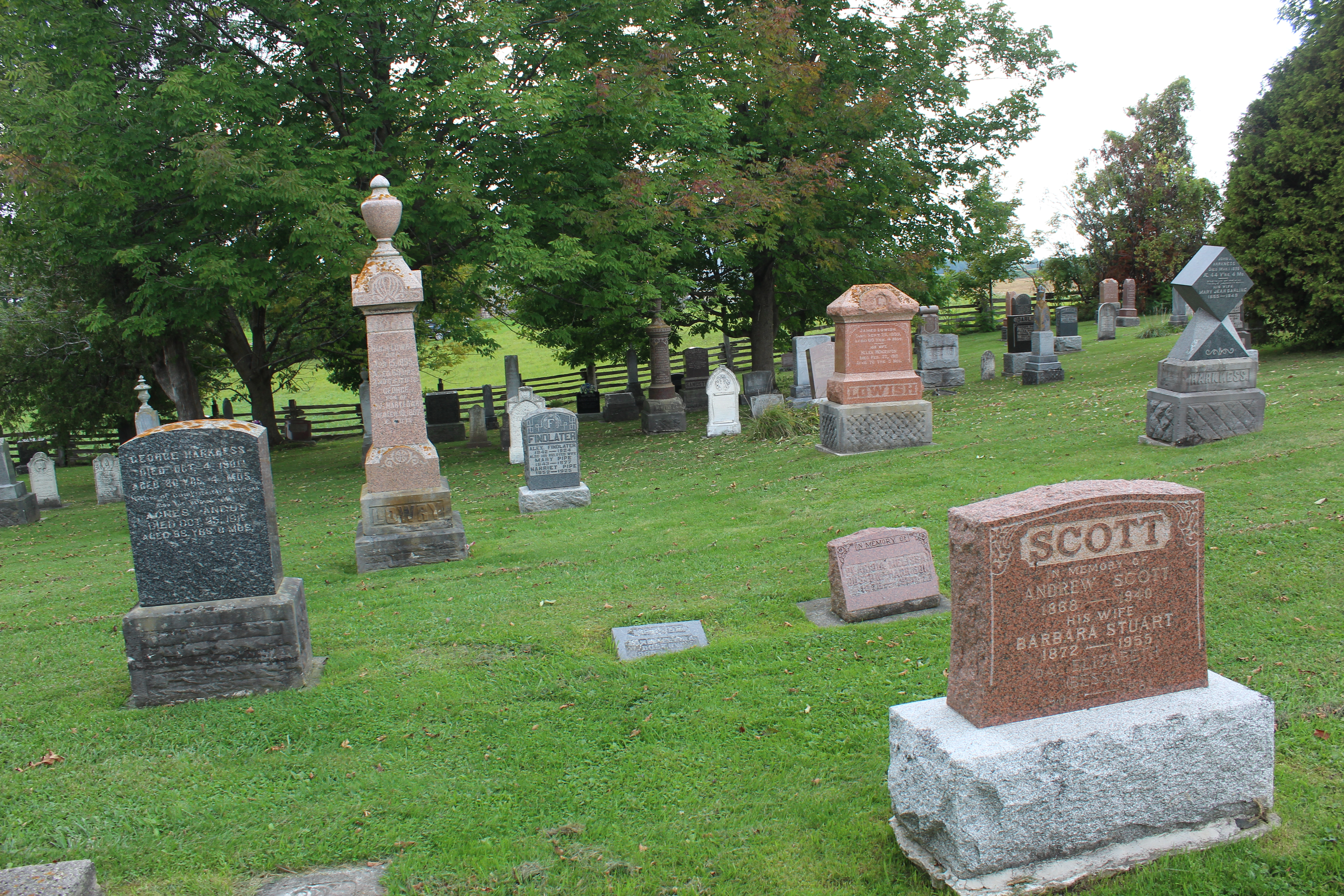
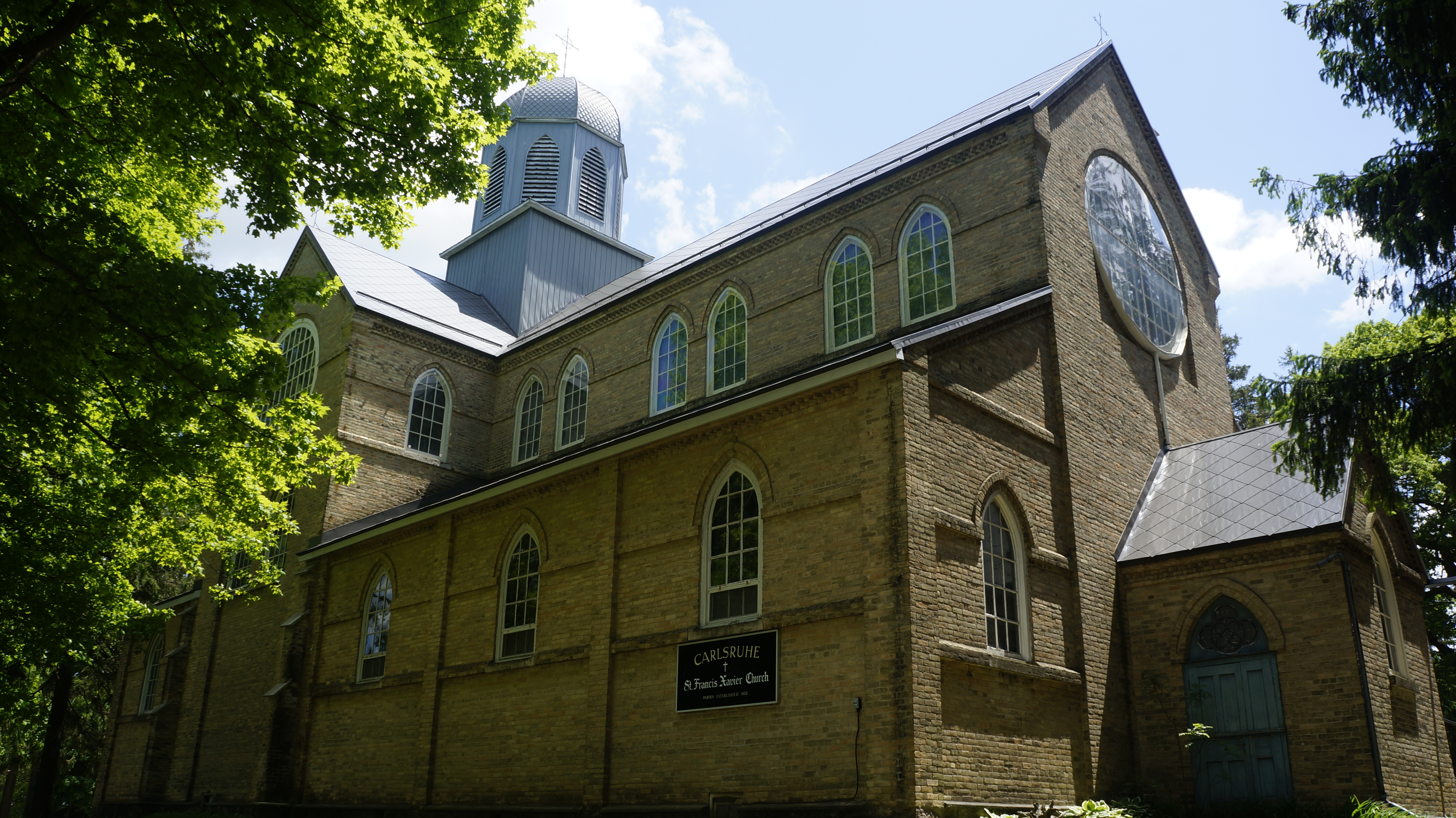
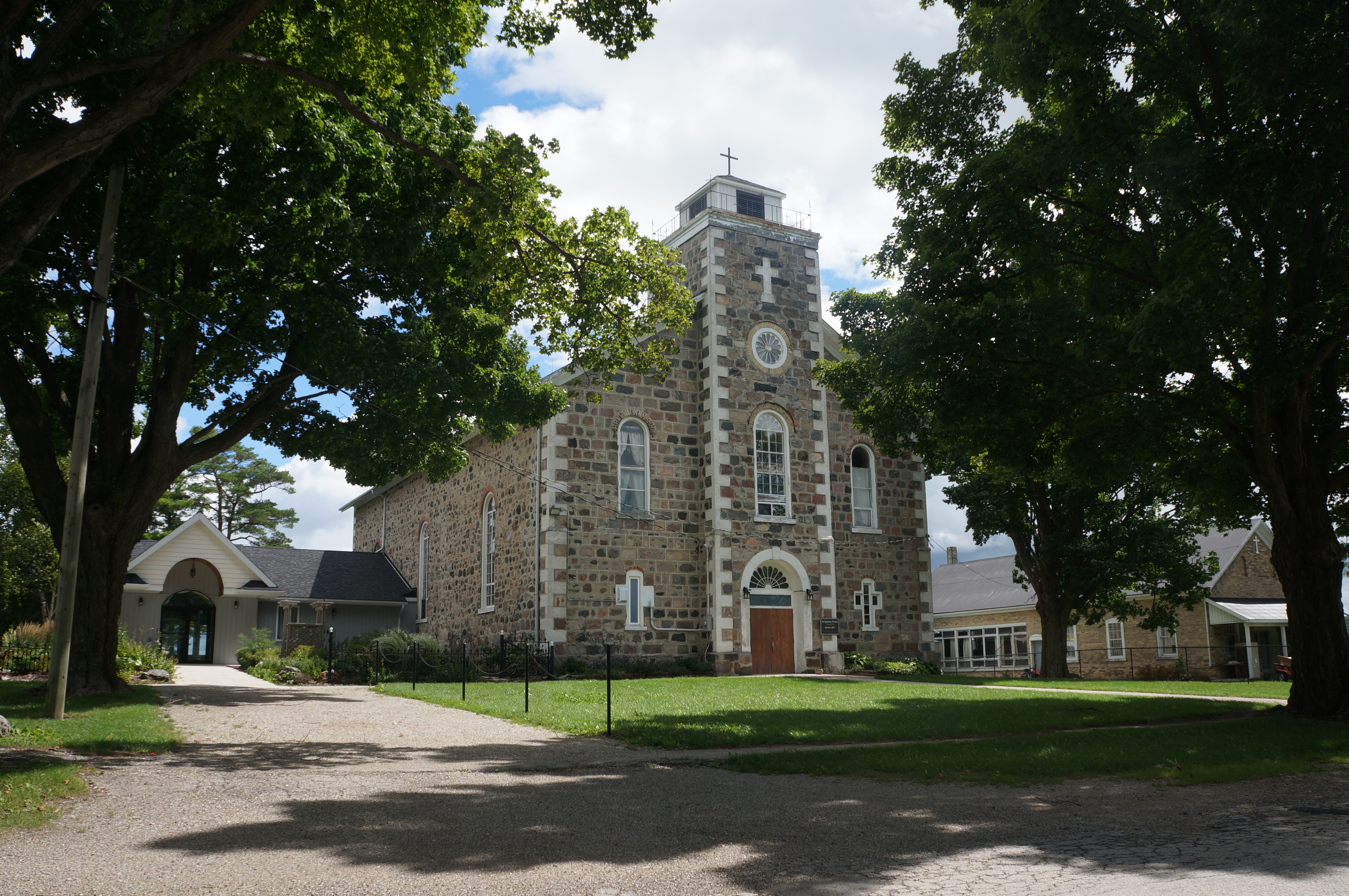
- South Bruce Town Hall, Teeswater Formosa Mildmay McIntosh United Cemetery, Salem St. Francis Xavier Church, Carlsruhe St. lgnatius Deemerton Retreat Centre, Deemerton

- Location within Bruce County Location within Southern Ontario
- Coordinates: 44°02′N 81°12′W
- Country: Canada
- Province: Ontario
- County: Bruce
- Formed: January 1, 1999

Government
  - Mayor: Mark Goetz
  - Federal riding: Huron—Bruce
  - Prov. riding: Huron—Bruce

Area
  - Land: 486.86 km^{2} (187.98 sq mi)

Population (2021)
  - Total: 5,880
  - Density: 12.1/km^{2} (31/sq mi)
- Time zone: UTC-5 (EST)
  - Summer (DST): UTC-4 (EDT)
- Area codes: 519 and 226
- Website: www.town.southbruce.on.ca

South Bruce is not to be confused with the Town of South Bruce Peninsula

South Bruce is a municipality in Bruce County, Ontario, Canada.

== History ==
South Bruce was created in 1999 as part of county-wide municipal restructuring. In 1998, the Township of Culross and the Village of Teeswater amalgamated to form the Township of Teeswater-Culross. Similarly, the Village of Mildmay joined with the Township of Carrick to form the Township of Mildmay-Carrick. The following year, both Mildmay-Carrick and Teeswater-Culross amalgamated again to form South Bruce, choosing Teeswater as the seat of the municipality.

South Bruce is one of two Ontario communities being considered as a potential deep geological repository site for Canada's used nuclear fuel.

== Communities ==
The two main population centres in South Bruce are Mildmay and Teeswater. Other communities within the municipal boundaries are Carlsruhe, Deemerton, Formosa and Salem.

== Demographics ==
In the 2021 Census of Population conducted by Statistics Canada, South Bruce had a population of 5,880 living in 2,280 of its 2,419 total private dwellings, a change of 4.3% from its 2016 population of 5,639. With a land area of 486.86 km^{2} (187.98 sq mi), it had a population density of 12.1/km^{2} (31.3/sq mi) in 2021.

Canada census – South Bruce, Ontario community profile

	2021	2016	2011
Population	5,880 (+4.3% from 2016)	5,639 (-0.8% from 2011)	5,685 (-4.3% from 2006)
Land area	486.86 km^{2} (187.98 sq mi)	487.48 km^{2} (188.22 sq mi)	487.27 km^{2} (188.14 sq mi)
Population density	12.1/km^{2} (31/sq mi)	11.6/km^{2} (30/sq mi)	11.7/km^{2} (30/sq mi)
Median age	41.2 (M: 40.8, F: 41.6)	42.2 (M: 42.1, F: 42.3)
Private dwellings	2,419 (total) 2,280 (occupied)	2,381 (total)	2,346 (total)
Median household income	$88,000	$71,270

References: 2021 2016 2011

Historical census populations – South Bruce, Ontario
Year	Pop.	±%
2001	6,063	—
2006	5,939	−2.0%
2011	5,685	−4.3%
2016	5,639	−0.8%
2021	5,880	+4.3%
Source: Statistics Canada

Population trend prior to amalgamation:

- Population total in 1996: 6,248
  - Carrick (township): 2,431
  - Culross (township): 1,638
  - Mildmay (village): 1,110
  - Teeswater (village): 1,069
- Population in 1991:
  - Carrick (township): 2,378
  - Culross (township): 1,636
  - Mildmay (village): 1,095
  - Teeswater (village): 1,066

== See also ==
- 2018 Bruce County municipal elections
- List of townships in Ontario
