= Henry Cargill =

Canadian politician

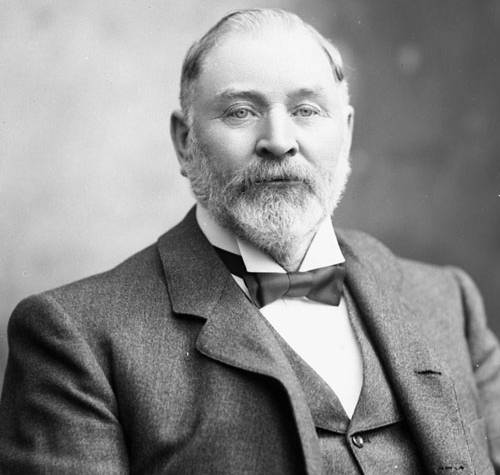
Henry Cargill Source: Library and Archives Canada

Henry Cargill (August 13, 1838 – October 1, 1903) was a pioneering Ontario industrialist, farmer and political figure. The village of Cargill in Bruce County, where he established a lumber industry to log the nearby Greenock Swamp, is named after him. He represented Bruce East in the House of Commons of Canada from 1887 to 1891 and from 1892 to 1903 as a Conservative member.

He was born in Nassagaweya Township, Upper Canada, the son of David Cargill, an Irish immigrant. Cargill studied at Queen's College and entered his father's lumber business in Halton County, moving to Bruce County in 1879 after purchasing a large parcel of land known as the Greenock Swamp which contained large stands of white pine. In 1864, he had married Margaret Davidson.

Cargill established mills to process the timber, also establishing a woollen mill and a general store. Cargill built community institutions as well as industries in Cargill, establishing the village's first school, library, community hall and fire department. Cargill also raised shorthorn cattle and bred racehorses. The village of Cargill developed as the result of his efforts in the area. He served as reeve for Greenock Township from 1884 to 1886 and also served as village postmaster. He was defeated in 1891 but appealed and won the subsequent by-election in 1892. Cargill died in the House of Commons in Ottawa in 1903.

His daughter Margaret married William Humphrey Bennett, who later served in the federal parliament. His youngest daughter Henrietta married Wilson Mills Southam, son of William Southam. His son Wellington David carried on his father's business, founded the Dominion Well Supply Company, and went on to serve as a Member of Provincial Parliament.
