= Ralph Eichler =

Canadian politician

Minister of Agriculture and Resource Development
- In office July 15, 2021 – January 18, 2022
- Premier: Brian Pallister; Kelvin Goertzen; Heather Stefanson
- Preceded by: Blaine Pedersen
- Succeeded by: Derek Johnson

Minister of Economic Development and Jobs
- In office January 5, 2021 – July 15, 2021
- Premier: Brian Pallister
- Preceded by: Portfolio Renamed
- Succeeded by: Jon Reyes

Minister of Economic Development and Training
- In office October 23, 2019 – January 5, 2021
- Premier: Brian Pallister
- Preceded by: Blaine Pedersen
- Succeeded by: Portfolio Renamed

Minister of Agriculture
- In office May 3, 2016 – October 23, 2019
- Premier: Brian Pallister
- Preceded by: Ron Kostyshyn
- Succeeded by: Blaine Pedersen

Member of the Legislative Assembly of Manitoba for Lakeside
- In office June 3, 2003 – September 5, 2023
- Preceded by: Harry Enns
- Succeeded by: Trevor King

Personal details
- Born: March 23, 1950 (age 76)
- Party: Progressive Conservative
- Occupation: Businessperson, school administrator

Ralph Eichler (born March 23, 1950) is a retired Canadian politician. From 2003 until 2023, he was the member of Legislative Assembly of Manitoba for the riding of Lakeside.

== Early life and career ==
Before entering provincial politics, Eichler served for eight years as the administrator of the Interlake School Division. He also owned and operated Prairie Farm Ranch Supply, an exporter of livestock handling equipment. In the latter capacity, he oversaw the invention of a device known as "The Stockdoctor", now used internationally. Eichler has also served as a director of the Prairie Implements Manufacturers Association and the Teulon Golf and Country Club, as well as serving as president of the Interlake Riding Club.

== Political career ==
In the 2003 Manitoba general election, Eichler was elected to the Manitoba legislature as a Progressive Conservative, defeating New Democrat Robert Marshall by 4,102 votes to 3,012. He was only the third person to hold the riding in 81 years. For the first 47 years after the creation of the district, Douglas Lloyd Campbell had represented it, and following Campbell's retirement, Harry Enns represented it for 34 years. Eichler himself was nominated and elected following Enns' retirement.

The NDP government was re-elected in 2003, and Eichler sat in opposition until 2016.

He was re-elected in the 2007, 2011, and 2016 provincial elections.

On May 3, 2016, after the new Progressive Conservative government under the leadership of Brian Pallister was sworn in, Eichler was appointed to the Executive Council of Manitoba as Minister of Agriculture.

He was re-elected in the 2019 election.

On October 4, 2022 he announced he would not seek re-election in the 43rd provincial election and would serve the rest of his term. He retired with the call of the 2023 election.

== Electoral record ==
2019 Manitoba general election: Lakeside
Party	Candidate	Votes	%	±%	Expenditures
Progressive Conservative	Ralph Eichler	6,409	68.24	-11.8	$18,395.34
New Democratic	Dan Rugg	2,089	22.24	+5.8	$2,433.39
Liberal	Ilsa Regelsky	894	9.52	+5.9	$0.00
Total valid votes		9,392	98.88	–	
Rejected		106	1.12		
Turnout		9,498	59.22		
Eligible voters		16,039			
Progressive Conservative hold		Swing		-8.8	
Source(s) Source: Manitoba. Chief Electoral Officer (2019). Statement of Votes for the 42nd Provincial General Election, September 10, 2019 (PDF) (Report). Winnipeg: Elections Manitoba. "Candidate Election Returns". Elections Manitoba. Elections Manitoba.

2016 Manitoba general election: Lakeside
Party	Candidate	Votes	%	±%
Progressive Conservative	Ralph Eichler	6,077	81.61	15.81
New Democratic	Matt Austman	1,369	18.39	-7.51
Total valid votes		7,446	–	–
Rejected		272	–	
Eligible voters / turnout		13,357	57.78	0.66
Source(s) Source: Manitoba. Chief Electoral Officer (2016). Statement of Votes for the 41st Provincial General Election, April 19, 2016 (PDF) (Report). Winnipeg: Elections Manitoba. "Election Returns: 41st General Election". Elections Manitoba. 2016.

2011 Manitoba general election: Lakeside
Party	Candidate	Votes	%	±%	Expenditures
Progressive Conservative	Ralph Eichler	5,043	65.80	9.61	$16,402.48
New Democratic	Rosemary Hnatiuk	1,985	25.90	-7.34	$6,166.66
Green	Betty Kehler	379	4.95	0.54	$423.06
Liberal	Jerald Funk	257	3.35	-2.81	$1,578.68
Total valid votes		7,664	–	–	
Rejected		19	–		
Eligible voters / turnout		13,451	57.12	-0.52	
Source(s) Source: Manitoba. Chief Electoral Officer (2011). Statement of Votes for the 40th Provincial General Election, October 4, 2011 (PDF) (Report). Winnipeg: Elections Manitoba. "Election Returns: 40th General Election". Elections Manitoba. 2011.

2007 Manitoba general election: Lakeside
Party	Candidate	Votes	%	±%	Expenditures
Progressive Conservative	Ralph Eichler	4,448	56.19	3.23	$25,444.44
New Democratic	Mitch Obach	2,631	33.24	-5.61	$5,039.43
Liberal	Ian Band	488	6.16	-2.03	$340.29
Green	David Carey	349	4.41	–	$39.55
Total valid votes		7,916	–	–	
Rejected		37	–		
Eligible voters / turnout		13,798	57.64	1.25	
Source(s) Source: Manitoba. Chief Electoral Officer (2007). Statement of Votes for the 39th Provincial General Election, May 22, 2007 (PDF) (Report). Winnipeg: Elections Manitoba.

2003 Manitoba general election: Lakeside
Party	Candidate	Votes	%	±%
Progressive Conservative	Ralph Eichler	4,110	52.96	4.21
New Democratic	Robert B. Marshall	3,015	38.85	8.17
Liberal	Louis Allain	636	8.19	-9.93
Total valid votes		7,761	–	–
Rejected		36	–	
Eligible voters / Turnout		13,828	56.39	-11.60
Source(s) Source: Manitoba. Chief Electoral Officer (2003). Statement of Votes for the 38th Provincial General Election, June 3, 2003 (PDF) (Report). Winnipeg: Elections Manitoba.
