= John Biggar =

John Biggar may refer to:

- John Biggar (Scottish politician) (1874–1943)
- John Walter Scott Biggar (1843–1897), Ontario political figure
- John Biggar (mountaineer) (born 1964), Scottish mountaineer
