= Robert Bend =

Canadian politician (1914–1999)

Leader of the Manitoba Liberal Party
- In office 10 May 1969 – 25 June 1969
- Preceded by: Gildas Molgat
- Succeeded by: Stan Roberts (interim)

Manitoba Minister of Health and Public Welfare
- In office 25 January 1955 – 30 June 1958
- Premier: Douglas Lloyd Campbell
- Preceded by: Francis Bell
- Succeeded by: George Johnson

Member of the Legislative Assembly of Manitoba
- In office 16 June 1958 – 14 May 1959
- Preceded by: New constituency
- Constituency: Rockwood—Iberville
- In office 10 November 1949 – 16 June 1958
- Preceded by: W. J. Campbell
- Succeeded by: Constituency abolished
- Constituency: Rockwood

Personal details
- Born: Robert William Bend; 16 April 1914 Poplar Point, Manitoba, Canada
- Died: 24 September 1999 (aged 85) Stonewall, Manitoba, Canada
- Party: Progressive Conservative (1949–?); Independent Liberal-Progressive (c. 1953 – ?); Liberal (from bef. 1970)
- Spouse: Laura Kathleen Fisher (m. 1938)
- Education: University of Manitoba
- Occupation: School administrator
- Nickname: Bobby Bend

Robert William Bend (1914–1999), also known as Bobby Bend, was a Canadian politician, and was briefly the leader of the Manitoba Liberal Party in 1969.

== Biography ==
=== Early life ===
Bend was born on 16 April 1914 in Poplar Point, Manitoba, the son of J. P. Bend (who unsuccessfully ran for the Manitoba legislature in 1927 and 1932 as a Conservative) and Annie Ada Wilson. The younger Bend received a Bachelor of Science degree from the University of Manitoba, taught school and later worked as a school principal. He later received a Bachelor of Education degree from the University of Manitoba. In 1938, Bend married Laura Kathleen Fisher.

=== Politics ===
In 1949, Bend was elected to the Manitoba legislature for the riding of Rockwood. The election was somewhat unusual, in that Bend ran as an "Independent Progressive Conservative" supporting the Liberal-Progressive-Progressive Conservative governing coalition, while his opponent R. A. Quickfall was an Independent Liberal opposing the government. Bend won with over two-thirds of the vote.

The Progressive Conservatives left the governing coalition in 1950, but Bend continued to support the government of Liberal-Progressive Premier Douglas Campbell. He scored an easy re-election in 1953, this time running as an "Independent Liberal-Progressive". On 25 January 1955, he was named Minister of Health and Public Welfare in the Campbell government.

=== Defeat and retirement ===
The Progressive Conservatives under Dufferin Roblin won a minority government in 1958, though Bend was again re-elected in the renamed riding of Rockwood—Ibreville. The following year, however, he was defeated by Tory candidate George Hutton.

Bend remained out of active political life for the next decade. In 1969, he stood for the leadership of the Manitoba Liberal Party (as the Liberal-Progressives had renamed themselves), and scored an easily first-ballot win over his three opponents (none of whom had legislative experience).

The selection of Bend proved to be a strategic error for the party. Bend represented the rural populist wing of the Liberal Party, and was unable to reach an urban audience. Under his influence, the party adopted a "cowboy"/"rodeo" theme for the campaign, which made it look and sound dated. The Liberals tumbled to only five seats, the fewest they had ever won. Bend himself was narrowly defeated by Progressive Conservative candidate Harry Enns in the riding of Lakeside (which Campbell had previously held for 47 years). He stepped down as Liberal leader shortly thereafter, and did not seek provincial office again.

Bend subsequently returned to the education field, serving as superintendent of a rural school division. He died at Rosewood Lodge in Stonewall on 24 September 1999 at the age of 85.

Bend spent 50 years as a baseball umpire and was inducted into the Manitoba Baseball Hall of Fame in 1997.

There is currently an elementary school named after him in Stonewall, Manitoba, called "École R.W. Bobby Bend School".
