= William Fenton =

William Fenton is the name of:

- William M. Fenton (1808–1871), American politician from Michigan
- William N. Fenton (1908–2005), anthropologist
- William Robert Fenton (1923–2013), New Zealand politician
- William Fenton (cricketer) (born 1943), New Zealand cricketer
- William Henry Fenton, Canadian politician
- Billy Fenton (1926–1973), English footballer
