= Rural Municipality of Woodlands =

Rural municipality in Manitoba, Canada

- Rural municipality
- Location of the RM of Woodlands in Manitoba
- Coordinates: 50°14′27″N 97°44′09″W
- Country: Canada
- Province: Manitoba
- Region: Interlake
- Incorporated: February 14, 1884

Government
  - Reeve: Lori Schellekens
  - MP (Selkirk—Interlake—Eastman): James Bezan
  - MLA (Lakeside): Trevor King

Area
  - Total: 1,197.59 km^{2} (462.39 sq mi)

Population (2021)
  - Total: 3,797
- Time zone: UTC-6 (CST)
  - Summer (DST): UTC-5 (CDT)
- Website: rmwoodlands.ca

Woodlands is a rural municipality (RM) in the province of Manitoba in Western Canada. It lies in the southern part of the Interlake and is named for the community of Woodlands, which itself is named for the wooded lands of the area.

== History ==
The Rural Municipality of Woodlands was incorporated on February 14, 1884.

== Geography ==
=== Communities ===
- Erinview
- Lake Francis
- Marquette
- Reaburn
- Warren
- Woodlands

=== Climate ===
Climate data for Marquette
Month	Jan	Feb	Mar	Apr	May	Jun	Jul	Aug	Sep	Oct	Nov	Dec	Year
Record high °C (°F)	8 (46)	9.4 (48.9)	17.2 (63.0)	36.1 (97.0)	37.8 (100.0)	38 (100)	35 (95)	38.5 (101.3)	37.5 (99.5)	31 (88)	23.9 (75.0)	10.6 (51.1)	38.5 (101.3)
Mean daily maximum °C (°F)	−12.6 (9.3)	−8.1 (17.4)	−0.9 (30.4)	10.1 (50.2)	19.3 (66.7)	23.3 (73.9)	25.6 (78.1)	24.9 (76.8)	18.5 (65.3)	10.8 (51.4)	−0.9 (30.4)	−9.8 (14.4)	8.4 (47.1)
Daily mean °C (°F)	−17.5 (0.5)	−13.2 (8.2)	−5.8 (21.6)	4.1 (39.4)	12.4 (54.3)	17.1 (62.8)	19.6 (67.3)	18.6 (65.5)	12.6 (54.7)	5.6 (42.1)	−4.9 (23.2)	−14.3 (6.3)	2.9 (37.2)
Mean daily minimum °C (°F)	−22.3 (−8.1)	−18.2 (−0.8)	−10.7 (12.7)	−1.9 (28.6)	5.5 (41.9)	10.9 (51.6)	13.5 (56.3)	12.1 (53.8)	6.7 (44.1)	0.4 (32.7)	−8.9 (16.0)	−18.8 (−1.8)	−2.6 (27.3)
Record low °C (°F)	−39.5 (−39.1)	−41 (−42)	−33.3 (−27.9)	−27.8 (−18.0)	−9 (16)	−0.5 (31.1)	2.8 (37.0)	1.1 (34.0)	−5 (23)	−19 (−2)	−35 (−31)	−39.5 (−39.1)	−41 (−42)
Average precipitation mm (inches)	23.3 (0.92)	18.3 (0.72)	26.6 (1.05)	32.7 (1.29)	57.8 (2.28)	87.3 (3.44)	73.1 (2.88)	70.5 (2.78)	57 (2.2)	39.1 (1.54)	29.6 (1.17)	23.5 (0.93)	538.8 (21.21)
Source: Environment Canada

== Demographics ==
Population Growth

Year	Pop.	±%
1871	503	—
1881	500	−0.6%
1891	1,032	+106.4%
1896	987	−4.4%
1901	1,173	+18.8%
1911	1,539	+31.2%
1921	1,977	+28.5%
1931	2,008	+1.6%
1941	2,351	+17.1%
1951	2,041	−13.2%
1956	2,222	+8.9%
1961	2,346	+5.6%

Year	Pop.	±%
1966	2,157	−8.1%
1971	2,258	+4.7%
1976	2,558	+13.3%
1981	2,935	+14.7%
1986	3,188	+8.6%
1991	3,334	+4.6%
1996	3,457	+3.7%
2001	3,453	−0.1%
2006	3,562	+3.2%
2011	3,521	−1.2%
2016	3,416	−3.0%
2021	3,797	+11.2%

In the 2021 Census of Population conducted by Statistics Canada, Woodlands had a population of 3,797 living in 1,376 of its 1,483 total private dwellings, a change of 11.2% from its 2016 population of 3,416. With a land area of 1,197.59 km^{2} (462.39 sq mi), it had a population density of 3.2/km^{2} (8.2/sq mi) in 2021.

== Government ==
Woodlands federal election results
Year	Liberal		Conservative		New Democratic		Green	
2021	8%	156	69%	1,278	13%	241	2%	41
2019	7%	137	75%	1,403	11%	209	6%	108

Woodlands provincial election results
Year	PC		New Democratic		Liberal	
2019	74%	1,113	17%	255	9%	128
2016	85%	1,126	15%	201	0%	0

The Rural Municipality of Woodlands is municipal style government with one head of council and six councillors, one of which is the deputy reeve. The councillors are elected at large. The municipal offices are located in Woodlands. The municipalities lies within the federal riding of Selkirk—Interlake—Eastman, represented by Conservative James Bezan, and the provincial riding of Lakeside represented by Progressive Conservative Trevor King.

=== 2022 Members of Council ===
- Reeve: Douglas Oliver
- Councillor: Lorna Broadfoot
- Councillor: Carl Fleury
- Councillor: Darryl Langrell
- Councillor: Darrell Sincalir
- Councillor: Bryan Myskiw
- Councillor: Valerie Stelck

The representatives from the local urban district of Warren are Judy Olson, Diana Friesen, and Cal Martin.

== Transportation ==
The first rail line, the Air Line, connected Warren to Stonewall and Winnipeg, and later to Portage la Prairie, but was taken out of service in 1882. The Hudson Bay CPR line was built to Shoal Lake, but construction stopped after 1886 due to lack of funds. In the 1880s, multiple rail lines were built through the municipality to transport gravel from the ridges and pits, but were later abandoned once supply diminished. The Canadian Northern Railroad was built through the area from 1903 to 1904. The section north of Warren was abandoned beginning in 1996, but the section south remains in operation.

== See also ==
Twin Lakes Beach, Manitoba
