= Bruce North =

Bruce North could refer to:

- Bruce North (federal electoral district)
- Bruce North (provincial electoral district)
