= Edwin D. Lynch =

Canadian politician

Edwin D. Lynch (August 20, 1860 – April 18, 1941) was a politician in Manitoba, Canada. He served in the Legislative Assembly of Manitoba from 1903 to 1910, as a member of the Conservative Party.

Lynch was born in Middlesex County, Canada West (now Ontario), the son of William Lynch, and moved with his family to Manitoba in 1871. He moved to California in 1874 and was educated in Sacramento. He returned to Manitoba in 1883 and settled in Westbourne as a farmer. In 1885, Lynch married Christina Morrison. Together, they had five children including three daughters and two sons.

He first campaigned for the Manitoba legislature in the 1899 election, and lost to Manitoba Liberal Party candidate James MacKenzie in Lakeside by 16 votes. He tried again in the 1903 election, and defeated a new Liberal candidate by 68 votes. The Conservatives won this election, and Lynch served in the legislature as a backbench supporter of Rodmond Roblin's government. He was re-elected by 27 votes in 1907.

Lynch was defeated in the 1910 election, losing to Liberal candidate Charles McPherson by 68 votes.

He died in Winnipeg at the age of 80.
