= Bruce West (provincial electoral district) =

Ontario electoral district

Defunct provincial electoral district
- Legislature: Legislative Assembly of Ontario
- District created: 1914
- District abolished: 1925
- First contested: 1914
- Last contested: 1923

Bruce West was an electoral riding in Ontario, Canada. It was created in 1914 and was abolished in 1925 before the 1926 election.

== Members of Provincial Parliament ==
Bruce West
Assembly	Years	Member	Party
14th	1914–1919	Charles Martin Bowman	Liberal
15th	1919–1923	Alexander Patterson Mewhinney	Liberal
16th	1923–1926	Alexander Patterson Mewhinney	Liberal
Sourced from the Ontario Legislative Assembly
Merged into Bruce South and Bruce North before the 1926 election

== Election results ==
1923 Ontario general election
Party	Candidate	Votes	%	±%
Liberal	Alexander Patterson Mewhinney	2,582	38.73	–1.03
United Farmers	James Johnston	2,544	38.16	–0.30
Conservative	Alex G. MacIntyre	1,541	23.11	+1.32
Total valid votes		6,667	99.30	
Total rejected ballots		47	0.70	–1.30
Turnout		6,714	68.07	–12.58
Eligible voters		9,863		
Liberal hold		Swing		–0.36
Source: Elections Ontario

1919 Ontario general election
Party	Candidate	Votes	%	±%
Liberal	Alexander Patterson Mewhinney	3,094	39.75	–19.09
United Farmers	Gideon Henry Ruttle	2,993	38.46	–
Conservative	Charles Henry Green	1,696	21.79	–19.37
Total valid votes		7,783	98.00	
Total rejected ballots		159	2.00	+1.38
Turnout		7,942	80.65	–1.70
Eligible voters		9,847		
Liberal hold		Swing		–9.54
Source: Elections Ontario

1914 Ontario general election
Party	Candidate	Votes	%
Liberal	Charles Martin Bowman	2,153	58.84
Conservative	Charles Henry Green	1,506	41.16
Total valid votes		3,659	99.38
Total rejected ballots		23	0.62
Turnout		3,682	82.35
Eligible voters		4,471	
Liberal pickup new district.			
Source: Elections Ontario
