= Alexander Sproat =

Canadian politician

Alexander Sproat (June 19, 1834 – August 20, 1890) was an Ontario land surveyor, businessman and political figure. He represented Bruce North in the 1st Canadian Parliament as a Conservative member.

== Biography ==
He was born near Milton in Halton County, Upper Canada, in 1834, son of Adam Sproat and Eleanor Brown. He studied at Knox College and Queen's College. He came to Southampton around 1856 as a provincial surveyor and ended up the agent of the Commercial Bank of Canada (his future father-in-law, as well as Crown lands agent, was the agent of the Bank of Upper Canada, so in effect Alexander's direct competition). He married Alexander McNabb's daughter Eliza in 1861 in Southampton. They were the parents of Marion, Adam, Eleanor. Two other children, Margaret and Mary died in infancy and are buried in Southampton.

In 1864, he was appointed treasurer for Bruce County, a position he held until 1873. He served as colonel with the Southampton Rifles during the Fenian Raids. In 1866, the volunteer companies of the County Bruce were formed into the 32nd Battalion of Infantry and Alex was made lieutenant colonel in command. In 1867, Alex was elected Conservative MP for North Bruce and sat in the first House of Commons after Confederation (which sat between September 24, 1867, and July 8, 1872). In 1872 he lost his bid for re-election by a handful of votes. He also served as the mayor of Walkerton in 1876 and also served a term as reeve.

By 1880, Alexander and his family had moved west to Prince Albert. In that year, he was named registrar for the District of Prince Albert in the District of Saskatchewan. He helped found the Curling Club of Saskatchewan and served as its first president. He organized and served as the first lodge master of L.O.L. No. 1506, the first Orange Lodge in the District of Alberta in 1882. When the North-West Rebellion broke out in 1885 the Prince Albert Volunteers, who were sent to Duck Lake, were sworn in by Colonel Sproat, his son Adam (Bruce) among them. His brother-in-law Alexander McNabb was wounded in the battle and his friend John Morton was killed.

Alexander Sproat died at Prince Albert on August 17, 1890.

Parliament of Canada
Preceded by The electoral district was created by the British North America Act, 1867.	Member of Parliament for Bruce North; 1867–1872	Succeeded by John Gillies
