= Kenneth McKenzie (Manitoba politician) =

Scottish-Canadian politician (1822–1911)

Kenneth McKenzie (January 5, 1822 – April 5, 1911) was a Scottish-born rancher and political figure in Manitoba. He represented Portage la Prairie from 1874 to 1878, Burnside from 1878 to 1879 and Lakeside from 1886 to 1892 in the Legislative Assembly of Manitoba as a Liberal.

He was born in Inverness-shire, the son of John McKenzie, and was educated in Ross-shire and at Dunfermline Academy. McKenzie came to Puslinch township, Ontario as a young man and married Jane Condy in 1844. He came to the Red River Colony around 1867 and settled near Portage la Prairie in 1869. McKenzie represented St. Mary's in Riel's Convention of Forty in 1870. With Walter Lynch, he is credited with bringing the first registered shorthorn cattle into the province. McKenzie was president of the Provincial Agricultural and Arts Society of Manitoba and of the Marquette Agricultural Society. He was also the first postmaster at Burnside. He helped form the Portage Mutual Insurance Company and served as its first president.

His son James also served in the Manitoba assembly and his daughter Jean married James Daniel Gillies.

McKenzie was named to the Manitoba Agricultural Hall of Fame.
