= John George (Ontario MPP) =

Member of the Ontario Provincial Parliament for Bruce North
- In office June 5, 1890 – March 3, 1891
- Preceded by: John Walter Scott Biggar
- Succeeded by: David Porter

Personal details
- Party: Conservative

John George was a Canadian politician from Ontario. He represented Bruce North in the Legislative Assembly of Ontario from 1890 to 1891.

== See also ==
- 7th Parliament of Ontario
