= Charles Martin Bowman =

Canadian politician (1863–1932)

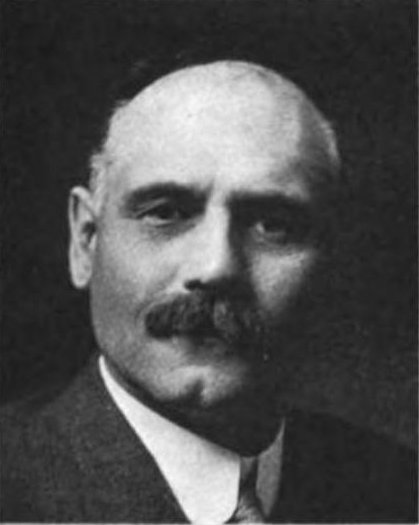

Ontario MPP
- In office 1914–1919
- Preceded by: New riding
- Succeeded by: Alexander Patterson Mewhinney
- Constituency: Bruce West
- In office 1898–1914
- Preceded by: Daniel McNaughton
- Succeeded by: William MacDonald
- Constituency: Bruce North

Personal details
- Born: May 7, 1863 St. Jacobs, Canada West
- Died: October 24, 1932 (aged 69) Kitchener, Ontario
- Party: Liberal
- Spouse: Louisa Hesse
- Occupation: Tanner

Charles Martin Bowman (May 7, 1863 – October 24, 1932) was a politician in Ontario, Canada. He was a Liberal member of the Legislative Assembly of Ontario who represented the ridings of Bruce North from 1898 to 1914 and Bruce West from 1914 to 1919.

== Background ==
Bowman was born in St. Jacobs, Canada West, the son of Isaac Erb Bowman and Lydia Bowers, and educated there and in Berlin (later Kitchener, Ontario). He entered his father's tanning business and set up a tannery in Southampton in 1880. After a fire destroyed that business, he purchased a tannery at Port Elgin. He went on to operate a furniture business in Southampton. With James Conmee, Bowman was awarded a contract for construction on the Algoma Central Railway. In 1902 he and James Whalen, son-in-law of Liberal M.P. James Conmee, formed the Great Lakes Dredging Company, obtaining large contracts to dredge the Fort William and Port Arthur harbours. In 1886, he married Louisa Hesse. He resided in Southampton, Saugeen Township, Bruce County in 1920, continuing his involvement in the leather business. He died in Kitchener, Ontario in 1932.

== Politics ==
Bowman served on the town council for Southampton and also served as reeve for the town.

In the 1898 provincial election, he ran as the Liberal candidate in the riding of Bruce North. He defeated Conservative candidate D.M. Jormyn by 419 votes.
