= John J. Garland =

Canadian politician (1873–1925)

John James Garland (September 15, 1873 – March 9, 1925) was a politician in Manitoba, Canada. He served in the Legislative Assembly of Manitoba from 1914 to 1915, as a member of the Conservative Party.

Garland was born in Bell’s Corners, Ontario, the son of Absalom Garland, of Irish descent, and Isabelle Foster, and was educated in Ottawa, Ontario. He moved to Portage le Prairie in Manitoba in 1892, where he worked as a clerk and then manager in a retail business operated by his uncle, William Garland. He later became a partner and then took over ownership of the business after his uncle's death. Garland served as mayor of Portage la Prairie for two years, and was a city alderman for a further eight. He also was president of the local Board of Trade. In 1898, Garland married Kathleen Fox. In religion, he was a member of the Church of England.

He was elected to the Manitoba legislature in the 1914 provincial election, defeated Liberal candidate Charles D. McPherson by ten votes in the constituency of Lakeside. The Conservatives won a majority government, and Garland served as a backbench supporter of Rodmond Roblin's administration.

In 1915, the Roblin administration was forced to resign from office amid a serious corruption scandal. A new election was called, in which the Liberals won a landslide majority. Garland lost to Mcpherson by 163 votes.

He died in Portage la Prairie at the age of 51.
