= William McDonald (Ontario politician) =

Canadian politician from Ontario

Member of the Ontario Provincial Parliament for Bruce Centre
- In office June 29, 1914 – September 23, 1919
- Preceded by: Charles Martin Bowman
- Succeeded by: William Henry Fenton

Member of Parliament for Bruce North
- In office December 11, 1911 – May 29, 1914
- Preceded by: Hugh Clark
- Succeeded by: riding abolished

Personal details
- Party: Liberal

William McDonald was a Canadian politician from Ontario. He represented Bruce Centre from 1911 to 1914 and Bruce North in the Legislative Assembly of Ontario from 1914 to 1919.

== See also ==
- 14th Parliament of Ontario
