= Puslinch, Ontario =

Puslinch
- Township (lower-tier)
- Township of Puslinch
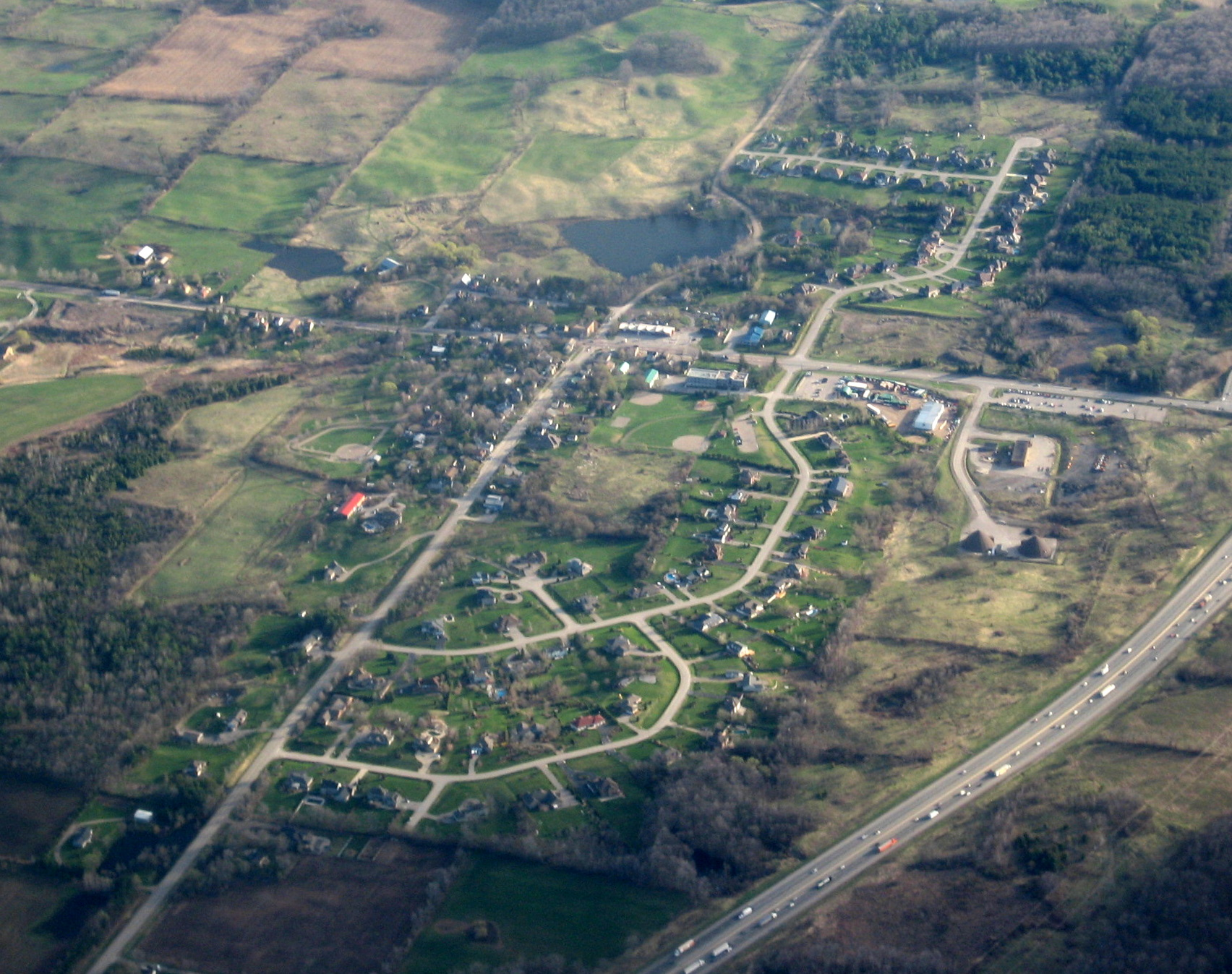
- Morriston

- Coat of arms

- Location within Wellington County Location within Southern Ontario
- Coordinates: 43°27′N 80°10′W
- Country: Canada
- Province: Ontario
- County: Wellington
- Incorporated: January 1, 1850

Government
  - Type: Township
  - Mayor: James Seeley
  - Governing Body: Township of Puslinch Council
  - MP: Mike Chong (CON)
  - MPP: Joseph Racinsky (PC)

Area
  - Land: 214.82 km^{2} (82.94 sq mi)

Population (2021)
  - Total: 7,944
  - Density: 37/km^{2} (96/sq mi)
- Time zone: UTC-5 (EST)
  - Summer (DST): UTC-4 (EDT)
- Postal Code FSA: N0B
- Area codes: 519, 226 and 548
- Website: www.puslinch.ca

Puslinch (/ˈpʊslɪntʃ/) is a township in south-central Ontario, Canada, in Wellington County, surrounding the south end of Guelph. The main source of production is agricultural, spring water bottling and mining. Aggregate mining has been dominant throughout the county. About half of the township is forested, and a conservation area lies to the southwest. Near the western edge of the township, just outside Cambridge, Ontario, is Puslinch Lake, the largest kettle lake in North America. It is part of the Guelph census metropolitan area.

The township has its own strategic plan, with the current version dated 2015 to 2020. Its mission statement is "Progressing together to provide reliable and sustainable services to our residents, businesses and visitors. We will protect our resources while respectfully building upon our heritage as a safe, fun and prosperous rural community."

== Communities ==
Puslinch township includes the communities of Aberfoyle, Aikensville, Arkell, Badenoch, Crieff, Glen Christie, Killean, Paddock's Corners, Morriston, Corwhin, Downey, Puslinch, and Puslinch Lake. The offices of the township are located at 7404 Wellington Road 34, Puslinch (village of Aberfoyle).

=== Aberfoyle ===
Aberfoyle is the administrative centre for Puslinch Township and is home to the municipality's administrative offices, and fire station. It is located at the headwaters of Mill Creek, which was important for early settlers to power their mills. The community is approximately three kilometres south of Guelph city limits on Brock Road, formerly a portion of old Hwy 6. Aberfoyle was first settled in the 1840s and is named for Aberfoyle, Scotland. In 1869, the population was only 100.

It is known for its spring water Aberfoyle Spring Water, which is bottled at the well in Aberfoyle. Nestlé bought the company in 2002, through its subsidiary Nestlé Waters North America and changed the name. In 2020, the company announced that it was selling the business to Ice River Springs of Shelburne, Ontario, but the deal failed and the company was later acquired spun off as BlueTriton Brands in 2021.

Other features include the Aberfoyle Antique Market, and Aberfoyle Public School.

=== Arkell ===
Arkell, pronounced "AR-kull", has a long relationship with beer brewing. Arkell was founded in 1830 by John Arkell, an Englishman who returned to the UK and founded Arkell's Brewery. Just north and east of the village runs the Arkell Spring Aquifer, renowned for its fresh spring water which has brought many beverage companies to the area, including Sleeman Breweries, Wellington Brewery, and F&M Brewery. Wellington Breweries named one of their beers 'Arkell Best Bitter' in honour of the prized water they use in their brewing. The Arkell Spring Grounds also provide some of the municipal water for the city of Guelph.

Arkell is a common stopping point for cyclists and hikers to take a break when touring the country-side roads the surrounding city of Guelph, or the hiking trails at the Starkey Hill loop just east of the village, or the Arkell Springs trail which stretches along the Eramosa River from Watson Rd. Just north of Arkell, east to nearby Eden Mills near the Eden Mills outdoor education centre and south-east to Arkell Rd. at the Nassagaweya-Puslinch Townline Rd. intersection, opened in 1974 by the Guelph Hiking Club.

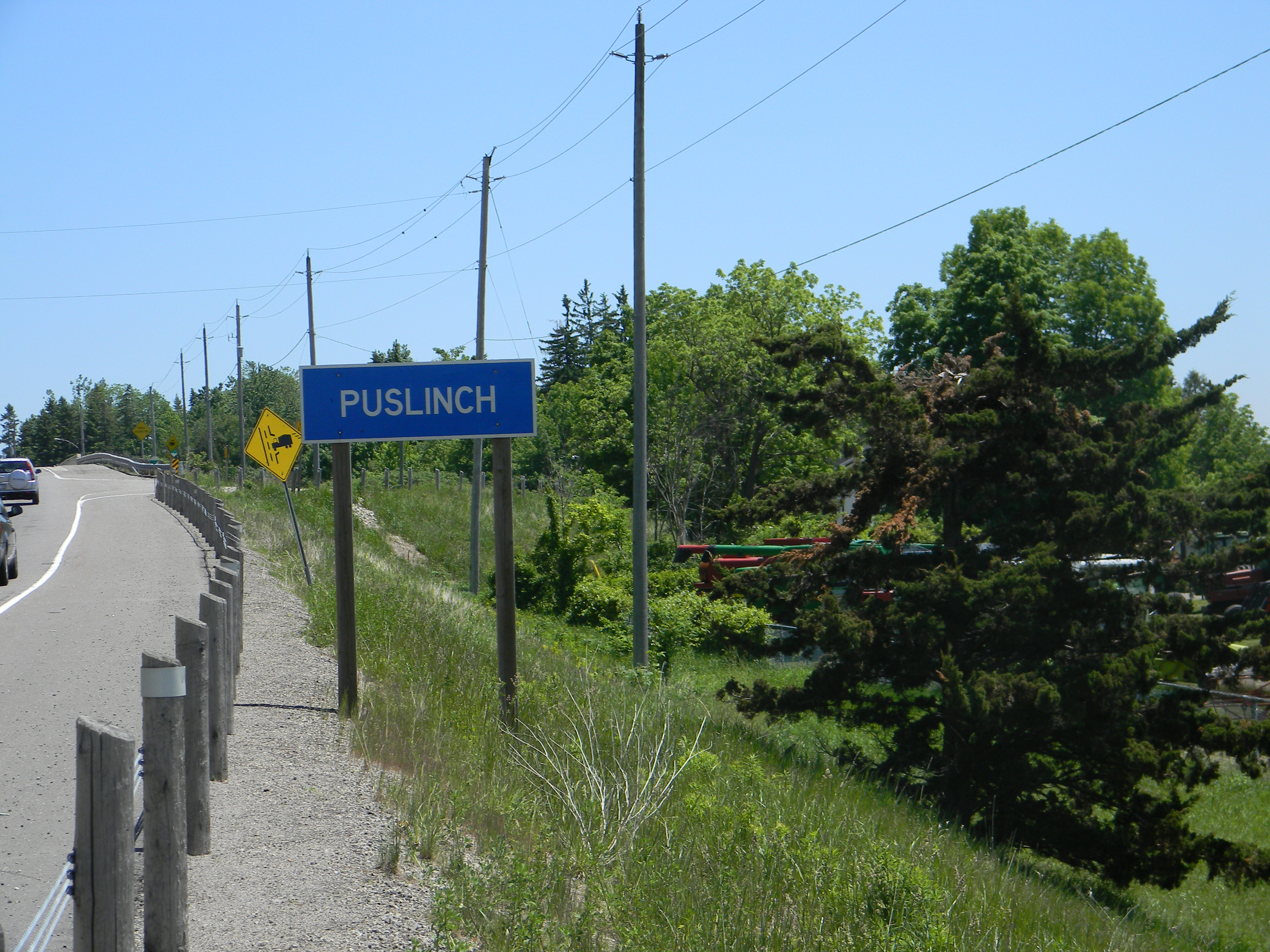
Puslinch

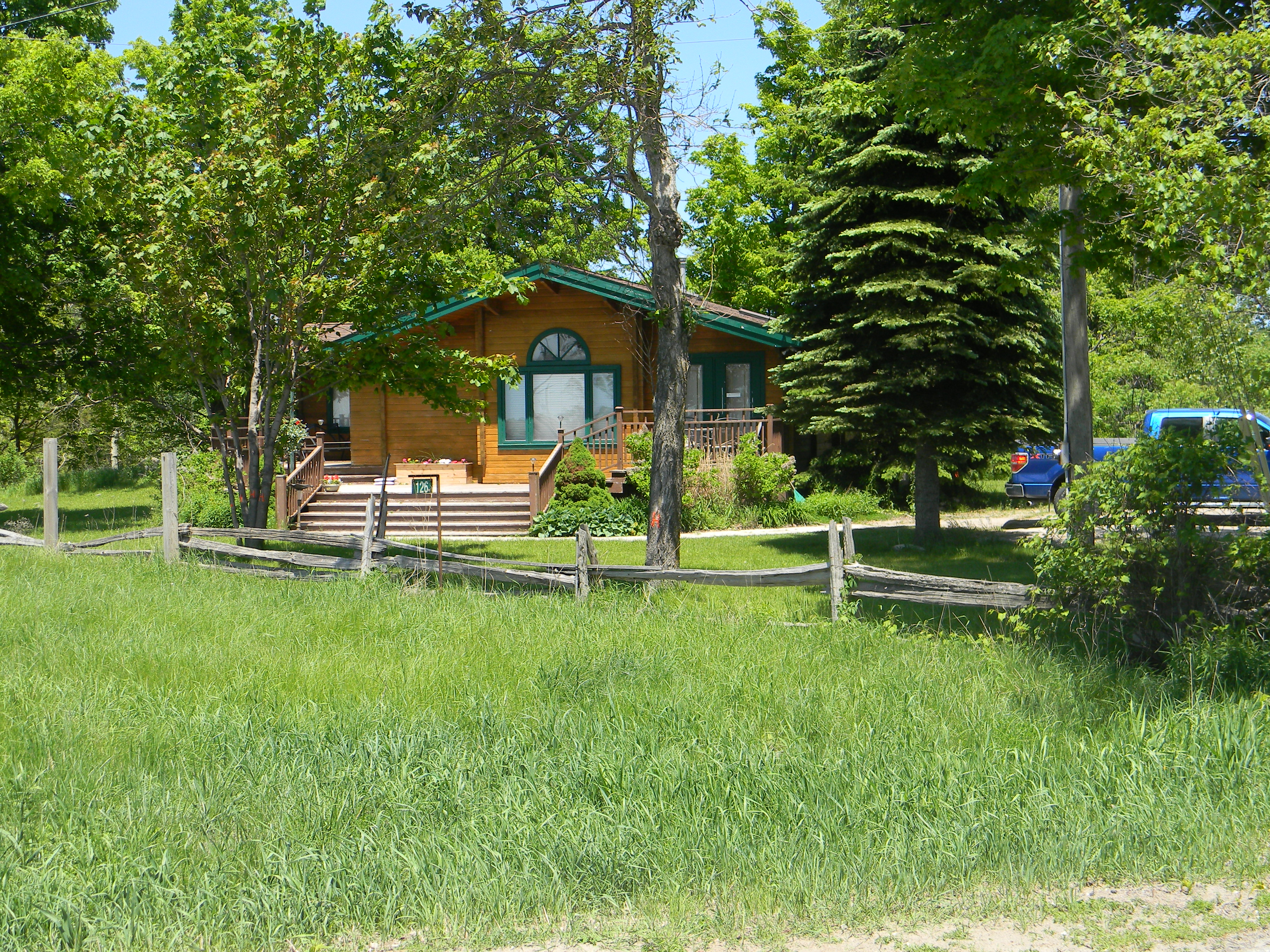
Aberfoyle house

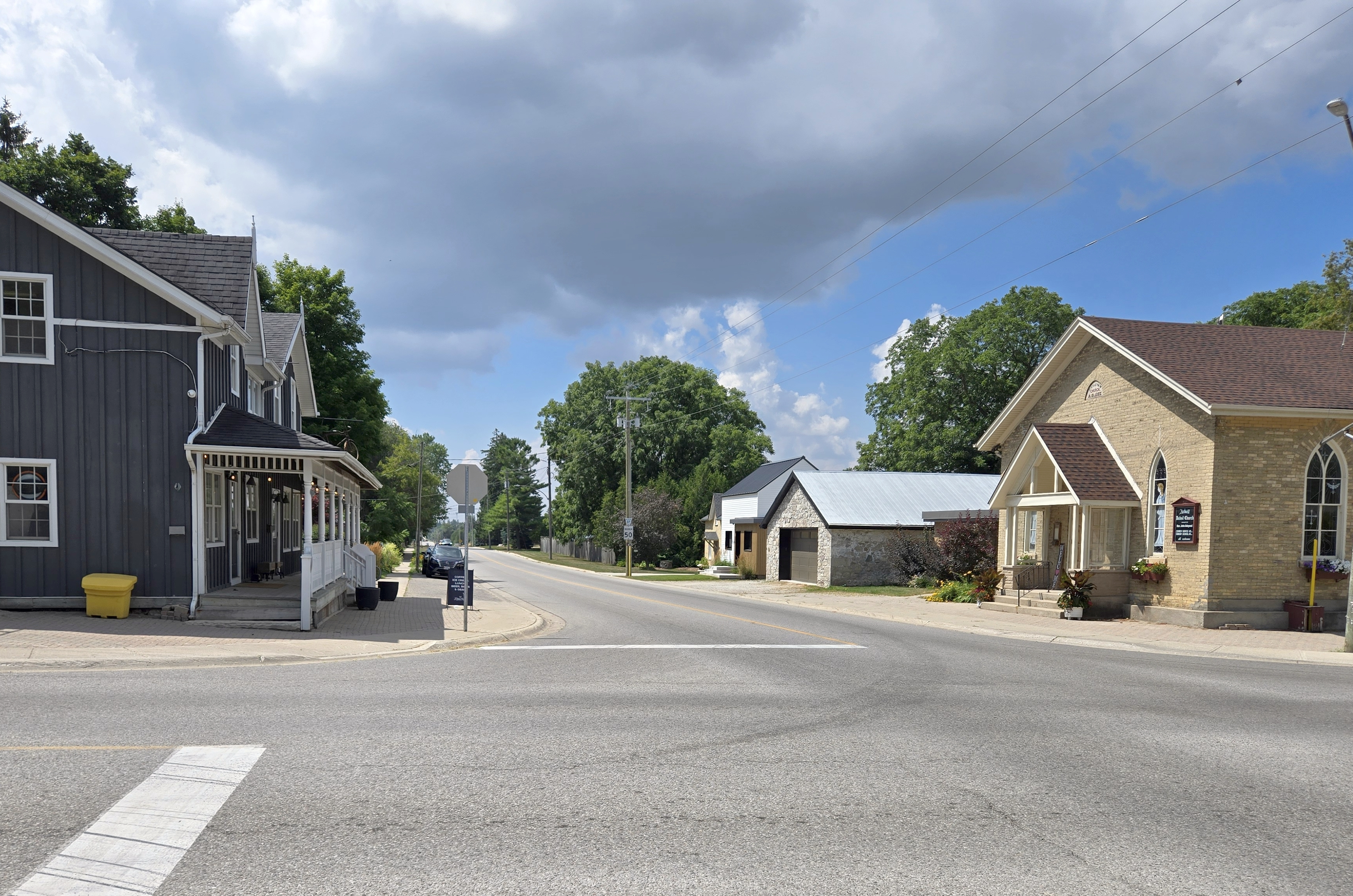
Arkell

== History ==
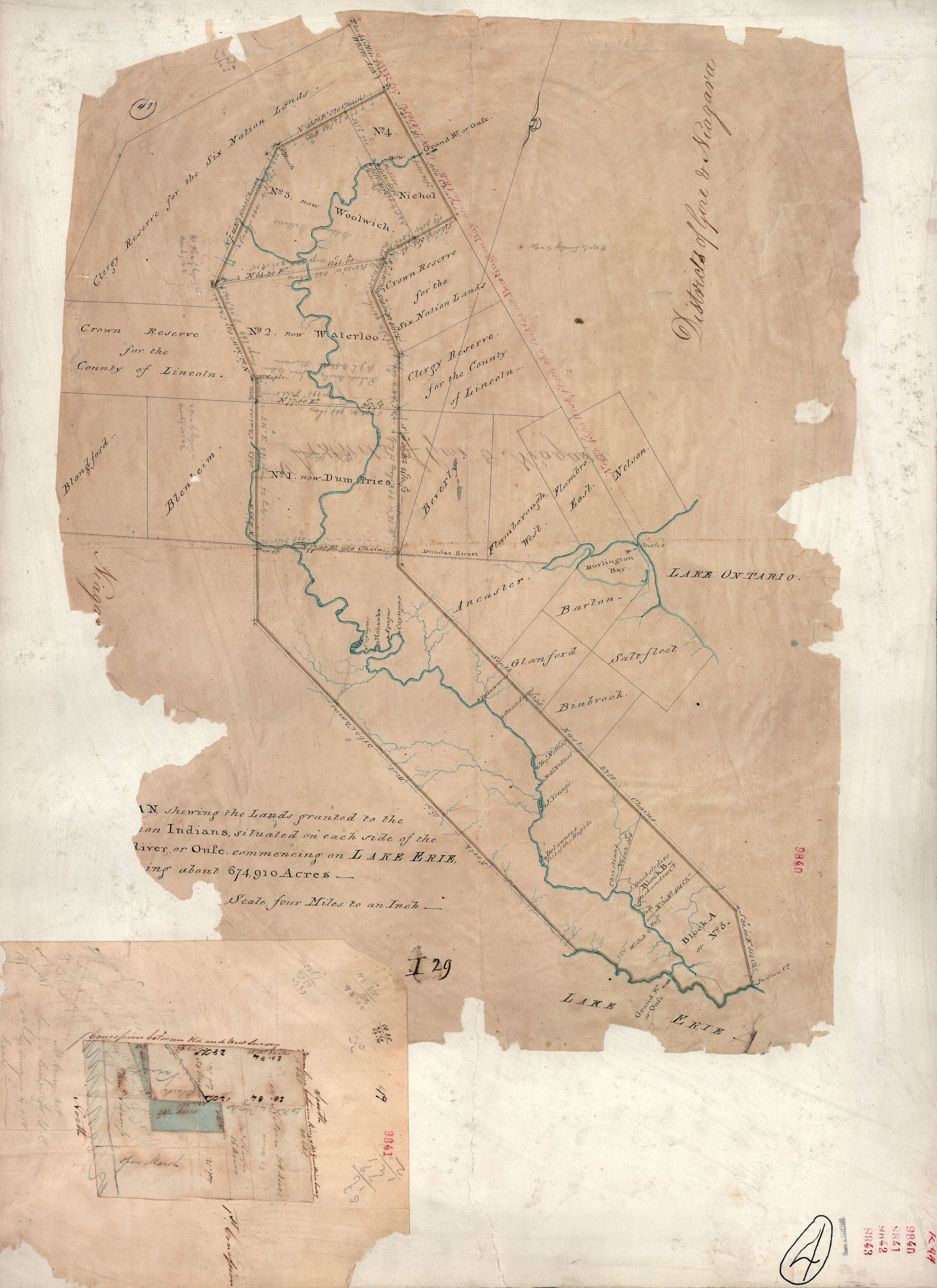
Thomas Ridout survey of 1821, designating the present area of Puslinch as a "Clergy Reserve for the County of Lincoln".

Before colonization, the area was a "neutral" zone and was inhabited by the Neutral Nation (also known as the Attawandaron), in a village of 4,000 in what is now the Badenoch area of Puslinch, near Morriston. Other First Nations settlements were at Puslinch Lake, Arkell Springs and Morriston Pond.

The township was named after Puslinch House in Devon, England, where Elizabeth Yonge, the wife of Lieutenant Governor of Upper Canada Sir John Colborne, was born. The name was given by Lady Seaton after her birthplace in Devon, England. Sir John would later be the Lieutenant-Governor of Upper Canada from 1828 to 1836. An historical plaque indicates that the township was surveyed in 1828–1832 by David Gibson and was originally known as the Church Lands. Many people arrived in the 1830s via Stone Road from Dundas to Galt toward Killean in Puslinch. A settler, Edward Ellis who arrived in 1839, donated land for the construction of the Wesleyan Methodist Church, also known as Ellis Chapel, in 1861. Records from 1846 indicate a population in the township of 1500, most of whom were "Highland Scotch".

The township was an important source of granite used in the construction of homes as well as of limestone and sandstone provided by quarries.

The Arkell area was named after John Arkell (from an originally Dutch family) who emigrated from Kempsford, South Gloucestershire, arriving to the township in May 1831. He established the small community, but returned to England three years later. His first cousin Thomas Arkell remained, built a home, bred sheep and cattle, and was a Magistrate for three decades. Henry Arkell, a breeder of sheep was heavily involved with the Puslinch Agricultural Society and was a Director of the Guelph Central Exhibition and the Fat Stock Show.

The settlement of Aberfoyle was named by John McFarlane from Aberfoyle, Perthshire, Scotland who arrived in 1841 and ran the first general store. A small mill had been built earlier, in 1831, by George Schatz who built a sawmill and also laid out lots of land at a time when the area was called Schatzville, inhabited mostly by German families. Schatz also operated a foundry and brickyard over the years in the Aberfoyle area. The post office did not open until 1854 with Samuel Falconbridge the first postmaster. The first church, Mount Carmel, was built in 1877.

Many of the Germans lived around Morriston, also part of Puslinch. By 1857, Morriston had established the “Victoria Fire Company of the United Village of Morriston and Elgin” with a single fire wagon. In that year, Morriston had a "daily male population of about 400".

== Demographics ==
Puslinch, Ontario Historical populations
Year	Pop.	±%
1991	4,943	—
1996	5,416	+9.6%
2001	5,885	+8.7%
2006	6,689	+13.7%
2011	7,029	+5.1%
2016	7,336	+4.4%
2021	7,944	+8.3%

In the 2021 Census of Population conducted by Statistics Canada, Puslinch had a population of 7,944 living in 2,857 of its 2,946 total private dwellings, a change of 8.3% from its 2016 population of 7,336. With a land area of 214.82 km^{2} (82.94 sq mi), it had a population density of 37.0/km^{2} (95.8/sq mi) in 2021.

== Transportation ==
The main thoroughfares in the area include:

- Highway 401
- Highway 6

=== GO Bus Service ===
Aberfoyle Park & Ride is located within the township at the intersection of Brock Road and McLean Road, and serves the following GO Bus routes:

- GO Bus 17: to Waterloo (Wilfrid Laurier University and University of Waterloo) and Hamilton (Aldershot GO, McMaster University, and Hamilton GO Centre)
- GO Bus 25: to Mississauga (Square One GO Bus Terminal), Milton, Cambridge, and Kitchener (Downtown, Wilfrid Laurier University, and University of Waterloo)
- GO Bus 29: to Mississauga (Square One GO Bus Terminal)
- GO Bus 48: to York University and University of Guelph

== Attractions ==
- Starkey Hill Hiking Trail
- Puslinch Lake
- Ellis Chapel

== Notable residents ==
=== Athletes ===
- John Cullen (1964 – ), professional ice hockey player who played for the Pittsburgh Penguins, Hartford Whalers, Toronto Maple Leafs and Tampa Bay Lightning in the National Hockey League
- Ryan Ellis (1991 – ), professional ice hockey player who played for the Nashville Predators and Philadelphia Flyers of the National Hockey League
- Nick FitzGibbon (1987 – ), professional Canadian football player who played for the Winnipeg Blue Bombers of the Canadian Football League
- Lotte Haidegger (1925 – 2004), competed for Austria in women's discus throw at the 1948 Summer Olympics and 1952 Summer Olympics
- Ray Scapinello (1946 — ), ice hockey referee who worked in the National Hockey League and was inducted into the Hockey Hall of Fame
- Robert Schultz (1989 – ), pairs figure skater who has participated in the Canadian Figure Skating Championships
- Taylor Steele (1992 – ), pairs figure skater who has participated in the Canadian Figure Skating Championships
- Linda Ann Ward (1947 – ), figure skater who competed at the 1964 Winter Olympics

=== Journalists ===
- Colleen McEdwards (1964 – ), reporter for CBC News and anchor for CNN International

=== Judges ===
- John Idington (1840 – 1928), Puisne Justice of the Supreme Court of Canada from 1905 – 1927

=== Musicians ===
- Justin Bieber (1994 – ), singer-songwriter who is a pop icon and is recognized for his multi-genre musical performances
- Tommy Hunter (1937 – ), country music performer, known as "Canada's Country Gentleman"

=== Politicians ===
- Joseph Downey (1865 – 1926), member of the Legislative Assembly of Ontario from 1902 – 1911
- David Jamieson (1856 – 1942), member of the Legislative Assembly of Ontario from 1923 – 1926
- James Harold King (1871 – 1949), member of the Legislative Assembly of Ontario from 1935 – 1943
- James McKenzie (1854 – 1936), member of the Legislative Assembly of Manitoba from 1896 – 1903
- Kenneth McKenzie (1822 – 1911), member of the Legislative Assembly of Manitoba from 1874 – 1892
- Peter H. McKenzie (1845 – 1929), member of the House of Commons of Canada from 1904 – 1908
- William Alexander McKenzie (1874 – 1966), member of the Legislative Assembly of British Columbia from 1918 – 1933
- Daniel McNaughton (1851 – 1925), member of the Legislative Assembly of Ontario from 1893 – 1898
- David Stirton (1816 – 1908), member of the House of Commons of Canada from 1867 – 1876

=== Playwrights ===
- Alex Bulmer (1985 – ), co-founder of the theatre companies SNIFF Inc. and Invisible Flash

=== Publishers ===
- John Bayne Maclean (1862 – 1950), founder of Maclean's Magazine, the Financial Post and the Maclean Publishing Company

=== Religious figures ===
- Michael Baldasaro (1949 – 2016), Archbishop of the Church of the Universe and advocate for marijuana legalization
- David Savage (1830 – 1893), Methodist minister and evangelist who was a pastor in Puslinch from 1864 – 1866

== Controversy ==
In December 2017, the township considered renaming Swastika Trail, a private road on the western edge of the township. The road was initially named in the 1920s, before the rise of Nazi Germany in 1933 (although Adolf Hitler's party adopted the swastika as the Nazi party symbol in 1920). Residents on the street were divided by the name change, while the Jewish group B'nai Brith Canada supported it. The township ultimately decided not to rename the road, citing the previous decision of the cottager's association to leave the name in place. Support for renaming the road eventually grew again, and in September 2022, the township council voted to approve the name change to Holly Trail.

== See also ==
- Adventure travel
- Bruce Trail
- Cambridge, Ontario
- List of townships in Ontario
- Spencer Creek (Ontario)
- Valens, Ontario
