= John Gillies (Canadian politician) =

Canadian politician

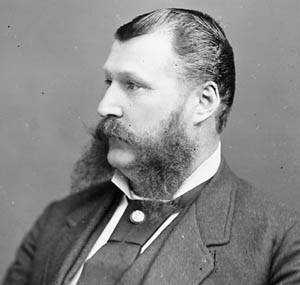

Ontario MPP
- In office 1883–1886
- Preceded by: Donald Sinclair
- Succeeded by: John Walter Scott Biggar
- Constituency: Bruce North

Member of Parliament for Bruce North
- In office 1872–1882
- Preceded by: Alexander Sproat
- Succeeded by: Alexander McNeill

Personal details
- Born: 1837
- Died: 10 December 1889 (aged 52)
- Party: Liberal
- Occupation: Farmer

John Gillies (c. 1837 – 10 December 1889) was an Ontario farmer and political figure. He represented Bruce North in the House of Commons of Canada from 1872 to 1882 and in the Legislative Assembly of Ontario from 1883 to 1886 as a Liberal.

He was born in Kilcalmonell, Argyll, Scotland, the son of Hugh Gillies and Mary Blue, and came to Canada West in 1852, settling near Paisley. Gillies was reeve for Elderslie Township from 1857 to 1873 and warden for Bruce County in 1863 and from 1869 to 1872. He also served as a major in the local militia.

== Parliamentary Career ==
In the 1872 dominion election, Gilles contested North Bruce and defeated incumbent Conservative MP Alexander Sproat by a margin of 23. (Sproat won the seat in the first post confederation election 10 votes.) Gillies was returned in 1874 by acclamation, and defeated Sproat again in 1878 by a more comfortable margin of 156 votes (out of over 3000). He was however defeated in 1882, a loss Gilles attributed to the gerrymandering in the 1882 redistribution (which came to light over a decade later in 1899)

1872 Canadian federal election: Bruce North
| Party | Candidate | Votes |
|---|---|---|
| Liberal | John Gillies | 974 |
| Conservative | Alexander Sproat | 951 |
Source: Canadian Elections Database

1874 Canadian federal election: Bruce North
| Party | Candidate | Votes |
|---|---|---|
| Liberal | John Gillies | acclaimed |

1878 Canadian federal election: Bruce North
| Party | Candidate | Votes |
|---|---|---|
| Liberal | John Gillies | 1,705 |
| Conservative | Alexander Sproat | 1,549 |
Source: Canadian Elections Database

1882 Canadian federal election: Bruce North
| Party | Candidate | Votes |
|---|---|---|
| Liberal–Conservative | Alexander McNeill | 1,250 |
| Liberal | John Gillies | 1,162 |

In the Ontario provincial election the following year, Gillies contested the provincial district of Bruce North, which kept the original boundary at confederation until 1886. At the nomination meeting of the North Bruce Reform Association (as the local chapters of the Liberal Party was still called then) held in Port Elgin on February 14, 1883, Gillies' name was one of the three put forward for nomination. When the contenders were asked for commitments to abide by the decision of the convention, Gillies declined and withdrew from contention, and the Liberal nomination went to James Rowand, Gillies' riding association president when he was MP. Gilles stood as an independent candidate. Sensing a potential schism in Liberal ranks, the Conservatives field no candidate in that election, and Gillies went on to defeat Roward on tally of 1186 vs 1066, and the result was trumpeted by Conservative press Toronto Mail as "North Bruce Redeemed". Following his election, Gilles made a pointed to declared reiterate his loyalty to the Liberal Party and his support for the Mowat ministry through a letter printed in the Liberal Globe. Rowand would later held West Bruce, the federal seat gerrymandered with surplus of Liberal votes, from 1887 to 1896.

1883 Ontario general election: Bruce North
| Party | Candidate | Votes |
|---|---|---|
| Independent Liberal | John Gillies | 1186 |
| Liberal | James Rowand | 1066 |
| Total valid votes | | 2252 |
| Eligible voters | | 5091 |
Source: Elections Ontario

== Later Life and Legacy ==
In 1888, he was named a police magistrate in Sault Ste. Marie. He died there at the age of 52.

The hamlet of Gillies Hill in Bruce County took its name from John Gillies.
