= Donald Sinclair (Ontario politician) =

Canadian politician (1829–1900)

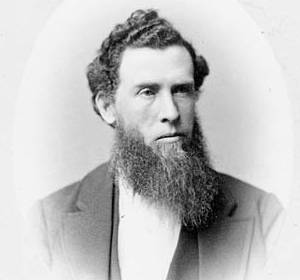

Ontario MPP
- In office 1867–1883
- Preceded by: Riding established
- Succeeded by: John Gillies
- Constituency: Bruce North

Personal details
- Born: July 15, 1829 Islay, Scotland
- Died: November 19, 1900 (aged 71) Toronto, Ontario
- Party: Liberal
- Spouse: Isabella Adair (m. 1871)
- Occupation: Businessman

Donald Sinclair (July 1829 – November 19, 1900) was an Ontario businessman and political figure. He represented Bruce North in the Legislative Assembly of Ontario as a Liberal member from 1867 to 1883.

He was born on the Isle of Islay, Scotland and came to Peel County in Canada West in 1851, later settling in Bruce County. Sinclair taught school for several years in Bruce County and near Toronto. He was elected deputy reeve for Arran township in 1863. He moved to Paisley in 1869 and opened a general store there.

In 1871, Sinclair married Isabella Adair.

In 1883, he was named registrar of deeds for Bruce County.

He died in Toronto, where he had gone to seek medical advice.

== Electoral history ==
1867 Ontario general election: Bruce North
Party	Candidate	Votes
Liberal	Donald Sinclair	Acclaimed
Source: Elections Ontario

1871 Ontario general election: Bruce North
Party	Candidate	Votes
Liberal	Donald Sinclair	Acclaimed
Source: Elections Ontario

1875 Ontario general election: Bruce North
Party	Candidate	Votes	%
Liberal	Donald Sinclair	1,232	55.95
Independent	A.L. Sinclair	970	44.05
Turnout		2,202	68.75
Eligible voters		3,203	
Liberal hold			
Source: Elections Ontario

1879 Ontario general election: Bruce North
Party	Candidate	Votes	%	±%
Liberal	Donald Sinclair	1,686	56.77	+0.82
Conservative	John Walter Scott Biggar	1,284	43.23	
Total valid votes		2,970	63.41	−5.34
Eligible voters		4,684		
Liberal hold		Swing		+0.82
Source: Elections Ontario
