= Daniel McNaughton =

Canadian politician

Ontario MPP
- In office 1893–1898
- Preceded by: David Porter
- Succeeded by: Charles Martin Bowman
- Constituency: Bruce North

Personal details
- Born: October 11, 1851 Puslinch Township, Wellington County, Canada West
- Died: July 12, 1925 (aged 73) Kincardine, Ontario
- Party: Liberal-Protestant Protective Association
- Spouse: Mary McGregor (m. 1884)
- Occupation: Farmer

Daniel McNaughton (October 11, 1851 – July 12, 1925) was an Ontario farmer and political figure. He represented Bruce North in the Legislative Assembly of Ontario from 1893 to 1898. He was elected in a 1893 by-election when he ran as a Patrons of Industry candidate. In 1894 he was elected as a Liberal and then as a Liberal-Protestant Protective Association member.

He was born in Puslinch Township, Wellington County, Canada West and moved to Bruce Township in 1881. He served on the township council and was reeve from 1891 to 1893. McNaughton was elected to the provincial assembly in an 1893 by-election after the death of David Porter. In 1913, he became the first president of the Bruce Municipal Telephone System and served until his resignation in 1922. McNaughton was also president of the Underwood Agricultural Society and a member of the local Freemasons.
