= Frederick Wellington Elliott =

Canadian politician

Ontario MPP
- In office 1929–1934
- Preceded by: Alexander Patterson Mewhinney
- Succeeded by: Riding abolished
- Constituency: Bruce North

Personal details
- Born: August 15, 1873 Southampton, Ontario
- Died: November 26, 1933 (aged 60) Toronto, Ontario
- Party: Liberal
- Spouse: Emma Crowe (m. 1900)

Frederick Wellington Elliott (August 15, 1873 – November 26, 1933) was a farmer and political figure in Ontario. He represented Bruce North in the Legislative Assembly of Ontario from 1929 to 1933 as a Liberal member.

He was born in Southampton, Ontario, the son of Sidney M. Elliott and Margaret Spence. In 1900, he married Emma Crowe. Elliott served as clerk for Saugeen township from 1905 to 1930 and as county clerk from 1915 to 1930. He died in office at the age of 60.
