= Alexander Patterson Mewhinney =

Canadian politician

Ontario MPP
- In office 1926–1929
- Preceded by: William Henry Fenton
- Succeeded by: Frederick Wellington Elliott
- Constituency: Bruce North
- In office 1919–1926
- Preceded by: Charles Martin Bowman
- Succeeded by: Riding abolished
- Constituency: Bruce West

Personal details
- Born: April 26, 1873 Bruce Township, Ontario
- Died: October 29, 1929 (aged 56) Owen Sound, Ontario
- Party: Liberal
- Spouse: Maud Cole (m. 1906)
- Occupation: Farmer

Alexander Patterson Mewhinney (April 26, 1873 – October 29, 1929) was an Ontario farmer and political figure. He represented Bruce West and then Bruce North in the Legislative Assembly of Ontario from 1919 to 1929 as a Liberal member.

He was born in Bruce Township, Ontario, the son of Joseph Mewhinney, and took over the operation of the family farm. In 1906, he married Maud Cole. He served on the township council and was reeve from 1913 to 1914 and warden for Bruce County in 1914. Mewhinney served as whip for the Liberals in the provincial assembly. He was a district deputy in the Masonic lodge. Mewhinney suffered a fatal stroke while campaigning for reelection in 1929.
