= David Porter (Ontario politician) =

Canadian politician (1849–1893)

Ontario MPP
- In office 1891–1893
- Preceded by: John George
- Succeeded by: Daniel McNaughton
- Constituency: Bruce North

Personal details
- Born: 1849 Halton County, Canada West
- Died: August 7, 1893 (aged 44) Amabel, Ontario
- Party: Liberal
- Spouse: Eliza Chambers (m. 1884)
- Occupation: Businessman

David Porter (1849 - August 7, 1893) was an Ontario businessman and political figure. He represented Bruce North in the Legislative Assembly of Ontario from 1891 to 1893 as a Liberal member.

Porter was born in Halton County in 1847, the son of Irish immigrants. He built and operated a sawmill in Amabel Township. In 1884, he married Eliza Chambers. Porter served as reeve for Amabel from 1880 to 1883 and in 1885. He was defeated in the general election held in 1890 but elected in an 1891 by-election held after the election of John George was overturned on appeal. He died in office in 1893.
