= Trevor King (politician) =

Canadian politician

Trevor King MLA

Member of the Legislative Assembly of Manitoba for Lakeside
- Incumbent
- Assumed office October 3, 2023
- Preceded by: Ralph Eichler

Reeve of the Rural Municipality of Woodlands
- In office 2014–2018
- Preceded by: Don Walsh
- Succeeded by: Lori Schellekens

RM of Woodlands Municipal Councillor
- In office 2006–2014

Personal details
- Born: Woodlands, Manitoba, Canada
- Party: Progressive Conservative

Trevor King is a Canadian politician, who was elected to the Legislative Assembly of Manitoba in the 2023 Manitoba general election. He represents the district of Lakeside as a member of the Manitoba Progressive Conservative Party.

King operates a farm near Warren, Manitoba. He was elected to the council of Rural Municipality of Woodlands in 2006, and served as its reeve from 2014 to 2018.

On October 24, 2023, he was appointed as the Shadow Minister for Municipal and Northern Relations and as the Shadow Minister for Indigenous Economic Development.

== Electoral record ==
2023 Manitoba general election: Lakeside
Party	Candidate	Votes	%	±%	Expenditures
Progressive Conservative	Trevor King	6,088	61.68	-6.56	$13,908.42
New Democratic	Dan Rugg	2,682	27.17	+4.93	$1,196.66
Liberal	Neil Stewart	1,101	11.15	+1.64	$11,204.70
Total valid votes/expense limit		9,871	99.30	–	$63,535.00
Total rejected and declined ballots		70	0.70	–	
Turnout		9,941	60.98	+1.76	
Eligible voters		16,032			
Progressive Conservative hold		Swing		-5.75	
Source(s) Source: Elections Manitoba
