= Starkey Hill =

Highest point in Puslinch Township, Ontario, Canada

Coordinates: 43.5368°N 80.1552°W

Starkey Hill is the highest point in Puslinch Township, southwestern Ontario and is located southeast of Guelph, Ontario. The property is currently owned by the Grand River Conservation Authority and sports a 4 km (2½ mi) loop hiking trail. Parking and access to the trail is located off Arkell Rd., 1 km east of Watson Rd. and the village of Arkell.

== Background ==
Starkey Hill is named after the Starkey family who moved to the area in 1833 from the United States and purchased 100 acres (40 ha) of land outside of Arkell in 1849.

The following information on the later years of the area was taken from the "Starkey Hill Interpretive Trail" brochure:

In 1911, the Geodetic Survey of Canada created a triangulation station on the Starkey property. The tower was built of wood and stood 100 ft (30 m) with a 36×36 ft (11×11 m) base. The tower was located on the highest point of the property which is also the highest point in Puslinch township.

The purpose of the tower was for triangulation surveying. There were hundreds of towers constructed for this purpose in North America. Most of the work was done at night and lamps were placed in towers and sighted from ground locations.

The information gathered from this project formed the basis for topographic mapping used today.

These towers were not built as permanent structures, and therefore it came down before 1920. The wood from the tower was later used by the Starkey family to build an implement shed. The shed does not stand today.

For more information on the area, contact the Grand River Conservation Authority.
