= Puslinch Lake =

Kettle lake in Wellington County, Ontario, Canada

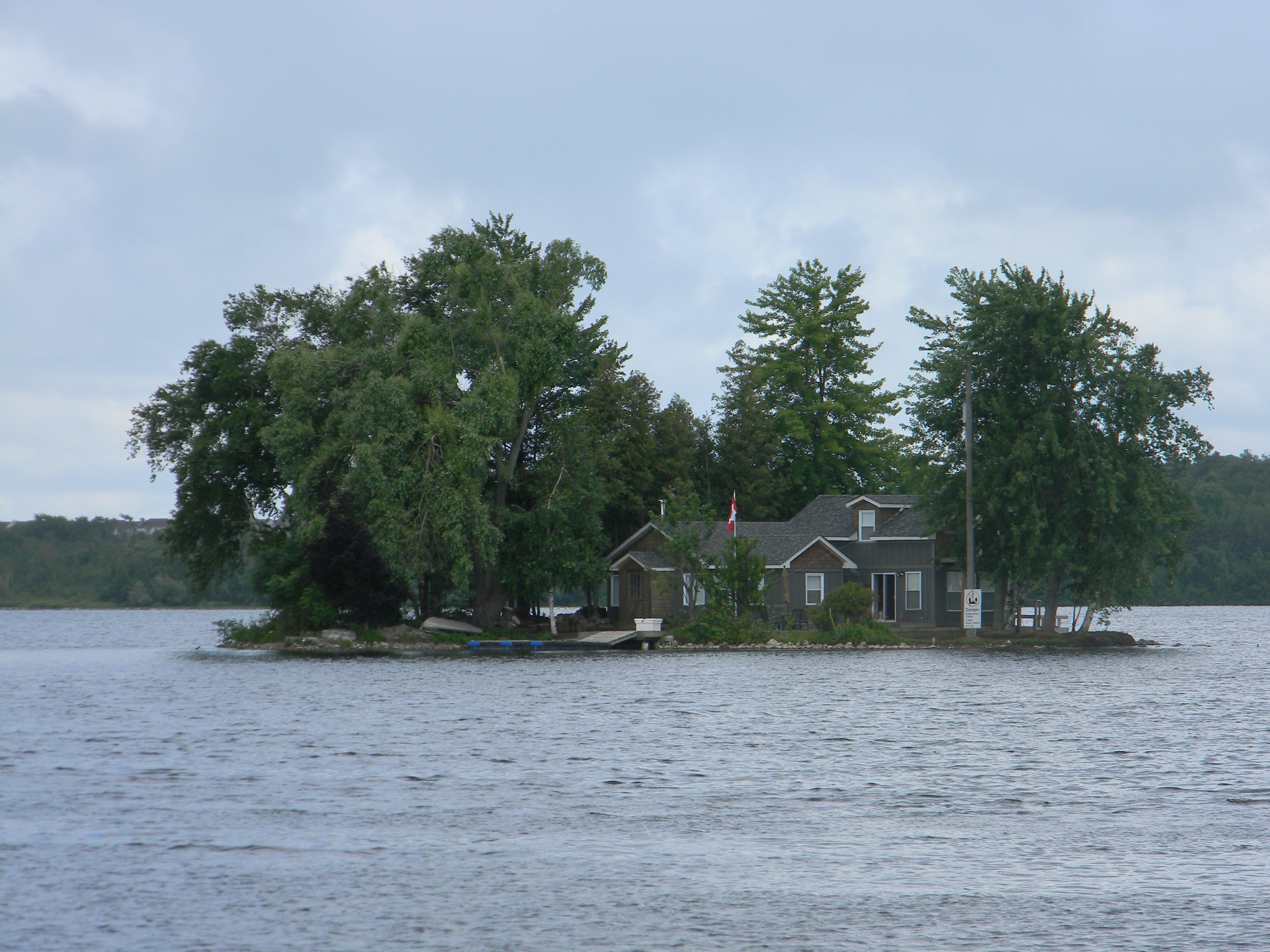
- Island on Puslinch Lake

- Location within Ontario
- Location: Ontario
- Coordinates: 43°25′2.6″N 80°15′56.3″W
- Type: Kettle
- Catchment area: 9.725 km^{2} (3.755 sq mi)
- Basin countries: Canada
- Max. length: 2.012 km (1.250 mi)
- Max. width: 0.805 km (0.500 mi)
- Surface area: 1.56 km^{2} (0.60 sq mi)
- Average depth: 1.4 m (4 ft 7 in)
- Max. depth: 5.5 m (18 ft)
- Water volume: 2,270,000 m^{3} (1,840 acre⋅ft)
- Surface elevation: 303 m (994 ft)
- Settlements: Puslinch, Ontario

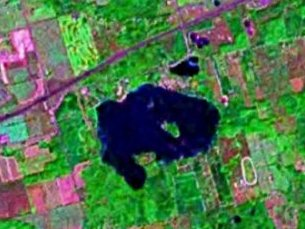
Satellite view

Puslinch Lake is a kettle lake located in Wellington County, Ontario, Canada. It is the largest kettle lake in North America. The lake is "private", according to Puslinch Township Council with public access through the beach and boat launch closed as of July 2020, after the owners determined visitor usage overwhelmed the small area, due to an influx of visitors following COVID-19 restrictions and public interest due to a summer home on the lake owned by Justin Bieber. In October 2020, Township of Puslinch announced that it is "working towards creating a public access to Puslinch Lake".

The Puslinch Lake - Irish Creek Wetland, a provincially significant area, is adjacent to the lake.

== Hydrography ==
The lake is normally fed by surface runoff and underwater springs; there are no permanent inflow streams. Several ephemeral streams discharge into Mud Bay, however. During high water conditions, the lake outflows into Puslinch Lake Creek, which is a part of the Grand River drainage basin. There is a channel connecting Puslinch Lake to Little Lake, located to the northeast. However, it is devoid of moving water, except for high water conditions.

== Ecology ==
The lake is relatively shallow, most of it being less than 2 m in depth; the maximum depth is approximately 5.5 m. The deepest area corresponds to only 0.4% of the entire lake. Because of that, and due to very limited inflow and outflow, the lake actively undergoes the processes of eutrophication, with associated algal bloom, low oxygen level, and periodic fish kills. While these processes are natural, their rate is increased by anthropogenic factors, since a large portion of the lake's shoreline was modified from its original state to allow residential development. Increasing thickness of organic sediments resulted in the necessity to dredge the lake. Settling ponds were constructed nearby; however, they were quickly deemed inadequate. A new approach was then implemented, involving moving the dredged material into porous bags, which allowed water to be released back into the lake. The remaining dried material is intended for sale as topsoil enrichment.

== Fish population ==
There are 16 species of fish present in the lake; some of them had been introduced. The lake supports a population of banded killifish, one of only a few known populations in the whole Grand River basin.

== History ==
Permanent settlers first arrived to this area in the 1830s after it had been surveyed into lots for farms. Records indicate that the first settlers in the area were Peter and Alex Lamont in 1831; others subsequently arrived to replace the earlier squatters. In 1846, Rev. Father Simon Sanderl of Guelph had a small church build on the Big Island in Puslinch Lake as a mission; he left Wellington county in 1850 and later in that decade, two men converted the church into a hotel, which did not succeed.

The lake was a popular destination for picnics in 1867 and day trippers came often. By the 1870s, boat races were being held here on holidays and these "became a major attraction", according to one report. Guelph brewer George Sleeman purchased property here in the 19th century; he would eventually own 55 acres, some of it on nearby Little Lake. By the late 1880s, Puslinch Lake "became a summer playground for residents of Wellington and Waterloo counties".

Sleeman built the Puslinch Lake Hotel in 1880 and purchased a steamboat for the lake that operated until 1883. (Hotels at the lake had been built previously by two other individuals, Alex Parks and Thomas Frame.)

After Sleeman encountered financial difficulties, the City of Guelph, Ontario took over his properties at the lake in 1903. The city sold the acreage "for the development of private cottages" in the late 1920s according to a 2021 report. Another report, published in 2000, stated that the City placed the land on the market in 1916 after a plan had been completed to divide the eastern part of the City's property into 42 cottage lots and a resort.

A resort area known as Barber's Beach, called Swastika Beach until 1938, was developed in the 1920s by T. Ross Barber who imported sand to make the beach; he added a "change house, a bowling alley, and a big concession building that had a dance floor". This spot remained popular for decades and eventually housed 100 trailer sites and some cottages. The property was sold in 2000 and was developed into an area of luxury homes known as Irish Creek Estates. Barber had named the road near the beach Swastika Road long before the Nazi Party had gained power; some residents in the 21st century wanted it renamed but in December 2017, Puslinch Council voted to retain the original name.

Businessman J.W. Lyon owned property here at about the same time as Sleeman. He subdivided much of that land into 42 lots in 1916; most had been sold by 1932. The Eagle family owned the land at the east end of Puslinch Lake for decades; much of this was made into a subdivision of 26 lots in 1920, known as Eagle Park. According to the report published in 2000, "these subdivisions marked the beginning of the modern era of Puslinch Lake, which combined private cottages with publicly accessible facilities".

The property owners on the lake formed a charitable organization in 1997, Puslinch Lake Conservation Association, with a goal of "environmental restoration".

As of February 2021, the Township of Puslinch Web site indicated that "Puslinch Lake is a public lake with no formal maintained public access at this time".

== Notable residents ==
- In July 2018, Justin Bieber, & Hailey Bieber purchased a 9,000 Square foot and 101 acres mansion for $5 million in Puslinch Lake. The Biebers spent their time at Puslinch Lake in 2020, during the COVID-19 pandemic.
