= Lakeside (electoral district) =

Provincial electoral district in Manitoba, Canada

Coordinates: 50.373°N 97.426°W

Manitoba electoral district

Provincial electoral district
- Legislature: Legislative Assembly of Manitoba
MLA
Trevor King
Progressive Conservative
- District created: 1886
- First contested: 1888
- Last contested: 2023

Demographics
- Population (2016): 23,405
- Electors (2019): 16,039
- Area (km²): 3,661
- Pop. density (per km²): 6.4

Lakeside is a provincial electoral district of Manitoba, Canada. It is located to the immediate northwest of the city of Winnipeg.

Traditionally a rural riding, Lakeside has become more urban in recent years (as a result of both electoral redistribution and changes in demography). All the same, agriculture accounted for 17 per cent of the riding's industry in 1999. The riding is bordered to the north by Interlake, to the west by Portage la Prairie, to the south by Morris and to the east by Gimli. It also borders the city of Winnipeg to the southeast.

There are no major urban centres in the riding. Communities include Argyle, Balmoral, Rosser, Gunton, Stonewall, Stony Mountain, Teulon, Warren, Woodlands, and Inwood.

Lakeside's population in 1996 was 19,473. The average family income in 1999 was Can$49,774, with an unemployment rate of 6.10 per cent. Eight per cent of the population is of a German background, and 8 per cent are aboriginal.

Lakeside was created by provincial redistribution in 1886. It has traditionally elected representatives of agrarian interests, both of the Liberal and Progressive Conservative parties. It is presently a comfortably safe seat for the Tories, who have held it without interruption since 1969. Since 1922, only four men have held the seat.

Lakeside's best-known Member of the Legislative Assembly (MLA), Douglas Campbell, represented the constituency for 47 years, first as a Progressive, then as a Liberal-Progressive, then as a Liberal—longer than anyone in provincial history. He served as premier from 1949 to 1958.

== List of provincial representatives ==
Name	Party	Took office	Left office
Kenneth McKenzie	Lib	1886	1892
John Rutherford	Lib	1892	1896
James MacKenzie	Lib	1896	1903
Edwin Lynch	Cons	1903	1910
Charles Duncan McPherson	Lib	1910	1914
John J. Garland	Cons	1914	1915
Charles Duncan McPherson	Lib	1915	1922
Douglas L. Campbell	Prog	1922	1932
	Lib-Prog	1932	1961
	Lib	1961	1969
Harry Enns	PC	1969	2003
Ralph Eichler	PC	2003	2023
Trevor King	PC	2023	

== Election results ==
=== 2023 ===
2023 Manitoba general election
Party	Candidate	Votes	%	±%	Expenditures
Progressive Conservative	Trevor King	6,088	61.68	-6.56	$13,908.42
New Democratic	Dan Rugg	2,682	27.17	+4.93	$1,196.66
Liberal	Neil Stewart	1,101	11.15	+1.64	$11,204.70
Total valid votes/expense limit		9,871	99.30	–	$63,535.00
Total rejected and declined ballots		70	0.70	–	
Turnout		9,941	60.98	+1.76	
Eligible voters		16,032			
Progressive Conservative hold		Swing		-5.75	
Source(s) Source: Elections Manitoba

=== 2019 ===
2019 Manitoba general election
Party	Candidate	Votes	%	±%	Expenditures
Progressive Conservative	Ralph Eichler	6,409	68.24	-11.8	$18,395.34
New Democratic	Dan Rugg	2,089	22.24	+5.8	$2,433.39
Liberal	Ilsa Regelsky	894	9.52	+5.9	$0.00
Total valid votes		9,392	98.88	–	
Rejected		106	1.12		
Turnout		9,498	59.22		
Eligible voters		16,039			
Progressive Conservative hold		Swing		-8.8	
Source(s) Source: Manitoba. Chief Electoral Officer (2019). Statement of Votes for the 42nd Provincial General Election, September 10, 2019 (PDF) (Report). Winnipeg: Elections Manitoba. "Candidate Election Returns". Elections Manitoba. Elections Manitoba.

=== 2016 ===
2016 provincial election redistributed results
Party	%
Progressive Conservative	80.0
New Democratic	16.4
Liberal	3.6

2016 Manitoba general election
Party	Candidate	Votes	%	±%
Progressive Conservative	Ralph Eichler	6,077	81.61	15.81
New Democratic	Matt Austman	1,369	18.39	-7.51
Total valid votes		7,446	–	–
Rejected		272	–	
Eligible voters / turnout		13,357	57.78	0.66
Source(s) Source: Manitoba. Chief Electoral Officer (2016). Statement of Votes for the 41st Provincial General Election, April 19, 2016 (PDF) (Report). Winnipeg: Elections Manitoba. "Election Returns: 41st General Election". Elections Manitoba. 2016.

=== 2011 ===
2011 Manitoba general election
Party	Candidate	Votes	%	±%	Expenditures
Progressive Conservative	Ralph Eichler	5,043	65.80	9.61	$16,402.48
New Democratic	Rosemary Hnatiuk	1,985	25.90	-7.34	$6,166.66
Green	Betty Kehler	379	4.95	0.54	$423.06
Liberal	Jerald Funk	257	3.35	-2.81	$1,578.68
Total valid votes		7,664	–	–	
Rejected		19	–		
Eligible voters / turnout		13,451	57.12	-0.52	
Source(s) Source: Manitoba. Chief Electoral Officer (2011). Statement of Votes for the 40th Provincial General Election, October 4, 2011 (PDF) (Report). Winnipeg: Elections Manitoba. "Election Returns: 40th General Election". Elections Manitoba. 2011.

=== 2007 ===
2007 Manitoba general election
Party	Candidate	Votes	%	±%	Expenditures
Progressive Conservative	Ralph Eichler	4,448	56.19	3.23	$25,444.44
New Democratic	Mitch Obach	2,631	33.24	-5.61	$5,039.43
Liberal	Ian Band	488	6.16	-2.03	$340.29
Green	David Carey	349	4.41	–	$39.55
Total valid votes		7,916	–	–	
Rejected		37	–		
Eligible voters / turnout		13,798	57.64	1.25	
Source(s) Source: Manitoba. Chief Electoral Officer (2007). Statement of Votes for the 39th Provincial General Election, May 22, 2007 (PDF) (Report). Winnipeg: Elections Manitoba.

=== 2003 ===
2003 Manitoba general election
Party	Candidate	Votes	%	±%
Progressive Conservative	Ralph Eichler	4,110	52.96	4.21
New Democratic	Robert B. Marshall	3,015	38.85	8.17
Liberal	Louis Allain	636	8.19	-9.93
Total valid votes		7,761	–	–
Rejected		36	–	
Eligible voters / Turnout		13,828	56.39	-11.60
Source(s) Source: Manitoba. Chief Electoral Officer (2003). Statement of Votes for the 38th Provincial General Election, June 3, 2003 (PDF) (Report). Winnipeg: Elections Manitoba.

=== 1999 ===
1999 Manitoba general election
Party	Candidate	Votes	%	±%	Expenditures
Progressive Conservative	Harry Enns	4,426	48.75	-8.37	$29,096.49
New Democratic	Paul Pododworny	2,785	30.68	7.15	$8,817.00
Liberal	Dave Harcus	1,646	18.13	0.21	$16,777.36
Manitoba	Marcel Van De Kerckhove	222	2.45	–	$200.00
Total valid votes		9,079	–	–	
Rejected		45	–		
Eligible voters / turnout		13,421	67.98	3.24	
Source(s) Source: Manitoba. Chief Electoral Officer (1999). Statement of Votes for the 37th Provincial General Election, September 21, 1999 (PDF) (Report). Winnipeg: Elections Manitoba.

=== 1995 ===
1995 Manitoba general election
Party	Candidate	Votes	%	±%
Progressive Conservative	Harry Enns	4,376	57.12	7.43
New Democratic	Eduard Hiebert	1,802	23.52	6.85
Liberal	Dorothy Hudson	1,373	17.92	-7.95
Libertarian	Gary Bergen	110	1.44	0.17
Total valid votes		7,661	–	–
Rejected		29	–	
Eligible voters / Turnout		11,877	64.75	1.44
Source(s) Source: Manitoba. Chief Electoral Officer (1999). Statement of Votes for the 37th Provincial General Election, September 21, 1999 (PDF) (Report). Winnipeg: Elections Manitoba.

=== 1990 ===
1990 Manitoba general election
Party	Candidate	Votes	%	±%
Progressive Conservative	Harry Enns	3,719	49.69	0.73
Liberal	Delmer Nott	1,936	25.87	-5.08
New Democratic	Eduard Hiebert	1,248	16.68	6.04
Confederation of Regions	Irene Armishaw	486	6.49	-2.96
Libertarian	Dennis Rice	95	1.27	–
Total valid votes		7,484	–	–
Rejected		10	–	
Eligible voters / Turnout		11,837	63.31	-7.14
Source(s) Source: Manitoba. Chief Electoral Officer (1999). Statement of Votes for the 37th Provincial General Election, September 21, 1999 (PDF) (Report). Winnipeg: Elections Manitoba.

=== 1988 ===
1988 Manitoba general election
Party	Candidate	Votes	%	±%
Progressive Conservative	Harry Enns	4,475	48.97	-0.41
Liberal	Delmer Nott	2,828	30.94	19.94
New Democratic	Ed Hiebert	972	10.64	-16.91
Confederation of Regions	Cam Baldwin	864	9.45	-2.62
Total valid votes		9,139	–	–
Rejected		18	–	
Eligible voters / Turnout		12,998	70.45	-0.60
Source(s) Source: Manitoba. Chief Electoral Officer (1999). Statement of Votes for the 37th Provincial General Election, September 21, 1999 (PDF) (Report). Winnipeg: Elections Manitoba.

=== 1986 ===
1986 Manitoba general election
Party	Candidate	Votes	%	±%
Progressive Conservative	Harry Enns	4,303	49.38	-10.91
New Democratic	Frieda Krpan	2,400	27.54	-3.83
Confederation of Regions	Hubert L. Good	1,052	12.07	–
Liberal	Roger Chabot	959	11.01	3.94
Total valid votes		8,714	–	–
Rejected		17	–	
Eligible voters / Turnout		12,289	71.05	-2.49
Source(s) Source: Manitoba. Chief Electoral Officer (1999). Statement of Votes for the 37th Provincial General Election, September 21, 1999 (PDF) (Report). Winnipeg: Elections Manitoba.

=== 1981 ===
1981 Manitoba general election
Party	Candidate	Votes	%	±%
Progressive Conservative	Harry Enns	5,055	60.29	-0.90
New Democratic	Larry Verner Moldowan	2,630	31.37	8.44
Liberal	Bill Ridgeway	592	7.06	-8.81
Progressive	Hugh McCaw	107	1.28	–
Total valid votes		8,384	–	–
Rejected		7	–	
Eligible voters / Turnout		11,411	73.53	4.21
Source(s) Source: Manitoba. Chief Electoral Officer (1999). Statement of Votes for the 37th Provincial General Election, September 21, 1999 (PDF) (Report). Winnipeg: Elections Manitoba.

=== 1977 ===
1977 Manitoba general election
Party	Candidate	Votes	%	±%
Progressive Conservative	Harry Enns	3,987	61.20	15.80
New Democratic	Phillip "Phil" Schwarz	1,494	22.93	-4.48
Liberal	Douglas Clifford	1,034	15.87	-11.32
Total valid votes		6,515	–	–
Rejected		11	–	
Eligible voters / Turnout		9,414	69.32	-7.55
Source(s) Source: Manitoba. Chief Electoral Officer (1999). Statement of Votes for the 37th Provincial General Election, September 21, 1999 (PDF) (Report). Winnipeg: Elections Manitoba.

=== 1973 ===
1973 Manitoba general election
Party	Candidate	Votes	%	±%
Progressive Conservative	Harry Enns	2,969	45.40	-2.42
New Democratic	George B. Schreyer	1,793	27.42	16.59
Liberal	Percy Alan Beachell	1,778	27.19	-14.17
Total valid votes		6,540	–	–
Rejected		26	–	
Eligible voters / Turnout		8,541	76.88	8.05
Source(s) Source: Manitoba. Chief Electoral Officer (1999). Statement of Votes for the 37th Provincial General Election, September 21, 1999 (PDF) (Report). Winnipeg: Elections Manitoba.

=== 1969 ===
1969 Manitoba general election
Party	Candidate	Votes	%	±%
Progressive Conservative	Harry Enns	2,532	47.82	6.78
Liberal	Robert Bend	2,190	41.36	-9.79
New Democratic	Charles Lucas	573	10.82	3.01
Total valid votes		5,295	–	–
Rejected		17	–	
Eligible voters / Turnout		7,718	68.83	1.79
Source(s) Source: Manitoba. Chief Electoral Officer (1999). Statement of Votes for the 37th Provincial General Election, September 21, 1999 (PDF) (Report). Winnipeg: Elections Manitoba.

=== 1966 ===
1966 Manitoba general election
Party	Candidate	Votes	%	±%
Liberal	Douglas Lloyd Campbell	1,780	51.15	-3.62
Progressive Conservative	William Frank Sims	1,428	41.03	1.45
New Democratic	Francis Harry Mason	272	7.82	2.17
Total valid votes		3,480	–	–
Rejected		26	–	
Eligible voters / Turnout		5,230	67.04	-1.91
Source(s) Source: Manitoba. Chief Electoral Officer (1999). Statement of Votes for the 37th Provincial General Election, September 21, 1999 (PDF) (Report). Winnipeg: Elections Manitoba.

=== 1962 ===
1962 Manitoba general election
Party	Candidate	Votes	%	±%
Liberal	Douglas Lloyd Campbell	2,009	54.77	–
Progressive Conservative	John F. Bate	1,452	39.59	-5.35
New Democratic	Hazel C. Allan	207	5.64	–
Total valid votes		3,668	–	–
Rejected		42	–	
Eligible voters / Turnout		5,381	68.95	2.24
Source(s) Source: Manitoba. Chief Electoral Officer (1999). Statement of Votes for the 37th Provincial General Election, September 21, 1999 (PDF) (Report). Winnipeg: Elections Manitoba.

=== 1959 ===
1959 Manitoba general election
Party	Candidate	Votes	%	±%
Liberal–Progressive	Douglas Lloyd Campbell	1,896	48.02	-9.23
Progressive Conservative	John Frederick Bate	1,774	44.93	2.19
Co-operative Commonwealth	Allen Werbiski	278	7.04	–
Total valid votes		3,948	–	–
Rejected		13	–	
Eligible voters / Turnout		5,938	66.71	5.57
Source(s) Source: Manitoba. Chief Electoral Officer (1999). Statement of Votes for the 37th Provincial General Election, September 21, 1999 (PDF) (Report). Winnipeg: Elections Manitoba.

=== 1958 ===
1958 Manitoba general election
Party	Candidate	Votes	%	±%
Liberal–Progressive	Douglas Lloyd Campbell	2,119	57.25	1.13
Progressive Conservative	John F. Bate	1,582	42.75	26.52
Total valid votes		3,701	–	–
Rejected		13	–	
Eligible voters / Turnout		6,075	61.14	-11.21
Source(s) Source: Manitoba. Chief Electoral Officer (1999). Statement of Votes for the 37th Provincial General Election, September 21, 1999 (PDF) (Report). Winnipeg: Elections Manitoba.

=== 1953 ===
1953 Manitoba general election
Party	Candidate	Votes	%	±%
Liberal–Progressive	Douglas Lloyd Campbell	2,290	56.13	–
Social Credit	James William Lee Tulley	786	19.26	–
Progressive Conservative	Charles Harold Spence	662	16.23	–
Co-operative Commonwealth	Hazel Christina Allan	342	8.38	–
Total valid votes		4,080	–	–
Rejected		79	–	
Eligible voters / Turnout		5,749	72.34	72.34
Source(s) Source: Manitoba. Chief Electoral Officer (1999). Statement of Votes for the 37th Provincial General Election, September 21, 1999 (PDF) (Report). Winnipeg: Elections Manitoba.

=== 1949 ===
1949 Manitoba general election
Party	Candidate	Votes	%	±%
Liberal–Progressive	Douglas Lloyd Campbell	acclaimed	–	–
Total valid votes			–	–
Rejected		N/A	–	
Eligible voters / Turnout		5,303	0.00	0.00
Source(s) Source: Manitoba. Chief Electoral Officer (1999). Statement of Votes for the 37th Provincial General Election, September 21, 1999 (PDF) (Report). Winnipeg: Elections Manitoba.

=== 1945 ===
1945 Manitoba general election
Party	Candidate	Votes	%	±%
Liberal–Progressive	Douglas Lloyd Campbell	acclaimed	–	–
Total valid votes			–	–
Rejected		N/A	–	
Eligible voters / Turnout		4,071	0.00	0.00
Source(s) Source: Manitoba. Chief Electoral Officer (1999). Statement of Votes for the 37th Provincial General Election, September 21, 1999 (PDF) (Report). Winnipeg: Elections Manitoba.

=== 1941 ===
1941 Manitoba general election
Party	Candidate	Votes	%	±%
Liberal–Progressive	Douglas Lloyd Campbell	acclaimed	–	–
Total valid votes		–	–	–
Rejected		N/A	–	
Eligible voters / Turnout		4,613	0.00	-72.16
Source(s) Source: Manitoba. Chief Electoral Officer (1999). Statement of Votes for the 37th Provincial General Election, September 21, 1999 (PDF) (Report). Winnipeg: Elections Manitoba.

=== 1936 ===
1936 Manitoba general election
Party	Candidate	Votes	%	±%
Liberal–Progressive	Douglas Lloyd Campbell	1,804	55.49	-0.91
Conservative	Charles Montgomery Blair	1,447	44.51	0.91
Total valid votes		3,251	–	–
Rejected		51	–	
Eligible voters / Turnout		4,576	72.16	-16.97
Source(s) Source: Manitoba. Chief Electoral Officer (1999). Statement of Votes for the 37th Provincial General Election, September 21, 1999 (PDF) (Report). Winnipeg: Elections Manitoba.

=== 1932 ===
1932 Manitoba general election
Party	Candidate	Votes	%	±%
Liberal–Progressive	Douglas Lloyd Campbell	1,969	56.40	–
Conservative	John Pigott "Jack" Bend	1,522	43.60	-3.31
Total valid votes		3,491	–	–
Rejected		N/A	–	
Eligible voters / Turnout		3,917	89.12	11.86
Source(s) Source: Manitoba. Chief Electoral Officer (1999). Statement of Votes for the 37th Provincial General Election, September 21, 1999 (PDF) (Report). Winnipeg: Elections Manitoba.

=== 1927 ===
1927 Manitoba general election
Party	Candidate	Votes	%	±%
Progressive	Douglas Lloyd Campbell	1,442	53.09	–
Conservative	John Pigott "Jack" Bend	1,274	46.91	6.01
Total valid votes		2,716	–	–
Rejected		N/A	–	
Eligible voters / Turnout		3,515	77.27	-4.48
Source(s) Source: Manitoba. Chief Electoral Officer (1999). Statement of Votes for the 37th Provincial General Election, September 21, 1999 (PDF) (Report). Winnipeg: Elections Manitoba.

=== 1922 ===
1922 Manitoba general election
Party	Candidate	Votes	%	±%
United Farmers	Douglas Lloyd Campbell	1,591	59.10	–
Conservative	Herbert Muir	1,101	40.90	–
Total valid votes		2,692	–	–
Rejected		N/A	–	
Eligible voters / Turnout		3,293	81.75	–
Source(s) Source: Manitoba. Chief Electoral Officer (1999). Statement of Votes for the 37th Provincial General Election, September 21, 1999 (PDF) (Report). Winnipeg: Elections Manitoba.

=== 1921 by-election ===
Manitoba provincial by-election, 1921
Party	Candidate	Votes	%	±%
Liberal	Charles Duncan McPherson	1,176	53.55	3.03
Farmer	Edwin Herbert Muir	1,020	46.45	–
Total valid votes		2,196	–	–
Rejected		N/A	–	
Eligible voters / Turnout		N/A	–	–
Source(s) Source: Manitoba. Chief Electoral Officer (1999). Statement of Votes for the 37th Provincial General Election, September 21, 1999 (PDF) (Report). Winnipeg: Elections Manitoba.

=== 1920 ===
1920 Manitoba general election
Party	Candidate	Votes	%	±%
Liberal	Charles Duncan McPherson	1,104	50.53	-4.69
Conservative	Edwin Herbert Muir	1,081	49.47	4.69
Total valid votes		2,185	–	–
Rejected		N/A	–	
Eligible voters / Turnout		2,968	73.62	-11.65
Source(s) Source: Manitoba. Chief Electoral Officer (1999). Statement of Votes for the 37th Provincial General Election, September 21, 1999 (PDF) (Report). Winnipeg: Elections Manitoba.

=== 1915 ===
1915 Manitoba general election
Party	Candidate	Votes	%	±%
Liberal	Charles Duncan McPherson	863	55.21	5.64
Conservative	John J. Garland	700	44.79	-5.64
Total valid votes		1,563	–	–
Rejected		N/A	–	
Eligible voters / Turnout		1,833	85.27	-7.69
Source(s) Source: Manitoba. Chief Electoral Officer (1999). Statement of Votes for the 37th Provincial General Election, September 21, 1999 (PDF) (Report). Winnipeg: Elections Manitoba.

=== 1914 ===
1914 Manitoba general election
Party	Candidate	Votes	%	±%
Conservative	John J. Garland	839	50.42	3.59
Liberal	Charles Duncan McPherson	825	49.58	-3.59
Total valid votes		1,664	–	–
Rejected		N/A	–	
Eligible voters / Turnout		1,790	92.96	3.85
Source(s) Source: Manitoba. Chief Electoral Officer (1999). Statement of Votes for the 37th Provincial General Election, September 21, 1999 (PDF) (Report). Winnipeg: Elections Manitoba.

=== 1910 ===
1910 Manitoba general election
Party	Candidate	Votes	%	±%
Liberal	Charles Duncan McPherson	570	53.17	4.68
Conservative	Edwin D. Lynch	502	46.83	-4.68
Total valid votes		1,072	–	–
Rejected		N/A	–	
Eligible voters / Turnout		1,203	89.11	8.88
Source(s) Source: Manitoba. Chief Electoral Officer (1999). Statement of Votes for the 37th Provincial General Election, September 21, 1999 (PDF) (Report). Winnipeg: Elections Manitoba.

=== 1907 ===
1907 Manitoba general election
Party	Candidate	Votes	%	±%
Conservative	Edwin D. Lynch	460	51.51	-1.87
Liberal	Peter McArthur	433	48.49	1.87
Total valid votes		893	–	–
Rejected		N/A	–	
Eligible voters / Turnout		1,113	80.23	-7.63
Source(s) Source: Manitoba. Chief Electoral Officer (1999). Statement of Votes for the 37th Provincial General Election, September 21, 1999 (PDF) (Report). Winnipeg: Elections Manitoba.

=== 1903 ===
1903 Manitoba general election
Party	Candidate	Votes	%	±%
Conservative	Edwin D. Lynch	537	53.38	5.02
Liberal	William Fulton	469	46.62	-5.02
Total valid votes		1,006	–	–
Rejected		N/A	–	
Eligible voters / Turnout		1,145	87.86	6.46
Source(s) Source: Manitoba. Chief Electoral Officer (1999). Statement of Votes for the 37th Provincial General Election, September 21, 1999 (PDF) (Report). Winnipeg: Elections Manitoba.

=== 1899 ===
1899 Manitoba general election
Party	Candidate	Votes	%	±%
Liberal	James McKenzie	409	51.64	–
Conservative	Edwin D. Lynch	383	48.36	–
Total valid votes		792	–	–
Rejected		N/A	–	
Eligible voters / Turnout		973	81.40	–
Source(s) Source: Manitoba. Chief Electoral Officer (1999). Statement of Votes for the 37th Provincial General Election, September 21, 1999 (PDF) (Report). Winnipeg: Elections Manitoba.

=== 1896 by-election ===
Manitoba provincial by-election, 1896
Party	Candidate	Votes	%	±%
Government	James McKenzie	299	54.66	–
Patrons of Industry	Daniel William McCuaig	248	45.34	–
Total valid votes		547	–	–
Rejected		N/A	–	
Eligible voters / Turnout		N/A	–	–
Source(s) Source: Manitoba. Chief Electoral Officer (1999). Statement of Votes for the 37th Provincial General Election, September 21, 1999 (PDF) (Report). Winnipeg: Elections Manitoba.

=== 1896 ===
1896 Manitoba general election
Party	Candidate	Votes	%	±%
Liberal	John Gunion Rutherford		0.00	-60.92
Total valid votes			–	–
Rejected		N/A	–	
Eligible voters / Turnout		748	0.00	-86.57
Source(s) Source: Manitoba. Chief Electoral Officer (1999). Statement of Votes for the 37th Provincial General Election, September 21, 1999 (PDF) (Report). Winnipeg: Elections Manitoba.

=== 1892 ===
1892 Manitoba general election
Party	Candidate	Votes	%	±%
Liberal	John Gunion Rutherford	424	60.92	4.08
Conservative	J. E. Wallace	272	39.08	-4.08
Total valid votes		696	–	–
Rejected		N/A	–	
Eligible voters / Turnout		804	86.57	–
Source(s) Source: Manitoba. Chief Electoral Officer (1999). Statement of Votes for the 37th Provincial General Election, September 21, 1999 (PDF) (Report). Winnipeg: Elections Manitoba.

=== 1888 ===
1888 Manitoba general election
Party	Candidate	Votes	%	±%
Liberal	Kenneth McKenzie	324	56.84	5.98
Conservative	A. A. McLennan	246	43.16	-5.98
Total valid votes		570	–	–
Rejected		N/A	–	
Eligible voters / Turnout		N/A	–	–
Source(s) Source: Manitoba. Chief Electoral Officer (1999). Statement of Votes for the 37th Provincial General Election, September 21, 1999 (PDF) (Report). Winnipeg: Elections Manitoba.

=== 1886 ===
1886 Manitoba general election
Party	Candidate	Votes	%
Liberal	Kenneth McKenzie	323	50.87
Conservative	Isaiah Mawhinney	312	49.13
Total valid votes		635	–
Rejected		N/A	–
Eligible voters / Turnout		1,028	61.77
Source(s) Source: Manitoba. Chief Electoral Officer (1999). Statement of Votes for the 37th Provincial General Election, September 21, 1999 (PDF) (Report). Winnipeg: Elections Manitoba.

== Previous boundaries ==
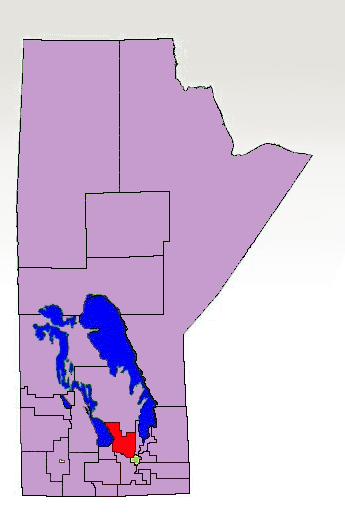
The 1998–2011 boundaries for Lakeside electoral district highlighted in red

== See also ==
- List of Manitoba provincial electoral districts
- Canadian provincial electoral districts
