= Harry Enns =

Canadian politician

Harry Enns (November 30, 1931 – June 24, 2010) was a Manitoba politician. He served as a Cabinet Minister in the governments of Dufferin Roblin, Walter Weir, Sterling Lyon and Gary Filmon, and was an unsuccessful candidate for the leadership of the Progressive Conservative Party of Manitoba in 1971. A long-serving member of the Manitoba legislature, he retired from public life in 2003.

The son of Reverend John Herman Enns, a minister for the First Mennonite Church, and Agathe Unruh, Enns was born in Winnipeg, Manitoba. In 1953 he married Helene Klassen, the daughter of John and Lola Klassen. In 1962 the family relocated to the community of Woodlands in the Interlake region where he built a cattle ranch, a profession that he remained active in for the remainder of his life. He was divorced from Helene in 1976. He was remarried to Eleanor Jones in 1984. His brother Siegfried John Enns served in the Canadian House of Commons. Another brother Ernest Enns was a city alderman in the City of Winnipeg from 1960 to 1970.

== Legislative career ==
A Progressive Conservative, Enns was first elected to the Legislative Assembly of Manitoba in 1966, for the rural riding of Rockwood-Iberville.

In 1969, redistribution placed Enns in the riding of Lakeside, where he defeated Liberal leader Robert Bend by about 350 votes. However, he would never face another election nearly that close, and was reelected in 1973, 1977, 1981, 1986, 1988, 1990, 1995 and 1999. He held the seat for 34 years; his predecessor, former Premier of Manitoba Douglas Campbell, had held it for 47 years.

== Career as cabinet minister ==
Enns was appointed Minister of Agriculture by Dufferin Roblin on July 22, 1967. He retained this position when Walter Weir replaced Roblin as Premier later in the year, also becoming the Acting Minister of Highways (Enns had supported Weir in the party's leadership contest). On September 5, 1968, he was moved to the Ministry of Mines and Natural Resources.

Enns found himself at the centre of a significant controversy in early 1969, when he announced that the Manitoba government would allow Manitoba Hydro to flood South Indian Lake in the northern part of the province. This announcement was widely criticized, as the plan threatened serious disruption for indigenous communities in the area. Some critics argued that the plan itself was unviable, while others argued that the government did not adequately consult with the affected communities. The Manitoba Indian Brotherhood came out in opposition to the scheme, as did the Liberals and New Democrats, and the planned flooding became a significant issue in the 1969 provincial election.

In the government of Sterling Lyon, Enns served as Minister of Public Works and Minister of Highways from October 24, 1977 to October 20, 1978; Minister of Highways and Transport (a renamed position) from October 20, 1978 to November 15, 1979; Minister of Government Services from April 12, 1979 to January 16, 1981; and Minister of Natural Resources from January 16, 1981 to November 30, 1981. He was not a candidate to succeed Lyon as party leader in 1983, however.

Enns was not named to Gary Filmon's first cabinet, but became Minister of Natural Resources on April 21, 1989. He held this position until September 10, 1993, when he became Minister of Agriculture for a second time (after a gap of twenty-five years). He continued to hold this portfolio until the Filmon government was defeated in 1999, and was responsible for managing the AIDA and NISA files during the flood emergency of 1997.

== Intraparty activity ==
In 1971, Enns declared himself a candidate to replace Weir as leader of the Manitoba Progressive Conservatives. The contest highlighted the ideological divisions of the party: Enns, who represented its rural and conservative wing, lost to urban progressive Sidney Spivak by 46 votes.

In 2000, he supported Stockwell Day for the leadership of the Canadian Alliance party.

== Politics and controversies ==
In 1976, Enns nearly derailed plans by the Schreyer government to bring a series of Russian artworks from Leningrad's Hermitage and the State Russian Museum to Manitoba, during a North American tour. His position was grounded in an opposition to Communism and the Soviet Union, though he eventually withdrew his objections.

During the mid-1980s, Enns was a vocal opponent of officially re-entrenching French-language services in Manitoba (a policy being pursued by the New Democratic government of Howard Pawley). Ironically, his seat was targeted by the anti-bilingualism Confederation of Regions Party in 1986, although this challenge ultimately came to very little.

A philosophical conservative, Enns was also responsible for weakening market board control over Manitoba's hog farms, and appears to have had similar intentions regarding its fishing industry. In 1995-96, he was accused of approving illegal fishing activities by the Spirit River Fish Company, though he denied this charge.

Perhaps his greatest contribution to Canada, was the role he played in the legalizing of industrial hemp. At a time when the public mood was anti cannabis, Harry was the first politician of power, to stand and risk his reputation, in order to help Manitoba farmers. The three experimental hemp plot trials he sanctioned in 1995, 1996, and 1997 yielded key information that convinced Health Canada to allow hemp crops to go to seed, which birthed the hemp food industry.

== Later life ==
Enns died following heart surgery at the age of 78.
