= James McKenzie (Manitoba politician) =

Canadian Manitoba politician and farmer (1854–1936)

James McKenzie (April 23, 1854 – February 12, 1936) was a farmer and political figure in Manitoba. He represented Lakeside from 1896 to 1903 in the Legislative Assembly of Manitoba as a Liberal.

== Background ==
McKenzie was born in Aberfoyle, Wellington County, Canada West, the son of Kenneth McKenzie and Jane Condy, both natives of Scotland. In 1895, McKenzie married Mary S. Hill. He was elected to the Manitoba assembly in an 1896 by-election held after John Gunion Rutherford resigned his seat.

== McKenzie's Passing ==
McKenzie died in Brandon at the age of 81.
