= Douglas Lloyd Campbell =

Premier of Manitoba from 1948 to 1958

Douglas Lloyd Campbell OC

13th Premier of Manitoba
- In office November 13, 1948 – June 30, 1958
- Monarchs: George VI; Elizabeth II
- Lieutenant Governor: Roland F. McWilliams; John S. McDiarmid
- Preceded by: Stuart Garson
- Succeeded by: Dufferin Roblin

Member of the Legislative Assembly of Manitoba for Lakeside
- In office July 18, 1922 – June 25, 1969
- Preceded by: Charles Duncan McPherson
- Succeeded by: Harry Enns

Personal details
- Born: May 27, 1895 Portage la Prairie, Manitoba, Canada
- Died: April 23, 1995 (aged 99) Winnipeg, Manitoba, Canada
- Party: Progressive (1922–1932); Liberal-Progressive (1932–1961); Liberal (1961–1969)
- Spouse: Gladys Victoria Crampton (m. 1920) (1898-1987)
- Children: 7
- Education: Brandon University
- Occupation: farmer and school teacher
- Profession: politician
- Cabinet: Minister of Agriculture (1936–1948); Minister of Manitoba Power Commission (1944–1948); President of the Council (1948–1958); Minister Dominion-Provincial Relations (1948–1958)

Douglas Lloyd Campbell OC (May 27, 1895 – April 23, 1995) was a Canadian politician in Manitoba. He served as the 13th premier of Manitoba from 1948 to 1958. He was a member of the Legislative Assembly of Manitoba for 47 years, longer than anyone in the province's history.

== Early life ==
Born in Portage la Prairie, Manitoba, the son of John Howard Campbell and Mary Campbell, Campbell was educated there and in Brandon. He worked as a farmer and school teacher before entering politics. He was also active as a Freemason, serving as master of Assiniboine Lodge No. 7 in Portage. He married, in 1920, Gladys Victoria Crampton, daughter of William Nassau Crampton and Elizabeth Dezell. They had eight children together, though the last child died soon after birth.

== Provincial political career ==
In 1922, Campbell defeated several other contenders to become the United Farmers of Manitoba (UFM) candidate in Lakeside, north of Winnipeg. At the UFM nomination meeting, he made a virtue of his inexperience as a professional politician. A commanding speaker, he was soon regarded as a rising star in the party.

The UFM swept Manitoba's countryside in 1922, and Campbell defeated his only opponent, Conservative Herbert Muir, by about 500 votes. He faced opposition from Conservative J.R. Bend in 1927 and 1932, but won on both occasions. No other party ran a candidate against him during this period.

The UFM, which governed as the Progressive Party of Manitoba, was founded on an ideology of non-partisan, managerial government, with special attention to rural concerns. The Progressives formed an alliance with the Manitoba Liberal Party in 1932, and Campbell (among with the others in his party) subsequently became known as a "Liberal-Progressive". He again faced Conservative opposition in 1936, this time winning by about 350 votes.

=== Cabinet minister ===
On December 21, 1936, Campbell was sworn in as Minister of Agriculture in John Bracken's government. He also became Minister of the Manitoba Power Commission on February 5, 1944. In this capacity, he was responsible for overseeing a rural electrification program, which created the framework for Manitoba Hydro.

Bracken's government was expanded into an all-party coalition in 1940, with the Conservatives, Manitoba Co-operative Commonwealth Federation and Social Credit all holding cabinet positions. Campbell faced no opposition in the election of 1941, and also won by acclamation in 1945 and 1949.

=== Premier of Manitoba ===
John Bracken jumped from provincial to federal politics in 1943, and his successor Stuart Garson did the same in 1948. On the latter occasion, Campbell defeated Conservative leader Errick Willis in a vote of the coalition caucuses to become the province's next Premier. He was sworn in on November 13, 1948, only the second native-born Manitoban to serve in this office. On December 14 of the same year, he also became Minister of Dominion-Provincial Relations. The selection of Campbell was opposed by many Conservatives, some of whom called for a new coalition agreement.

Campbell's government continued the rural electrification program begun by Garson. However, it was otherwise cautious and conservative, opposing government expansion and bilingualism. Campbell commissioned a study on alcohol sales (written by former Premier Bracken) that brought about some reforms; nevertheless, the province maintained a number of restrictive "blue laws" on alcohol and Sunday shopping. Manitoba's education system remained backwards, having the most one room schoolhouses in Canada. Despite the Liberal label, Campbell's government was one of the most right-wing provincial governments in Canada.

The coalition government ended in 1950, with the Progressive Conservatives (which the Conservatives became after 1942) leaving in protest against Campbell's 'minimal-government' philosophy. The Tories were still led by Errick Willis, although the impetus for separation had come primarily from MLA Dufferin Roblin.

The Manitoba Tories had more or less vanished at the grassroots level during the coalition government, and in the 1953 election, Campbell's Liberal-Progressives won a convincing victory (32 of 57 seats). After the election, Roblin replaced Willis as leader of the Progressive Conservatives and developed a platform of infrastructural development and modernization. Campbell's opposition to any sort of state intervention essentially put him further to the right of the Tory opposition by this time.

Campbell often had poor relations with the federal Liberals in the late 1950s, despite the fact that Garson was a powerful cabinet minister for the party. John Diefenbaker's upset victory of 1957 was partly based on unexpected support from Manitoba—Campbell later claimed that he contributed to the federal Liberal defeat.

The provincial election of 1958 resulted in a hung parliament, with the Tories winning 26 seats against 19 for the Liberal-Progressives, and 11 for the CCF, and one Independent. Campbell initially offered to govern in alliance with the CCF, but discussions between the parties went nowhere. When it became apparent that the CCF was instead willing to support the Tories, Campbell resigned as Premier on June 30. The next year, Roblin's Tories won a parliamentary majority and Campbell's Liberal-Progressives were reduced to 11 seats.

=== Post-premiership ===
Campbell remained as Leader of the Opposition until 1961, when he resigned as leader of what was by now known as the Manitoba Liberal Party; Gildas Molgat succeeded him. He continued to serve as MLA for Lakeside until standing down in 1969, and exercised a powerful influence over the Liberals during this time. His 47 continuous years in the legislature (including 25 years as a minister or opposition frontbencher) remains a provincial record.

== Later life ==
Campbell resurfaced in the 1980s as a supporter of populist conservative movements—first the Confederation of Regions Party, and subsequently the Reform Party of Preston Manning. He also spoke at rallies for Sidney Green's Progressive Party, noting parallels to the earlier party of the same name.

Campbell's political philosophy remained consistent through his shifting party allegiances. Sidney Green (who began his career as a socialist) once described him as "the most politically conservative politician I knew during my years in politics". On economic and social issues alike, he opposed most government intervention into the lives of citizens. Although not a libertarian, he was a lifelong believer in "small government".

In 1972, he was made an Officer of the Order of Canada.

Douglas Campbell died on 23 April 1995 at the age of 99. His wife died in 1987.
