= John Walter Scott Biggar =

Canadian politician

Ontario MPP
- In office 1886–1890
- Preceded by: John Gillies
- Succeeded by: John George
- Constituency: Bruce North

Personal details
- Born: March 21, 1843 Woolwich, England
- Died: July 3, 1897 (aged 54) Saugeen, Ontario
- Party: Conservative
- Spouse: Margaret Geddes (m. 1873)
- Occupation: Farmer

John Walter Scott Biggar (March 21, 1843 – July 3, 1897) was an Ontario, Canada farmer and political figure. He represented Bruce North in the Legislative Assembly of Ontario as a Conservative member from 1886 to 1890.

He was born in Woolwich, England, in 1843; his father and mother were born in Scotland. He was educated in the Netherlands and London and later came to Saugeen Township, Canada West with his family in 1859. In 1873, he married Margaret Geddes. He served in the militia, travelling with Colonel Wolsely's Red River expedition in 1870, and later became lieutenant-colonel in the local militia. He died in 1897.

== Electoral history ==
1879 Ontario general election: Bruce North
Party	Candidate	Votes	%	±%
Liberal	Donald Sinclair	1,686	56.77	+0.82
Conservative	John Walter Scott Biggar	1,284	43.23	
Total valid votes		2,970	63.41	−5.34
Eligible voters		4,684		
Liberal hold		Swing		+0.82
Source: Elections Ontario
