= William Henry Fenton =

Canadian politician from Ontario

Member of the Ontario Provincial Parliament for Bruce North
- In office October 20, 1919 – October 18, 1926
- Preceded by: William MacDonald
- Succeeded by: Alexander Patterson Mewhinney

Personal details
- Born: November 24, 1883 Arran Township, Ontario
- Died: February 7, 1972 (aged 88) Tara, Ontario
- Party: United Farmers of Ontario

William Henry Fenton (24 November 1883 – 7 February 1972) was a Canadian veteran of World War I and a politician from the United Farmers of Ontario. He represented Bruce North in the Legislative Assembly of Ontario from 1919 to 1926.

== See also ==
- 15th Parliament of Ontario
- 16th Parliament of Ontario
