= Bruce North (provincial electoral district) =

Ontario electoral district

Defunct provincial electoral district
- Legislature: Legislative Assembly of Ontario
- District created: 1867
- District abolished: 1933
- First contested: 1867
- Last contested: 1929

Bruce North was an electoral riding in Ontario, Canada. It was created in 1867 at the time of confederation and was abolished in 1933 before the 1934 election.

== Members of Provincial Parliament ==
Bruce North
Assembly	Years	Member	Party
1st	1867–1871	Donald Sinclair	Liberal
2nd	1871–1874	Donald Sinclair	Liberal
3rd	1875–1879	Donald Sinclair	Liberal
4th	1879–1883	Donald Sinclair	Liberal
5th	1883–1886	John Gillies	Liberal
6th	1886–1890	John Walter Scott Biggar	Conservative
7th	1890–1891	John George	Conservative
7th	1891–1893	David Porter	Liberal
7th	1893–1894	Daniel McNaughton	Liberal-PPA
8th	1894–1898	Daniel McNaughton	Liberal-PPA
9th	1898–1902	Charles Martin Bowman	Liberal
10th	1902–1904	Charles Martin Bowman	Liberal
11th	1905–1908	Charles Martin Bowman	Liberal
12th	1908–1911	Charles Martin Bowman	Liberal
13th	1911–1914	Charles Martin Bowman	Liberal
14th	1914–1919	William MacDonald	Liberal
15th	1919–1923	William Henry Fenton	United Farmers
16th	1923–1926	William Henry Fenton	United Farmers
17th	1926–1929	Alexander Patterson Mewhinney	Liberal
18th	1929–1934	Frederick Wellington Elliott	Liberal
Sourced from the Ontario Legislative Assembly
Merged into Bruce before the 1934 election

== Election results ==
1929 Ontario general election
Party	Candidate	Votes	%	±%
Liberal	Frederick Wellington Elliott	4,520	52.09	+13.69
Conservative	David James Byers	4,158	47.91	+16.59
Total valid votes		8,678	99.50	
Total rejected ballots		44	0.50	+0.16
Turnout		8,722	70.52	+0.89
Eligible voters		12,368		
Liberal hold		Swing		–1.45
Source: Elections Ontario

1926 Ontario general election
Party	Candidate	Votes	%	±%
Liberal	Alexander Patterson Mewhinney	3,601	38.39	+13.46
Conservative	David James Byers	2,938	31.33	–3.78
Progressive	William Henry Fenton	2,840	30.28	–9.69
Total valid votes		9,379	99.66	
Total rejected ballots		32	0.34	–0.54
Turnout		9,411	69.63	–6.35
Eligible voters		13,516		
Liberal gain from United Farmers		Swing		+8.62
Source: Elections Ontario

1923 Ontario general election
Party	Candidate	Votes	%	±%
United Farmers	William Henry Fenton	2,557	39.97	–14.12
Conservative	William Henry Brown	2,246	35.10	–10.81
Liberal	Mathew Alexander Halliday	1,595	24.93	–
Total valid votes		6,398	99.12	
Total rejected ballots		57	0.88	–1.20
Turnout		6,455	75.98	–0.94
Eligible voters		8,496		
United Farmers hold		Swing		–1.65
Source: Elections Ontario

1919 Ontario general election
Party	Candidate	Votes	%	±%
United Farmers	William Henry Fenton	3,689	54.08	–
Conservative	William McDonald	3,132	45.92	–3.98
Total valid votes		6,821	97.92	
Total rejected ballots		145	2.08	+1.45
Turnout		6,966	76.91	–25.08
Eligible voters		9,057		
United Farmers gain from Liberal		Swing		+1.99
Source: Elections Ontario

1914 Ontario general election
Party	Candidate	Votes	%	±%
Liberal	William McDonald	1,736	50.10	–4.82
Conservative	Harold Alva Vandusen	1,729	49.90	+4.82
Total valid votes		3,465	99.37	
Total rejected ballots		22	0.63	+0.13
Turnout		3,487	101.99	+29.04
Eligible voters		3,419		
Liberal hold		Swing		–4.82
Source: Elections Ontario

1911 Ontario general election
Party	Candidate	Votes	%	±%
Liberal	Charles Martin Bowman	2,182	54.92	+0.93
Conservative	Harold Alva Vandusen	1,791	45.08	–0.93
Total valid votes		3,973	99.50	
Total rejected ballots		20	0.50	+0.01
Turnout		3,993	72.94	–7.91
Eligible voters		5,474		
Liberal hold		Swing		+0.93
Source: Elections Ontario

1908 Ontario general election
Party	Candidate	Votes	%	±%
Liberal	Charles Martin Bowman	2,282	53.99	+3.04
Conservative	David M. Jermyn	1,945	46.01	–3.04
Total valid votes		4,227	99.51	
Total rejected ballots		21	0.49	–0.18
Turnout		4,248	80.85	+9.03
Eligible voters		5,254		
Liberal hold		Swing		+3.04
Source: Elections Ontario

1905 Ontario general election
Party	Candidate	Votes	%	±%
Liberal	Charles Martin Bowman	2,162	50.94	–1.92
Conservative	John George	2,082	49.06	+1.92
Total valid votes		4,244	99.32	
Total rejected ballots		29	0.68	–0.17
Turnout		4,273	71.83	–5.02
Eligible voters		5,949		
Liberal hold		Swing		–1.92
Source: Elections Ontario

1902 Ontario general election
Party	Candidate	Votes	%	±%
Liberal	Charles Martin Bowman	2,477	52.86	+0.02
Conservative	David M. Jermyn	2,209	47.14	–0.02
Total valid votes		4,686	99.15	
Total rejected ballots		40	0.85	+0.40
Turnout		4,726	76.85	–5.24
Eligible voters		6,150		
Liberal hold		Swing		+0.02
Source: Elections Ontario

1898 Ontario general election
Party	Candidate	Votes	%	±%
Liberal	Charles Martin Bowman	2,464	52.84	+20.56
Conservative	David M. Jermyn	2,199	47.16	+18.79
Total valid votes		4,663	99.55	
Total rejected ballots		21	0.45	+0.42
Turnout		4,684	82.09	+18.48
Eligible voters		5,706		
Liberal gain from Protestant Protective		Swing		+0.89
Source: Elections Ontario

1894 Ontario general election
Party	Candidate	Votes	%	±%
Protestant Protective	Daniel McNaughton	1,369	39.35	–4.23
Liberal	A. D. McConnell	1,123	32.28	–11.30
Conservative	William McIntosh	987	28.37	–1.71
Total valid votes		3,479	99.97	
Total rejected ballots		1	0.03	–0.55
Turnout		3,480	63.61	–5.99
Eligible voters		5,471		
Protestant Protective gain from Liberal		Swing		–1.26
Source: Elections Ontario

Ontario provincial by-election, December 2, 1893 Death of David Porter
Party	Candidate	Votes	%	±%
Liberal	Daniel McNaughton	1,640	43.58	–20.97
Conservative	John George	1,132	30.08	–5.36
Unknown	Pierson	991	26.34	–
Total valid votes		3,763	99.42	
Total rejected ballots		22	0.58	+0.58
Turnout		3,785	69.60	–
Eligible voters		5,438		
Liberal hold		Swing		–7.81
Source: Elections Ontario

Ontario provincial by-election, March 3, 1891 1890 Election void
Party	Candidate	Votes	%	±%
Liberal	David Porter	683	64.56	+14.79
Conservative	John George	375	35.44	–14.79
Total valid votes		1,058	100.00	
Total rejected ballots		–		
Turnout		1,058	–	–
Eligible voters				
Liberal gain from Conservative		Swing		+14.79
Source: Elections Ontario

1890 Ontario general election
Party	Candidate	Votes	%	±%
Conservative	John George	1,835	50.23	–1.54
Liberal	David Porter	1,818	49.77	+1.54
Total valid votes		3,653	99.37	
Total rejected ballots		23	0.63	+0.12
Turnout		3,676	70.83	+2.50
Eligible voters		5,190		
Conservative hold		Swing		–1.54
Source: Elections Ontario

1886 Ontario general election
Party	Candidate	Votes	%	±%
Conservative	John Walter Scott Biggar	1,738	51.77	–
Liberal	John Melbourne (J. M.) Kilbourn	1,619	48.23	+0.89
Total valid votes		3,357	99.50	
Total rejected ballots		17	0.50	+0.50
Turnout		3,374	68.33	+24.09
Eligible voters		4,938		
Conservative gain from Independent Liberal		Swing		–0.45
Source: Elections Ontario

1883 Ontario general election
Party	Candidate	Votes	%	±%
Independent Liberal	John Gillies	1,186	52.66	–
Liberal	James Rowand	1,066	47.34	–9.43
Total valid votes		2,252	100.00	
Total rejected ballots		–		
Turnout		2,252	44.23	–19.17
Eligible voters		5,091		
Independent Liberal gain from Liberal		Swing		–
Source: Elections Ontario

1879 Ontario general election
Party	Candidate	Votes	%	±%
Liberal	Donald Sinclair	1,686	56.77	+0.82
Conservative	John Walter Scott Biggar	1,284	43.23	
Total valid votes		2,970	63.41	−5.34
Eligible voters		4,684		
Liberal hold		Swing		+0.82
Source: Elections Ontario

1875 Ontario general election
Party	Candidate	Votes	%
Liberal	Donald Sinclair	1,232	55.95
Independent	A.L. Sinclair	970	44.05
Turnout		2,202	68.75
Eligible voters		3,203	
Liberal hold			
Source: Elections Ontario

1871 Ontario general election
Party	Candidate	Votes
Liberal	Donald Sinclair	Acclaimed
Source: Elections Ontario

1867 Ontario general election
Party	Candidate	Votes
Liberal	Donald Sinclair	Acclaimed
Source: Elections Ontario
