= 2014 Bruce County municipal elections =

Local election in Ontario, Canada

Elections were held in Bruce County, Ontario on October 27, 2014 in conjunction with municipal elections across the province.

== Bruce County Council ==
Bruce County Council consists of the mayors of the constituent municipalities.

Position	Elected
Arran-Elderslie Mayor	Paul Eagleson
Brockton Mayor	David Inglis
Huron-Kinloss Mayor	Mitchell Twolan
Kincardine Mayor	Anne Eadie
Northern Bruce Peninsula Mayor	Milt McIver
Saugeen Shores Mayor	Mike Smith
South Bruce Mayor	Robert Buckle
South Bruce Peninsula Mayor	Janice Jackson

== Arran-Elderslie ==
Mayoral Candidate	Vote	%
Paul Eagleson (X)	1,600	62.57
John Alpaugh	957	37.43

== Brockton ==
Mayoral Candidate	Vote	%
David Inglis (X)	2,076	52.19
Charlie Bagnato	1,902	47.81

== Huron-Kinloss ==
Mayoral Candidate	Vote	%
Mitchell Twolan (X)	2,088	89.96
Arthur Koberinski	233	10.04

== Kincardine ==
Mayoral Candidate	Vote	%
Anne Eadie	3,130	66.87
Marsha Leggett	1,213	25.91
Ken Knight	338	7.22

== Northern Bruce Peninsula ==
Mayoral Candidate	Vote	%
Milt McIver (X)	2,202	59.55
John Bainbridge	963	26.04
James Mielhausen	533	14.41

== Saugeen Shores ==
Mayoral Candidate	Vote	%
Mike Smith (X)	4,262	64.36
Gregory Schmalz	1,928	29.12
Carol Garrow	432	6.52

== South Bruce ==
Mayoral Candidate	Vote	%
Robert Buckle	836	37.59
Kelly Fotheringham	727	32.24
Les Nichols	671	30.17

== South Bruce Peninsula ==
Mayoral Candidate	Vote	%
Janice Jackson	3,539	52.09
John D. Close (X)	3,255	47.91
