= Municipalities of Bruce County =

- Town of Saugeen Shores (Population centres: Port Elgin, Southampton)
- Municipality of Kincardine (Population centre: Kincardine)
- Municipality of Brockton (Population centre: Walkerton)
- Town of South Bruce Peninsula (Population centre: Wiarton)
- Municipality of Arran–Elderslie
- Township of Huron-Kinloss (Population centre: Lucknow)
- Municipality of South Bruce
- Municipality of Northern Bruce Peninsula

Also within the Bruce census division are two First Nations reserves:

- Neyaashiinigmiing
- Saugeen 29

== Historic townships ==
- Albemarle (Hope Bay, McIver, Colpoy's Bay, Mar, Red Bay) now in South Bruce Peninsula
- Amabel (Wiarton, Oliphant, Sauble Falls, Sauble Beach, Skipness, Park Head, Allenford) now in South Bruce Peninsula
- Arran (Elsinore, Tara, Invermay, Burgoyne) now in Arran-Elderslie
- Brant (Walkerton, Maple Hill, Dunkeld, Eden Grove, Vesta, Elmwood) now in Brockton
- Bruce (Tiverton, Underwood, Inverhuron) now in the Municipality of Kincardine
- Carrick (Formosa, Ambleside, Mildmay, Deemerton, Carlsruhe) now in South Bruce
- Culross (Teeswater) now in South Bruce
- Eastnor (Spry, Lion's Head, Hopeness, Pike Bay) now in Northern Bruce Peninsula
- Elderslie (Paisley, Chesley) now in Arran-Elderslie
- Greenock (Riversdale, Greenock, Chepstow, Cargill, Pinkerton, Bradley, Lovat) now in Brockton
- Huron (Pine River, Purple Grove, Verdun, Ripley) now in Huron-Kinloss
- Kincardine (Kincardine, Inverhuron, Millarton, Bervie, Armow) now in the Municipality of Kincardine
- Kinloss (Kinloss, Kinlough, Holyrood, Langside, Lucknow) now in Huron-Kinloss
- Lindsay (Cape Chin, Dyer's Bay, Stokes Bay) now in Northern Bruce Peninsula
- Saugeen (Southampton, Port Elgin) now the Town of Saugeen Shores
- St. Edmund's (Tobermory) now in Northern Bruce Peninsula
