= Brightshores Health System =

Canadian hospital management organization

Coordinates: 44°34′10″N 80°54′41″W

Brightshores Health System is a hospital network in Grey and Bruce counties in Ontario, Canada.

It operates six hospitals sites, including the 400-bed Owen Sound Regional Hospital. The other five hospitals are Lion's Head Hospital, Markdale Hospital, Meaford Hospital, Southampton Hospital and Wiarton Hospital.

As of 2022, the Chief Executive Officer was Gary Sims.

Brightshores Health System was rebranded in 2023, having been formerly known as Grey Bruce Health Services.

== Gallery ==
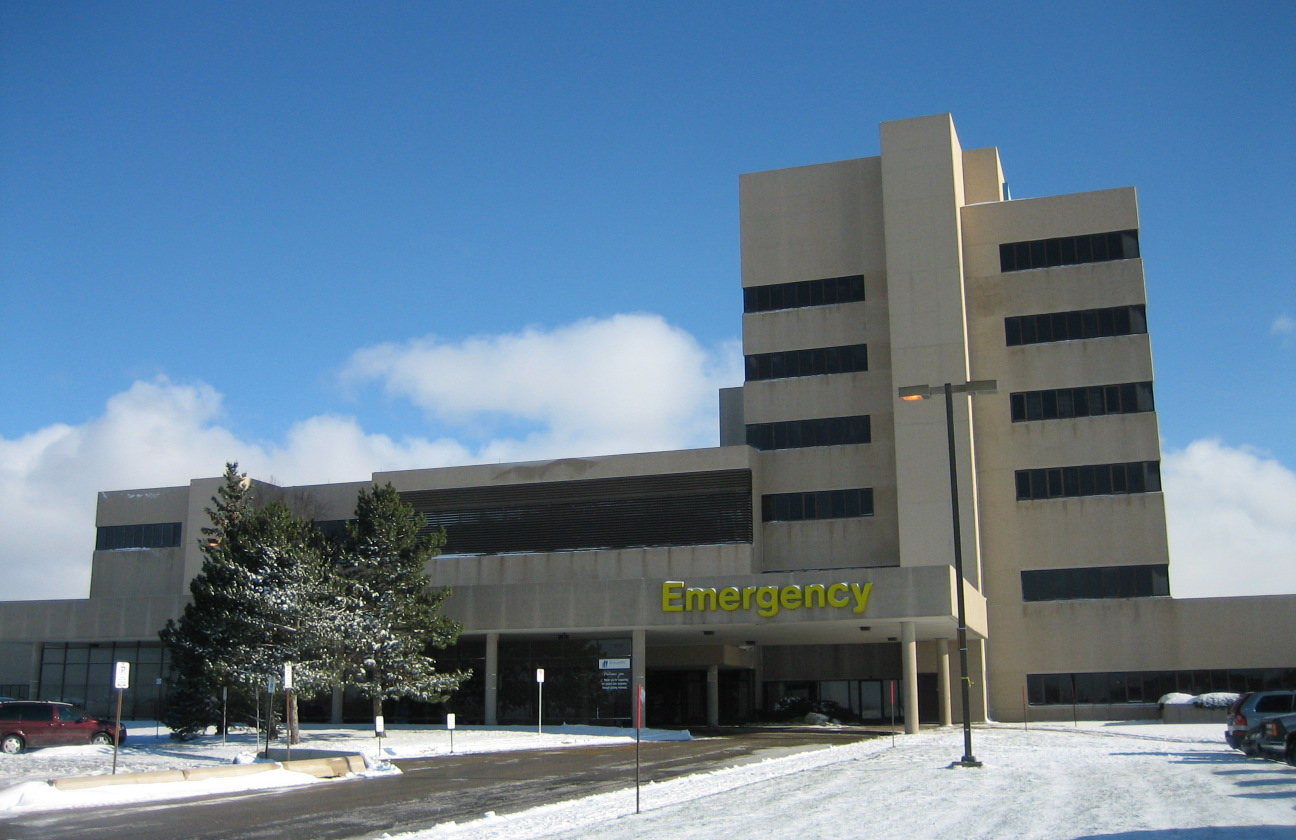
Owen Sound Hospital Emergency Department

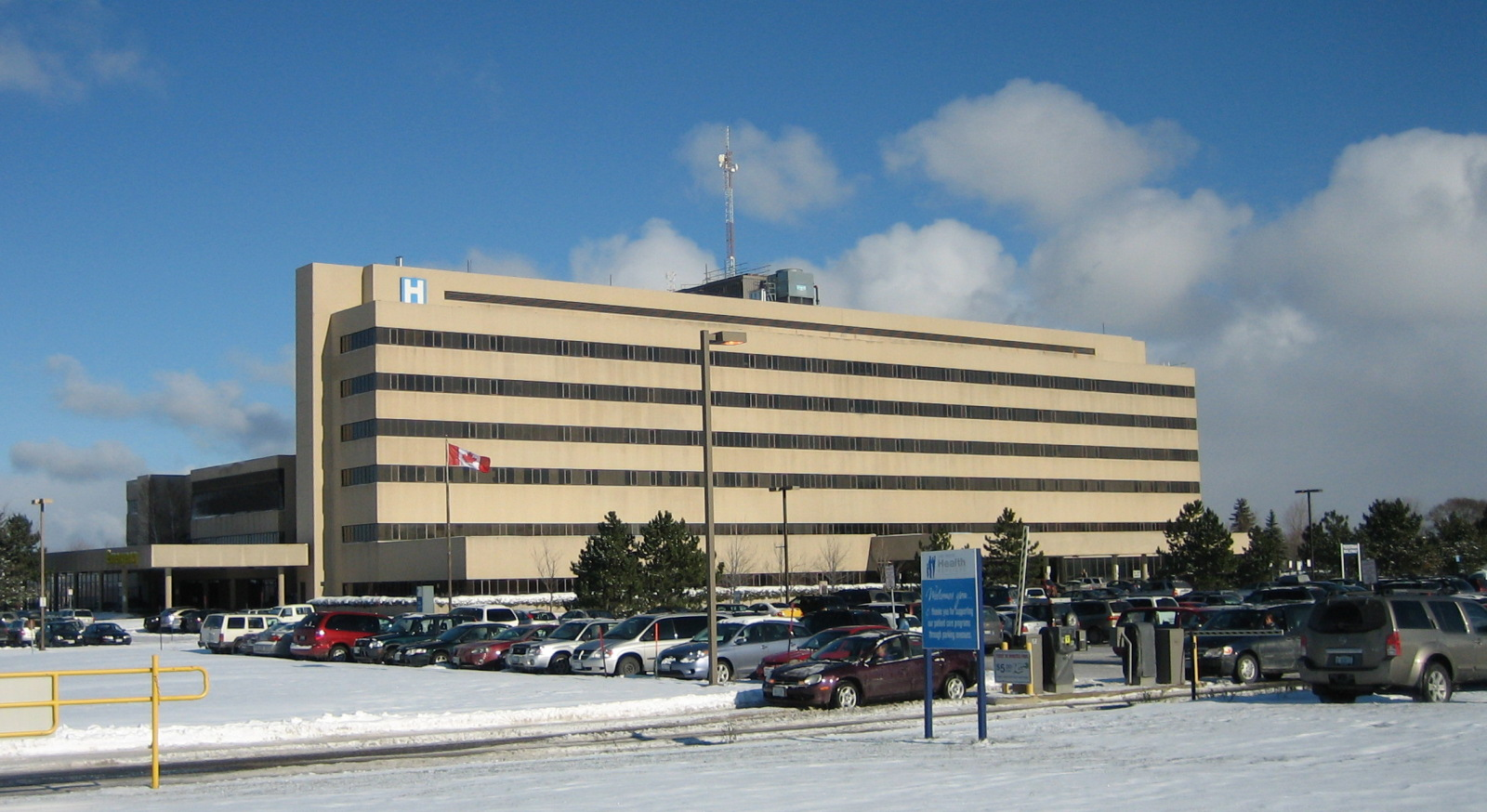
Owen Sound Hospital

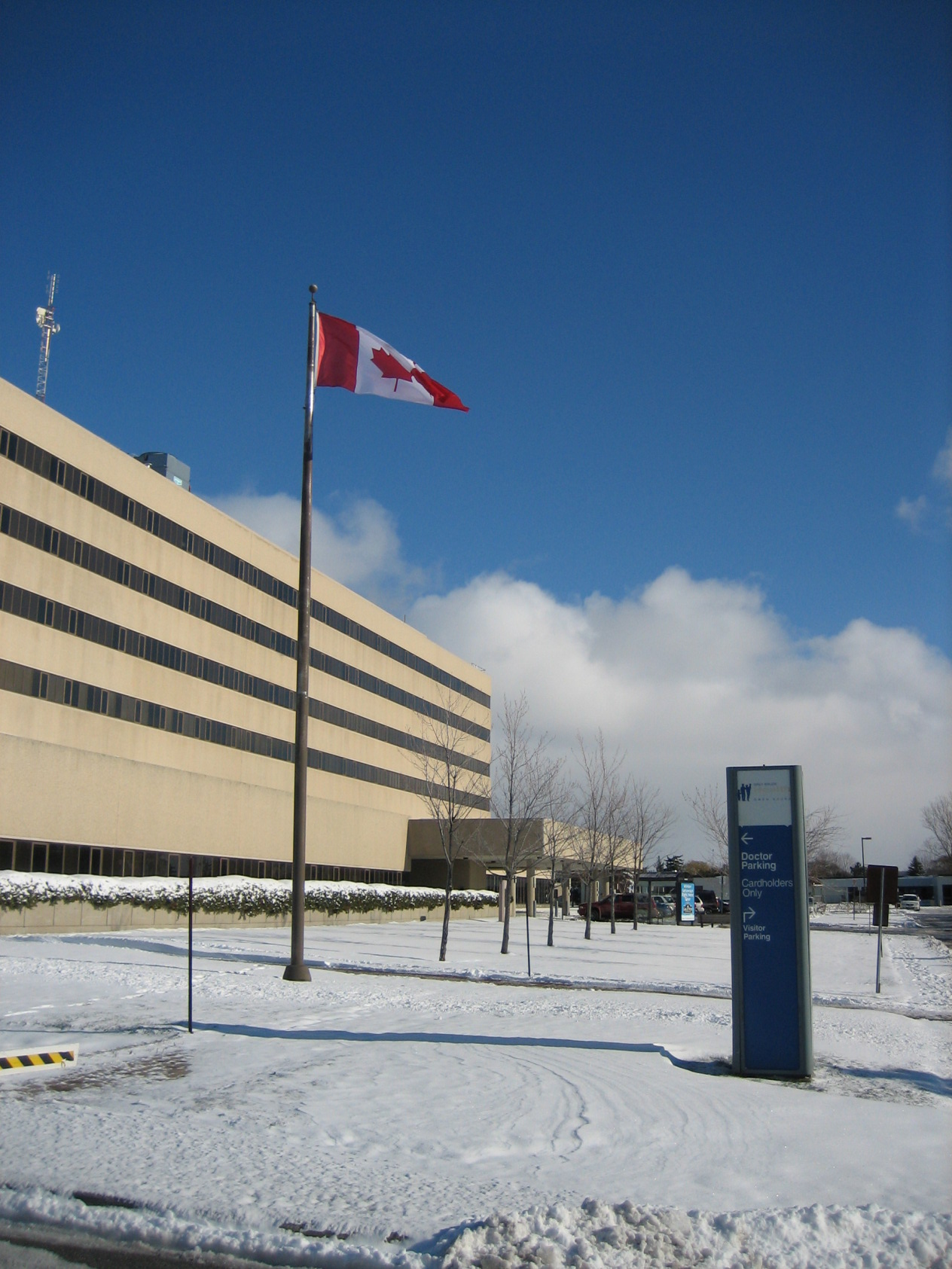
Owen Sound Hospital entrance

== See also ==
- List of hospitals in Canada
