= Ruhl Lake =

Lake in Ontario, Canada

- lac Ruhl
- Location of the lake in Southern Ontario
- Location: Bruce County, Ontario
- Coordinates: 44°10′15″N 81°04′02″W
- Part of: Lake Huron drainage basin
- Primary outflows: Ruhl Creek
- Basin countries: Canada
- Surface area: 2.97 ha (7.3 acres)
- Surface elevation: 277 m (909 ft)

Ruhl Lake (French: lac Ruhl) is a lake in the township municipality of Brockton, Bruce County in Southwestern Ontario, Canada. It is in the Lake Huron drainage basin and is the source of Ruhl Creek. The lake has an area of 2.97 hectares (7.3 acres) and lies at an elevation of 277 metres (909 ft).
