= 2010 Bruce County municipal elections =

Local election in Ontario, Canada

Elections were held in Bruce County, Ontario, Canada, on October 25, 2010, in conjunction with municipal elections across the province.

== Bruce County Council ==
Position	Elected
Arran-Elderslie Mayor	Paul Eagleson
Brockton Mayor	David Inglis
Huron-Kinloss Mayor	Mitchell Twolan
Kincardine Mayor	Larry Kraemer
Northern Bruce Peninsula Mayor	Milt McIver
Saugeen Shores Mayor	Mike Smith
South Bruce Mayor	Bill Goetz
South Bruce Peninsula Mayor	John Close

== Arran-Elderslie ==
Mayoral Candidate	Vote	%
Paul Eagleson	1,514	
John K. G. Alpaugh	781	
Peter L. McElwain	240	
William Wallace Tooke	88	

== Brockton ==
Mayoral Candidate	Vote	%
David Inglis	3,172	
Charlie Bagnato (X)	1,266	

== Huron-Kinloss ==
Mayoral Candidate	Vote	%
Mitchell Twolan (X)	Acclaimed	

== Kincardine ==
Mayoral Candidate	Vote	%
Larry A. Kraemer (X)	2,262	
Laura Haight	2,224	
Ronald J. Stephens	581	

== Northern Bruce Peninsula ==
Mayoral Candidate	Vote	%
Milt McIver (X)	2,725	
Phillip Westbrook	804	

== Saugeen Shores ==
Mayoral Candidate	Vote	%
Mike Smith (X)	4,790	
Victoria Serda	1,273	

== South Bruce ==
Mayoral Candidate	Vote	%
Bill Goetz (X)	1,319	
Les Nichols	1,024	

== South Bruce Peninsula ==
Mayoral Candidate	Vote	%
John Close	2,725	
Paul Deacon	2,273	
Gwen Gilbert (X)	1,408	
Len Chabot	256	
Jim Kerr	294	
