= Ruhl Creek =

Ruhl Creek ruisseau Ruhl
- Location of the mouth of the creek in Southern Ontario

Location
- Country: Canada
- Province: Ontario
- Region: Southwestern Ontario
- County: Bruce County
- Municipality: Brockton

Physical characteristics
- Source: Ruhl Lake
  - elevation: 277 m (909 ft)
- Mouth: Saugeen River
  - coordinates: 44°08′27″N 81°04′23″W
  - elevation: 258 m (846 ft)

Basin features
- Progression: Ruhl Creek–Saugeen River–Lake Huron
- River system: Lake Huron drainage basin

Ruhl Creek (French: ruisseau Ruhl) is a stream in the township municipality of Brockton, Bruce County in Southwestern Ontario, Canada. It is in the Lake Huron drainage basin and is a right tributary of the Saugeen River.

== Course ==
Ruhl Creek begins at Ruhl Lake at an elevation of 277 metres (909 ft) and heads south then southwest. It turns south again, flows on the east side of the settlement of Maple Hill, passes under Bruce County Road 4, and reaches its mouth as a right tributary of the Saugeen River at an elevation of 258 metres (846 ft). The Saugeen River flows to Lake Huron.
