= Bruce Peninsula District School =

Location
- 5 Moore Street; Lion's Head, Ontario, N0H 1W0; Canada
- Coordinates: 44°59′05″N 81°15′03″W

Information
- School type: Public, Elementary school and high school
- School board: Bluewater District School Board
- Area trustee: Jane Thomson
- School number: 067709 (elementary); 896969 (secondary)
- Administrator: Vicki Stevens
- Principal: Kim Harbinson
- Grades: JK–12
- Enrollment: 183 (elementary), 130 (secondary) (September 2009)
- Language: English
- Colours: Red, Blue and Gold
- Mascot: Panther (Stuffed Panther)
- Team name: Panthers
- Website: Official website

Bruce Peninsula District School is a school in the community of Lion's Head in the municipality of Northern Bruce Peninsula, Bruce County, Ontario, Canada.

== See also ==
- Education in Ontario
- List of secondary schools in Ontario
