= Ferndale, Bruce County, Ontario =

Hamlet in Ontario, Canada

Coordinates: 44.971853°N 81.287584°W

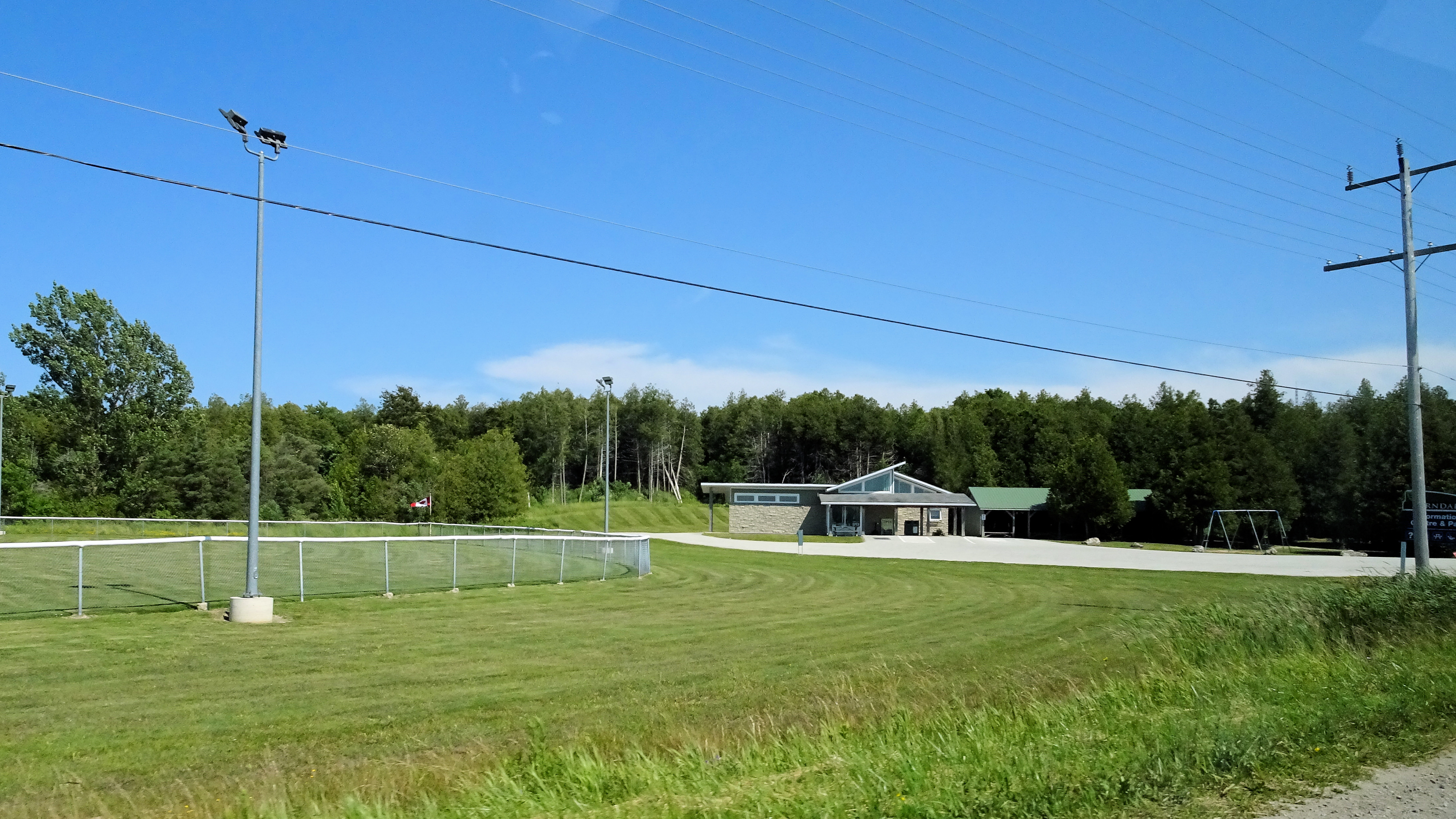
Ferndale Information Centre and ballpark

Ferndale is a hamlet in Bruce County, Ontario, Canada. Ferndale is west of Lion's Head, halfway between Owen Sound and Tobermory on the Bruce Peninsula, located at Highway 6 and Bruce Rd. 9.

The Ferndale Road that connects Ferndale and Lion's Head (Bruce Rd. 9) is also halfway between The Equator and the North Pole. The road is sometimes referred to as the 45th Parallel Road. Ferndale, has also been called "the hub of the Bruce Peninsula" due to its central location and is home to multiple businesses such as small engine repair, Bear Tracks Inn and Restaurant as well as what is known as "The Corner" which houses a UPI gas station and within the plaza also offers a Ferndale Foodmart convenience store, pizzeria, ice cream parlor & coffee shop just to name a few.

Ferndale, for recreational purposes has a ballpark which handles many games over the summer months as well has a children's playground and covered picnic area. It is now also home to the newly constructed Ferndale Information Center which can answer questions about the Bruce Peninsula, provide Public Washrooms and free WiFi.
