= Lion's Head Provincial Park =

Provincial park in Ontario, Canada

- IUCN category Ia (strict nature reserve)
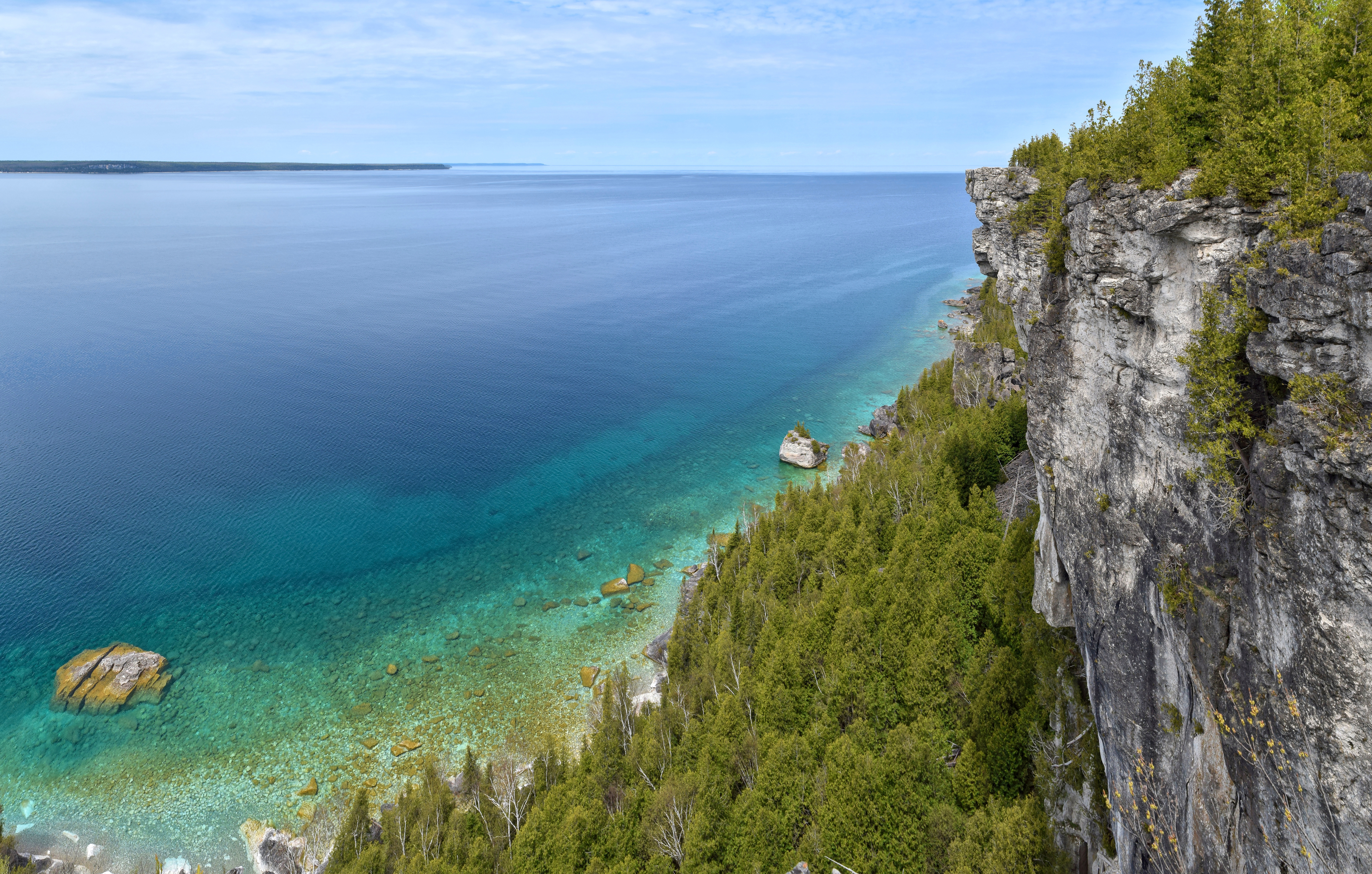
- Georgian Bay viewed from the Bruce Trail

- Location within Southern Ontario
- Interactive map of Lion's Head Provincial Park
- Location: Northern Bruce Peninsula, Ontario, Canada
- Nearest city: Lion's Head, Ontario
- Coordinates: 44°59′49″N 81°12′04″W
- Area: 5.26 km^{2} (2.03 sq mi)
- Established: 1985
- Governing body: Ontario Parks

Lion's Head Provincial Park is a nature reserve in Ontario, Canada, located near the town of Lion's Head on Georgian Bay. The park contains portions of the Niagara Escarpment and is noted for its glacial features, especially potholes. Part of the Bruce Trail runs through the park.

It is a non-operating park without any facilities or services. Permitted activities include hiking and snowshoeing.

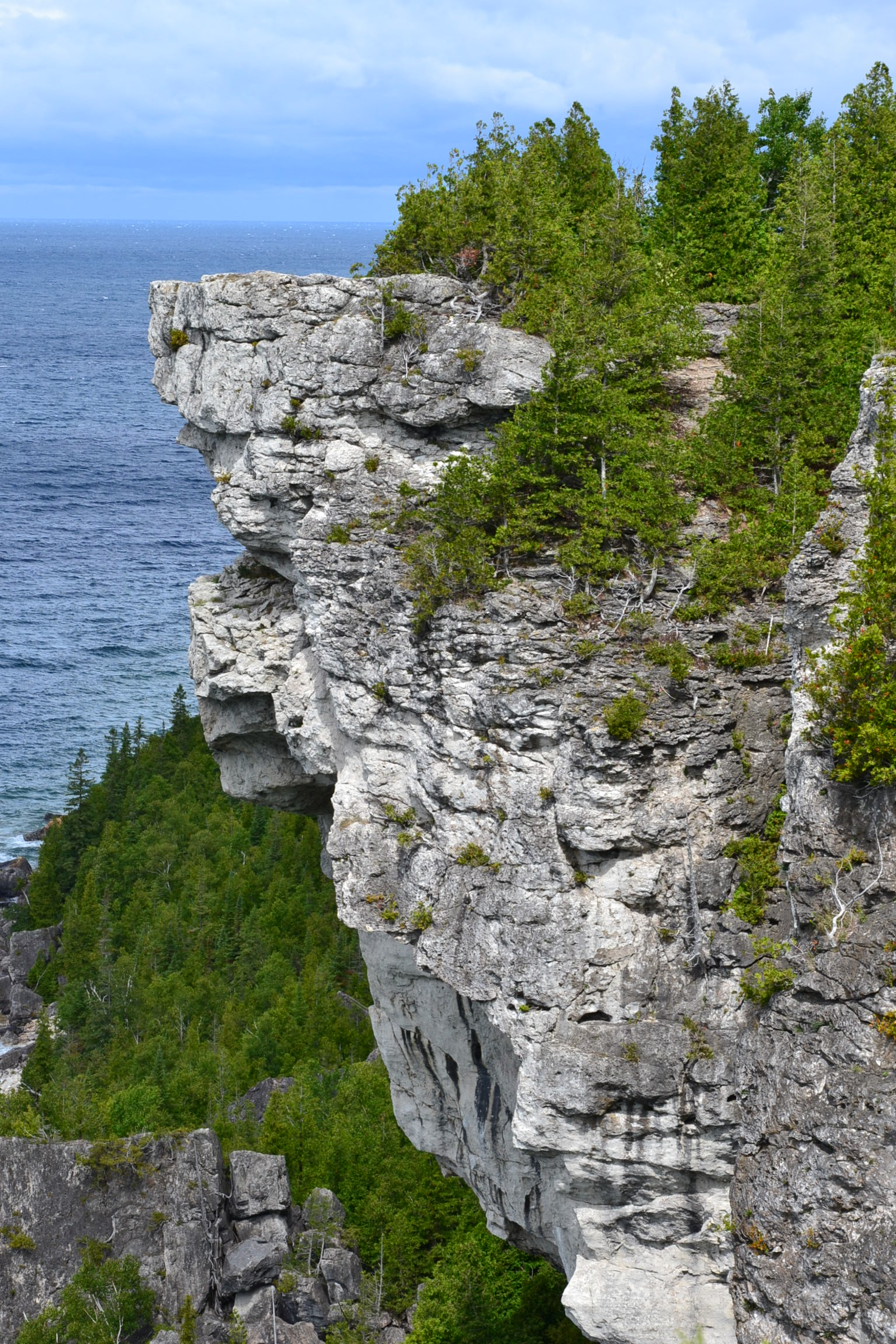
Lion's Head
