= Maple Hill, Bruce County, Ontario =

Maple Hill
- dispersed rural community
- Location within Southern Ontario Location within Canada
- Coordinates: 44°08′41″N 81°04′42″W
- Country: Canada
- Province: Ontario
- County: Bruce County
- Municipality: Brockton
- Elevation: 274 m (899 ft)
- Time zone: UTC−5 (EST)
  - Summer (DST): UTC−4 (EDT)
- GNBC Code: FDKPO

Maple Hill is an dispersed rural community in the township municipality of Brockton, Bruce County, Ontario, Canada.

The settlement is located on Grey/Bruce Road 4, between Walkerton and Hanover. The Saugeen River flows south of Maple Hill, and Ruhl Creek, a tributary of the Saugeen, flows east of the community.

Maple Hill flourished during the mid and late 1800s.

== History ==
The area was known to early travelers as "Maple Hill" because a large strand of maple trees grew there on an elevated piece of the land. The first settlers were all British, and included Captain and Mrs. John J. James, who established a homestead called "Maple Hill". Peter Bartleman, who became a furniture and cabinet maker, settled in Maple Hill in the 1850s.

The Maple Hill School was operating in 1854 with 41 students, and by 1860, Maple Hill had a population of 70. There was a general store, as well Good's Hotel and tavern, which operated from 1860 to 1910, and was used as a stopover for stage coaches. A mill race and saw mill was built on the Saugeen River by William Halls in 1862, and was called "Maple Hill Race and Sawmill", and also "Hall's Mill". The mill later became a flour and grist mill. A post office operated from 1866 to 1923.

In the late 1890s, an electric generator with three waterwheels was installed at a dam on the Saugeen River. Electricity from the dam was used to power nearby communities, as well as the printing press of The Hanover Post.

The Walkerton and Lucknow Railway was completed in 1904, passing through the north of Maple Hill. The line was abandoned in 1984.

Maple Hill declined as nearby Walkerton and Hanover prospered. In 1906, one author wrote that while the early settlement showed promise of developing, "being so near both Walkerton and Hanover, it has given up the struggle".
