= Sauble Beach, Ontario =

Sauble Beach
- Unincorporated settlement
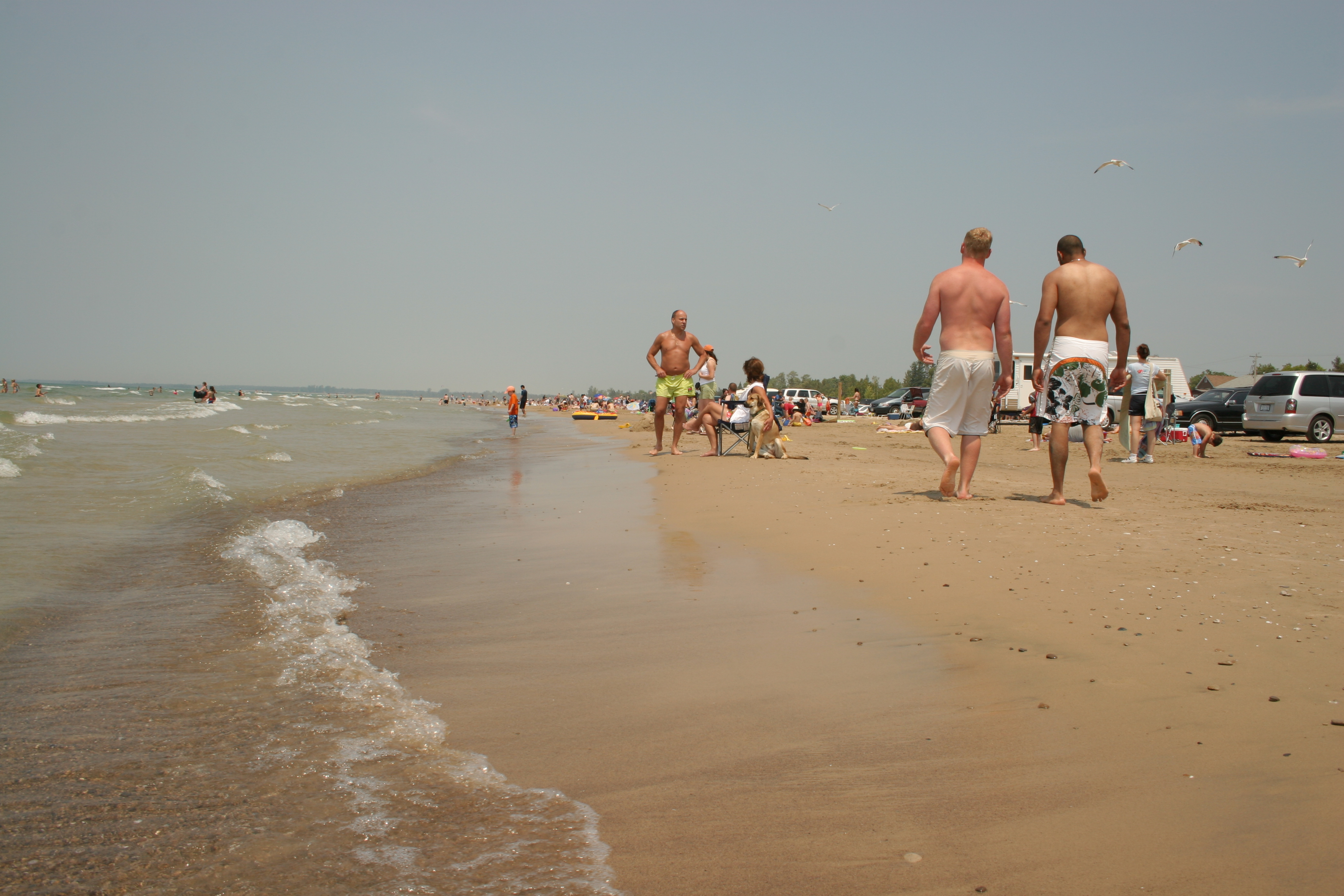
- Sauble Beach
- Etymology: After the French word sable (sand)
- Motto: Live life slow
- Location of Sauble Beach in Ontario
- Coordinates: 44°38′10″N 81°16′09″W
- Country: Canada
- Province: Ontario
- Region: Southwestern Ontario
- County: Bruce
- Elevation: 182 m (597 ft)
- Time zone: UTC-5 (Eastern Time Zone)
  - Summer (DST): UTC-4 (Eastern Time Zone)
- Postal Code FSA: N0H 2G0
- Area code: 519

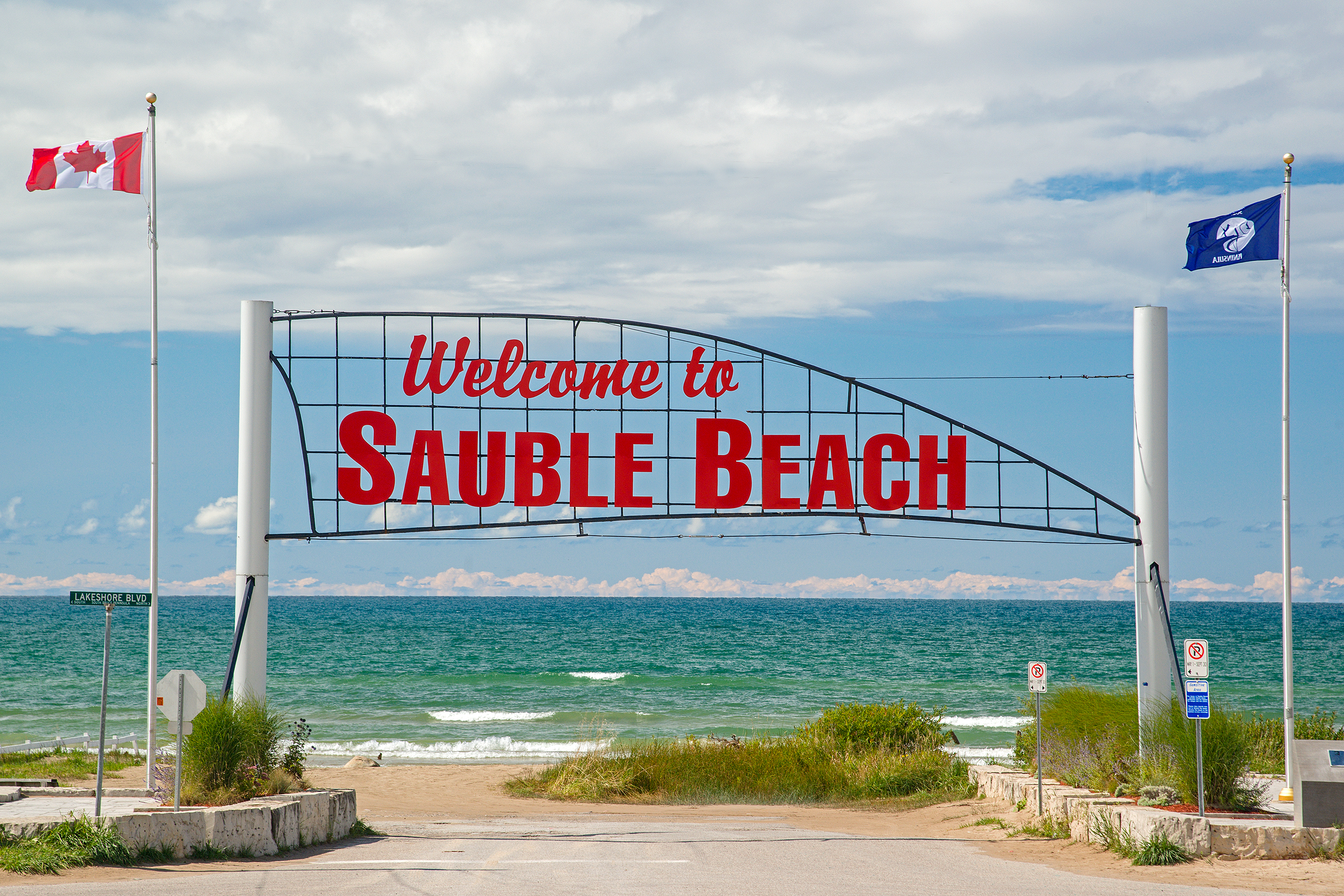
Sign at the entrance to the beach

Sauble Beach is a beach community and unincorporated area in the town of South Bruce Peninsula, Bruce County, in the northern area of southwestern Ontario, Canada. It is on the Bruce Peninsula, along the eastern shore of Lake Huron, on the north edge of the Saugeen First Nation. The beach takes its name from that given by early French explorers to the sandy Sauble River, originally "La Rivière Au Sable" (sand river) also indicating that the river emptied into Lake Huron at a sandy beach. The river was labelled with the French name on maps until 1881, when it became the Sauble River; in early years, a sawmill was built on the river, and later, a hydro electric plant.

== History ==
Long before any settlers arrived, the Anishinabek of the Saugeen Ojibway Nation looking for a shorter and safer route between Lake Huron and Georgian Bay, would cross the peninsula near its base. They would enter near the site of the present-day location of the town of Wiarton and after portaging, would paddle their canoes across the lakes and rivers that almost connect both shores. The route became known as the Rankin Portage and it is suspected that early French explorers used this route to visit the various indigenous communities which existed in the area and to avoid the often-treacherous waters around the tip of the peninsula.

The last portage on the route was around a waterfall near the Lake Huron coast. The French explorers named the river, “La Riviere au Sable”, which translates to “the river to the sand”. This name continued until 1881 when a mapmaker, perhaps inadvertently, marked the river with the name “Sauble.”

The first settler is reported to have been John Eldridge, who built a cottage nearby in 1877. Other settlers followed and the village continued to grow with a boarding house and then a store. In the 1900s, a large sawmill below the falls on the Sauble River employed 40 people. Initially, development was to the south and later to the east of the river. By the early decades of the 1900s, Sauble Beach was attracting visitors because of its gorgeous beaches; this grew as an increasing number of families acquired automobiles.

== Beach and other activities ==
At over eleven kilometres (7 mi) long, Sauble Beach is said to be the second longest freshwater beach in Canada after Wasaga Beach.

A phenomenon of sandbar deposits building out along the Lake Huron shoreline keeps the water at Sauble very shallow and warm. This is one of the very few beaches in Ontario where cars were, until recently, allowed to drive and park on the sand near the water, at least on the side (left of the entrance) that is part of the Saugeen First Nation native lands. In 2019, however, the First Nation also banned beach parking.

Recreational activities include swimming, windsurfing, water-skiing, fishing, golfing, lawn bowling, tennis, street dances, beach volleyball, snowmobiling, cross-country skiing and birding. The town hosts an annual Winterfest. In summer, there are weekly Family Movie Nights, an annual sandcastle building contest, Cruise Nights on Tuesdays, a Sauble Beach Guitar Festival and an 8 km Walk/Run. The Festival of the Classical Guitar has been held since 2007.

The Canadian National (Beach) Volleyball Championships have been held there, and the local Sauble Speedway (with a Hepworth, Ontario address) was on the CASCAR professional racing circuit. The Speedway was purchased by new owners in 2017 and they obtained NASCAR sanctioning in 2018.

A 2023 publication stated that Sauble Beach receives approximately 400,000 tourists annually.

Sauble Beach is the permanent year-round home to approximately 2,000 people. The cottage owners add thousands of seasonal community members, some who stay through the spring to fall time period and others who retreat to Sauble on weekends. In summer, the visitor count increases to over 30,000 on hot weekends and up to 60,000 on a long weekend.

=== Land ownership ===
Cottage owners are split between those who own a property outright and those with cottages on Native lands. A lease relationship exists between the Saugeen First Nation, who also refer to themselves as the "Chippewas of Saugeen", and those who had built seasonal homes on the Native land in the lakeside area between urban Southampton, Ontario and Sauble Beach. There are approximately 1,200 such cottages. Each cottager on Native land pays an annual fee to the First Nation. A lease contract between the cottagers and two Saugeen First Nation Reserves, Chief's Point 28 and Saugeen 29, expired on 30 April 2021.

In the mid-2010s, the Saugeen First Nation successfully reclaimed the land that "runs south from the Sauble Beach sign toward Southampton, 18 kilometres away". The beach area to the south of Main St. in the community is referred to by the band as Sauble Park or South Sauble Beach Park. In addition to the south Sauble Beach area, the Saugeen First Nation claims the rights to another stretch of the public beach, approximately 2 km long, west of Lakeshore Boulevard extending to a point between 1st St. South and 6th St. North. This claim has been in litigation since 1990 when the federal government started an action on behalf of the Saugeen First Nation, stating that the area is part of the Saugeen 29 Reserve. The band also filed its own claim in 1995.

On 4 April 2023, the Ontario Superior Court of Justice ruled that the waterfront area between 1st and 6th is part of the Saugeen reserve, owned by the Saugeen First Nation. The court also ruled that the Government of Canada had abrogated the 1854 Treaty by allowing the beach waterfront to be taken away from the Saugeen. The Town of South Bruce Peninsula council subsequently voted unanimously to appeal the court decision. Later in April 2023, the appeal was filed by the Town and some landowners, requesting that the Court of Appeal set aside the judgment declaring the relevant section of Sauble Beach as First Nation reserve land. In December 2024, the Ontario Court of Appeal upheld the decision ruling that roughly 2.2 kilometres of shoreline land be returned to the First Nation. The town filed an appeal with the Supreme Court of Canada, which was dismissed in August 2025. On July 1, 2025, the Saugeen First Nation changed the "Sauble Beach" sign to read "Saugeen Beach".

== Business and community services ==
Local businesses offer retail and services for hardware, appliance and grocery shopping, restaurants and hotels, fire and police services, daycare and a medical clinic. Fire Station 40 is located at 21 Sauble Falls Parkway. The town is policed by the Ontario Provincial Police whose office is in the same building as the fire station.

The town is home to the June Motel, a boutique motel featured in the 2021 Netflix series Motel Makeover.

== Education ==
There is only one school in town under the Bluewater District School Board. Amabel-Sauble Community School was built in 1995 as an experiment in joint ownership between the board and the Township of Amabel (now part of South Bruce Peninsula); the school provides primary curriculum from Jr. Kindergarten to Grade 8. The closest secondary school is Peninsula Shores District School in Wiarton, Ontario. There are no Roman Catholic schools in town; the closest schools with the Bruce-Grey Catholic District School Board are in Port Elgin, Ontario, and Owen Sound, Ontario. The closest post-secondary institution is Georgian College's Owen Sound campus.

== Politics ==
Sauble Beach is represented by two councillors for Wards 1 and 3 on the Town Council for South Bruce Peninsula in Wiarton. There has been friction between the Town of South Bruce and the Saugeen First Nation because of continuing land claims in the Sauble Beach area. A settlement was mediated in 2014 but was subsequently rejected by South Bruce, leading to a lawsuit against the Town, to be heard in court no earlier than 2018. There has also been conflict regarding environmental protection of sensitive dunes and protected species that are located on the beach. Local residents and members of the Saugeen Ojibway Nation protested plans to alter the dunes in December 2020. One resident asked for a judicial review of the work.

Provincially and federally, the area is part of the riding of Bruce—Grey—Owen Sound.

== Transportation ==
There is no public transit in Sauble Beach and residents are car-dependent.

A few roads serve the area:

- Main Street/Bruce County Road 8
- Lakeshore Boulevard North
- Sauble Falls Parkway/Southampton Parkway

== Bus Transportation ==
- First Student Canada (buses from Owen Sound Ontario)

== Notable people ==
- Lane MacDermid, Retired NHL player
- Kurtis MacDermid, NHL player
