= Southampton, Ontario =

Southampton Saugeen
- Community
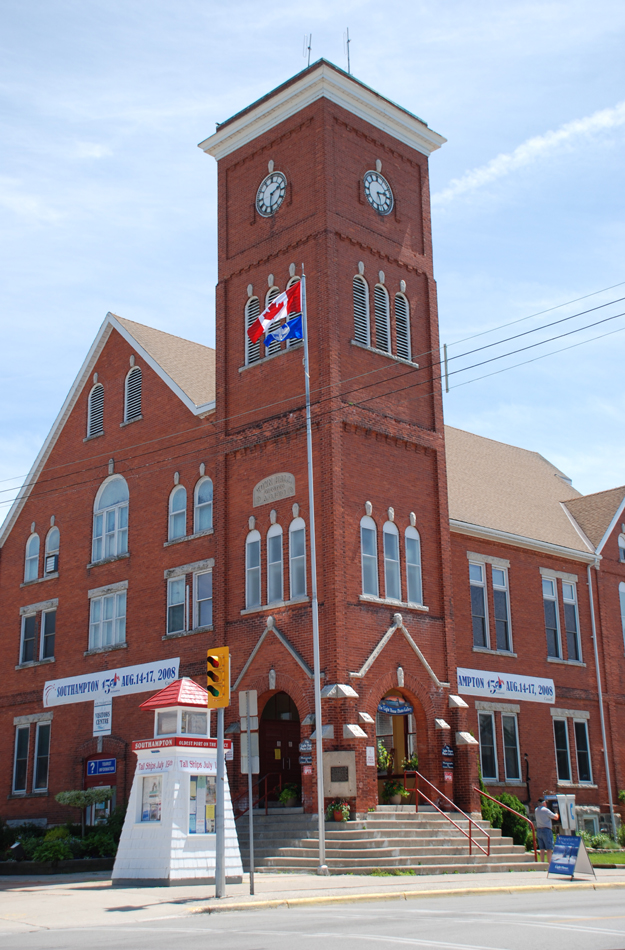
- View of 201 High Street, the traditional Town Hall

- Location in southern Ontario Southampton (Southern Ontario)
- Coordinates: 44°29′44″N 81°22′17″W
- Country: Canada
- Province: Ontario
- County: Bruce
- Town: Saugeen Shores
- Named for: Southampton, England

Government
  - Type: Municipal
- Time zone: UTC-5 (EST)
  - Summer (DST): UTC-4 (EDT)
- Postal code: N0H 2L0
- Area code: 519

Southampton is a community on the shores of Lake Huron in Bruce County, Ontario, Canada. It is close to Port Elgin and is located at the mouth of the Saugeen River in the Saugeen Ojibway Nation Territory. The size of the town is 6.44 square kilometres. The permanent population in 2016 was 3,678, but the summer population is higher since cottagers and campers spend vacation time in the area.

Although the community still has its own post office, and road signs indicating the name Southampton, it is no longer an entity in its own right. In 1998, Port Elgin, Southampton and Township of Saugeen, all along the shores of Lake Huron, were amalgamated to form the Town of Port Elgin-Saugeen-Southampton. On December 17, 1998, the province renamed the community the Town of Saugeen Shores. The primary employment categories are agriculture, small business, tourism, and the Bruce Power nuclear power station 40 km away. Southampton is a bedroom community, a retirement destination, and a tourist destination.

== History ==
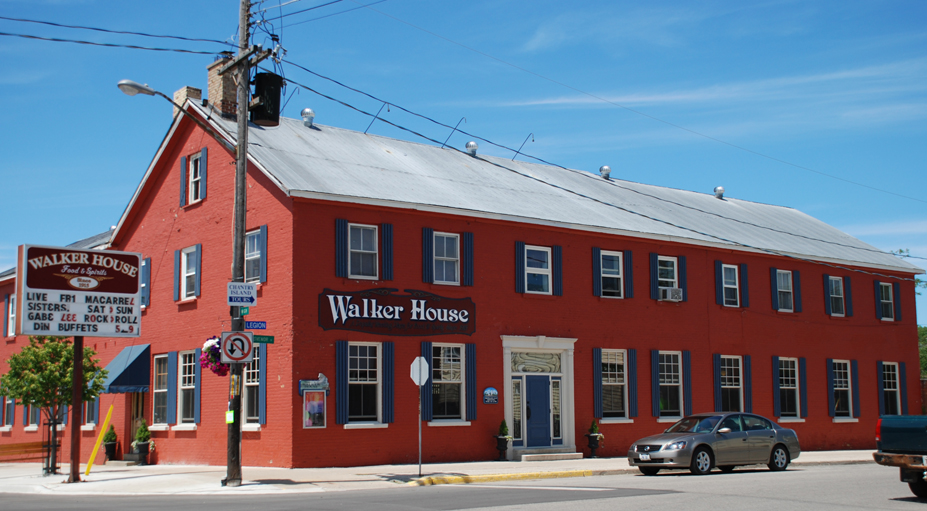
The Walker House, a historic hotel in the village since the 1860s. Now operates as a restaurant.

Long before settlers arrived to the area, Southampton was an important trading area, according to a historic plaque erected in town by the Government of Ontario, titled Fur Trading at Saugeen:

The Anishnabe lived by the mouth of the Saugeen River before Pierre Piché arrived in 1818 to begin fur trading in the region. By 1826, the Hudson's Bay Company established an outpost at Saguingue to compete with independent fur traders like Piché. From La Cloche, its main post on Lake Huron, the Hudson's Bay Company employed First Nations, Métis, French, and British fur traders who largely depended on Anishnabe hunters to supply deer, bear and marten skins. By 1832, the supply of premium furs was exhausted and the company closed its post. Although many Anishnabe gave up hunting and settled in an agricultural village, fur trading continued here until the mid-19th century when Southampton was founded.

The community was originally known as Saugeen by the early residents, by the Canadian Post Office and by Custom House Departments. However, John Price, the Commissioner of the Crown Land Departments labelled the village as Southampton and the name stuck as the town was incorporated, named after Southampton, the English sea port. The first European settlers of the area, around 1848, were Captain John Spence and William Kennedy, who wanted to establish a fishing company.Soon after, more families settled in Saugeen. Notably, the families of Alex MacDonald, John Maclean, Joseph Gilbert, Peter Brown, John Cook, James Lambert and Thomas Lee.

While it proved unsuccessful, Spence became a sailor and Kennedy joined a search for the Arctic explorer, Sir John Franklin. Nevertheless, in 1851 there were at least a dozen families living in the community. In the same year, the Post Office was established, the first and only in Bruce County for several years. Three years later, a Bank of Upper Canada was built.

One of the early Pioneer families that settled in Southampton was that of Joseph Longe. The Longe family were Métis fur traders, who had visited Saugeen as early as the 1820s. The daughter of Joseph Longe Jr, Angelique, better known as "Aunt Annie" is considered the first settler child born in Saugeen, in 1844. She lived in the house her parents built in the 1840s and it now is a local heritage site, still owned by descendants of the Longe family.

In 1846, Smith's Canadian Gazetteer describes Saugeen (Southampton) as little more than a pioneer settlement:

A Settlement of Chippewa Indians, near the month of the Saugeen River, on Lake Huron. ... Sir F. Head, in 1836, obtained a surrender of that vast tract of land ... containing about 1,600,000 acres. ... There are some good log houses, and several comfortable bark shanties. On the hill, in rear of the flats, are several fine fields of corn and potatoes. ... The fishing is very productive, and has attracted the notice of the white people ...

The pioneers of Southampton wanted the village to become the county town or county seat, as the village held the only Crown Land Department and Post Office in the county. However, the town of Kincardine had a larger population and seemed the strongest rival. Furthermore, Southampton did not have enough population to meet the requirements for incorporation. The town petitioned the Legislative Assembly of Ontario and the elective officials passed an exceptional Act of Incorporation on July 24, 1858, to allow the community to be considered for the county seat. Despite their efforts, Walkerton eventually won the battle.

In the mid-1800s, John Denny built a dam, a grist mill, a sawmill, a woolen mill and an inn on the Saugeen River. (Only the latter building remains at 484 Carlisle Street; the current dam was built in the 1970s.)

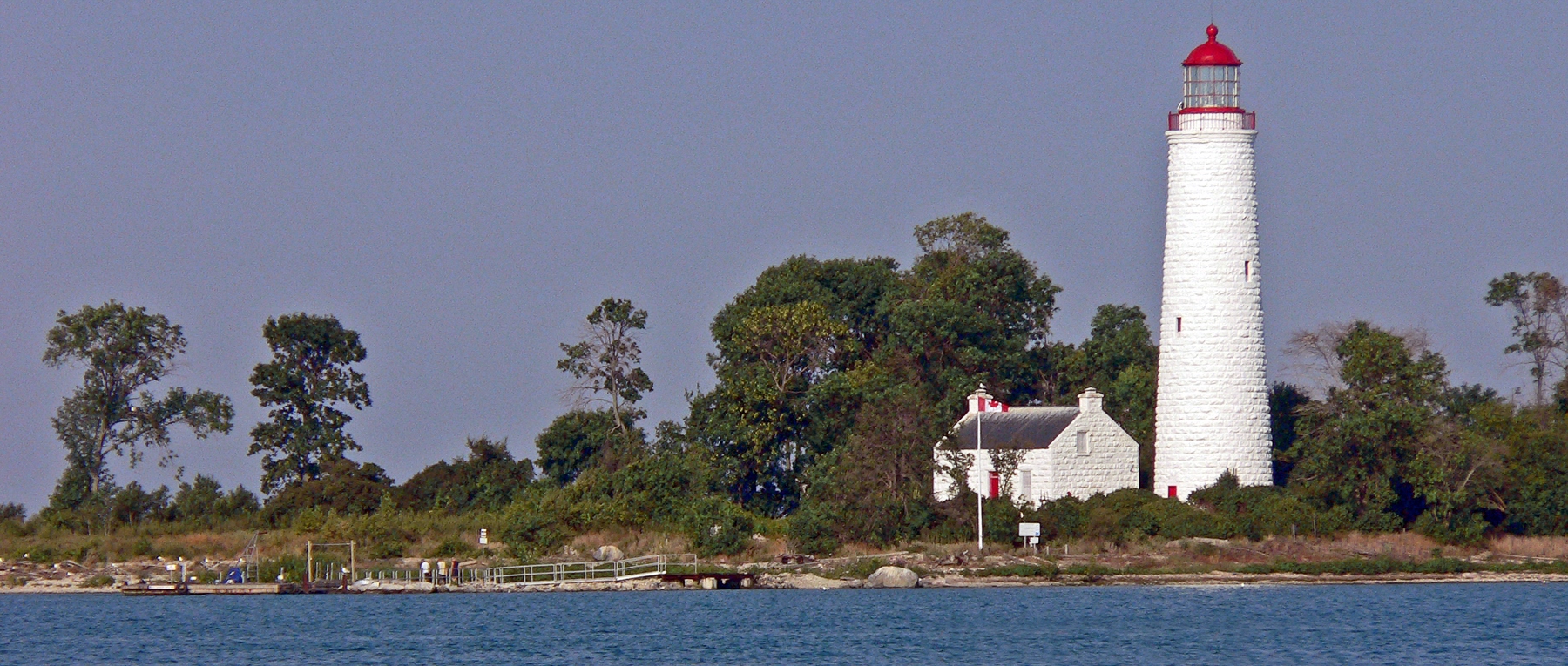
Chantry Island lighthouse and keeper's cottage, from the licensed tour boat

The Chantry Island Lightstation Tower was completed in April 1859, first lit on April 1, with Duncan McGregor Lambert as the first keeper. (The tower and the keeper's home have been extensively renovated and are open for tours, several days a week late May to mid-September, operated only by the Marine Heritage Society. Otherwise, access to the island is prohibited because it is a federal bird sanctuary.)

Records from 1869 indicate that the population had increased to 600. Large amounts of wheat, pork and lumber were being shipped from the village. A bank agency was operating. Good roads were available to other communities. A steam ship made runs to Goderich and Collingwood in summer; stagecoaches operated in winter.

Southampton was incorporated as a town in 1904; at the time, its population was over 2400. The economic base included commercial fishing, warehousing, furniture factories, a tannery and mills.

The town built a hospital in 1947, a post office in 1952, a library in 1956, an arena in 1961 (replaced in 1977) and a new firehall in 1974.

In 2001 a Pallasite meteorite was recovered from Lake Huron close to Southampton. It is believed to have been transported there by glacial action.

In the early 2000s, a historically significant shipwreck was discovered on the beach. Relics of the ship, "General Hunter", can be found in the Bruce County Museum.

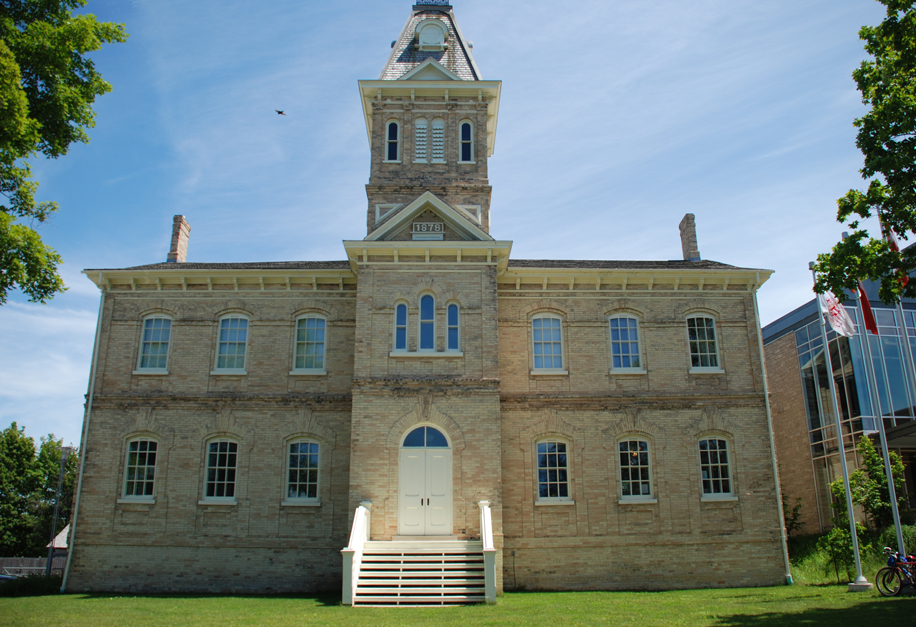
33 Victoria Street, the Old Public School, now part of the Bruce County Museum and Cultural Centre.

=== Railway history ===
The history of Southampton is intertwined with the history of the Wellington, Grey and Bruce Railway (WG&B). The original 1856 charter for what was then known as the Canada North-West Railway called for a line "... from Southampton on Lake Huron to Toronto on Lake Ontario with branch to Owen Sound[.]" The railway was intended to both serve the local area and to provide a through route to the west via the Great Lakes steamer trade. It remained a paper railway for several years, and in 1864 was rechartered as the Wellington, Grey and Bruce, with a key provision allowing it to be taken over by the Great Western Railway, as well as a change of southern terminus to Guelph, to connect to the Great Western's Galt and Guelph Railway. Construction began at Fergus in 1867, and it was formally leased by the Great Western in 1869. The line slowly marched northwest through the late 1860s and early 1870s, reaching Palmerston around 1871. The final stretch of the line, from Harriston to Southampton, was subsidized by the provincial government at $2,000 per mile; it is this final stretch which would later become the CN Southampton Subdivision. The full line to Southampton finally opened on December 7, 1872.

The line would survive repeated mergers over the next fifty years: first, the Great Western's acquisition by the Grand Trunk Railway in 1882, then the consolidation of numerous railways into the Canadian National Railways (CNR) system in the early 1920s. The CNR managed the former Wellington, Grey and Bruce mainline using its division and subdivision system, with the section from Harriston Junction to Southampton being known as the Southampton Subdivision. The CN Stratford-to-Southampton passenger service was converted to Budd Rail Diesel Cars (RDCs) in 1958. The CN passenger timetable for 1960–61 shows a fragmented network of mostly six-day-a-week Railiner services in the area, with six round trips per week between Palmerston and Southampton, requiring a transfer at Palmerston to travel further. Regular passenger service on the line disappeared by 1970.

Around this time, the Douglas Point Spur was constructed, branching off the main Southampton Subdivision line at Port Elgin. It was primarily used for transporting fuel oil from Sarnia to the Bruce Nuclear Generating Station at Douglas Point. CN abandoned the former WG&B mainline in stages throughout the 1980s, beginning with the oldest section running from Fergus to Palmerston; the Southampton Subdivision from Harriston Junction to Southampton was abandoned in 1988, including the Douglas Point Spur.

=== Historical timeline, 1848–1904 ===
Although specific dates vary depending on the source, the following are excerpted from a reliable source, History of the County of Bruce, Ontario, Canada, by Norman Robertson, published in 1906.

- 1848: The first settlement by Capt. John Spence and William Kennedy,
- 1851: First post-office, known as Saugeen, opens.
- 1852: First school opens in the village.
- 1853: First manufacturing industry was a steam sawmill.
- 1857: Denny's grist mill is already operating; he would add a grist mill in 1857, a sawmill in 1859 and a woolen mill in 1865.
- 1857: The village has over 130 houses; the business area is north of High Street, on Huron and Grosvenor Streets. There is a planning mill, a steam sawmill, and a saw and grist mill. There is no large pier but each warehouse has a landing wharf. A large pier would be built in the 1860s, called the Bogus Dock.
- 1858: An Act of incorporation is passed on July 24, making Saugeen a village.
- 1859: The Chantry Island Lightstation Tower is first illuminated on 1 April.
- 1880: A large tannery is opened by Bowman & Zinkan.
- 1885: Commercial fishing has grown, now employing 70 men, manning 18 boats. Steam boats are starting to become common.
- 1886: A fire in November destroys over fifty buildings.
- 1889 or 1890: Post office is renamed Southampton.
- 1895: As a port of entry, Saugeen is changed to Southampton. The Knechtel family begins opening large furniture factories.
- 1897: Saugeen Electric Light and Power Company begins providing electricity from Denny's dam.
- 1889: First bridge (430 feet long) at the mouth of the Saugeen River is completed.
- 1903: A smaller lighthouse, with front and back "range" lights and foghorn, opens at the harbour at the mouth of the river.
- 1904: Southampton is incorporated a town on December 26; the population is over 2400. Alexander Emerson Belcher is the first mayor.

== Climate ==
Climate data for Southampton
Month	Jan	Feb	Mar	Apr	May	Jun	Jul	Aug	Sep	Oct	Nov	Dec	Year
Record high °C (°F)	18.9 (66.0)	15.0 (59.0)	25.6 (78.1)	27.8 (82.0)	32.2 (90.0)	34.4 (93.9)	35.6 (96.1)	35.6 (96.1)	35.0 (95.0)	30.0 (86.0)	25.0 (77.0)	18.3 (64.9)	35.6 (96.1)
Mean daily maximum °C (°F)	−2.7 (27.1)	−2.6 (27.3)	2.5 (36.5)	9.2 (48.6)	15.6 (60.1)	20.7 (69.3)	22.8 (73.0)	22.3 (72.1)	18.8 (65.8)	13.3 (55.9)	6.7 (44.1)	0.3 (32.5)	10.6 (51.1)
Daily mean °C (°F)	−6.3 (20.7)	−6.6 (20.1)	−1.5 (29.3)	5.0 (41.0)	10.8 (51.4)	15.8 (60.4)	18.7 (65.7)	18.4 (65.1)	15.1 (59.2)	9.7 (49.5)	3.8 (38.8)	−2.7 (27.1)	6.7 (44.1)
Mean daily minimum °C (°F)	−10 (14)	−10.8 (12.6)	−5.6 (21.9)	0.7 (33.3)	5.9 (42.6)	10.9 (51.6)	14.5 (58.1)	14.6 (58.3)	11.2 (52.2)	6.0 (42.8)	0.8 (33.4)	−5.9 (21.4)	2.7 (36.9)
Record low °C (°F)	−32.8 (−27.0)	−37.2 (−35.0)	−29.4 (−20.9)	−20 (−4)	−5.6 (21.9)	−1.1 (30.0)	2.8 (37.0)	1.1 (34.0)	−3.3 (26.1)	−11.1 (12.0)	−19.4 (−2.9)	−27.2 (−17.0)	−37.2 (−35.0)
Average precipitation mm (inches)	87.9 (3.46)	50.1 (1.97)	46.4 (1.83)	53.2 (2.09)	59.1 (2.33)	70.6 (2.78)	66.5 (2.62)	82.8 (3.26)	85.9 (3.38)	71.2 (2.80)	71.8 (2.83)	83.1 (3.27)	828.4 (32.61)
Average rainfall mm (inches)	12.5 (0.49)	13.7 (0.54)	28.2 (1.11)	50.0 (1.97)	58.9 (2.32)	70.6 (2.78)	66.5 (2.62)	82.8 (3.26)	85.9 (3.38)	70.6 (2.78)	57.1 (2.25)	31.5 (1.24)	628.2 (24.73)
Average snowfall cm (inches)	75.3 (29.6)	36.4 (14.3)	17.6 (6.9)	3.3 (1.3)	0.2 (0.1)	0 (0)	0 (0)	0 (0)	0 (0)	4.2 (1.7)	14.7 (5.8)	51.5 (20.3)	203.2 (80.0)
Average precipitation days (≥ 0.2 mm)	16	12	9	10	10	11	8	10	12	14	14	15	140
Average rainy days (≥ 0.2 mm)	2	2	5	9	10	11	8	10	12	13	11	5	99
Average snowy days (≥ 0.2 cm)	14	10	4	1	0	0	0	0	0	1	3	11	44
Source: Environment Canada

== Economy ==
Tourism is the majority source of revenue for the economy; however, the Bruce Nuclear plant in nearby Tiverton, Ontario, is a major employer. In 2016, the Bruce Nuclear Generating Station started a $13 billion refurbishment program which will provide employment for many residents and maintain demand for other services. According to Bruce Power, this multi-year plan "will generate between 1,500 and 2,500 jobs on site annually – and 18,000 across Ontario directly and indirectly – while injecting up to $4 billion annually into Ontario’s economy".

== Tourism ==
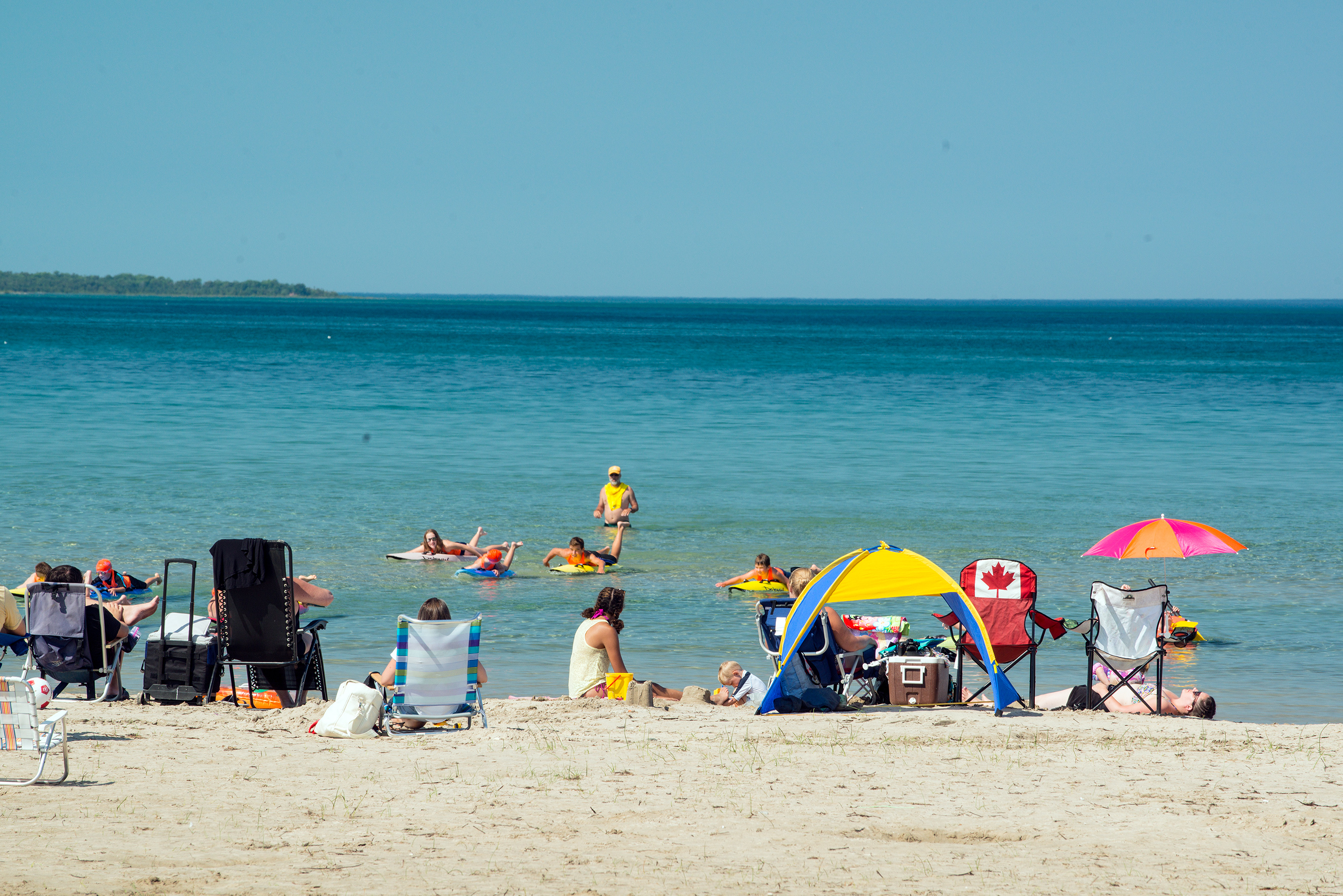
Beach at Southampton, Ontario

This area of the Lake Huron shore is known for its long sand beaches (the Main Beach is approximately 4 km long) as well as the sunsets since the beach area faces to the west.

Every Friday night in from mid June to early September, a bagpiper plays under the "Big Flag" at the foot of High Street on Friday evenings, a tradition which started in the late 1990s. Canada Day is a highly celebrated occasion, where hundreds of cottagers and locals alike gather on Southampton Beach to watch the fireworks lit off the base of the "Big Flag". During the months of July and August there are "Ghost Walks" available every Tuesday night. These commence at sunset at the foot of High St at the "Big Flag". During the summer and early autumn, the beaches are full of people who have come to see the colourful sunsets lighting up the sky over the lake.

Near the town, Southampton, a summer destination, is close to Chantry Island, Port Elgin, Saugeen First Nation which holds a PowWow in August each year, and Sauble Beach. Every Thursday evening from early June to late August, a Cruise Nite is held; the classic cars park downtown on High St. near the lake shore. Concerts are held at Fairy Lake at least one evening per week in summer.

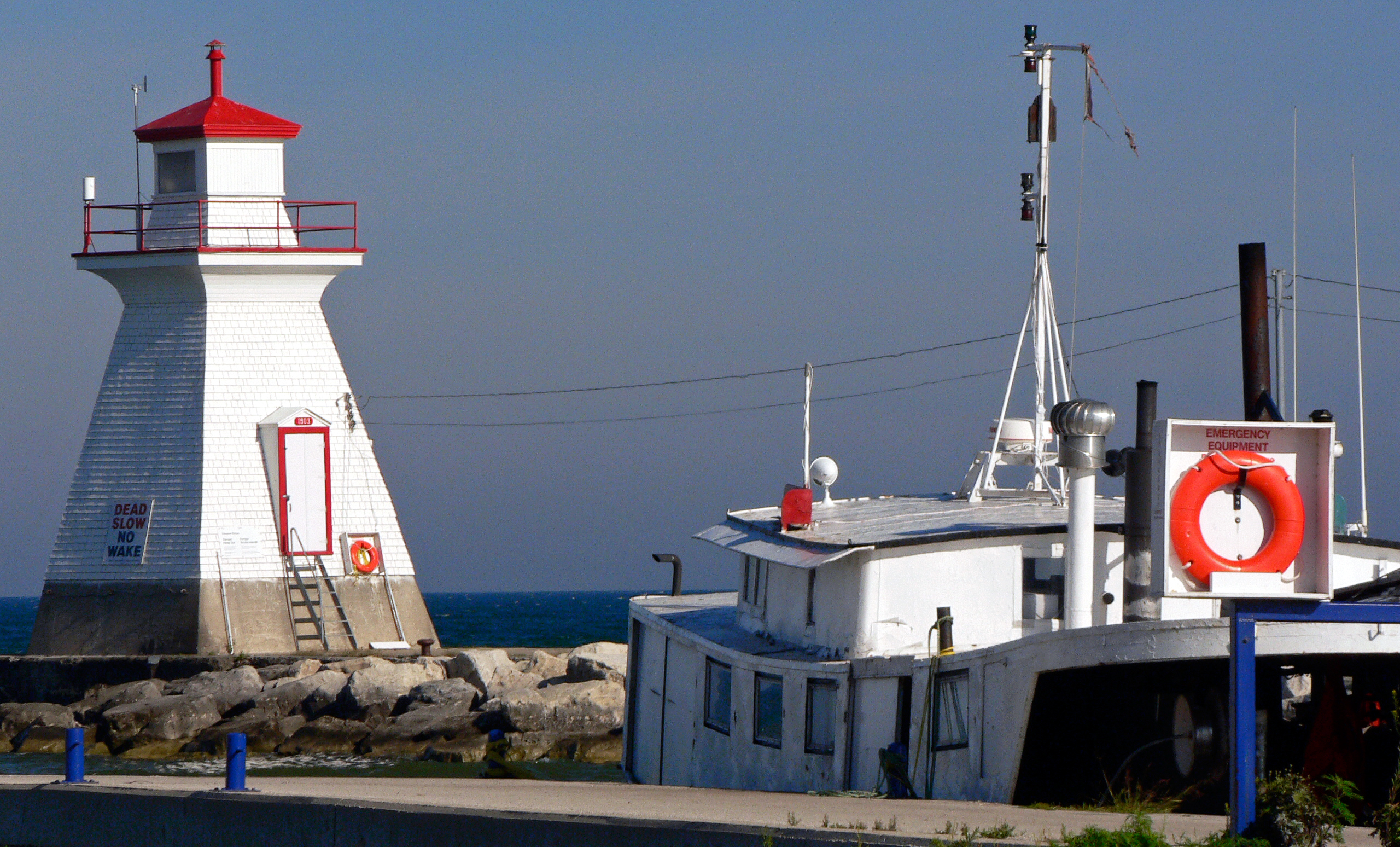
Harbour Range light, one of the first designated under the Heritage Lighthouse Protection Act

Fishing is common in this area in the nearby Saugeen River, at Denny's Dam and in Lake Huron. The Chantry Chinook Classic Salmon Derby is held each summer, usually from about mid-July to the second week of August. The contest's weigh stations are located in Saugeen Shores and in two other Lake Huron communities, Kincardine, Ontario, and Wiarton, Ontario.

The Bruce County Museum & Cultural Centre provides displays about local history and in summer especially, offers adult and children's programming and special events. These are listed in the Shoreline Beacon community newspaper. The museum has been enlarged over the years and was recently renovated. In addition to a settlers cabin, the facility houses numerous historic artifacts from the area, genealogical records, county newspapers, photographs, and municipal documents.

The Chantry Island Lightstation Tower was built in 1859; the tower, keeper's cottage, boat house and dock have been fully restored. The island is a federal Migratory Bird Sanctuary and access is prohibited except with the single licensed tour operator. From late-May to mid-September, tours of the lightstation facilities are available several times a week. They leave on the Marine Heritage Society's boat from the ticket office by the fishing boat docks at the harbour.

Three other local lighthouses have been designated under the Heritage Lighthouse Protection Act: McNab Point and both the Front and Rear Range lights at the River Front.

=== Cottages ===
There are numerous cottage owners in and around Southampton. Cottage owners are uniquely split between those who own their land outright and those with cottages located on Native lands. A lease relationship exists between the Saugeen First Nation ("Chippewas of Saugeen") and cottagers who have built seasonal homes on Native land in the lakeside area between urban Southampton and Sauble Beach; there are approximately 1,200 such cottages. Each cottager on such land pays an annual lease fee to the First Nation for use of the land. The current (mid-2019) lease contract between the cottagers and two Saugeen First Nation Reserves, Chief's Point 28 and Saugeen 29, is in effect until 30 April 2021.

== Transportation ==
Highway 21 passes through Southampton, following its lakeshore route to the south and veering over land to the north on its way to Owen Sound. Bruce County Road 3 intersects with it just south of Southampton, near Port Elgin. Bruce County Road 13 continues following the lakeshore north from Southampton.

== Bus Transportation ==
- First Student Canada (buses from Kincardine/Port Elgin, Ontario)
- Ross Young Bus Lines (buses from Tiverton, Ontario) (serving the Bruce County area)

=== Trails ===
The Saugeen Rail Trail is a 25-kilometre (16 mi) long rail trail connecting Southampton and Port Elgin. It also connects to the larger Bruce County Rail Trail, It follows the route of the former Wellington, Grey and Bruce Railway line (later the CN Southampton Subdivision) which was abandoned in 1988. After the railways ceased to service the area, the tracks were removed and the beds were vacant and overgrown. A group of volunteers founded the Saugeen RailTrail Association in 1990, and convinced Port Elgin, Southampton and Saugeen Township to acquire sections of the then-unused rail bed. Over the years, the bed has been developed as trails for walking and cycling. The trail also connects to the 80 kilometre long Bruce County Trail Network which leads to towns such as Paisley, Walkerton, Mildmay and Kincardine. The trailhead can be accessed at River Street in Port Elgin, a few blocks north of the town centre and east of Hwy 21. There are other access points in both towns, some with parking. The trail is not groomed for cross-country skiing during the winter but is used frequently for that purpose.

The Great Lakes Waterfront Trail also runs through Southampton, following a more coastal route and a mix of on-road and off-road rights of way. South of Port Elgin, it connects to MacGregor Point Provincial Park.

== Health care ==
The Town of Saugeen Shores' hospital is in Southampton, Saugeen Memorial. Many physicians' practices are at the Saugeen Shores Medical Building. The hospital is part of the Bright Shores Health System's network of hospitals in northern Bruce and in Grey County. Hospital facilities include 16 beds, a 24-hour emergency department, surgery, acute medical care, outpatient services, and day surgery including ear, nose and throat surgery.

== Media ==
- Cable television is provided by Eastlink TV and Bruce Telecom
- CFPS-FM 97.9 "The Bruce" - rock music
- CIYN-FM-2 90.9 "Shoreline Classics" - classic rock music
- CKNX-FM 101.7 "The One" - local, regional and national news and adult contemporary music
- CIBU-FM 94.5 "The Bull" - local, regional and national news and classic rock music

== See also ==
- Bruce County
- List of townships in Ontario
- Heritage Lighthouse Protection Act
