= South Bruce Peninsula =

- Town (lower-tier)
- Town of South Bruce Peninsula
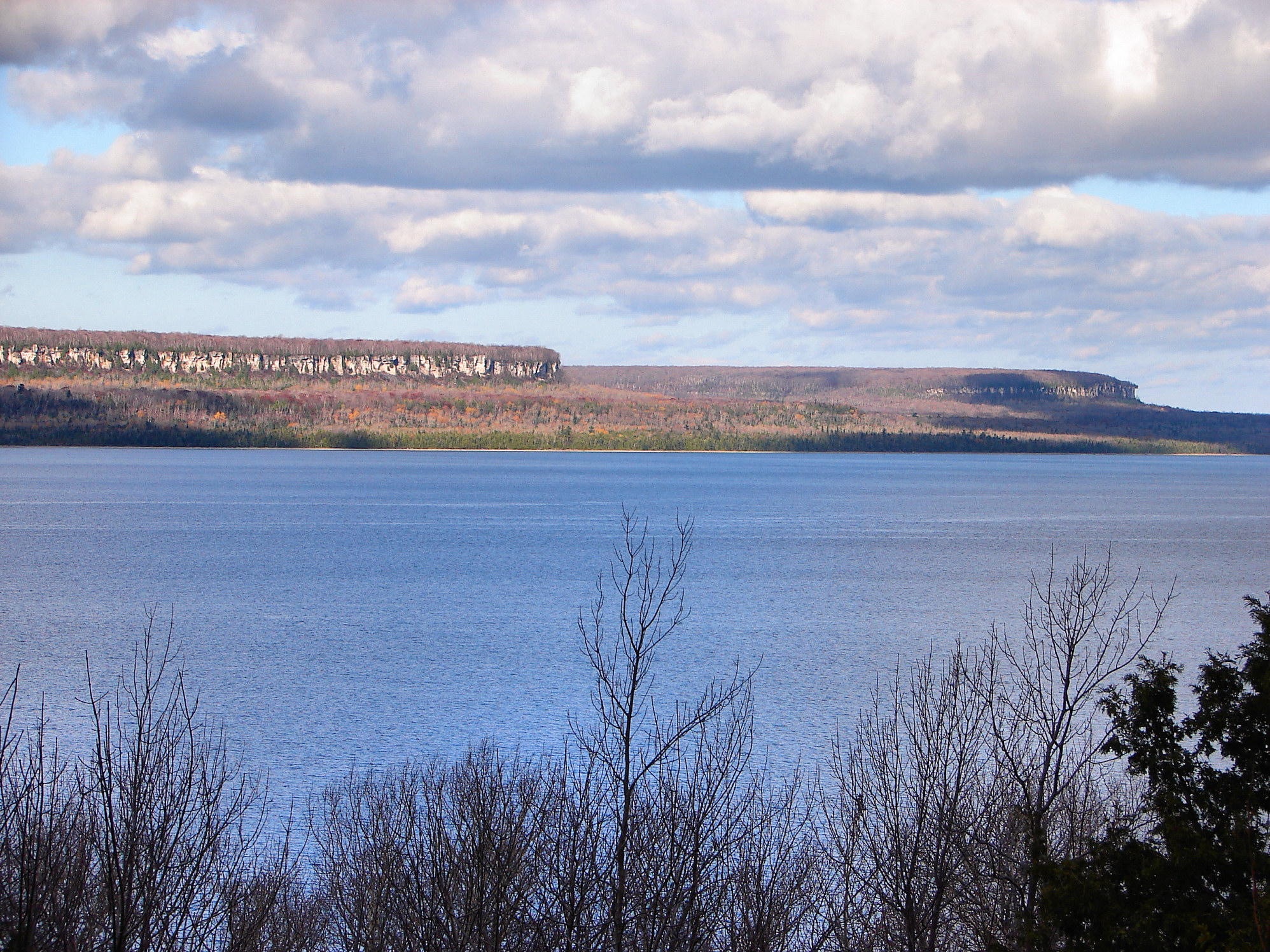
- The Malcolm Bluff near Purple Valley, as seen across Colpoys Bay

- Location within Bruce County Location within Southern Ontario
- Coordinates: 44°44′N 81°12′W
- Country: Canada
- Province: Ontario
- County: Bruce
- Formed: January 1, 1999

Government
  - Mayor: Jay Kirkland
  - Deputy Mayor: Caleb Hull
  - Councillors: Terry Bell, Paul Deacon, Kathy Durst
  - Federal riding: Bruce—Grey—Owen Sound
  - Prov. riding: Bruce—Grey—Owen Sound

Area
  - Land: 530.61 km^{2} (204.87 sq mi)

Population (2021)
  - Total: 9,137
  - Density: 17.2/km^{2} (45/sq mi)
- Time zone: UTC-5 (EST)
  - Summer (DST): UTC-4 (EDT)
- Postal Code: N0H
- Area codes: 519 and 226
- Website: www.southbrucepeninsula.com

South Bruce Peninsula is not to be confused with the Municipality of South Bruce, Ontario

South Bruce Peninsula is a town at the base of the Bruce Peninsula of Ontario, Canada, in Bruce County between Lake Huron and Georgian Bay. It was formed on January 1, 1999, when the town of Wiarton, the village of Hepworth, and the townships of Albemarle and Amabel were amalgamated. The new municipality was created to provide necessary political representation, administrative support, and necessary municipal services on behalf of the residents.

Tourism, particularly cottage rental and providing services to visitors, is the major industry in the area. Many cottages are found along Sauble Beach (North and South), now recognized as Saugeen Beach.

== Communities ==
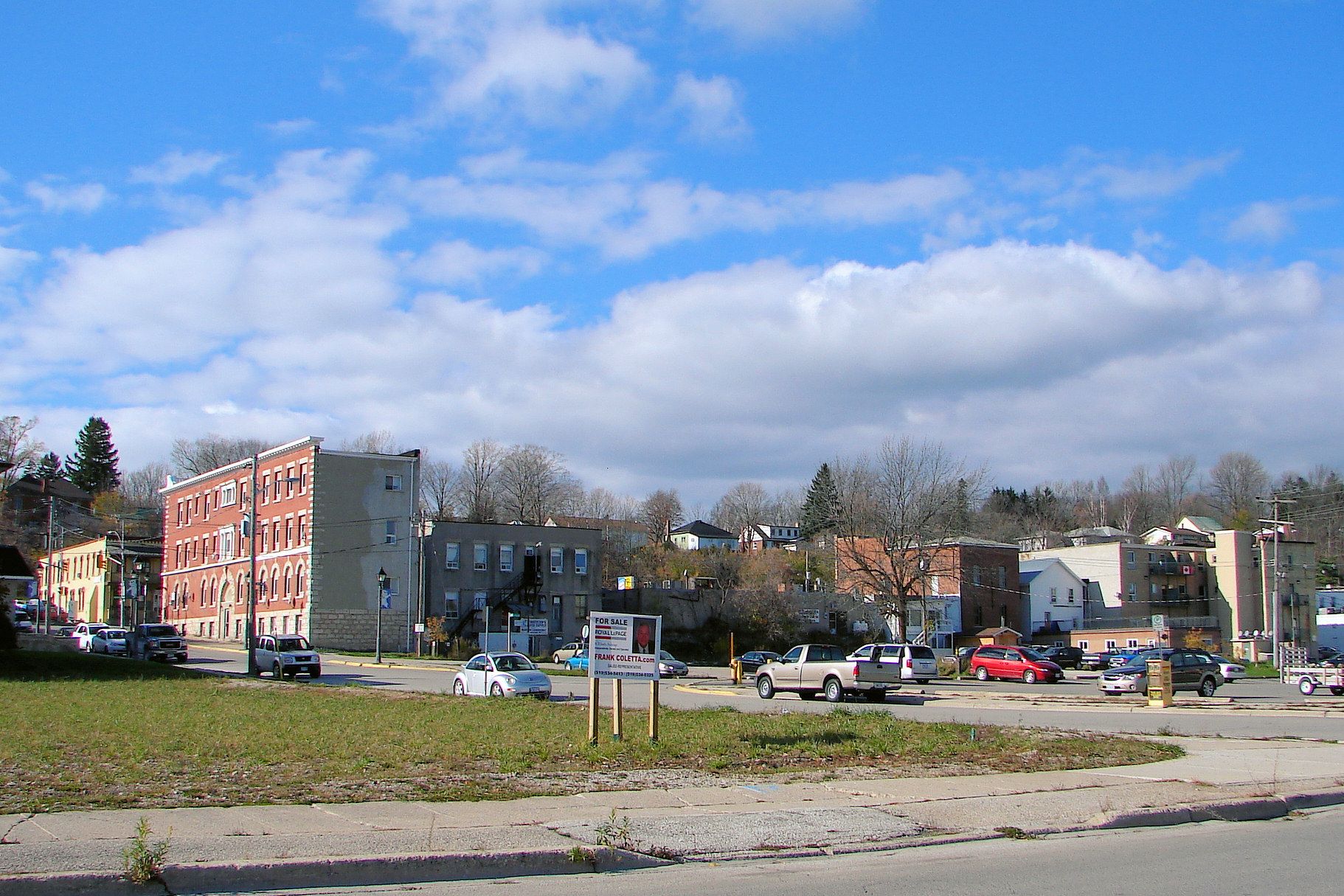
Wiarton

The town comprises a number of villages and larger communities. These include the following:

- Albemarle Ward: Adamsville, Colpoys Bay, Hope Bay, Howdenvale, Mar, Purple Valley, Red Bay; McIver
- Amabel Ward: Allenford, Clavering, Elsinore, Hepworth, Oliphant, Park Head, Saugeen Beach, Wiarton, French Bay, Sauble Beach South, Sauble Falls, Skipness, Tolmie

The administrative centre of the region is found in Wiarton.

== Demographics ==
In the 2021 Census of Population conducted by Statistics Canada, South Bruce Peninsula had a population of 9,137 living in 4,148 of its 7,093 total private dwellings, a change of 8.6% from its 2016 population of 8,416. With a land area of 530.61 km^{2} (204.87 sq mi), it had a population density of 17.2/km^{2} (44.6/sq mi) in 2021.

Canada census – South Bruce Peninsula community profile

	2021	2016	2011
Population	9,137 (+8.6% from 2016)	8,416 (0.0% from 2011)	8,413 (0.0% from 2006)
Land area	530.61 km^{2} (204.87 sq mi)	532.29 km^{2} (205.52 sq mi)	538.32 km^{2} (207.85 sq mi)
Population density	17.2/km^{2} (45/sq mi)	15.8/km^{2} (41/sq mi)	15.6/km^{2} (40/sq mi)
Median age	56.8 (M: 56.0, F: 57.6)	54.5 (M: 53.8, F: 55.1)	51.9 (M: 51.2, F: 52.7)
Private dwellings	7,093 (total) 4,148 (occupied)	6,945 (total)	6,959 (total)
Median household income	$71,500	$57,766

References: 2021 2016 2011

Historical census populations – South Bruce Peninsula
Year	Pop.	±%
2001	8,090	—
2006	8,415	+4.0%
2011	8,413	−0.0%
2016	8,416	+0.0%
2021	9,137	+8.6%
Source: Statistics Canada

Population trend prior to amalgamation:

- Population total in 1996: 8,004
  - Albemarle (township): 1,217
  - Amabel (township): 3,917
  - Hepworth (village): 470
  - Wiarton (town): 2,400
- Population in 1991:
  - Albemarle (township): 1,140
  - Amabel (township): 3,815
  - Hepworth (village): 453
  - Wiarton (town): 2,326

Mother tongue (2021):

- English as first language: 94.7%
- French as first language: 0.9%
- English and French as first language: 0.2%
- Other as first language: 3.8%

== Attractions ==
The main tourist attractions for the area are Saugeen Beach (formerly Sauble Beach), Wiarton Willie (Groundhog Day), and fishing locations on Lake Huron and Georgian Bay.

The region has many annual festivals such as the Wiarton Willie Festival, held each February; the William Wilfred Campbell Poetry & Arts Festival in June; the Wiarton Rotary Village Fair, held on Civic Holiday weekend each August; the Oliphant Regatta, held each summer; Sauble Sandfest, held each August; and the Wiarton Fall Fair, held each September.

The Bruce Trail, the oldest and longest marked hiking trail in Canada, with over 440 km of side trails, runs up the eastern side of the Bruce Peninsula.

Isaac Lake Management area is north of Wiarton, Ontario.

== Government ==
An elected mayor, deputy major and three councilors provide the municipal government, guided by provincial legislation. A number of Committees and local Boards assist Council. "Council establishes policies and budgets for programs and services delivered by the Town of South Bruce Peninsula." The Legislative Services Department includes the Clerk's Division, By-Law Enforcement and Animal Control, and the Building Division.

== Town services ==
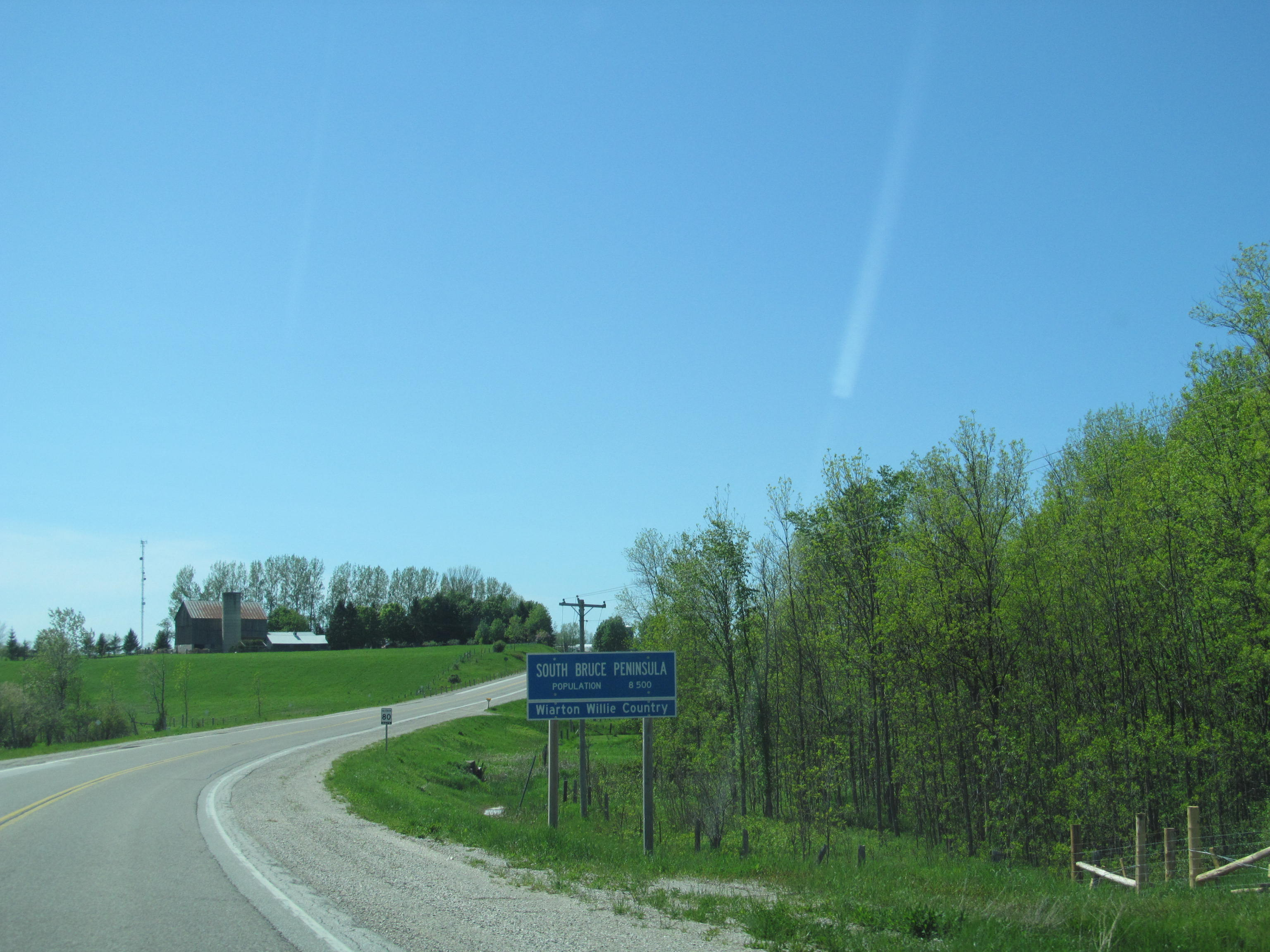
Entering South Bruce Peninsula from Highway 21

The Parks & Recreation Department services parks, playgrounds, athletic fields, ball diamonds, arena, aquatic programs and various programs. The town has Fire stations but policing is provided by the Ontario Provincial Police from the Wiarton Detachment.

There is one hospital in the town: Wiarton Hospital with emergency and ambulance services, with 22 beds. Nearby, though outside the town, is the Grey-Bruce Regional Health Centre in Owen Sound. The latter is larger and is the regional referral centre for Grey and Bruce counties with over 50 specialists on staff.

== Land ownership, Sauble Beach ==
There has been some friction between the Town and the Saugeen First Nation because of continuing land claims in the Sauble Beach area. A settlement was mediated in 2014 but was subsequently rejected by South Bruce, leading to a lawsuit against the Town, to be heard in court no earlier than 2018.

Sauble Beach is the permanent year-round home to approximately 2,000 people. The cottage owners add thousands of seasonal community members. Cottage owners are uniquely split between those who own property outright and those with cottages on Native lands. (Years earlier, the Saugeen First Nation had successfully reclaimed the land that "runs south from the Sauble Beach sign toward Southampton, 18 kilometres away", according to one news report.) A lease relationship exists between the Saugeen First Nation, the "Chippewas of Saugeen", and cottagers who built seasonal homes on leased land in the a lakeside area between urban Southampton, Ontario and Sauble Beach. They pay an annual fee to the Saugeen First Nation. The current land lease agreement between the cottagers and the Saugeen First Nation remains in effect until April 30, 2021.

Some years ago, the Saugeen First Nation successfully reclaimed the land that "runs south from the Sauble Beach sign toward Southampton, 18 kilometres away", according to one news report. The beach area to the south of Main St. in the community is referred to by the band as Sauble Park or South Sauble Beach Park. In addition to the south Sauble Beach, Ontario area, the Saugeen First Nation claims the rights to another stretch of the public beach, approximately 2 km long, west of Lakeshore Boulevard extending to a point between 1st St. South and 6th St. North. This claim has been in litigation since 1990 when the federal government started an action on behalf of the Saugeen First Nation, stating that the area is part of the Saugeen 29 Reserve. The band also filed its own claim in 1995.

In 2019, the Saugeen First Nation banned the driving and parking of vehicles on their South Sauble beach; the town had done so previously on their public beach.

In April 2023, the court ruled that the north part of the beach has been a part of the Reserve. The beach is now recognized at Saugeen Beach, with the Saugeen First Nations managing the beach.

== Notable people ==
- Laura Emma Jamieson, pacifist and feminist

== See also ==
- List of townships in Ontario
