= Wiarton Hospital =

Public hospital in Ontario, Canada

- Bright Shores Health System

Geography
- Location: 369 Mary Street; Wiarton, Ontario; N0H 2T0

Organisation
- Care system: Medicare
- Type: Rural

Services
- Emergency department: Yes
- Beds: 22

History
- Founded: 1949

Links
- Website: www.gbhs.on.ca

Wiarton Hospital (previously the Bruce Peninsula and District Red Cross Memorial Hospital) is 22-bed rural hospital in Wiarton, Ontario that was opened by the Canadian Red Cross in 1949. The hospital replaced the Wiarton Red Cross Outpost.

The original structure was replaced in 1994, and is currently operated by Bright Shores Health System.

== History and background ==
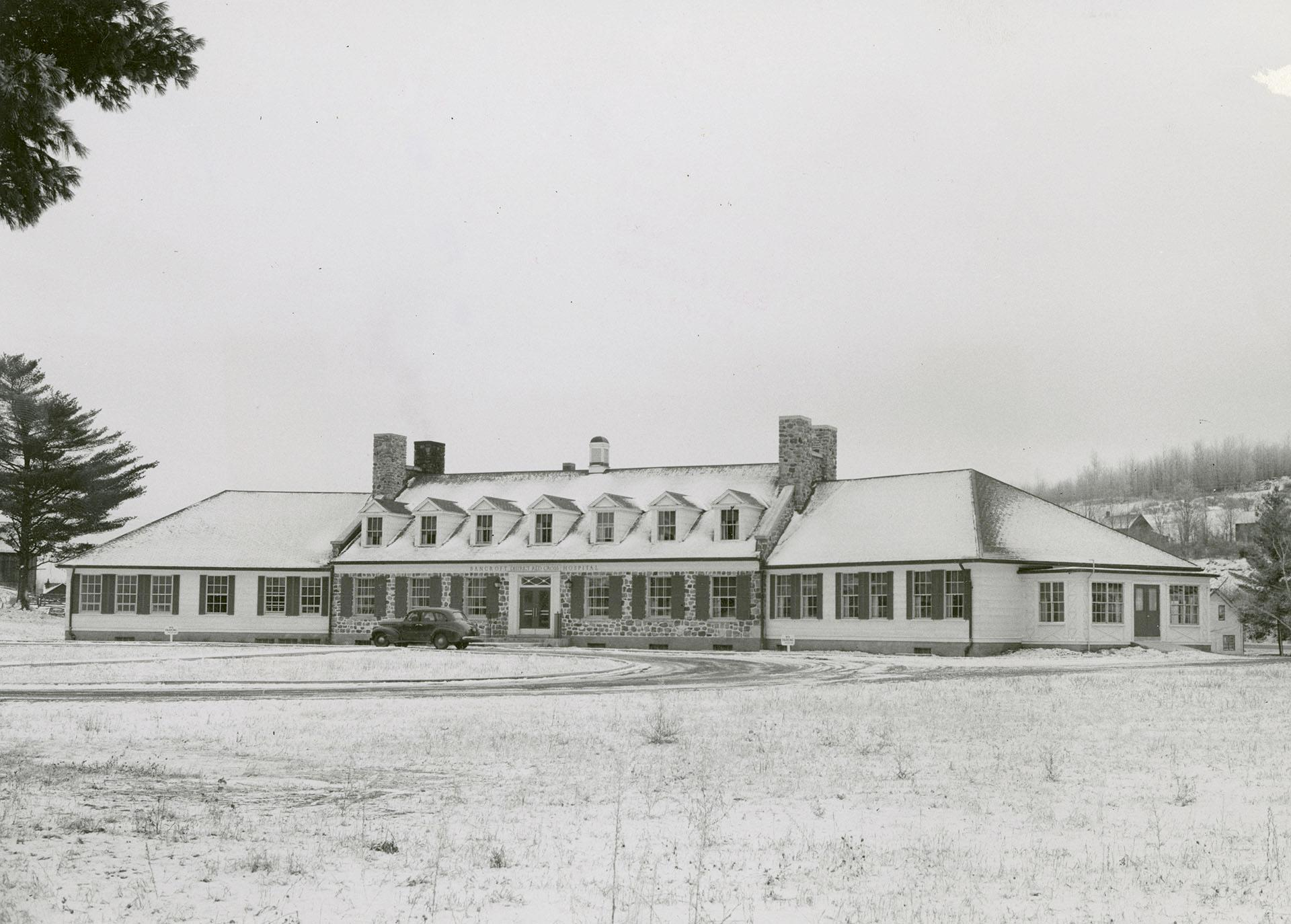
Bancroft Hospital, 1951

In the aftermath of World War I, the Canadian Red Cross began health programs in Ontario, with the initial activities starting in 1922 with the opening of the Wilberforce Red Cross Outpost, and the Wiarton Red Cross Outpost opening subsequent to that. After the opening of the health post, the Wiarton community petitioned the Red Cross directors to upgrade it into a full hospital in 1924, 1936, and 1943 but the directors decline, worried that opening a hospital would upset local private hospitals. In 1944, the community started a fourth lobbying campaign for a hospital; the campaign took five years, but was successful with the Red Cross and the Ontario provincial government funding the hospital's construction.

The construction of Wiarton hospital was departure from the Red Cross' typical approach, until 1949 they had only ever provided health services in existing structures. The hospital opened on the 6th October 1949, formally called the Bruce Peninsula and District Red Cross Memorial Hospital with the official opening undertaken by local politician Russell Temple Kelley.

In 1967 the hospital was run by a ten-person board. As of 1974, the it was governed by a sixteen-person board, which included Irene Akiwenzie, Ab Cordingly, Dan Davidson, Harvey Forbes, Bernice Limpert, Irene McLaughlin, Ken McNay M.D., Jim Rae, Marie Simmie, Carl H. Whicher and Peter Walker, who was the chief executive officer at the time.

The design of Wiarton Hospital was replicated by the Red Cross in Bancroft, Burk's Falls and Nipigon, and a larger 27-bed hospital was opened in Huntsville.

== Transfer from Red Cross to municipal management ==
Challenges with operating costs, and nurse recruitment were causing major difficulties for the Red Cross to continue operating hospitals in Ontario. As a result, the Central Committee of the Red Cross directed the Ontario division to cease hospital operations. On the 1 January 1952, the Red Cross ended their relationship with the hospital and transferred ownership to the local authorities.

In 1982, the Earl R. Harris Hospital in Lion's Head merged into Wiarton Hospital.

== Rebuild ==
The original hospital structure has been demolished and was replaced with a new 22-bed hospital in 1994. The new hospital, as of 2022 is one of eleven operated by Grey Bruce Health Services. The hospital employs 107 staff.

As of 2022, the 12 of the 22 beds are used for acute care beds and 10 for complex continuing care beds.
