= Chief's Point 28 =

Chief's Point 28 Giigonke Piinsaugen
- Unceded territory
- Chief's Point Indian Reserve No. 28
- Location within Southern Ontario
- Coordinates: 44°41′N 81°17′W
- Country: Canada
- Province: Ontario
- County: Bruce
- First Nation: Saugeen

Area
  - Land: 5.18 km^{2} (2.00 sq mi)

Chief's Point 28 (Ojibwe: Giigonke Piinsaugen) is an Aboriginal reserve located between Sauble Beach and Wiarton, Ontario on Lake Huron. It is one of the reserves of the Saugeen First Nation.

Like Saugeen 29 this band owns land rented to cottagers who pay an annual lease fee for the use of the land. The current (mid 2019) lease contract between the cottagers and the two Reserves is in effect until 30 April 2021.
