= Saugeen 29 =

- Unceded territory
- Saugeen Indian Reserve No. 29
- Location within Southern Ontario
- Coordinates: 44°33′N 81°18′W
- Country: Canada
- Province: Ontario
- County: Bruce
- First Nation: Saugeen

Area
  - Land: 41.54 km^{2} (16.04 sq mi)

Population (2016)
  - Total: 1,041
  - Density: 25.1/km^{2} (65/sq mi)
- Website: www.saugeenfirstnation.ca

Saugeen 29 is a First Nations reserve in Bruce County, Ontario. It is the main reserve of the Saugeen First Nation.

Like Chief's Point 28, this band owns land that is rented to cottagers who pay an annual lease fee for the use of the land. The current (mid 2019) lease contract between the cottagers and the two Reserves is in effect until 30 April 2021.

Some years ago, the Saugeen First Nation successfully reclaimed the land that "runs south from the Sauble Beach sign toward Southampton, 18 kilometres away", according to one news report. The beach area to the south of Main St. in the community is referred to by the band as Sauble Park or South Sauble Beach Park. In addition to the south Sauble Beach, Ontario area, the Saugeen First Nation claims the rights to another stretch of the public beach, approximately 2 km long, west of Lakeshore Boulevard extending to a point between 1st St. South and 6th St. North. This claim has been in litigation since 1990 when the federal government started an action on behalf of the Saugeen First Nation, stating that the area is part of the Saugeen 29 Reserve. The band also filed its own claim in 1995.

== Demographics ==
Canada census – Saugeen 29 community profile

	2021	2016	2011
Population	784 (-24.7% from 2016)	1,041 (43.4% from 2011)	726 (-4.2% from 2006)
Land area	41.42 km^{2} (15.99 sq mi)	41.54 km^{2} (16.04 sq mi)	41.43 km^{2} (16.00 sq mi)
Population density	18.9/km^{2} (49/sq mi)	25.1/km^{2} (65/sq mi)	17.5/km^{2} (45/sq mi)
Median age	43.2 (M: 41.6, F: 45.2)	37.2 (M: 33.8, F: 38.8)	32.4 (M: 32.8, F: 31.7)
Private dwellings	315 (total)	1,466 (total)	1,427 (total)
Median household income		$36,651

References: 2021 2016 2011
