= Lion's Head, Ontario =

Lion's Head
- Community
- Lion's Head Harbour

- Location of Lion's Head in southern Ontario
- Coordinates: 44.98665°N 81.254137°W
- Country: Canada
- Province: Ontario
- County: Bruce County
- Municipality: Northern Bruce Peninsula

Population (2021)
  - Total: 624
- Time zone: UTC-5 (EST)
  - Summer (DST): UTC-4 (EDT)
- Area code: 519
- Website: visitlionshead.ca

Lion's Head is a community in the municipality of Northern Bruce Peninsula, Bruce County, Ontario, Canada. It is located at the midway point of the Bruce Peninsula, about halfway between Wiarton and Tobermory, just east of Ferndale on Bruce Road 9. Lion's Head is located on the 45th parallel north, halfway between the Equator and the North Pole. The town is named after the resemblance of a lion's profile in the rock formation of the Niagara Escarpment. The first post office opened in 1895.

It is a well travelled holiday spot on the coast of Georgian Bay.

The limestone rock formations make it a scenic area for canoeing, kayaking, hiking the Bruce Trail, rock climbing and visiting the marina-lookout by car.

Bruce Peninsula District School is the only secondary school on the Bruce Peninsula north of Wiarton, and one of the few schools in Ontario to go from Kindergarten to grade 12.

There are accommodations, restaurants, shops, and galleries located in Lion's Head. There is also a marina, school, hospital, bank, library, pharmacy, grocery store and several churches in the town. Lion's Head is under the Ontario Provincial Police (OPP) jurisdiction. There is also the Northern Bruce Peninsula Fire Department, which operates four trucks in the region.

Lion's Head and the surrounding region experiences four distinct seasons. Winters are often very cold and wet with periods of significant snow accumulation, often a result of lake-effect snow. Summers are warm and comfortable with lower humidity when compared to the rest of southern Ontario, as the Bruce Peninsula is largely influenced by the surrounding lake breezes of Lake Huron and Georgian Bay, which have a moderating effect on temperatures.

== Bus Transportation ==
- First Student Canada (buses from Owen Sound Ontario)

== Demographics ==
In the 2021 Census of Population conducted by Statistics Canada, Lion's Head had a population of 624 living in 299 of its 419 total private dwellings, a change of 4.5% from its 2016 population of 597. With a land area of 2.01 km^{2} (0.78 sq mi), it had a population density of 310.4/km^{2} (804.1/sq mi) in 2021.
