= Brockton, Ontario =

Brockton
- Municipality (lower-tier)
- Municipality of Brockton
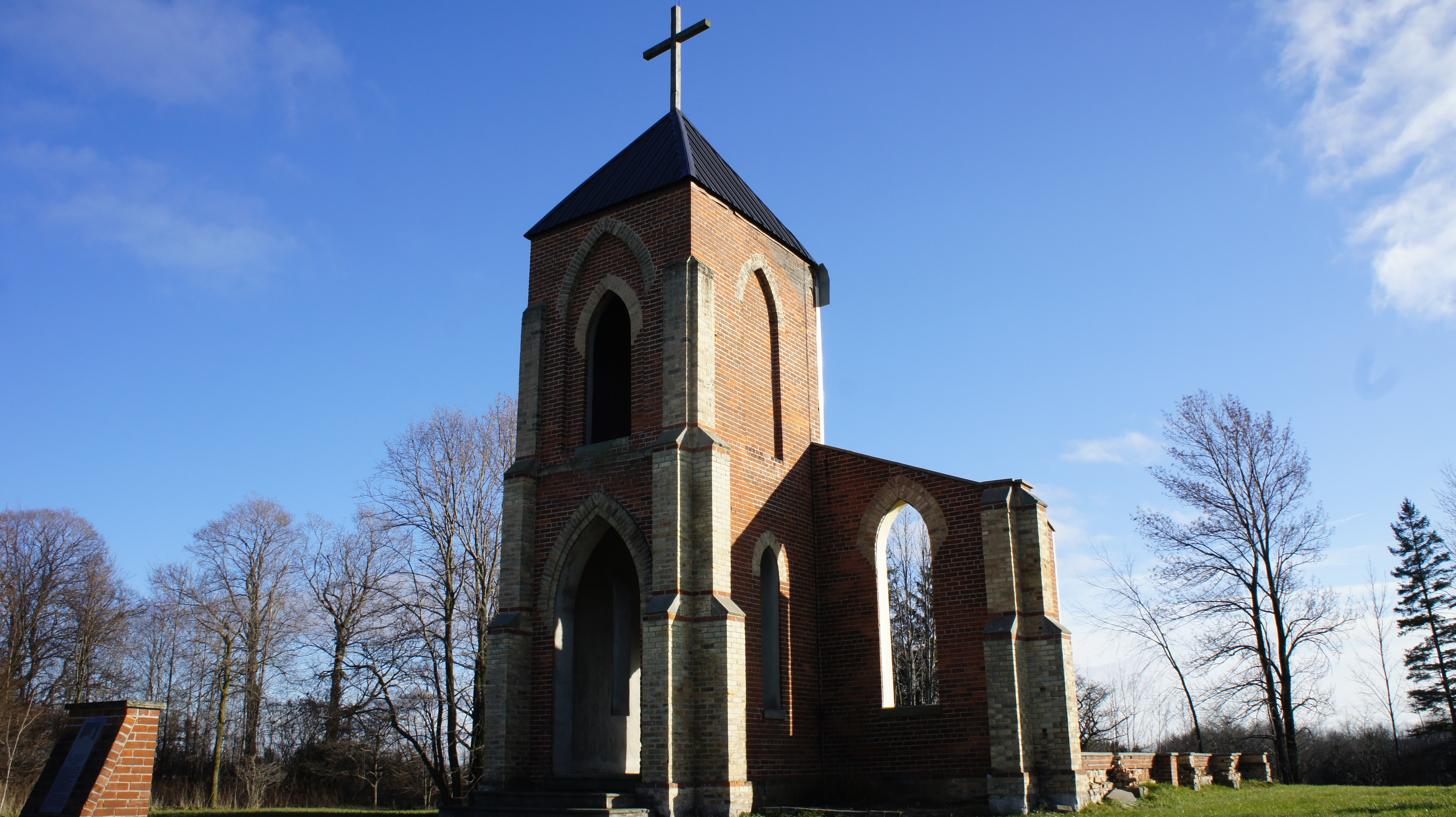
- St. Michael Church remains, Brant

- Location within Bruce County Location within Southern Ontario
- Coordinates: 44°10′N 81°13′W
- Country: Canada
- Province: Ontario
- County: Bruce
- Settled: 1848
- Formed: January 1, 1999

Government
  - Mayor: Chris Peabody
  - Federal riding: Huron—Bruce
  - Prov. riding: Huron—Bruce

Area
  - Land: 564.64 km^{2} (218.01 sq mi)

Population (2021)
  - Total: 9,784
  - Density: 17.3/km^{2} (45/sq mi)
- Time zone: UTC−05:00 (EST)
  - Summer (DST): UTC−04:00 (EDT)
- Postal Code FSA: N0G
- Area codes: 519 and 226
- Website: www.brockton.ca

Brockton is a municipality in the Canadian province of Ontario, located in Bruce County. As of 2021, the population was 9,784.

The current municipality was formed on January 1, 1999, by amalgamating the former township of Brant, former township of Greenock and the town of Walkerton. Brockton's name was formed as a portmanteau of the three merged municipalities (Brant Greenock Walkerton).

== Communities ==
Communities in the Municipality of Brockton include the former town of Walkerton and the villages within the boundaries of the two former Brant and Greenock Townships: Bradley, Cargill, Chepstow, Dunkeld, Eden Grove, Glammis, Greenock, Little Egypt, Malcolm, Maple Hill, Narva, Marle Lake, Lake Rosalind, Pearl Lake, Pinkerton, Portal, Riversdale and Solway.

== Demographics ==
In the 2021 Census of Population conducted by Statistics Canada, Brockton had a population of 9,784 living in 4,032 of its 4,406 total private dwellings, a change of 3.4% from its 2016 population of 9,461. With a land area of 564.64 km^{2} (218.01 sq mi), it had a population density of 17.3/km^{2} (44.9/sq mi) in 2021.

Canada census – Brockton community profile

	2021	2016	2011
Population	9,784 (+3.4% from 2016)	9,461 (+0.3% from 2011)	9,432 (-2.2% from 2006)
Land area	564.64 km^{2} (218.01 sq mi)	565.18 km^{2} (218.22 sq mi)	565.41 km^{2} (218.31 sq mi)
Population density	17.3/km^{2} (45/sq mi)	16.7/km^{2} (43/sq mi)	16.7/km^{2} (43/sq mi)
Median age	44.8 (M: 43.6, F: 46.0)	46.2 (M: 45.0, F: 47.5)	45.0 (M: 44.4, F: 45.5)
Private dwellings	4,406 (total) 4,032 (occupied)	4,252 (total)	4,157 (total)
Median household income	$84,000	$67,597

References: 2021 2016 2011

Historical census populations – Brockton, Ontario
Year	Pop.	±%
2001	9,658	—
2006	9,641	−0.2%
2011	9,432	−2.2%
2016	9,461	+0.3%
2021	9,784	+3.4%
Source: Statistics Canada

Population trend prior to amalgamation:

- Population total in 1996: 10,163
  - Brant (township): 3,455
  - Greenock (township): 1,672
  - Walkerton (town): 5,036
- Population in 1991:
  - Brant (township): 3,420
  - Greenock (township): 1,741
  - Walkerton (town): 4,939

Mother tongue (2021):

- English as first language: 95.8%
- French as first language: 0.4%
- English and French as first language: 0.3%
- Other as first language: 3.0%

== Government ==
List of former mayors:

- David Thomson (1999–2003)
- Charlie Bagnato (2003–2010)
- David Inglis (2010–2018)
- Chris Peabody (2018–present)

== See also ==
- Bruce County municipal elections, 2010
- List of townships in Ontario
