= Northern Bruce Peninsula =

- Municipality (lower-tier)
- Municipality of Northern Bruce Peninsula
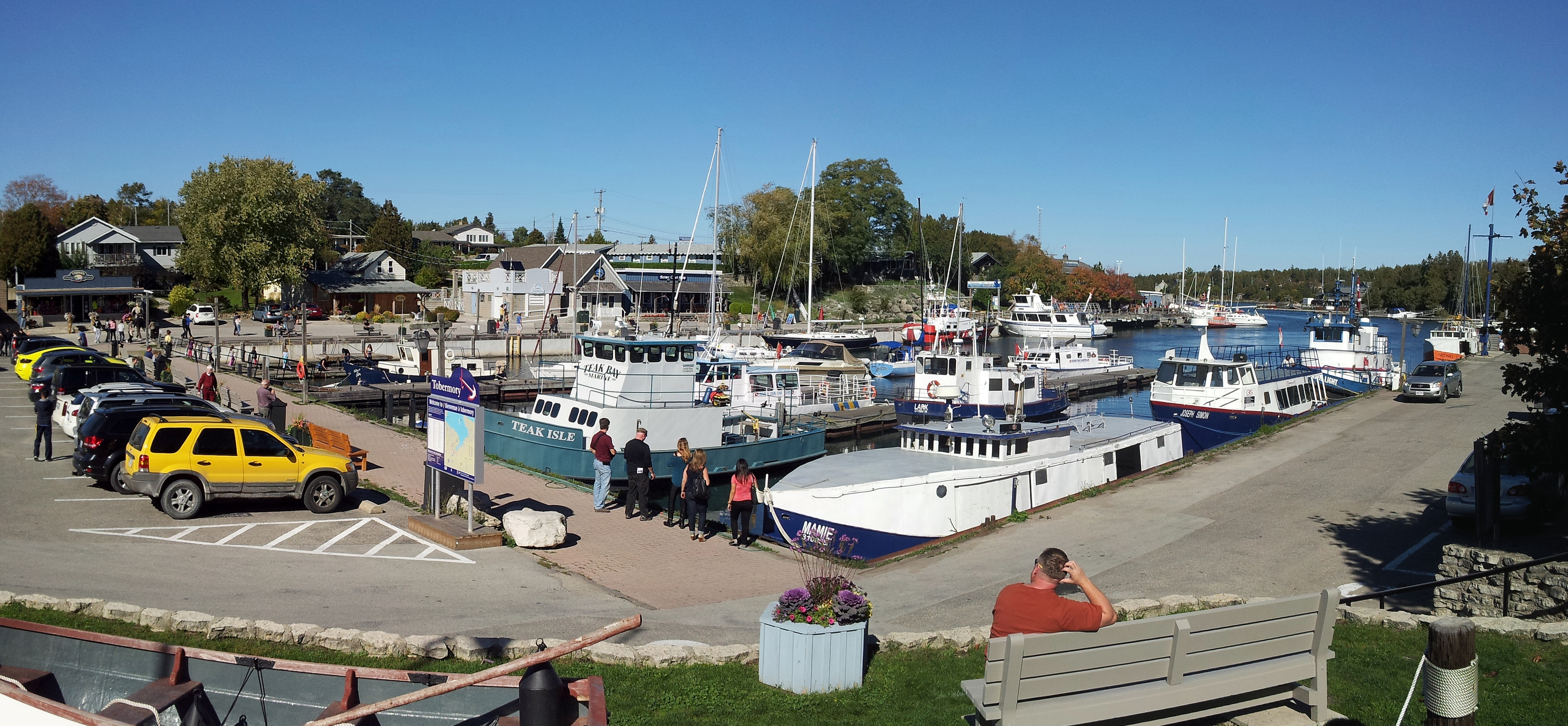
- Tobermory

- Location within Bruce County Location within Southern Ontario
- Coordinates: 45°05′57″N 81°24′25″W
- Country: Canada
- Province: Ontario
- County: Bruce
- Formed: January 1, 1999

Government
  - Mayor: Milt McIver
  - Fed. riding: Bruce—Grey—Owen Sound
  - Prov. riding: Bruce—Grey—Owen Sound

Area
  - Land: 775.70 km^{2} (299.50 sq mi)

Population (2021)
  - Total: 4,404
  - Density: 5.7/km^{2} (15/sq mi)
- Time zone: UTC-5 (EST)
  - Summer (DST): UTC-4 (EDT)
- Postal Code: N0H
- Area codes: 519, 226
- Website: www.northbrucepeninsula.ca

The Municipality of Northern Bruce Peninsula is located on the Bruce Peninsula in Bruce County, Ontario, Canada. It is a popular vacation spot in the summer for its water sports and cottaging, and in the winter for snowmobiling. The municipality was formed on January 1, 1999, when the townships of St. Edmunds, Lindsay, and Eastnor (which was named after Eastnor, Herefordshire), as well as the Village of Lion's Head, were amalgamated.

It is home to the Bruce Peninsula National Park, the Fathom Five National Marine Park, and the Lion's Head Provincial Park.

== Communities ==
Map of Northern Bruce Peninsula municipality.

Its main population centres are Lion's Head and Tobermory. Other communities include:

- Barrow Bay
- Clarke's Corners
- Dyers Bay
- Ferndale
- Hope Bay
- Miller Lake
- Pike Bay
- Stokes Bay

== Demographics ==
In the 2021 Census of Population conducted by Statistics Canada, Northern Bruce Peninsula had a population of 4,404 living in 2,206 of its 5,101 total private dwellings, a change of 10.1% from its 2016 population of 3,999. With a land area of 775.7 km^{2} (299.5 sq mi), it had a population density of 5.7/km^{2} (14.7/sq mi) in 2021.

Canada census – Northern Bruce Peninsula community profile

	2021	2016	2011
Population	4,404 (+10.1% from 2016)	3999 (6.8% from 2011)	3744 (−2.8% from 2006)
Land area	775.70 km^{2} (299.50 sq mi)	783.99 km^{2} (302.70 sq mi)	781.77 km^{2} (301.84 sq mi)
Population density	5.7/km^{2} (15/sq mi)	5.1/km^{2} (13/sq mi)	4.8/km^{2} (12/sq mi)
Median age	61.6 (M: 62.0, F: 61.6)	60.4 (M: 60.1, F: 60.6)	57.3 (M: 57.1, F: 57.5)
Private dwellings	5,101 (total) 2,206 (occupied)	5069 (total)	4954 (total)
Median household income	$69,500	$39,787

References: 2021 2016 2011

Historical census populations – Northern Bruce Peninsula
Year	Pop.	±%
2001	3,599	—
2006	3,850	+7.0%
2011	3,744	−2.8%
2016	3,999	+6.8%
2021	4,404	+10.1%
Source: Statistics Canada

- Population total in 1996: 3500
  - Eastnor (township): 1443
  - Lindsay (township): 500
  - Lion's Head (village): 550
  - St. Edmunds (township): 1007

== See also ==
- List of townships in Ontario
