= Bruce County =

- County (upper-tier)
- County of Bruce
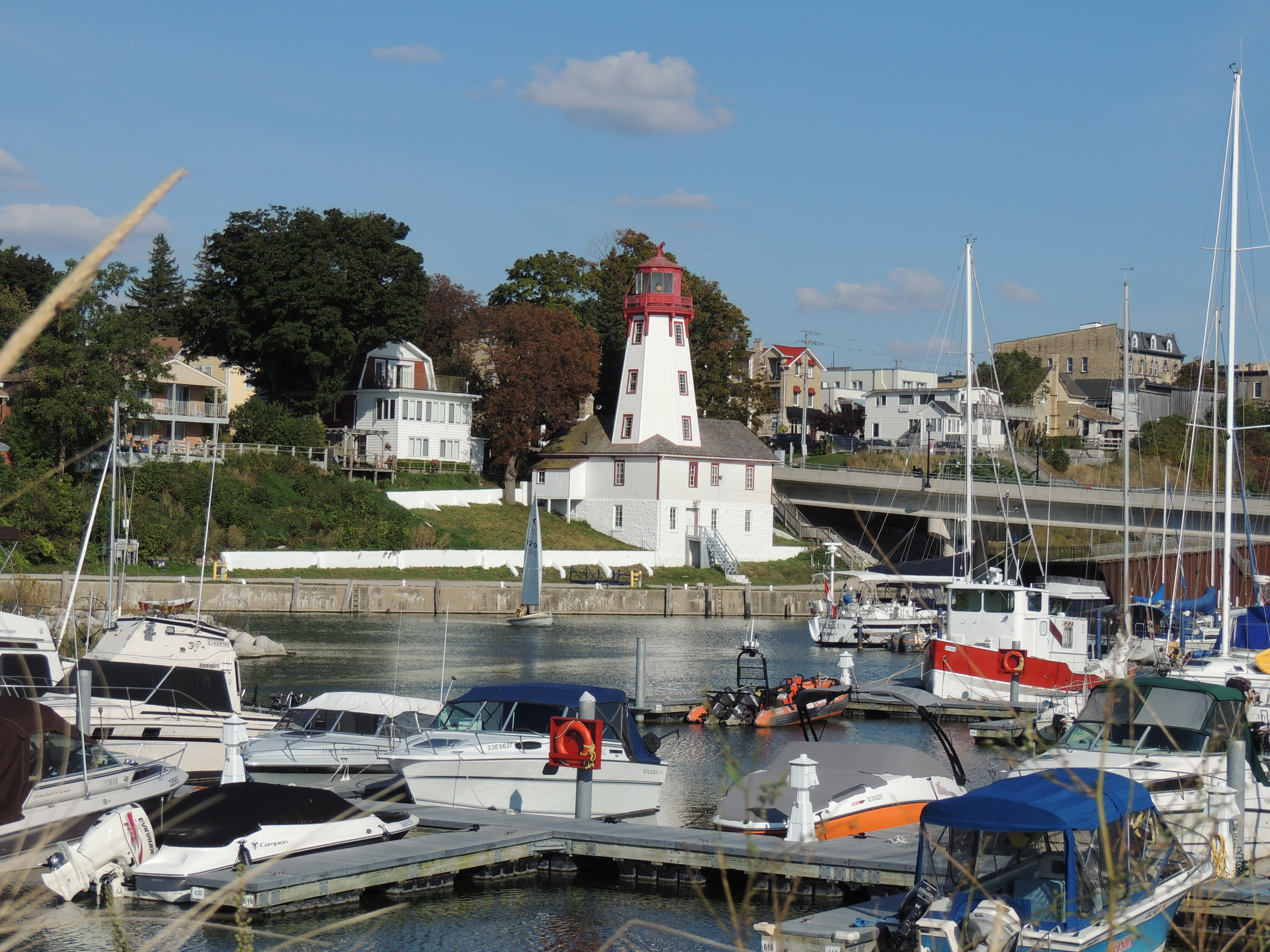
- Marina in Kincardine

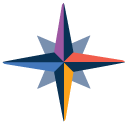
- Icon
- Motto: "In Deo Imperium Sed Populus Administrat" (Latin for "Administration by the People, but under the authority of God")
- Coordinates: 44°30′17″N 81°14′58″W
- Country: Canada
- Province: Ontario
- County seat: Walkerton

Government
  - Warden: Luke Charbonneau
  - Chief Administrative Officer: Christine MacDonald

Area
  - Land: 4,076.22 km^{2} (1,573.84 sq mi)

Population (2021)
  - Total: 73,396
  - Density: 18/km^{2} (47/sq mi)
- Time zone: UTC-5 (EST)
  - Summer (DST): UTC-4 (EDT)
- GNBC Code: FEQQX
- Primary Highways: 21, 9, and 6
- Website: www.brucecounty.on.ca

Bruce County is a county in Southwestern Ontario, Canada. It has eight lower-tier municipalities with a total 2021 population of 73,396. It is named for James Bruce, 8th Earl of Elgin and 12th Earl of Kincardine, the sixth Governor General of the Province of Canada. The Bruce name is also linked to the Bruce Trail and the Bruce Peninsula.

The county has three distinct areas. The Bruce Peninsula is part of the Niagara Escarpment and is known for its views, rock formations, cliffs, and hiking trails. The Lakeshore includes nearly 100 km of fresh water and soft sandy beaches. Finally, the Interior Region has a strong history in farming.

== History ==
=== Cessions of First Nations lands ===
The territory of the County arose from various surrenders of First Nations lands.

The bulk of the land arose from the Queen's Bush, as a result of the 1836 Saugeen Tract Agreement. That was followed by the cession of the Indian Strip in 1851 for a road between Owen Sound and Southampton that was never constructed. Friction between the Chippewas arising out of that led to significant delay in later negotiations.

The Saugeen Surrenders of 1854, known as "Treaty 72," transferred the remainder of the Bruce Peninsula to the Crown and reserved the following lands:

Reserved for	Tract	Later disposition
Saugeen Indians	Saugeen	now known as Saugeen 29
Saugeen Indians	Chief's Point	now known as Chief's Point 28
Owen Sound Indians	Newash	Surrendered to the Crown in 1857 under the Peter Jones Treaty (also known as "Treaty 82"), becoming Sarawak Township in Grey County. Resulting land sales were for the benefit of the Indians, who would be moved to Cape Croker.
Owen Sound Indians	Cape Croker	now known as Neyaashiinigmiing 27
Colpoy's Bay Indians	Colpoy's Bay	Surrendered to the Crown in 1861 under "Treaty 93", becoming part of Keppel Township in Grey County. Resulting land sales were for the benefit of the Indians, who would be moved to Christian Island.

=== Municipal history ===
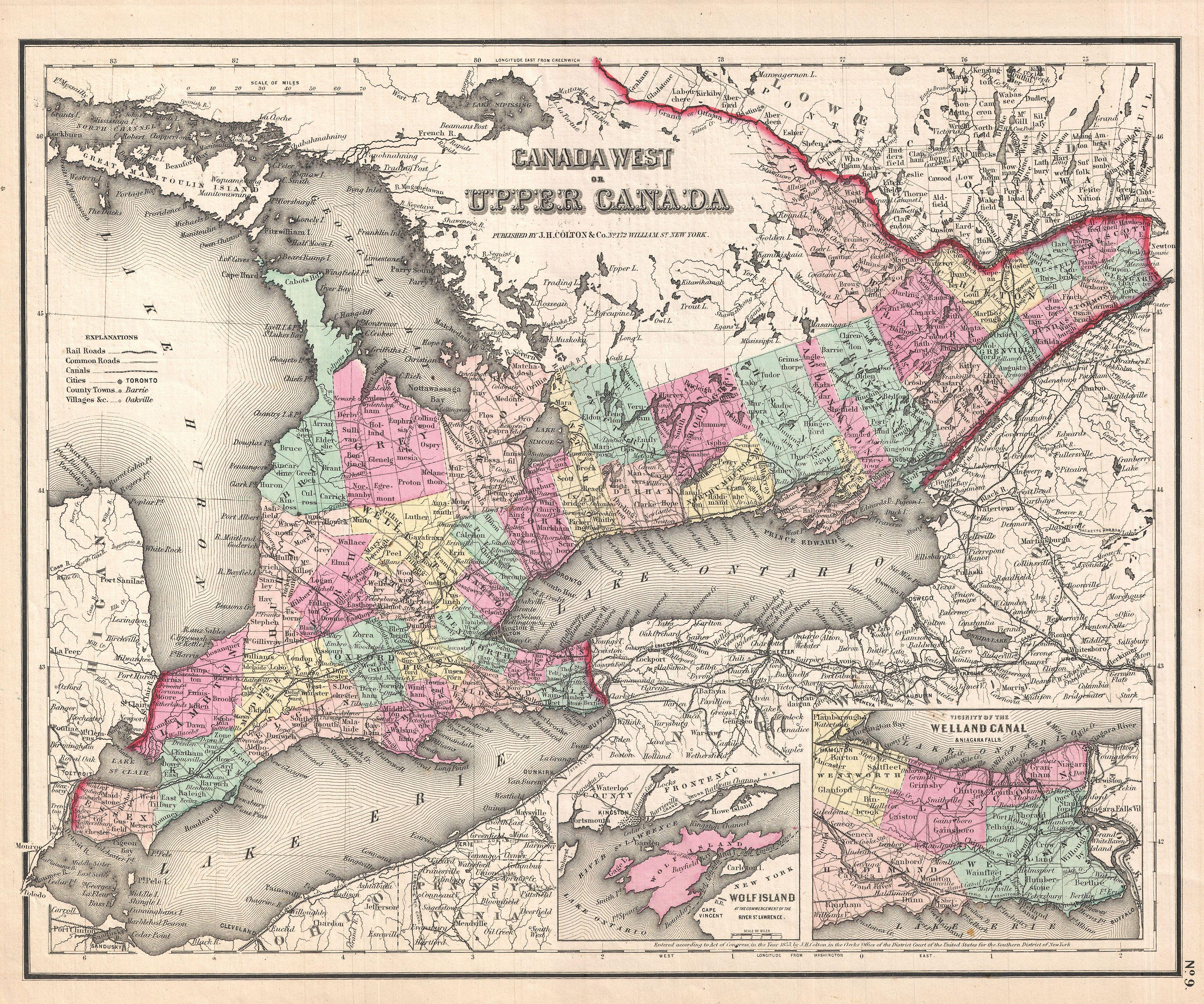
Canada West in 1857. Bruce County is marked in light green.

Huron County was organized in the Huron District in 1845, and the District itself, which had been continued for judicial purposes, was abolished in early 1850. Legislation passed later in the same session of the Legislative Assembly of the Province of Canada provided instead for it to be reconstituted as the United Counties of Huron, Perth and Bruce, with the territory of the Bruce Peninsula (referred to as the "Indian Reserve") to be withdrawn and annexed to Waterloo County. Bruce County consisted of the following townships:

- Huron
- Kinloss
- Culross
- Carrick
- Kincardine
- Greenock
- Brant
- Bruce
- Saugeen
- Elderslie
- Arran

The Indian Reserve (being the part not otherwise transferred to Grey County) was later withdrawn from Waterloo and transferred to Bruce in 1851. The County of Perth was given its own Provisional Municipal Council at that time, and was separated from the United Counties in 1853.

In 1849, the Huron District Council initially united the area of the county with the United Townships of Wawanosh and Ashfield as a single municipality, which lasted until 1851, when Wawanosh and Ashfield were withdrawn. The area then became known as the "United Townships in the County of Bruce," which lasted until its division into municipalities in 1854.

The Bruce Peninsula was later surveyed into townships, starting with Amabel and Albemarle in 1855, Eastnor in 1862, followed by Lindsay in 1870 and St. Edmunds in 1871.

The following villages and towns would be constituted over the years:

Bruce County urban municipalities (with date of incorporation)
Villages	Towns
Lucknow (police village 1863, village 1874) (Note: Because the village limits were partially in Bruce and partially in Huron, there was controversy as to which county the village should be attached. That was resolved by a proclamation issued in June 1874.); Port Elgin (1873); Paisley (1874); Teeswater (1875); Tiverton (1879); Tara (1881)	Kincardine (village 1858, town 1875) (Note: The intended name was Penetangore, but that was changed to Kincardine in the incorporating bylaw.); Southampton (village 1858, town 1904); Walkerton (1871); Chesley (village 1880, town 1906); Wiarton (village 1880, town 1894)

=== Formation of separate county council (1857–1867) ===
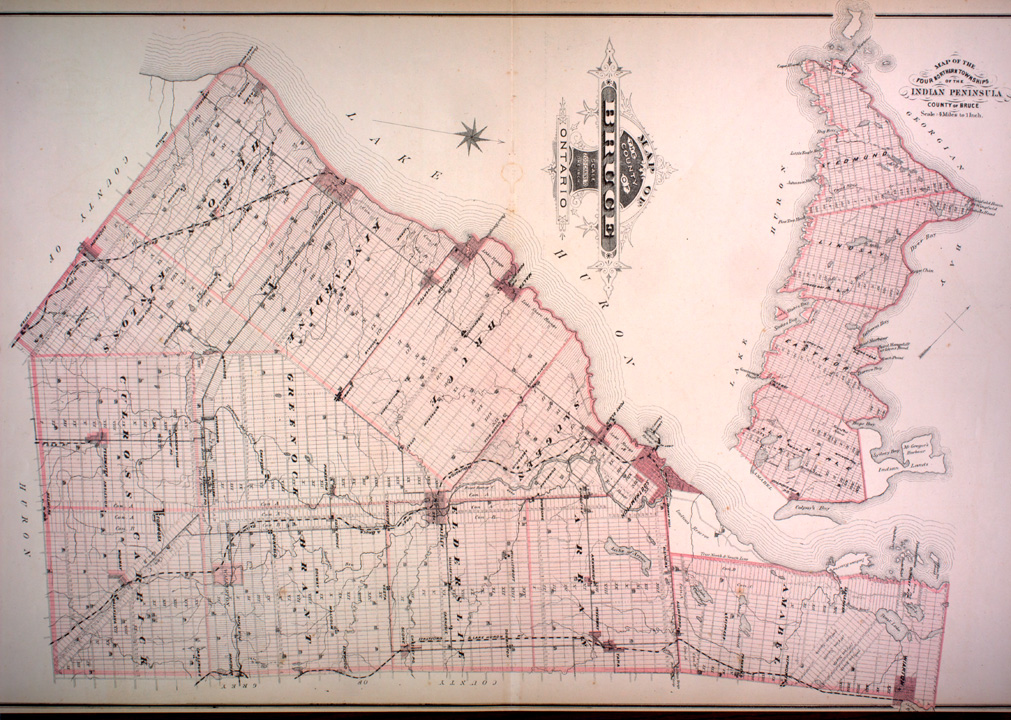
Townships of Bruce County, Ontario, 1880

A Provisional Municipal Council was established for Bruce County at the beginning of 1857, Walkerton was initially proclaimed as the county seat, in preference to Kincardine, but local opposition (Note: Including an abortive attempt to have the county divided into Bruce and Saugeen, with Kincardine and Southampton contemplated as the respective county towns, and the proposed boundary being the Brant/Elderslie line, the 17th and 18th concessions of Greenock, and the 7th and 8th concessions of Bruce.) forced the proclamation to be deferred until each town and village had presented a case for its selection. A subsequent proclamation confirmed Walkerton's selection.

In 1863, the provisional council promoted a bill in the Legislative Assembly to divide the county into the counties of Bruce and Wallace, with Kincardine and Southampton once more proposed as the respective county towns, but it went only as far as thé second reading and did not proceed further.

The provisional council later asked for legislation to provide for a referendum as to whether Walkerton, Paisley, Kincardine, or another place would be the most acceptable choice of county seat. The referendum was held in September 1864, and Paisley received a plurality of the votes. In early 1865, the provisional council asked for legislation to confirm the result but changed its mind later in the year in favour of Walkerton. Confirming legislation was passed in 1866 to provide for the dissolution of the United Counties on January 1, 1867, with Huron and Bruce becoming separate counties for all purposes.

== Indigenous lands ==
Two First Nations are included within the Bruce census division, but their lands are separate from the county administration:

Saugeen First Nation	Chippewas of Nawash Unceded First Nation
Chief's Point 28; Saugeen 29; Saugeen Hunting Grounds 60A	Neyaashiinigmiing 27; Cape Croker Hunting Ground 60B
Saugeen and Cape Croker Fishing Islands 1

=== Land disputes ===
There have been disputes relating to cottage owners leasing properties on First Nations lands in the county. At Hope Bay, the occupiers of 68 cottages saw their leases revoked in 2007, resulting in a lawsuit that was only settled in 2018, leading to the resulting demolition of the cottages. In the Saugeen and Chief's Point reserves, there are four blocks of land encompassing 1,200 cottages that had been subject to ten-year lease agreements, on which a new five-year agreement came into effect in May 2021.

Litigation is underway, in which the Saugeen Ojibway First Nation is claiming the following:

1. Compensation resulting from the Crown breaching its fiduciary trust to protect and preserve the territory of the Saugeen Ojibway Nation;
2. Aboriginal title over the water territory around the Bruce Peninsula, from the international boundary with the United States in Lake Huron across to Georgian Bay; and
3. A declaration that their harvesting (i.e., hunting and fishing) rights within their traditional territory were not extinguished by Treaty 72 of 1854.

In July 2021, the Ontario Superior Court dismissed the first two claims, but upheld the third. It deferred the question of liability with respect to municipal defendants for a subsequent hearing. An appeal has been filed with respect to the dismissals. Settlements on municipal liability have since been reached with Bruce County and Saugeen Shores.

The Saugeen First Nation is pursuing separate litigation relating to the determination of the actual reserve boundary. Treaty 72 had originally provided for the following reservation of land:

...for the benefit of the Saugeen Indians we reserve all that block of land bounded on the west by a straight line running due north from the River Saugeen, at the spot where it is entered by a ravine, immediately to the west of the village [of Saugeen], (Note: later to become Southampton) and over which a bridge has recently been constructed, to the shore of Lake Huron; on the south by the aforesaid northern limit of the lately surrendered strip; on the east by a line drawn from a spot upon the coast at a distance of about (9½) nine miles and a half from the western boundary aforesaid, and running parallel thereto until it touches the aforementioned northern limits of the recently surrendered strip; and we wish it to be clearly understood that we wish the Peninsula at the mouth of the Saugeen River to the west of the western boundary aforesaid to be laid out in town park lots and sold for our benefit without delay; and we also wish it to be understood that our surrender includes that parcel of land which is in continuation of the strip recently surrendered to the Saugeen River.

A dispute has arisen because the original survey of Amabel Township appears to be at variance with the treaty's specifications, with the eastern limit being drawn at 8 miles from the western limit, instead of the 9½ stated. The matter had been partially resolved some years earlier, with certain lands running from Sauble Beach down to Southampton reverting to the reserve. However, another part of the public beach in Sauble Beach, approximately 2 km in length, is still in dispute. The matter has been in protracted litigation, with separate claims being filed in 1990 by the federal government and in 1995 by the First Nation. An attempted settlement, arising from mediation overseen by the former Supreme Court of Canada justice Ian Binnie, collapsed in 2014. The case hearing began in November 2021. In the meantime, some friction has occurred between the First Nation and local authorities over maintenance work being undertaken on the local dunes.

The southern portion of Sauble Beach, known as Sauble Park, is within the limits of the reserve. As of 2018, beach parking is no longer available there, in line with what is already the case at Wasaga Beach and Grand Bend.

In April 2023, the Ontario Superior Court ruled that the entire portion of the fish landing ground fronting on Lake Huron that was reserved from surrender in Treaty 72, being the substantial part of Sauble Beach, continues to be part of the Saugeen reserve, and no third parties have an interest in any part of it. A proposal to allow a life interest to the private landowners being displaced is currently under consideration by the court. The Town of South Bruce Peninsula subsequently announced that it would take the case to the Ontario Court of Appeal.

== Demographics ==
As a census division in the 2021 Census of Population conducted by Statistics Canada, Bruce County had a population of 73,396 living in 31,112 of its 42,592 total private dwellings, a change of 7.7% from its 2016 population of 68,147. With a land area of 4,076.22 km^{2} (1,573.84 sq mi), it had a population density of 18.0/km^{2} (46.6/sq mi) in 2021.

Canada census – Bruce community profile

	2021	2016	2011
Population	73,396 (+7.7% from 2016)	68,147 (3.1% from 2011)	66,102 (1.2% from 2006)
Land area	4,076.22 km^{2} (1,573.84 sq mi)	4,090.20 km^{2} (1,579.24 sq mi)	4,087.76 km^{2} (1,578.29 sq mi)
Population density	18/km^{2} (47/sq mi)	16.7/km^{2} (43/sq mi)	16.2/km^{2} (42/sq mi)
Median age	48.0 (M: 46.4, F: 49.2)	48.5 (M: 47.2, F: 49.5)	47.0 (M: 46.3, F: 47.6)
Private dwellings	42,592 (total) 31,112 (occupied)	41,183 (total)	40,033 (total)
Median household income	$87,000	$71,193

References: 2021 2016 2011

Historical census populations – Bruce County

Year	Pop.	±%
1976	57,472	—
1981	60,020	+4.4%
1986	58,848	−2.0%
1991	65,268	+10.9%
1996	65,680	+0.6%

Year	Pop.	±%
2001	63,892	−2.7%
2006	65,349	+2.3%
2011	66,102	+1.2%
2016	68,147	+3.1%
2021	73,396	+7.7%

Source: Statistics Canada

== Municipalities ==
Map of Bruce County, on the Lake Huron shoreline of Ontario, Canada, identifying major features and population centres.

Bruce County comprises eight municipalities (in population order):

Municipality	2016 Population	Population Centres
Town of Saugeen Shores	13,715	Port Elgin, Southampton
Municipality of Kincardine	11,389	Kincardine
Municipality of Brockton	9,461	Walkerton
Town of South Bruce Peninsula	8,416	Wiarton, Sauble Beach
Township of Huron-Kinloss	7,069	Lucknow
Municipality of Arran-Elderslie	6,803	Chesley, Paisley
Municipality of South Bruce	5,639	Mildmay
Municipality of Northern Bruce Peninsula	3,999	Lion's Head, Tobermory

The County of Bruce is governed by a council consisting of a warden and mayors of the area municipalities. County council meetings are held in the Bruce County Administration building, in Walkerton.

== See also ==
- Municipalities of Bruce County
- Bruce County municipal elections, 2010
- Ontario municipal elections, 2010
- List of municipalities in Ontario
- List of counties and districts of Canada
- List of townships in Ontario
- List of secondary schools in Ontario#Bruce County
