= Media in Owen Sound =

This is a list of media in the city of Owen Sound in Southwestern Ontario, Canada.

== Radio ==
Frequency	Call sign	Branding	Format	Owner	Notes
FM 89.3	CFOS-FM	89.3 CFOS FM	adult hits	Bayshore Broadcasting	
FM 90.1	CJLF-FM-1	Life 100.3	Christian	Trust Communications	rebroadcasts CJLF-FM Barrie
FM 92.3	CJOS-FM	Zoomer 92.3	Adult hits	ZoomerMedia	new in 2008, period allowed for launch extended by CRTC
FM 93.7	CKYC-FM	Country 93	country	Bayshore Broadcasting	
FM 94.5	CIBU-FM	Cool 94.5	classic hits	Blackburn Radio	licensed to Wingham
FM 97.1	CBL-FM-4	CBC Music	public music	Canadian Broadcasting Corporation	licensed to Wiarton
FM 98.7	CBCB-FM	CBC Radio One	news/talk	Canadian Broadcasting Corporation	
FM 101.7	CKNX-FM	101.7 The One	hot adult contemporary	Blackburn Radio	licensed to Wingham
FM 106.5	CIXK-FM	Mix 106.5	adult contemporary	Bayshore Broadcasting	

== Television ==
The Owen Sound area is not designated as a mandatory market for digital television conversion. All broadcasting stations except CIII-DT 4 are analogue repeaters of stations based elsewhere.

- Channel 2: CKCO-TV-2 - CTV Television Network - (Transmitter at Wiarton, Ontario and an analogue rebroadcaster of CKCO-DT 13 from Kitchener, Ontario) (Since 2014 no longer in operation as only 35 residents complained when it was off the air due to technical difficulties.)
- Channel 4.1: CIII-TV-4, Global Television Network
- Channel 8: CKNX-TV, CTV 2 (repeater of CFPL-DT London)
- Channel 52: Rogers TV Grey County is headquartered in Owen Sound on 20th St. E.

== Print ==
- Owen Sound Sun Times
