= Negro Creek (Ontario) =

Road, river, and historic site of an early Black settlement

Negro Creek is the name of a road, a river, and the historic site of an early Black settlement. It is situated along Highway 6 south of Williamsford, in Grey County, Ontario. The river's headwaters originate in the marshland at 44.3576°N 80.8057°W and the waterway then travels westward to empty into the North Saugeen River at 44.3660°N 80.9166°W, just north of McCullough Lake. The road begins at the T intersection with Concession 3b at 44.3680°N 80.8075°W and moves westward for 4.8 kilometres (3.0 mi) to intersect with Highway 6 at 44.3616°N 80.8672°W, where the throughway changes its name to Moto Park Road as it continues west.

== History ==
=== Early settlement ===
The fertile land along Negro Creek and the Negro Lakes, as well as its proximity to the Garafraxa road (now Highway 6) made the Negro Creek district a favourable choice for early settlers. By 1851, roughly 50 Black families had settled in the Negro Creek district. Some of these families may have made their way into the area shortly after the War of 1812, even before the Government of Upper Canada had negotiated and signed Treaty 45 1/2 with the Saugeen Ojibway Nation. The first documented evidence of the community is on a Patents plan for Holland Township dated December 29, 1851. In it, the stream intersecting Garafraxa road was named Negro Creek, indicating that the community was by that time well established.

The 1851 census for Holland and Sullivan townships in Grey county lists the following "coloured" families living in the area: Earll, Douglas, Miller, Bowie, Barnes, White, Chuckee, Pierce, Armstrong, Woods, Gorman, Ross, and others. Some are listed as farmers, others as labourers. These families would have cleared the forests, ploughed the fields, and operated the limestone kiln in use at the time.

=== Name change controversy ===
The area name, and its road signage, has gone through a number of changes since the original Black settlement. Before 1960, the road and creek was referred to locally by a number of names, including Nigger's Creek. In the 1960s, the MTO installed official highway signage naming it Negro Creek Road.

In August 1995, Grey County was implementing a civic numbering system to allow for 911 emergency telephone service, and required that each township adopt official names for all roads. Holland council decided to re-name Negro Creek Road, adopting the name Moggie Road after a 19th century white settler George Moggie who resided in Holland Township.

Descendants of the original Black settlers, together with local residents, protested the name change. In January 1996, Carolynn Wilson on behalf of the descendants, filed a dispute with Holland Township to the Ontario Human Rights Commission. . In an interview with The Sun Times (Owen Sound), she said, "It's a part of our history and we as descendants have no problem with the road name Negro Creek Road". Descendants of the road also distributed a petition to keep the name Negro Creek road, and received upwards of 4000 signatures, including many of the residents of the road. They were further supported by the Ontario Black History Society, the Mississauga Caribbean Society, and Collingwood Township, as well as former Ontario MPP Alvin Curling and former lieutenant Governor Lincoln Alexander

The dispute was settled and Holland township reversed the name change in December 1997.

== In popular culture ==
Negro Creek is the setting of the play The Adventures of a Black Girl in Search of God, written by Canadian playwright Djanet Sears. The production ran from October 2003-March 2004, and was reprised in 2015 at the National Arts Centre and Centaur Theatre. A print version of this play was published by Playwrights Canada Press in 2003.

== See also ==
- Buxton National Historic Site and Museum
- Oro-Medonte
- North Buxton
- Underground Railroad
- Priceville, Ontario
