= Mulock, Grey County =

Mulock
- Dispersed Rural Community
- Etymology: Named for William Mulock
- Location in Southern Ontario
- Coordinates: 44°13′33″N 80°55′22″W
- Country: Canada
- Province: Ontario
- County: Grey
- Municipality: West Grey
- Elevation: 325 m (1,066 ft)
- Time zone: UTC-5 (Eastern Time Zone)
  - Summer (DST): UTC-4 (Eastern Time Zone)
- Postal Code: N0G 1R0

Mulock is a dispersed rural community and unincorporated place in the municipality of West Grey, Grey County in Southwestern Ontario, Canada, named for William Mulock.

Mulock Christian Fellowship, a church, is and Durham (Mulock) Airport was located in the community. The Saugeen River flows by southwest of Mulock.

== See also ==
- List of unincorporated communities in Ontario
