= West Grey Police =

West Grey Police Police de West Grey
- Motto: Community Partners

Agency overview
- Formed: 2001

Operational structure
- Headquarters: 153 George Street West, Durham, Ontario 44.17766125454157°N 80.81962143530443°W
- Sworn members: 25
- Unsworn members: 5
- Elected officer responsible: Hon. Sylvia Jones, Solicitor General of Ontario

Facilities
- Stations: 2

Website
- www.westgreypolice.ca

The West Grey Police (WGP; French: Police de West Grey) are the police service for the Municipality of West Grey in southwestern Ontario. West Grey is an amalgamated municipality, consisting of the former townships of Bentinck, Glenelg and Normanby, the former villages of Neustadt, Ayton, Elmwood and the former town of Durham. West Grey is geographically the largest municipality in Grey County, with a population of approximately 12,000.

The West Grey Police were formed in 2001, after the disbandment of the Town of Durham Police. All serving members immediately became members of the new service, along with several new members. The townships of Bentinck, Glenelg and Normanby, and the villages of Neustadt, Ayton and Elmwood previously policed by the Ontario Provincial Police, now became the responsibility of the West Grey Police. The police service is headquartered in the Town of Durham with a new headquarters to be completed in early 2026

== Members ==
The service consists of:

- Chief of Police
- Deputy Chief
- 4 Sergeants
- 1 Detective*
- 16 Constables
- 1 Special Constable
- 1 Part Time Constable
- 1 Records Manager
- 1 Auxiliary Sgt
- 4 Auxiliary Constables

== Chiefs of police ==
- A. Paul Metcalfe (2001–2005) - also the last chief of the Town of Durham Police
- Rene M. Berger (2005–2016)
- Robert G. Martin (2016–2025)
- Jeremy White (2025-present)

== Stations ==
- Durham - main station and headquarters
- Ayton - sub-station
