= Salem, Arran–Elderslie, Ontario =

Salem
- Dispersed Rural Community
- Location in southern Ontario
- Coordinates: 44°21′49″N 81°11′22″W
- Country: Canada
- Province: Ontario
- County: Bruce
- Municipality: Arran–Elderslie
- Elevation: 253 m (830 ft)
- Time zone: UTC-5 (Eastern Time Zone)
  - Summer (DST): UTC-4 (Eastern Time Zone)
- Postal Code: N0H 1L0
- Area codes: 519, 226, 548

Salem is a dispersed rural community and unincorporated place in the municipality of Arran–Elderslie, Bruce County in southwestern Ontario, Canada. The community is in geographic Elderslie Township at the intersection of Concession 10 Elderslie and Sideroad 15 South Elderslie, 10 kilometres (6.2 mi) northwest of the community of Chesley and 9 kilometres (5.6 mi) northeast of the community of Paisley. The community is on Snake Creek, a tributary of the Saugeen River.
