= Ayton, Ontario =

Canadian community

Coordinates: 44°03′N 80°56′W

Ayton is a community in the municipality of West Grey, Grey County, Ontario, Canada.

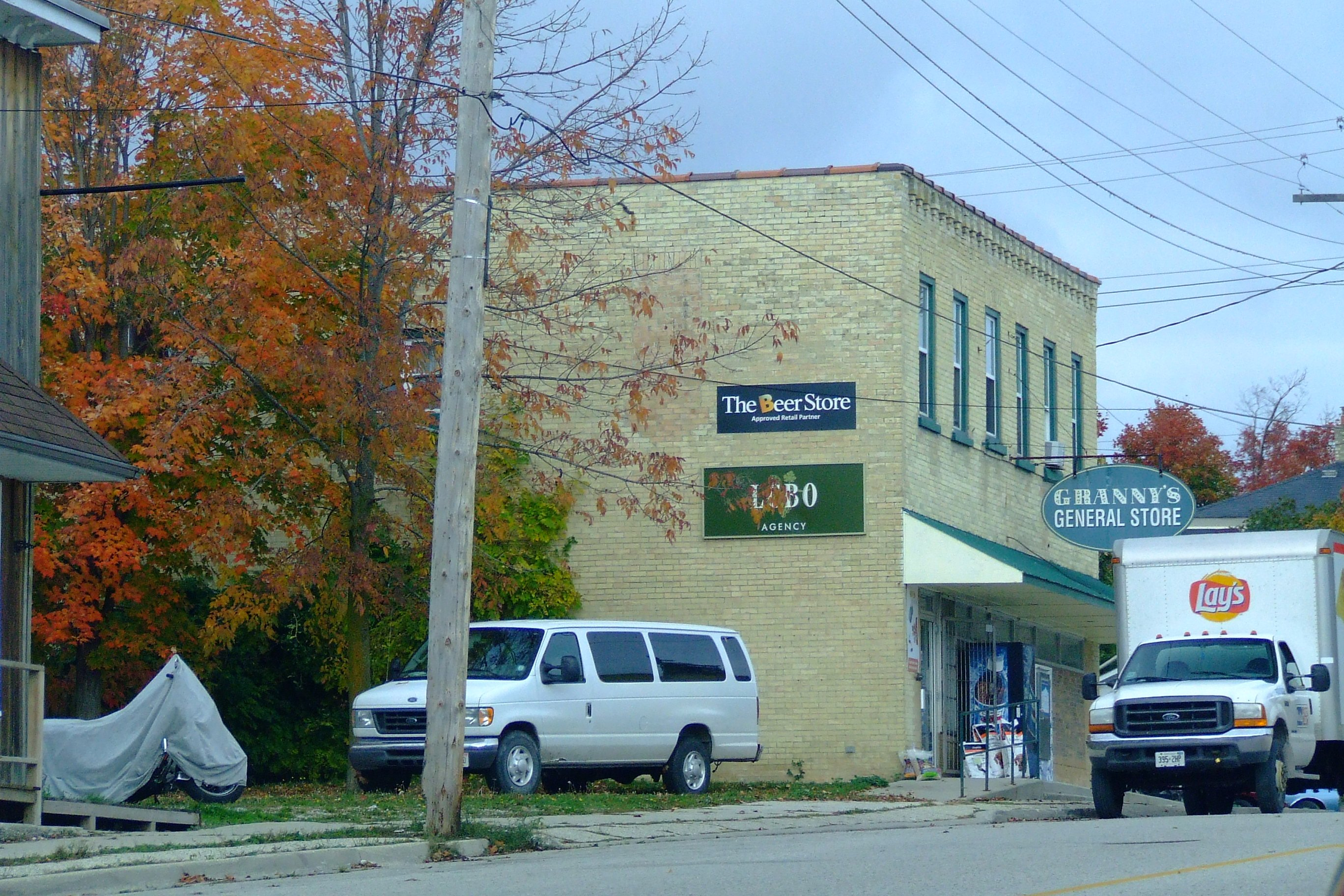
LCBO outlet of Ayton

Formerly the seat of local government for the disbanded Normanby Township, it is a rural village on the banks of the South Saugeen River and the center of a prosperous farming area. Located on the intersection of Grey Road 3 and Grey Road 9, Ayton is geographically south of Hanover, southwest of Durham, and a neighbour to Neustadt.

Although mostly a farming community, Ayton has an arena (ice rink), community hall, recreation hall, elementary school (Normanby Community School), an LCBO Outlet in Granny's General store (ATM), Lutheran Church, ELCIC, Roman Catholic Church and several other businesses. The old water-powered mill, in the heart of the town, has a new career producing hydro for the grid instead of grist for the farmer. Ayton is the home of Fisher Poultry, Domm Construction, Germania Mutual Insurance, Trixie Saloon, Weppler Farm Machinery Ltd. repairing older farm and construction equipment and sales of new smaller shortline equipment, and Filsingers Organic Foods with 100 acres of orchards and a store with a selection of health foods, some of several major industries in West Grey. It is also known for camping at two local camp grounds (Riverplace and Silent Valley). Some small organic farms can be found and some hobby farms. Culture stems from mostly Germanic and Irish settlers, but also some Dutch 1950s, Swiss and Filipino 1990-2000s.

The community takes its name from Ayton, Scottish Borders.
