= Allan Park, Ontario =

Ontarian municipality

Coordinates: 44°10′01″N 80°55′56″W

Allan Park, in the Municipality of West Grey, Grey County, Ontario, Canada is the site of Telesat Canada's Allan Park Earth Station. Allan Park is located on Grey County Road 4 (formerly Ontario Highway 4) between Durham to the east and Hanover to the west, and north of Ayton. Camp Creek, a tributary of the Saugeen River, flows through the settlement.

The community is located north of Allan Park Conservation Area, which includes over 16 kilometres (9.9 mi) of trail systems. The level of difficulty varies, especially for skiing enthusiasts; as well as hiking, biking and running. The park is also home to many sledding hills and a large fishing pond. The area is scenic and hilly, winding through hardwood forests, evergreen plantations and around scenic kettle ponds and cold water springs. The Allan Park Conservation Area is over 161 hectares (400 acres) in area.
