= West Grey =

- Municipality (lower-tier)
- Municipality of West Grey
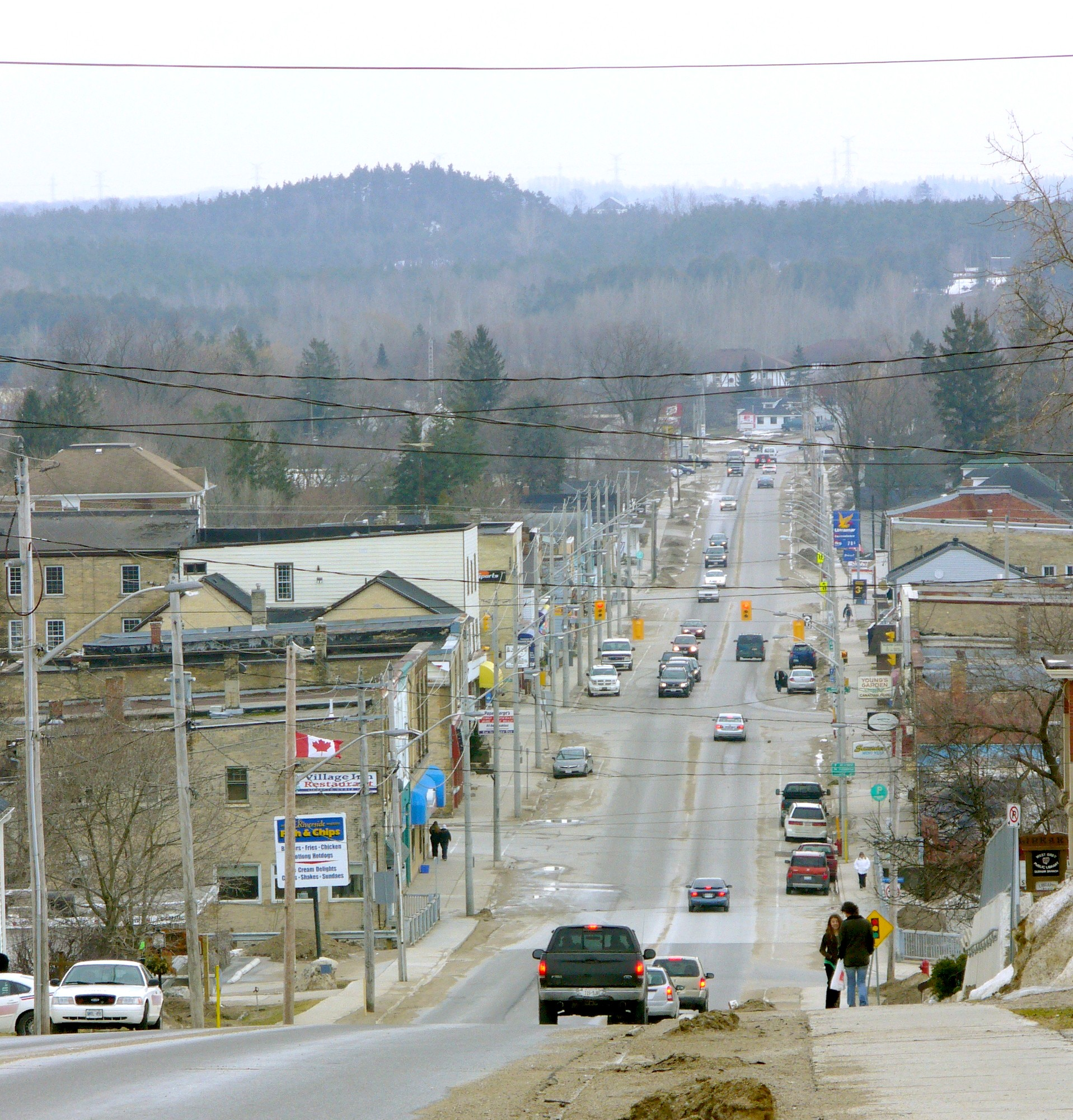
- Durham, seat of and largest community in West Grey

- Location within Grey County Location within Southern Ontario
- Coordinates: 44°11′N 80°49′W
- Country: Canada
- Province: Ontario
- County: Grey
- Formed: January 1, 2000

Government
  - Mayor: Kevin Eccles
  - Fed. riding: Bruce—Grey—Owen Sound
  - Prov. riding: Bruce—Grey—Owen Sound

Area
  - Land: 875.21 km^{2} (337.92 sq mi)

Population (2021)
  - Total: 13,131
  - Density: 15/km^{2} (39/sq mi)
- Time zone: UTC−05:00 (EST)
  - Summer (DST): UTC−04:00 (EDT)
- Postal Code: N0G 1R0
- Area codes: 519, 226
- Website: www.westgrey.com

West Grey is a municipality in the northern area of Southwestern Ontario, Canada, in Grey County spanning across the River Styx, the Rocky Saugeen River, the Saugeen River, the Beatty Saugeen River, and the South Saugeen River.

The municipality was formed by order of the Province of Ontario on January 1, 2000, when the former Townships of Bentinck, Glenelg, and Normanby, as well as the Village of Neustadt, were amalgamated into the new Township of West Grey as part of a county-wide reorganization. On January 1, 2001, the Town of Durham was merged into West Grey.

== Communities ==
The Municipality of West Grey comprises the communities of:

- Aberdeen
- Allan Park
- Alsfeldt
- Ayton
- Barrhead
- Bentinck
- Biemans Corners
- Bunessan
- Calderwood
- Crawford
- Durham
- Edge Hill
- Elmwood
- Glen
- Glenelg Centre
- Habermehl
- Hampden
- Irish Lake
- Lamlash
- Lauderbach
- Lauriston
- Louise
- Moltke
- Mulock
- Nenagh
- Neustadt
- Pomona
- Priceville
- Rocky Saugeen
- Topcliff
- Traverston
- Vickers
- Waudby
- Welbeck

== Demographics ==
In the 2021 Census of Population conducted by Statistics Canada, West Grey had a population of 13,131 living in 5,284 of its 5,808 total private dwellings, a change of 4.9% from its 2016 population of 12,518. With a land area of 875.21 km^{2} (337.92 sq mi), it had a population density of 15.0/km^{2} (38.9/sq mi) in 2021.

Historical census populations – West Grey

Year	Pop.	±%
1996	11,499	—
2001	11,741	+2.1%
2006	12,193	+3.8%

Year	Pop.	±%
2011	12,286	+0.8%
2016	12,518	+1.9%
2021	13,131	+4.9%

Source: Statistics Canada

Populations prior to amalgamation (2001):

- Population total in 1996: 11,499
  - Bentinck (township): 3,597
  - Durham (town): 2,641
  - Glenelg (township): 2,136
  - Neustadt (village): 568
  - Normanby (township): 2,678
- Populations in 1991:
  - Bentinck (township): 3,463
  - Durham (town): 2,558
  - Glenelg (township): 1,871
  - Neustadt (village): 551
  - Normanby (township): 2,797

== Recreation ==
West Grey has a variety of halls and recreation centres across the municipality including: Ayton Centennial Hall, Durham Community Centre, Durham Town Hall, Elmwood Community Centre, Glenel Hall, Lamlash Hall, Neustadt Arena, Neustadt Community Centre and Normanby Arena Complex. Enjoy swimming at the Durham Wading Pool and the Middle Dam on the Saugeen River.

== Infrastructure ==
=== Healthcare ===
West Grey has one hospital in the Town of Durham: South Bruce Grey Health Centre, Durham. The hospital has an Emergency Department, laboratory, pharmacy, and diagnostic services. The West Grey Medical Clinic provides services by family doctors and allied health professionals. The Clinic is owned and managed by the Durham Hospital Foundation.

=== Fire ===
West Grey Fire Department has three stations: Durham, Ayton, and Neustadt.

=== Library ===
West Grey Public Library has three branches: Durham, Ayton, and Neustadt.

=== Police ===
Unlike most rural communities, West Grey maintains its own police force, the West Grey Police Service with headquarters in the Town of Durham.

=== Transit ===
GOST (Guelph Owen Sound Transportation) is a public transportation service connecting people from Owen Sound to Guelph along Highway 10 with a stop in Durham.

Saugeen Mobility and Regional Transit (SMART) provides accessible transportation for people who cannot travel by conventional transit or taxi.

== Education ==
West Grey has three elementary schools: Normanby Community School, Spruce Ridge Community School, and St. Peter's and St. Paul's Catholic School. Public school education is managed by the Bluewater and District School Board and Catholic schools are managed by the Bruce-Grey Catholic School Board.

== See also ==
- List of townships in Ontario
