= Teeswater River =

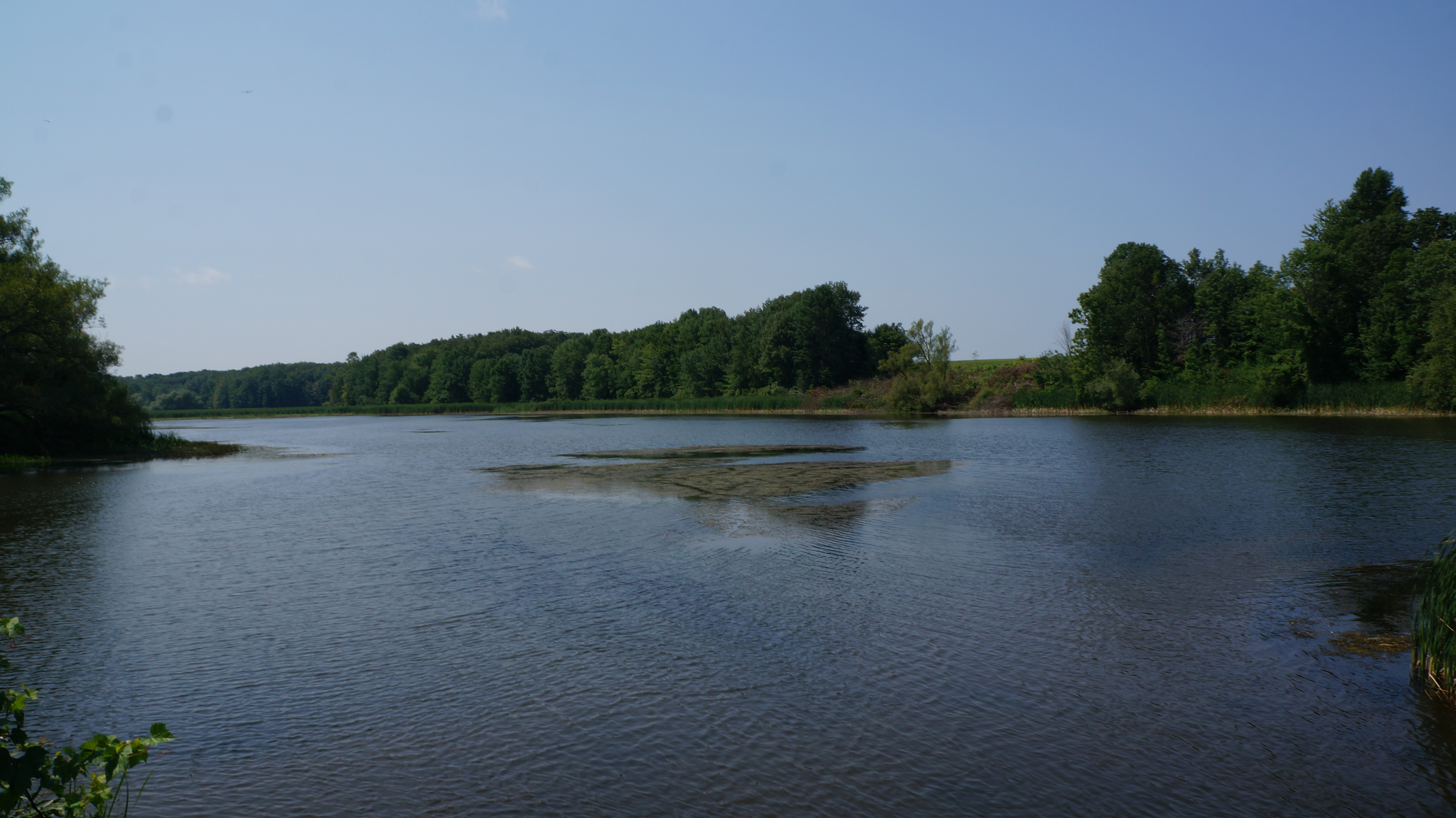
- Cargill Mill Pond along the Teeswater River

- Location of the mouth of the Teeswater River in southern Ontario
- Etymology: Named after the River Tees in England

Location
- Country: Canada
- Province: Ontario
- Region: Southwestern Ontario
- County: Bruce
- Municipalities: Arran–Elderslie, Brockton, South Bruce

Physical characteristics
- Source
  - location: Bruce County
  - coordinates: 43°58′28″N 81°05′46″W
  - elevation: 377 m (1,237 ft)
- Mouth: Saugeen River
  - location: Arran–Elderslie
  - coordinates: 44°18′24″N 81°16′23″W
  - elevation: 214 m (702 ft)
- Length: 75 km (47 mi)
- Basin size: 683 km^{2} (264 sq mi)
- Discharge
  - average: 11 m^{3}/s (390 cu ft/s)
  - minimum: 0.63 m^{3}/s (22 cu ft/s)

Basin features
- River system: Great Lakes Basin

The Teeswater River is a river in the municipalities of Arran–Elderslie, Brockton and South Bruce in Bruce County in Southwestern Ontario, Canada. It is in the Great Lakes Basin and empties into the Saugeen River at Paisley, Ontario.

The community of Teeswater is located on the river.

The river was named after the River Tees in England.

Map showing the Teeswater River, part of the Saugeen River basin in Bruce County, Ontario. The orange line shows the drainage basin of the river system.

== Sources ==
- Map 4 (PDF) (Map). 1 : 700,000. Official road map of Ontario. Ministry of Transportation of Ontario. 2012-01-01.
- Restructured municipalities - Ontario map #6 (Map). Restructuring Maps of Ontario. Ontario Ministry of Municipal Affairs and Housing. 2006. Archived from the original on 2021-02-24.

== See also ==
- List of rivers of Ontario
