= Beatty Saugeen River =

- Location of the mouth of the Beatty Saugeen River in southern Ontario

Location
- Country: Canada
- Province: Ontario
- Region: Southwestern Ontario
- County: Grey
- Municipalities: Hanover; West Grey; Southgate

Physical characteristics
- Source: Woods
  - location: Boothville
  - coordinates: 44°07′38″N 80°36′38″W
  - elevation: 484 m (1,588 ft)
- Mouth: South Saugeen River
  - location: Hanover
  - coordinates: 44°08′04″N 81°01′33″W
  - elevation: 261 m (856 ft)
- Length: 46 km (29 mi)
- Basin size: 274 km^{2} (106 sq mi)
- Discharge
  - average: 5.7 m^{3}/s (200 cu ft/s)

Basin features
- Progression: Beatty Saugeen River–South Saugeen River–Saugeen River–Lake Huron
- River system: Saugeen River

The Beatty Saugeen River is a river in the Saugeen River and Lake Huron drainage basins in Grey County, southwestern Ontario, Canada. It is a tributary of the South Saugeen River which is itself a tributary of the Saugeen River.

== Course ==
The river begins in a woods 2 kilometres (1.2 mi) southeast of the community of Boothville in the township of Southgate. It flows west, to the north of the community of Dromore, then southwest, passing to the north of the community of Yeovil. The river heads west, over Holstein Dam at the community of Holstein, and under Ontario Highway 6 south of the community of Orchardville. The Beatty Saugeen turns northwest, passing to the south of the community of Hampden in the township of West Grey, before reaching its mouth at the South Saugeen River on the south side of the town of Hanover.

The river is about 46 kilometres (29 mi) long with a drainage basin of 274 square kilometres (106 sq mi) and average gradient of 4.5 metres per kilometre (23.8 ft per mile).

== Geology ==
The headwaters of the river are in the Dundalk Till plain, and the remainder of the river in the Horseshoe Moraine and the Teeswater Drumlin field.

== Ecology ==
There are four monitoring stations in the Beatty Saugeen drainage basin: two for Benthic zone animals, one for surface water quality, and one combined. There are two rare species: the Delta-spotted spiketail and the Hart's Tongue Fern.

== See also ==
- List of rivers of Ontario

== Sources ==
- "Beatty Saugeen River". Geographical Names Data Base. Natural Resources Canada.
- "Topographic Map sheets 41A2, 41A3". Atlas of Canada. Natural Resources Canada. 2010-02-04. Archived from the original on 3 August 2010.
- "Beatty Saugeen River Watershed Report Card" (PDF). Saugeen Conservation. 2008.
