= Cedarville, Ontario =

Cedarville may refer to the following places in the Canadian province of Ontario:

- Cedarville, Grey County, Ontario
- Cedarville, Simcoe County, Ontario
