= Aberdeen, Ontario =

Aberdeen, Ontario can mean the following places:

- Aberdeen, Algoma District, Ontario, a geographic township within Unorganized North Algoma District
- Aberdeen, Grey County, Ontario
- Aberdeen, Prescott and Russell County, Ontario
