= Bethel, Ontario =

Bethel, Ontario may refer to:

- Bethel, Grey County, Ontario
- Bethel, Leeds and Grenville United Counties, Ontario
- Bethel, Niagara Regional Municipality, Ontario
- Bethel, Prince Edward County, Ontario
- Bethel, Kawartha Lakes, Ontario
