= Wareham, Ontario =

Coordinates: 44.249°N 80.408°W

Location of Wareham in Ontario

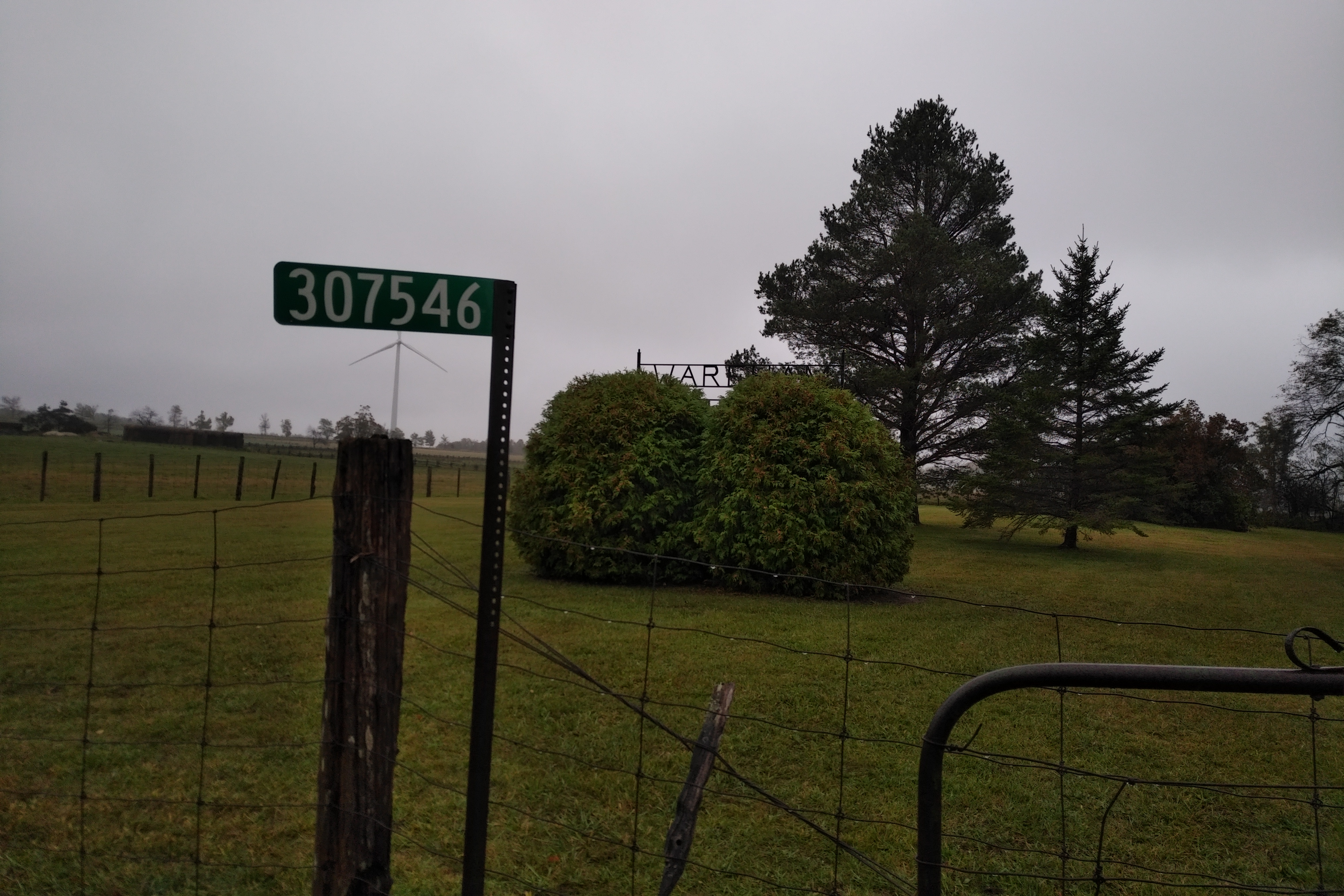

Wareham is a community in Grey County, Ontario. It is about 80 km northwest of Brampton, Ontario and about 60 km west of Barrie, Ontario. It is south of The Blue Mountains, Ontario and of the Grey Highlands.

Wareham is close to the Osprey Wetland Conservation Lands. Both the Saugeen Valley Conservation Authority and the Nottawasaga Valley Conservation Authority bought land here to protect the headwaters of several important rivers. The Osprey Wetlands are in the headwaters of the Saugeen River, as well as the Grand, the Beaver of Grey County, the Mad, and a tributary of the Nottawasaga River. This Wetland is a raised bog.

" Wareham as a community dates back to roughly the European Settlement of this area, about the 1850s. A branch of the Saugeen River runs through the centre of Wareham - and was the reason for settlement here. (The current crossroads of Centre Line A and Sideroad 41.) Originally there were three small water mills grouped around this corner. Remains of one of the largest of these, in the form of poured concrete bracketing the river, can be found to the SE, upstream from the intersection. The Hamlet of Wareham originally included a general store (now the location of the Church Shed / Wareham Forge) on the NW corner, and a blacksmith's shop on the NE corner. A red brick church, located about 50 m to the west on Centre Line, replaced the original wooden structure on the Davison farm about a mile east of the current location, about 1930. The original wood frame school house is located on the east side of SR 41, about 150 m south. (Both the church and the schoolhouse are now private residences.) "

It is the home of Darrell Markewitz, an artisan blacksmith who designed the living history program for L'Anse aux Meadows, Newfoundland for Parks Canada. The Wareham Forge has been in operation since 1992 (the old 'Wareham Church Shed' building).
