= CFPS-FM =

Radio station in Port Elgin, Ontario, Canada

Coordinates: 44°18′29″N 81°31′51″W

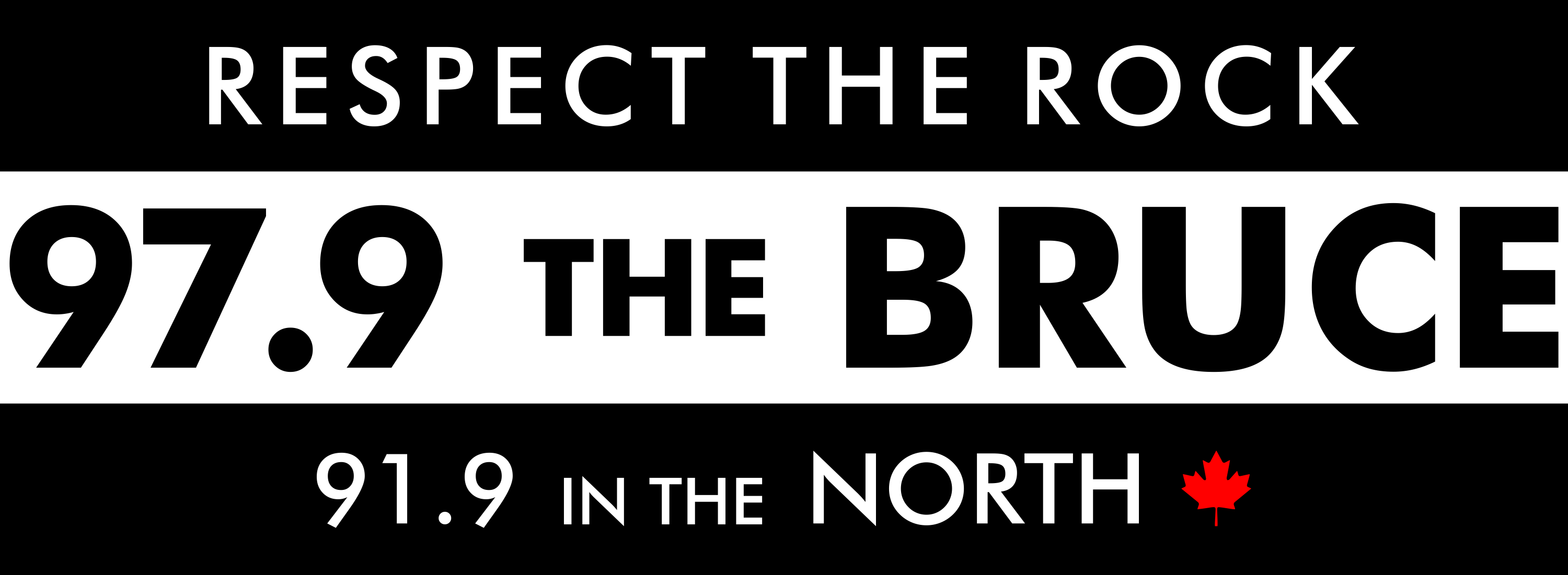
- Port Elgin, Ontario; Canada
- Frequency: 97.9 MHz
- Branding: 97.9 The Bruce

Programming
- Language: English
- Format: Active rock

Ownership
- Owner: Bayshore Broadcasting
- Sister stations: CISO-FM, CFDC-FM, CHGB-FM, CHWC-FM

History
- First air date: June 21, 1978
- Former frequencies: 1490 kHz (1978–2005)
- Call sign meaning: Port Elgin and Southampton (broadcast area)

Technical information
- Class: B1
- ERP: 3.8 kW average; 8.95 kW peak
- HAAT: 135 metres (443 ft)

Links
- Website: rockthebruce.ca

CFPS-FM is a Canadian radio station in Port Elgin, Ontario, broadcasting at 97.9 FM, with an active rock format with the on-air branding 97.9 The Bruce.

The station originally began broadcasting on the AM band at 1490 kHz on June 21, 1978. CFPS was launched by its sister station, CFOS in Owen Sound, as a semi-satellite radio station. On February 17, 2005, Bayshore Broadcasting received approval to convert CFPS from the AM band to the FM band at 97.9 MHz. The station was launched on 97.9 FM on May 20, 2005, as 98 The Beach and the old AM signal signed off the same day. Over the years, the station aired a variety of formats such as adult contemporary.

CFOS and CFPS are owned by Bayshore Broadcasting.

On December 2, 2019, Bayshore applied to add a new FM transmitter at Tobermory to rebroadcast the programming of CFPS-FM. On July 23, 2020, the CRTC approved Bayshore's application to operate a new FM transmitter at 91.9 MHz in Tobermory with the call sign CFPS-FM-1. The new transmitter will also offer local programming for Tobermory, and its original branding was to be 92 The Wave. On May 17, 2021, Bayshore Broadcasting launched its new repeater in Tobermory and changed its format to an active rock format as 97.9 The Bruce, 91.9 in the North with its slogan, "Respect The Rock".

== Former logos ==
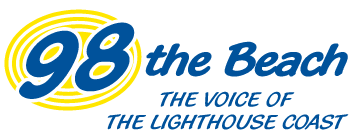

== Transmitters ==
Rebroadcasters of CFPS-FM
| City of licence | Identifier | Frequency | Power | Class | RECNet | CRTC Decision |
|---|---|---|---|---|---|---|
| Tobermory | CFPS-FM-1 | 91.9 FM | 3,254 watts | A | Query | 2020-232 |

On November 18, 2021, the CRTC approved Bayshore Broadcasting's application to relocate the transmitter for CFPS-FM-1 91.9 in Tobermory, a rebroadcaster of CFPS-FM Port Elgin. The original tower site is no longer available. Power will decrease from 3,254 to 1,600 watts. Antenna height will rise from 81.5 to 116.6 metres (EHAAT). The radiation pattern will remain directional.

On November 23, 2022, dignitaries from Bayshore Broadcasting and the Municipality of Northern Bruce Peninsula gathered on November 23 for a ribbon-cutting to officially launch two new radio stations that will launch on 91.9 FM and a new tourism station CIBP-FM at 103.7 FM (later changed to 104.3 FM).

On January 10, 2023, at 9:00 am, Bayshore flipped the switch on the two new stations, 91.9 FM the Bruce a repeater of CFPS-FM 97.9 Port Elgin and 104.3 FM a tourism station bringing the first radio service online directly serving Tobermory.

The 91.9 CFPS-FM-1 repeater in Tobermory can also be heard on parts of Manitoulin Island.

== Notes ==
On December 13, 1984, the CRTC approved a number of applications for a number of AM radio stations across Ontario including CFPS Port Elgin to increase their nighttime power from 250 watts to 1,000 watts.
