= Allenford =

Allenford may refer to:

- Allenford, Ontario
- Justine Allenford
- Roger Allenford
