= Vesta Creek (Ontario) =

Vesta Creek ruisseau Vesta
- Location of the mouth of the creek in Southern Ontario

Location
- Country: Canada
- Province: Ontario
- Region: Southwestern Ontario
- County: Bruce County
- Municipalities: Arran–Elderslie; Brockton

Physical characteristics
- Source: Confluence of two unnamed streams
  - location: Brockton
  - coordinates: 44°16′42″N 81°06′04″W
  - elevation: 260 m (850 ft)
- Mouth: Saugeen River
  - location: Arran–Elderslie
  - coordinates: 44°17′14″N 81°14′39″W
  - elevation: 217 m (712 ft)

Basin features
- Progression: Vesta Creek–Saugeen River–Lake Huron
- River system: Lake Huron drainage basin

Vesta Creek (French: ruisseau Vesta) is a stream in the municipalities of Arran–Elderslie and Brockton, Bruce County in Southwestern Ontario, Canada. It is in the Lake Huron drainage basin and is a right tributary of the Saugeen River.

== Course ==
Vesta Creek begins in Brockton at the confluence of two unnamed streams at an elevation of 260 metres (850 ft) and heads northwest, passes under Bruce County Road 19 and enters Arran–Elderslie. It turns west, flows to the north of the settlement of Vesta, then again heads northwest, and reaches its mouth as a right tributary of the Saugeen River at an elevation of 217 metres (712 ft). The Saugeen River flows to Lake Huron.
