= Williamsford, Ontario =

Williamsford
- Village
- Location within Grey County Location within Southern Ontario
- Coordinates: 44°22′46″N 80°52′18″W
- Country: Canada
- Province: Ontario
- County: Grey
- Township municipality: Chatsworth
- Surveyed: 1858

Government
  - Type: Unincorporated
- Time zone: UTC-5 (EST)
  - Summer (DST): UTC-4 (EDT)
- Postal code: N0H 2V0

Williamsford is a village on the North Saugeen River in Grey County, Ontario, Canada (Chatsworth Township). It has a general store, Pie Company, post office, bookstore and restaurant housed in a historic grain mill. A small dam controls the North Saugeen River. It has several churches, and a community cemetery. It is located on Highway 6 between Durham and Owen Sound.

The village of Williamsford was first surveyed in 1858 comprising 400 acres in preparation for a railway which was to run from Toronto to Owen Sound. Each township was to contribute $40,000 to its construction. The post office was built in 1847 and the general store was built in the late 1800s.

== Recreation ==
At the south end of the village sits the community centre grounds. The grounds contain a playground, a baseball diamond and a newly built curling rink. The curling rink which was completed in 2010 consists of a lounge and two rinks.

The community was previously served by a hockey arena with the original attached curling rink. The arena was planned in 1954 and opened officially in 1956 and was torn down in 2008.

== Transportation ==
Ontario Highway 6 passes through the Williamsford.

== See also ==
- Royal eponyms in Canada
