= CIXK-FM =

Radio station in Owen Sound, Ontario

Coordinates: 44°30′44″N 80°57′13″W

- Owen Sound, Ontario; Canada
- Broadcast area: Grey County
- Frequency: 106.5 MHz
- Branding: Mix 106.5

Programming
- Format: Hot adult contemporary

Ownership
- Owner: Bayshore Broadcasting
- Sister stations: CFOS-FM, CKYC-FM

History
- First air date: January 3, 1989

Technical information
- Class: C1
- ERP: 28 kW
- HAAT: 189.6 metres (622 ft)

Links
- Webcast: Listen Live
- Website: mix1065.ca

CIXK-FM, branded as Mix 106.5, is a Canadian FM radio station, broadcasting from studios on 9th Street East in downtown Owen Sound, Ontario. CIXK is the most listened to radio station in Owen Sound.

== History ==
In 1987, Bayshore Broadcasting Corp., owner of 560 CFOS, filed an application with the CRTC for a new FM station to serve Owen Sound. The application was approved by the CRTC on October 26 the same year. Transmitter testing at 106.5 MHz began in late 1988 and was launched on January 3, 1989 as K106.5.

In the 1990s CIXK-FM aired a mix of acoustic rock and country crossover format using the slogan "The mix that kicks". Over the years, different slogans were used with the Mix 106.5 or Mix 106 branding.

Bayshore Broadcasting launched its new FM sister station, CKYC-FM in 2001 with a country format.

On September 30, 2010, CKYC-FM and sister station CIXK-FM received CRTC approval to change their authorized contours.

Until 2016, unlike the typical Canadian hot AC station which plays mainly pop and rhythmic music, CIXK aired more of a rock adult contemporary/adult hits format, with a mix of current rock-oriented hot AC hits and classic hits dating back to the 1970s.

In May 2016, CIXK-FM adjusted its format and branding to a more traditional hot adult contemporary format, adopting the slogan "Today's HIT Music".
