= Paisley, Ontario =

Paisley
- Community
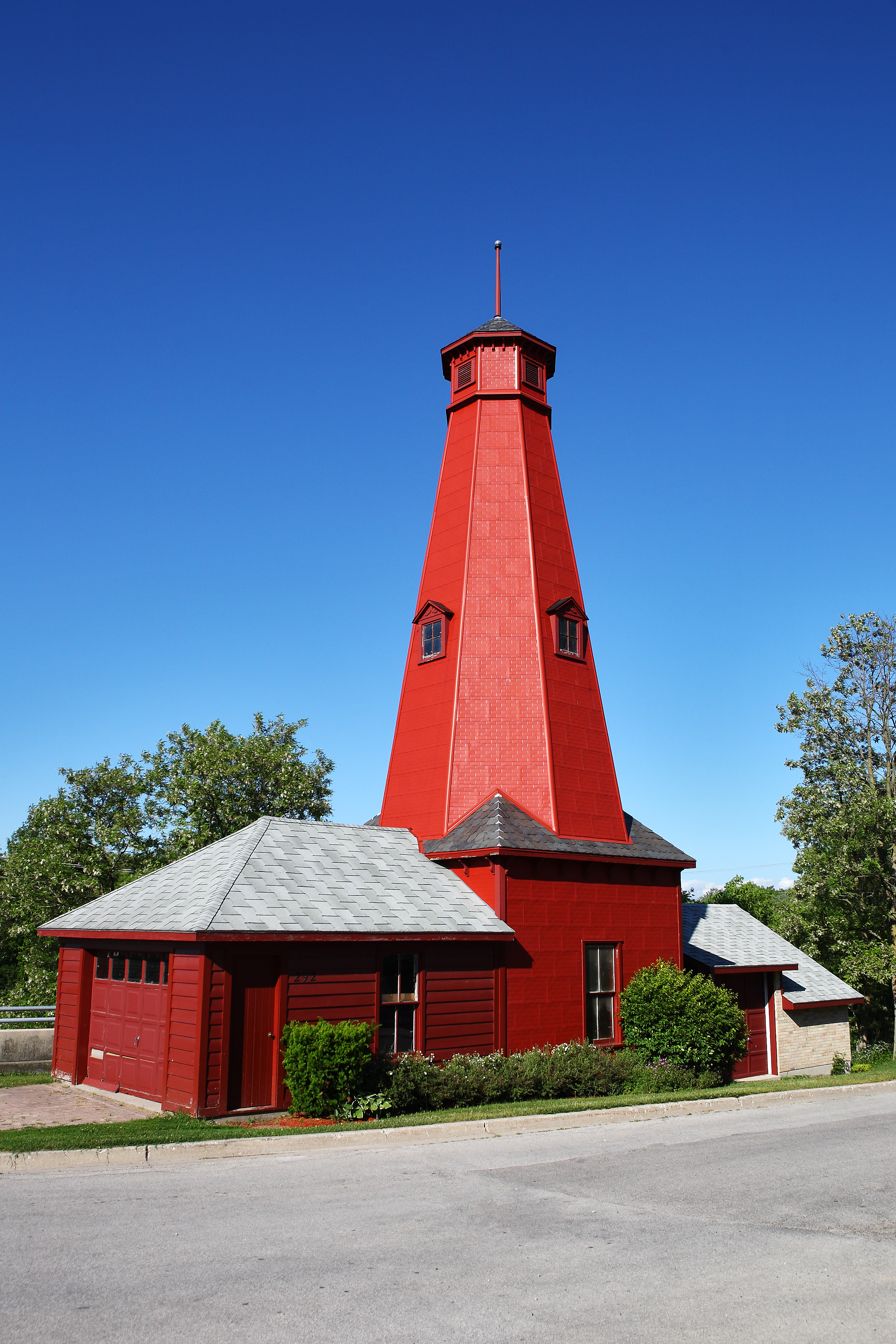
- Historic Hose Tower in Paisley, built in 1891
- Etymology: Named after Paisley, Renfrewshire
- Location in southern Ontario
- Coordinates: 44°18′27″N 81°16′27″W
- Country: Canada
- Province: Ontario
- County: Bruce County
- Municipality: Arran–Elderslie
- First settled: 1851
- Elevation: 217 m (712 ft)
- Time zone: UTC-5 (Eastern Time Zone)
  - Summer (DST): UTC-4 (Eastern Time Zone)
- Postal code: N0G 2N0
- Area codes: 519, 226, 548
- CGNDB key: FAXPT

Paisley is an unincorporated community and village in the municipality of Arran–Elderslie, Bruce County in Southwestern Ontario, Canada. Paisley is defined by its position at the confluence of the Saugeen River and the Teeswater River, and at the junction of Bruce Roads 1, 11, and 3.

== History ==
Paisley began with the settlement in 1851 of Simon Orchard and Samuel T. Rowe at the site of what would become the village of Paisley, later that year John Valentine, built a sawmill here. The village was named in 1856 after Paisley, Renfrewshire in Scotland.

== Media ==
- Cable television is provided by Eastlink TV and Bruce Telecom
- CKNX-FM 101.7 "The One" - local, regional and national news and adult contemporary music
- CIBU-FM 94.5 "The Bull" - local, regional and national news and classic rock music
- CFPS-FM 97.9 "The Bruce" - rock music

== Bus Transportation ==
- Ross Young Bus Lines (buses from Tiverton, Ontario) (also for Paisley Central School students)

== Notable persons ==
- Alexander James McPhail, an agricultural reformer, was born in Paisley in 1883.
- Marshall Kay, a paleontologist prominently involved with the study of continental drift, was born in Paisley in 1904.
- Isabella Valancy Crawford, a prolific Canadian author, lived in Paisley between 1857 and 1861.

== Climate ==
Climate data for Paisley
Month	Jan	Feb	Mar	Apr	May	Jun	Jul	Aug	Sep	Oct	Nov	Dec	Year
Record high °C (°F)	12.2 (54.0)	14.0 (57.2)	23.0 (73.4)	28.5 (83.3)	32.2 (90.0)	33.9 (93.0)	34.5 (94.1)	35.0 (95.0)	32.8 (91.0)	27.2 (81.0)	21.0 (69.8)	18.5 (65.3)	35.0 (95.0)
Mean daily maximum °C (°F)	−3.2 (26.2)	−2.6 (27.3)	2.5 (36.5)	10.2 (50.4)	17.8 (64.0)	22.1 (71.8)	25.0 (77.0)	24.0 (75.2)	19.5 (67.1)	12.8 (55.0)	5.9 (42.6)	−0.5 (31.1)	11.1 (52.0)
Daily mean °C (°F)	−7 (19)	−6.9 (19.6)	−2.2 (28.0)	5.1 (41.2)	11.5 (52.7)	15.9 (60.6)	18.9 (66.0)	18.2 (64.8)	14.1 (57.4)	8.2 (46.8)	2.5 (36.5)	−3.8 (25.2)	6.2 (43.2)
Mean daily minimum °C (°F)	−10.7 (12.7)	−11.3 (11.7)	−6.8 (19.8)	0.1 (32.2)	5.2 (41.4)	9.6 (49.3)	12.7 (54.9)	12.4 (54.3)	8.8 (47.8)	3.5 (38.3)	−0.9 (30.4)	−7.1 (19.2)	1.3 (34.3)
Record low °C (°F)	−37.2 (−35.0)	−40.0 (−40.0)	−33.0 (−27.4)	−18.9 (−2.0)	−6.1 (21.0)	−2.2 (28.0)	2.2 (36.0)	0 (32)	−5.5 (22.1)	−8.3 (17.1)	−17.5 (0.5)	−31 (−24)	−40 (−40)
Average precipitation mm (inches)	144 (5.7)	93 (3.7)	88.4 (3.48)	70.3 (2.77)	75.5 (2.97)	76.4 (3.01)	73.9 (2.91)	101.2 (3.98)	111 (4.4)	98.2 (3.87)	110.7 (4.36)	150 (5.9)	1,192.7 (46.96)
Average rainfall mm (inches)	18.4 (0.72)	23.4 (0.92)	50.7 (2.00)	60.1 (2.37)	75.4 (2.97)	76.4 (3.01)	73.9 (2.91)	101.2 (3.98)	111 (4.4)	97.2 (3.83)	74.3 (2.93)	40.6 (1.60)	802.6 (31.60)
Average snowfall cm (inches)	125.7 (49.5)	69.6 (27.4)	37.7 (14.8)	10.3 (4.1)	0.1 (0.0)	0 (0)	0 (0)	0 (0)	0 (0)	1 (0.4)	36.4 (14.3)	109.4 (43.1)	390.1 (153.6)
Source: Environment Canada
