= Osprey, Ontario =

Ontarian township community

Coordinates: 44.323°N 80.336°W

Location of Osprey in Ontario

Osprey was a township community in Grey County, Ontario. In 2001 it was amalgamated with the village of Markdale and the townships of Euphrasia and Artemesia to form the Municipality of Grey Highlands.
