= CKYC-FM =

Radio station in Owen Sound, Ontario

Coordinates: 44°30′44″N 80°57′13″W

- Owen Sound, Ontario; Canada
- Broadcast area: Grey County
- Frequency: 93.7 MHz
- Branding: Country 93

Programming
- Format: Country

Ownership
- Owner: Bayshore Broadcasting
- Sister stations: CFOS-FM, CIXK-FM

History
- First air date: September 4, 2001
- Call sign meaning: Your Country

Technical information
- Class: B
- ERP: 22 kW
- HAAT: 214 metres (702 ft)

Links
- Webcast: Listen Live
- Website: country93.ca

CKYC-FM is a Canadian radio station broadcasting at 93.7 FM in Owen Sound, Ontario. The station features a country format branded as Country 93, catering primarily to Grey-Bruce Counties as well as northern parts of Huron and Wellington Counties. The station is known for its active support of local country music, as well as bringing national and international country music acts to Grey and Bruce counties. CKYC was a former callsign of a radio station in Toronto, which is known today as CHKT.

== History ==
On March 19, 2001, Bayshore Broadcasting, the owners of CFOS and CIXK-FM, received CRTC approval to operate a new FM radio station in Owen Sound on the frequency 93.7 MHz. The new station would broadcast a country format. The station was launched on September 4, 2001.

On September 30, 2010, CKYC-FM and its sister station CIXK-FM received CRTC approval to change their authorized contours.
