= CFOS-FM =

Radio station in Owen Sound, Ontario, Canada

Coordinates: 44.56609°N 80.94146°W

- Owen Sound, Ontario; Canada
- Broadcast area: Grey County
- Frequency: 89.3 MHz
- Branding: 89.3 CFOS FM

Programming
- Format: Full service talk/oldies/classic hits
- Affiliations: Owen Sound Attack

Ownership
- Owner: Bayshore Broadcasting
- Sister stations: CIXK-FM, CKYC-FM

History
- First air date: March 1, 1940
- Former frequencies: 1370 kHz (1940–1941); 1400 kHz (1941–1947); 1470 kHz (1947–1958); 560 kHz (1958–2025)
- Call sign meaning: OS for Owen Sound

Technical information
- Class: B1
- Power: 1,500 watts

Links
- Webcast: Listen Live
- Website: 893cfos.ca

CFOS-FM is an FM radio station broadcasting from Owen Sound, Ontario, Canada. The format is oldies, classic adult contemporary, classic hits music, and news (plus an adult standards/nostalgic music show, "Remember When", several nights a week from 8-11 p.m.), and is branded as 89.3 CFOS. CFOS is owned and operated by Bayshore Broadcasting of Owen Sound.

== History ==
The station originally began broadcasting on March 1, 1940 on 1370 kHz, and changed frequencies to 1400 kHz on March 29, 1941 and again to 1470 kHz in 1947. In 1958, CFOS again changed frequencies from 1470 to its current frequency of 560 kHz.

CFOS was a network affiliate of CBC Radio's Dominion Network until 1962. The station was then affiliated with the main CBC Radio network for two decades until CBCB-FM launched in 1983.

On June 21, 1978, CFOS opened a semi-satellite station CFPS at Port Elgin. CFPS was given approval by the Canadian Radio-television and Telecommunications Commission (CRTC) in 2005 to convert to 97.9 MHz.

In 1994, CFOS applied to operate a new rebroadcaster at Collingwood on the frequency 1610 kHz. That application was denied on March 8, 1995.

In 2007, CFOS applied to add an FM signal on 96.1 MHz to rebroadcast the AM signal; the CRTC denied this application in February 2008.

On January 17, 2024, Bayshore Broadcasting applied to the CRTC to convert CFOS to 89.3 MHz (channel 207B1) with an effective radiated power (ERP) of 1,500 watts (non-directional antenna with an effective height of antenna above average terrain EHAAT of 214 metres). Bayshore Broadcasting received CRTC approval to move CFOS from the AM band to the FM band on October 31, 2024.

The station began a transitional simulcast on FM on August 1, 2025; the AM signal continued broadcasting until October, 31, 2025.
