= Priceville, Ontario =

Priceville
- Village
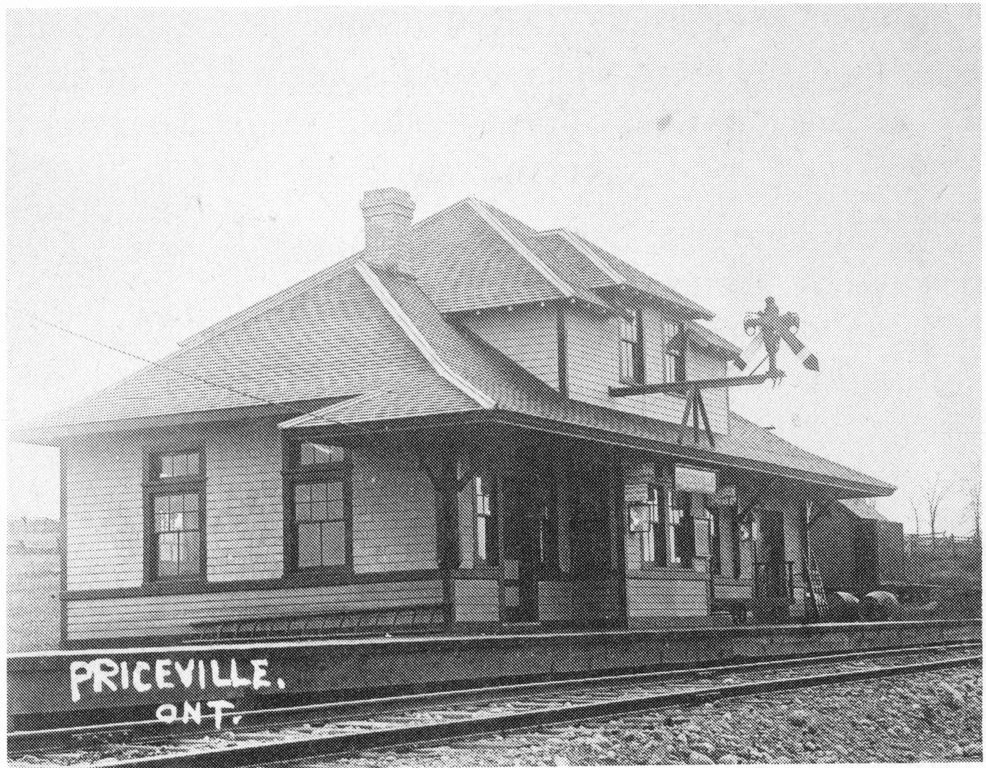
- c. 1908 CPR Railway station in Priceville, 1914

- Location of Priceville in Ontario.
- Coordinates: 44.210019°N 80.626602°W
- Country: Canada
- Province: Ontario
- County: Grey County
- Municipality: Grey Highlands

Priceville is a village in the southwest corner of the Municipality of Grey Highlands, Grey County, Ontario, Canada. It is on the Saugeen River on Grey Road 4, east of Durham and southwest of Flesherton.

== History ==
The first inhabitants were African Americans, who established a small settlement along Old Durham Road (now Durham Road B) east of the village. Here they built a log school, a log church and established a cemetery. Many of these Black inhabitants later moved to Collingwood, Oro, or Owen Sound. All that remains to commemorate this community is a cairn and refurbished grave site at the intersection of County Road 14 and Durham Road B some three kilometers east of Priceville. The discovery and refurbishment of this cemetery is documented in the 2000 National Film Board of Canada film, Speakers for the Dead, co-directed by Jennifer Holness and David Sutherland (now Sudz Sutherland).

The 1908 CPR Priceville Station was located on the CPR Walkerton Sub-division and formerly Walkerton Lucknow Railway. The station was relocated off the abandoned line and is now located on 405019 Grey County Road 4 as a private residence.

Gaelic-speaking Scottish people arrived around 1850. Almost all the early headstones in the pioneer cemetery commemorate people of Scottish origin. Some of these settlers intermarried with the black community.

Amenities in Priceville include a post office; a riverside park with a picnic area, swimming and fishing opportunities, and a canoe and kayak launch; a toboggan hill; a sports park; an outdoor skating rink; and a children's playground. Events that attract many visitors include a biennial Santa Claus parade, an annual antique car and tractor show, and a July 1 Canada Day celebration with a concert and fireworks.
