= CHGB-FM =

Radio station in Wasaga Beach, Ontario

Coordinates: 44°28′40″N 80°00′50″W

- Wasaga Beach, Ontario; Canada
- Broadcast area: Georgian Triangle
- Frequency: 97.7 MHz
- Branding: 97.7 Max FM

Programming
- Language: English
- Format: Classic hits

Ownership
- Owner: Bayshore Broadcasting
- Sister stations: CISO-FM

History
- First air date: May 18, 2007

Technical information
- Class: A
- ERP: 700 watts
- HAAT: 100 metres (330 ft)

Links
- Webcast: Listen Live
- Website: 977maxfm.ca

CHGB-FM is a Canadian radio station of a classic hits music format at 97.7 FM in Wasaga Beach, Ontario. The station uses the on-air brand name 97.7 Max FM.

== History ==
The station was licensed by the CRTC in 2006 following a failed application in 2005, and began regular broadcasting on May 18, 2007. CHGB is owned by Bayshore Broadcasting.

In 2007, CHGB-FM began testing over the air on April 5 at 97.7 MHz. The station signed on the air on May 18, 2007 at 7:00 PM as 97.7 The Beach.

From 1938 to 1992, the call sign CHGB was used by Radio Lapocatière, CHGB 1310 in La Pocatière, Quebec. On April 23, 1992 at 7am, it moved to 97.5 FM and changed its call sign to CHOX-FM.

CHGB does target the signal area with newcomer sister station CISO-FM in Orillia, which airs an adult contemporary format. But due to CISO-FM having a stronger signal, a format flip would be more likely at CHGB-FM.

On January 15, 2015, Bayshore Broadcasting received CRTC approval to increase CHGB-FM's average effective radiated power (ERP) from 200 to 700 watts (maximum ERP from 347 to 700 watts) and changing the antenna's radiation pattern from directional to non-directional. All other technical parameters would remain unchanged.

After playing 97.7 Halloween FM stunt, on November 1, 2018, CHGB changed to their current classic hits format and branding as 97.7 Max FM with the best of the 70's 80's and 90's.

== Previous logos ==
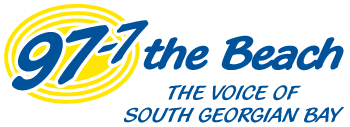
