= CISO-FM =

Radio station in Orillia, Ontario

Coordinates: 44°33′15″N 79°33′21″W

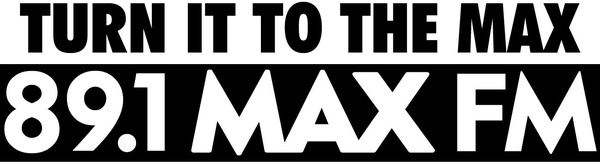
- Orillia, Ontario; Canada
- Broadcast area: Simcoe County
- Frequency: 89.1 MHz
- Branding: 89.1 Max FM

Programming
- Language: English
- Format: Modern rock

Ownership
- Owner: Bayshore Broadcasting
- Sister stations: CHGB-FM

History
- First air date: 2011
- Call sign meaning: Sunshine Orillia (former branding)

Technical information
- Class: A
- ERP: 2.5 kW
- HAAT: 154.1 metres (506 ft)

Links
- Webcast: Listen Live
- Website: 891maxfm.ca

CISO-FM is a Canadian radio station, which broadcasts a modern rock format at 89.1 MHz in Orillia, Ontario. The station is branded as 89.1 Max FM.

== History ==
Owned by Bayshore Broadcasting, the station received CRTC approval on June 1, 2009.

The station officially launched in February 2011 with an adult contemporary format branded as Sunshine 89.1.

On November 1, 2018, CISO-FM rebranded to 89.1 Max FM with a classic hits format playing the best of the 70's, 80's and 90's.

On May 17, 2019, the station changed its format to modern rock but retained its "Max FM" branding.
