= Southgate, Ontario =

Southgate
- Township (lower-tier)
- Township of Southgate
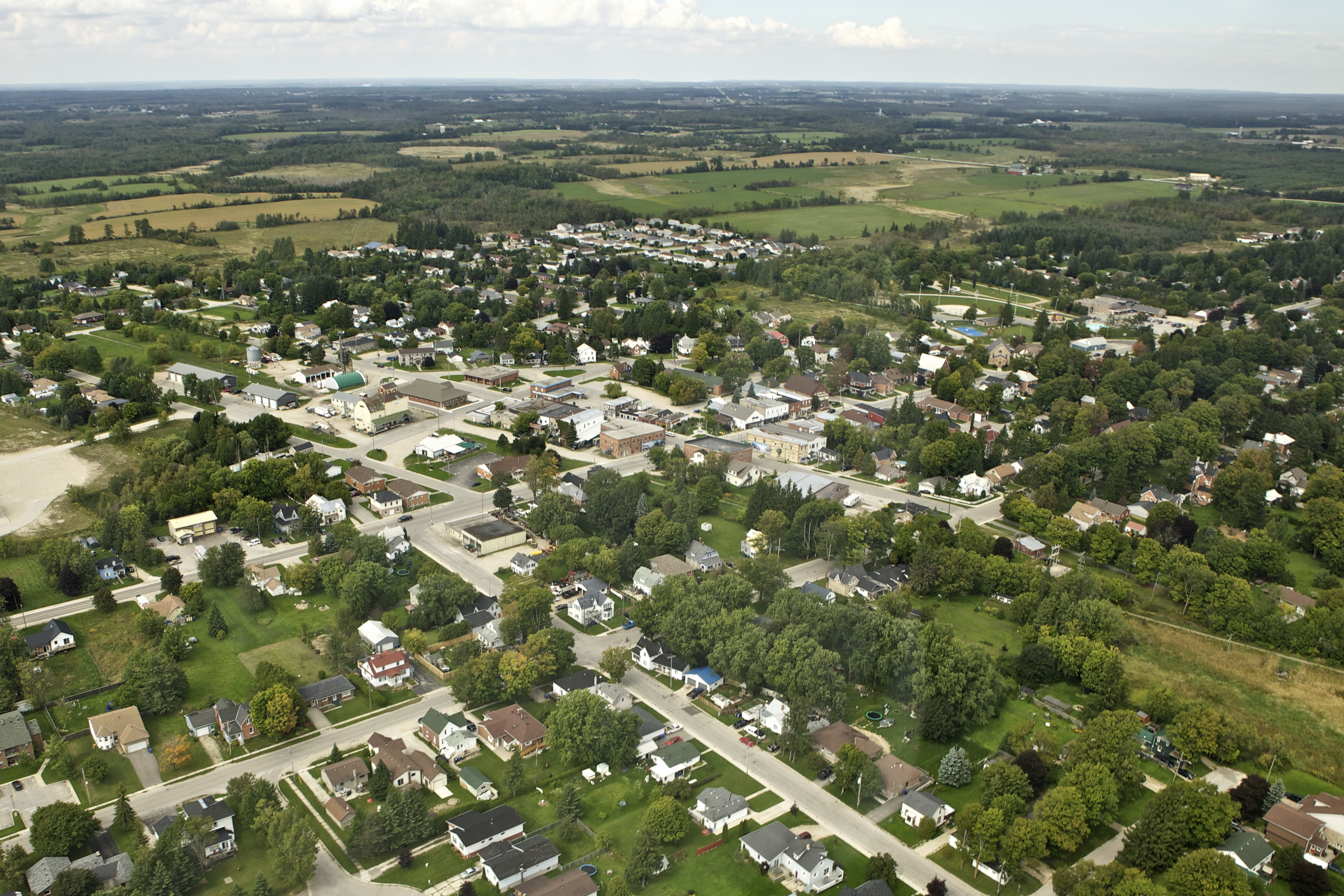
- Dundalk

- Location within Grey County Location within Southern Ontario
- Coordinates: 44°06′N 80°35′W
- Country: Canada
- Province: Ontario
- County: Grey
- Formed: January 1, 2000

Government
  - Mayor: Brian Milne
  - Fed. riding: Bruce—Grey—Owen Sound
  - Prov. riding: Bruce—Grey—Owen Sound

Area
  - Land: 643.08 km^{2} (248.29 sq mi)

Population (2021)
  - Total: 8,716
  - Density: 13.6/km^{2} (35/sq mi)
- Time zone: UTC-5 (EST)
  - Summer (DST): UTC-4 (EDT)
- Postal Code: N0C 1B0
- Area codes: 519, 226, 548
- Website: www.southgate.ca

Southgate is a township in southwestern Ontario, Canada, in the southeast corner of Grey County.

Southgate was formed on January 1, 2000, when the Village of Dundalk, the Township of Proton and the Township of Egremont were amalgamated. The headwaters of the South Saugeen, Beatty Saugeen and Grand Rivers are located in Southgate.

== Communities ==
Dundalk welcome sign.

The township comprises the communities of:

- Bethel
- Birdell
- Boothville
- Cedarville
- Conn
- Dromore
- Dundalk
- Egerton
- Gildale
- Holstein
- Hopeville
- Keldon
- Kingscote
- Landerkin
- Proton Station
- Robbtown
- Signet
- Swinton Park
- Tartan
- Thistle
- Varney
- Ventry
- Yeovil

The largest communities are Dundalk and Holstein

== Demographics ==
In the 2021 Census of Population conducted by Statistics Canada, Southgate had a population of 8,716 living in 3,017 of its 3,257 total private dwellings, a change of 18.5% from its 2016 population of 7,354. With a land area of 643.08 km^{2} (248.29 sq mi), it had a population density of 13.6/km^{2} (35.1/sq mi) in 2021.

Canada census – Southgate, Ontario community profile

	2021	2016	2011
Population	8,716 (+18.5% from 2016)	7,354 (+2.3% from 2011)	7,190 (+1.7% from 2006)
Land area	643.08 km^{2} (248.29 sq mi)	644.38 km^{2} (248.80 sq mi)	644.35 km^{2} (248.78 sq mi)
Population density	13.6/km^{2} (35/sq mi)	11.4/km^{2} (30/sq mi)	11.2/km^{2} (29/sq mi)
Median age	36.0 (M: 35.2, F: 36.4)	41.0 (M: 40.4, F: 41.5)
Private dwellings	3,257 (total) 3,017 (occupied)	2,987 (total)	2,921 (total)
Median household income	$85,000	$67,959

References: 2021 2016 2011

Historical census populations – Southgate, Ontario

Year	Pop.	±%
1996	6,449	—
2001	6,907	+7.1%
2006	7,167	+3.8%

Year	Pop.	±%
2011	7,190	+0.3%
2016	7,354	+2.3%
2021	8,716	+18.5%

Population counts are not adjusted for boundary changes.
Source: Statistics Canada

== Economy ==
Agriculture is the dominant sector of the economy in Southgate. Many of the farms in Southgate have secondary businesses on the farm to service the rural farm community. For the last 20 years, Mennonites have been purchasing farmland in Southgate and have expanded the land base available for agriculture. The supply of agricultural land is expanding in Southgate.

The industrial sector is concentrated in the Dundalk area. There are 30 small manufacturers in the rural area around Dundalk, mostly in metal fabrication. A large portion are located on Mennonite farms on the eastern side of Southgate. These manufacturers use CNC equipment such a laser cutters to produce a wide variety of metal parts and products.

The Township of Southgate has developed a 220 acres (89 ha) Eco Park which is 90% sold out. The Park has 2 industries involved in the environment sector: Lystek which produces liquid fertilizer and Gro-Bark which produces soil from compost and wood chips. There have been 6 land sales in the last 2 years. The companies that have purchased properties are planning to build industrial facilities. Currently 18 acres are available for industrial development.

Most of the commercial retail businesses are located in downtown Dundalk. There are over 30 businesses in the downtown and another 10 outside the downtown or near Hwy. 10.

The Tourism economy is growing in Southgate, focused on the many events held in Holstein and Dundalk. A new tourism experience was developed in 2016 called Butter Tarts & Buggies: Explore the Simpler Life in partnership with Wellington North, Minto, Mapleton and West Grey. It includes the Mennonite culture of Southgate with butter tarts and the local food experience.

== Culture and tourism ==
Southgate was settled in the 1850s as a farming area spreading from the settlement roads of Hwy 10 and Hwy 6. The original settlers were from England, Scotland, Ireland, Wales and other European countries. Soon after 2 rail lines were built running north–south near Hwy 10 through Dundalk and Proton Station and Hwy 6 through Holstein. The most recent arrivals in Southgate are Mennonites mostly from the Kitchener-Waterloo area. Southgate has several churches representing Catholic, Anglican, Protestant and Mennonite denominations.

Dundalk is the starting point of the Grey County CP Rail Trail, a multi-purpose trail which runs through downtown Dundalk on the old railline to Owen Sound. Dundalk is the hub of the regional ATV and snowmobile networks in the region.

The Highpoint Campground is a municipally owned campground in downtown Dundalk in Dundalk Memorial Park.

The village of Dundalk hosts many tourism events including the Dundalk Fair and Canadian Open Dance Competition, Horse Shows, Family Recreation Weekend, Automotive Swap-Meet & Flea Market and Santa Claus Parade.

The Dundalk Fair and Canadian Open Dance Competition is held the 2nd weekend of September. The Dance Competition includes step dancing, clogging, square dancing and group step dancing. The Fair is a traditional fall fair which has been held for over 160 years. It includes saddle horse shows, harness racing, demolition derby, tractor pulls, classic car show, garden tractor races, Ambassador of the Fair crowning, amusement rides and over a hundred competitions judging jam to livestock.

The village of Holstein hosts many events each year including: the Holstein Maplefest, a Canada Day Fireworks display, Holstein Santa Claus Parade and annual drama productions. Landmarks and businesses in Holstein are the Holstein General Store, Holstein Feed Mill, Holstein Park and Dam, Egremont Optimist's Community centre, Holstein Cenotaph, Knox Holstein Presbyterian Church and Egremont Community School. The Holstein Dam is on the Waterfalls of Grey County Tour.

Holstein's Maplefest is hosted at Love's Sugarbush the second weekend in April and has displays of pioneer activities, modern production of maple syrup, games, booths from local merchants, artists and local community groups and has live shows and children's entertainment.

Butter Tarts and Buggies is a new tourist attraction in Southgate, Wellington North, Minto, Mapleton and West Grey which features many of the Mennonite businesses in the Holstein area. A special feature of the Butter Tarts and Buggies is an authentic Mennonite horse drawn buggy ride through 2 Mennonite working farms and scenic backroads just outside Holstein.

Varney International Speedway is located in Varney on the western edge of Southgate. It is the only speedway in Ontario to feature a 33° high-bank asphalt racing surface.

== Infrastructure ==
The village of Dundalk is located along Highway 10 and is serviced with municipal water and sewers, natural gas (Enbridge), electricity (Hydro One) and cable (Eastlink).

The former rail line roadbed has become a snowmobile and ATV trail which is owned by Grey County.

== Education ==
Dundalk's three elementary schools are Egremont Community School, Dundalk & Proton Community School and Highpoint Community School. The high school is Grey Highlands Secondary School, which is located in the nearby town of Flesherton.

== Notable residents ==
- Agnes Campbell Macphail (March 24, 1890 – February 13, 1954) was the first woman to be elected to the Canadian House of Commons, and one of the first two women elected to the Legislative Assembly of Ontario.
- Samuel Lewis Honey - recipient of the Victoria Cross for actions during battle of the Canal du Nord during the First World War.
- Murray Calder - former Member of Parliament, camel owner, and classic military vehicle restoration enthusiast.

== See also ==
- List of townships in Ontario
