= Neustadt, Ontario =

Neustadt
- Unincorporated community
- The village sign as of 2008
- Interactive map of Neustadt
- Coordinates: 44.08°N 81°W
- Country: Canada
- Province: Ontario
- County: Grey
- Township: West Grey
- Established: 1856

Population (2016)
  - Total: 517
- Time zone: UTC-5 (EST)
  - Summer (DST): UTC-4 (EDT)
- Forward sortation area: N
- Area codes: 519 and 226

Neustadt is a community in the municipality of West Grey in Grey County in southern Ontario, Canada. The village is located south of Hanover on Grey Road 10 and north of Guelph, Ontario, and Kitchener, Ontario. Neustadt is a rural Ontario village with German roots and a village history associated with farming culture. In their April 2000 edition, Harrowsmith Magazine named Neustadt one of Canada's ten prettiest villages as evidenced by the historic 19th century Victorian farmhouses highlighting Gothic Revival architecture. Neustadt has also been featured in Country Living.

== History ==
The village's name, Neustadt, is of German origin (German pronunciation: [ˈnɔʏʃtat]) and it translates to “new town”. It was founded in 1856 by David Winkler, a settler from Germany. He purchased 400 acres from the government, laid out the town-site, dammed Meux Creek and completed a sawmill. A flour mill and grist mill were also erected near the dam the following year. Many other German-speaking settlers began arriving immediately.

David Winkler also became the founder of many other institutions. He opened the first post office in 1857, and acted as postmaster, a position he held until 1878. Later he became a Justice of the Peace and eventually, Reeve of Normanby Township. In 1870, Winkler lost a leg in a runaway horse accident and died seven years later. By 1901 the population was 466 and the village was firmly established as an agricultural service centre.

John Weinert, a saddle maker from Prussia, moved into Neustadt in 1859 and proceeded to establish a tannery on the north side of William Street. By 1861, he had added a boot and shoe factory and soon was supplying footwear to the settlers. As craftsman flocked to the area, Neustadt soon attracted one Henry Huether, a German immigrant from Baden, Germany. Huether first constructed a wooden frame Brewery until a fire in 1859 destroyed it. The brewery was reconstructed in fieldstone and reopened in 1869. At that time, the population was 500, primarily German-speaking.

The brewery continued to be open and successful until 1916 when it became a creamery. For many years it remained empty, being used by several community groups as variously a dance hall and farmer's market, until 1997 when it was reopened as Neustadt Springs Brewery; which currently brews ten brands of beer.

In the early 1880s, the village saw its peak of development. The opening of a modern school and several new churches, businesses, and industries led to a growth in population. Years later, small businesses, farm equipment dealer, creameries, woolen mills, egg grading stations, some stores and later banks began to vanish. Each closure was critical to the village. Fewer attractions meant fewer visitors; the economy and population soon began to decline. John Diefenbaker, who would later become Prime Minister, was born here in 1895, but his family moved away in 1903.

In 2000, the Village of Neustadt with the Townships of Bentinck, Glenelg and Normanby agreed to form the Municipality of West Grey.

=== Historic sites ===
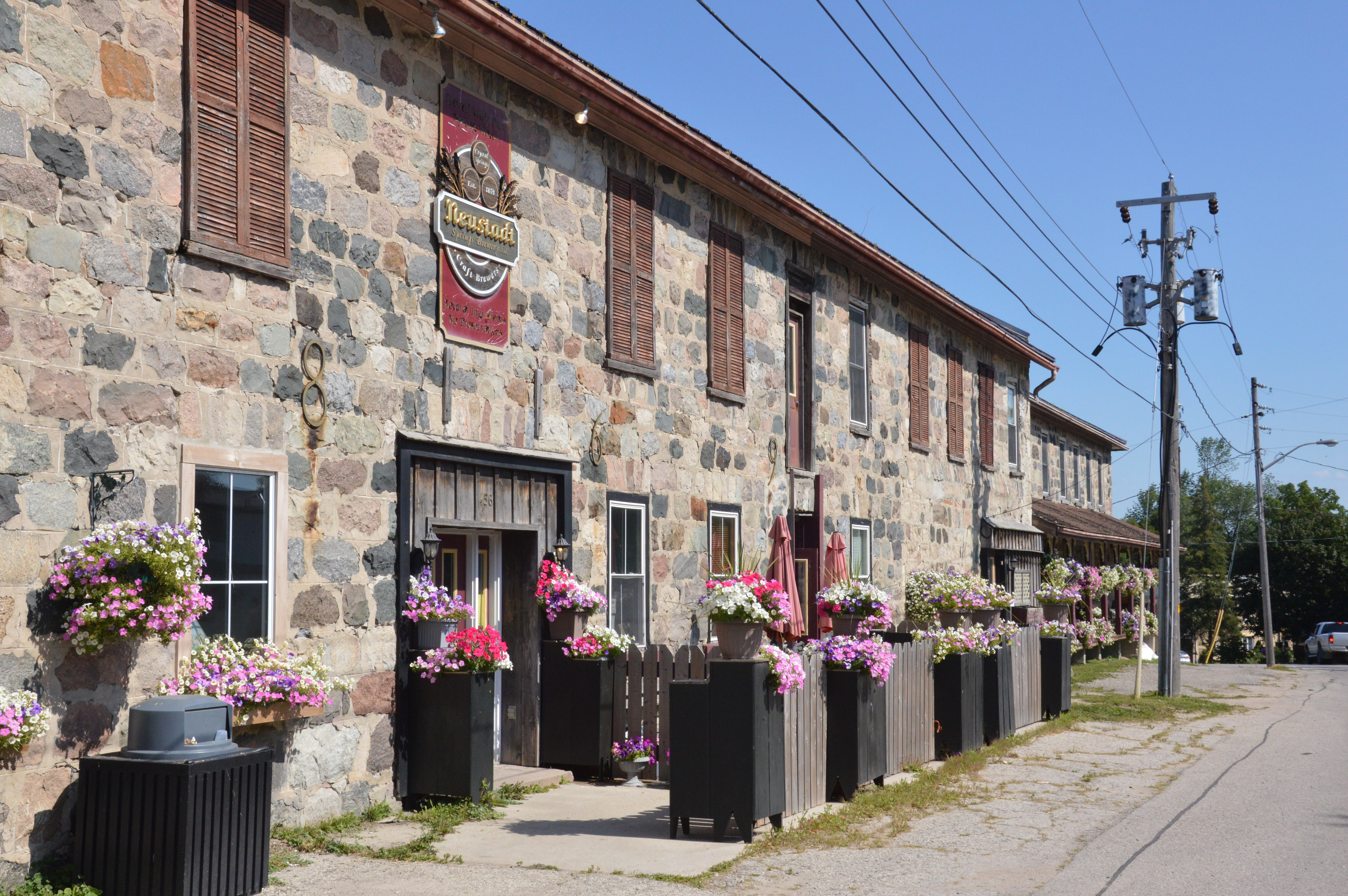
Neustadt Springs Brewery

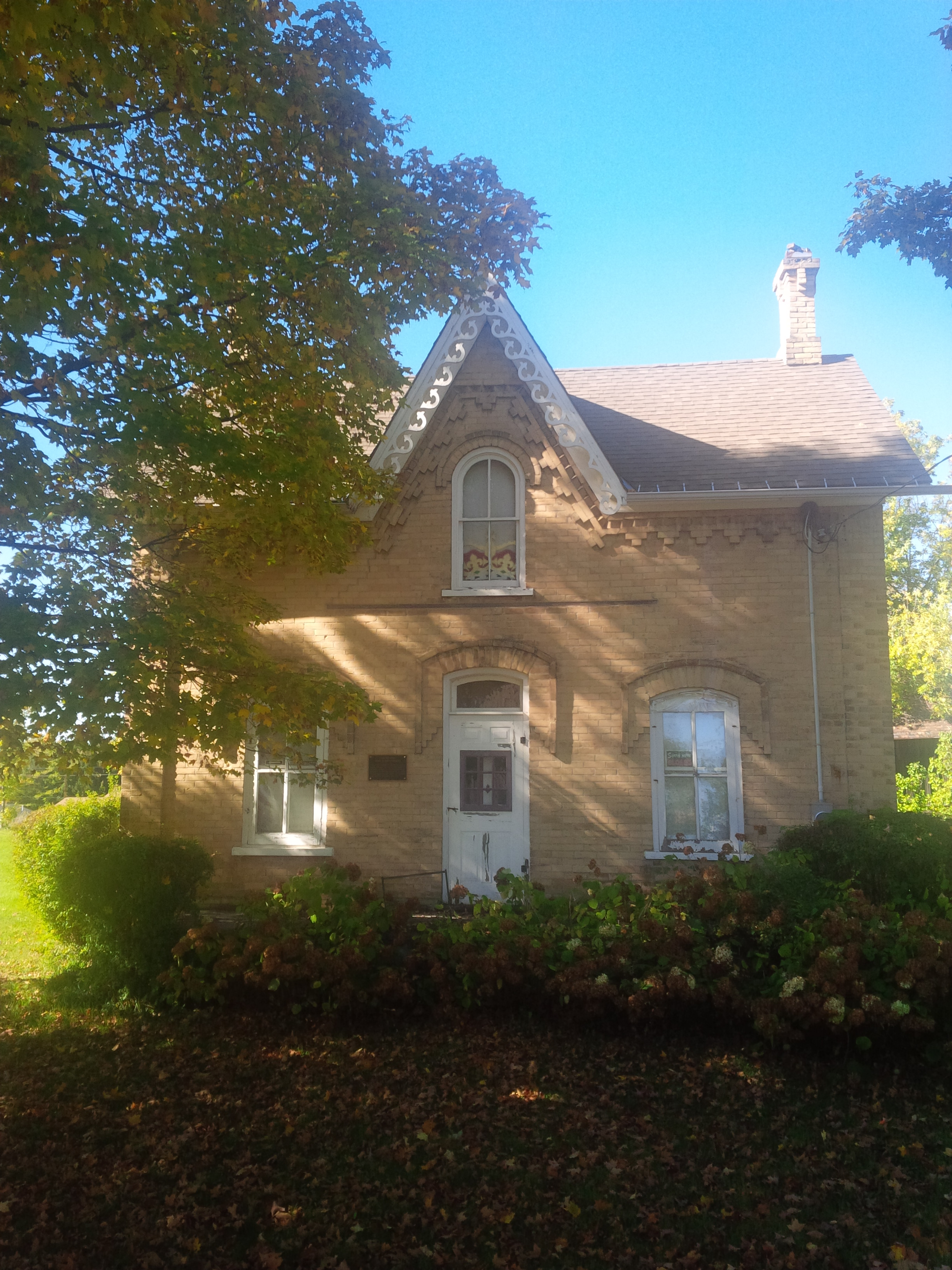
John Diefenbaker's birthplace

Neustadt has an array of historical sites located both in and out of the village. Throughout the area lie local fieldstone farmhouses, schools and churches, many of them built at the villages founding decades.

In addition to the collection of fieldstone farmhouses, churches and school, the village is also known for its Neustadt Springs Brewery, a member of the Ontario Craft Brewers association. The current Neustadt Springs Brewery took over the original Crystal Springs Brewery building which was first built in 1859 by Henry Huether, an immigrant from Baden Germany who helped to settle the village by employing and bringing over forty highly qualified stonemasons. Neustadt Springs Brewery has won awards for their products almost every year since 1999 and has been recognized as one of the three most popular tourist attractions in Grey county. The building is of note for its fieldstone architecture and a remaining section of subterranean stone tunnels that at one time existed below the high street.

Another attraction in the village is the family home of the 13th Prime Minister of Canada, John Diefenbaker.

== Demographics ==
In the 2021 Census of Population conducted by Statistics Canada, Neustadt had a population of 546 living in 243 of its 265 total private dwellings, a change of 5.6% from its 2016 population of 517. With a land area of 2.88 km^{2} (1.11 sq mi), it had a population density of 189.6/km^{2} (491.0/sq mi) in 2021.

== Community service ==
The municipality of West Grey and the village of Neustadt offer a wide variety of attractions and activities for tourists; it provides many services to area residents, including a Library, roads maintenance, parks and recreation. The village has a wide variety of garage sales and specialty shops selling antiques, fabrics, pottery, handmade items, and primitives. Some of the most common places visited are the Neustadt Springs Brewery, It's my pleasure...Baking Sweet and Savoury shop, Neustadt Lion's Park, the historic buildings of the Neustadt Public Library and the 150-year-old fieldstone St. Paul’s Normanby Church. The Village also hosts annual events such as the Fall fair in September, the Fall Craft Fair in November and the Santa Claus Parade in December.
