= Saugeen River =

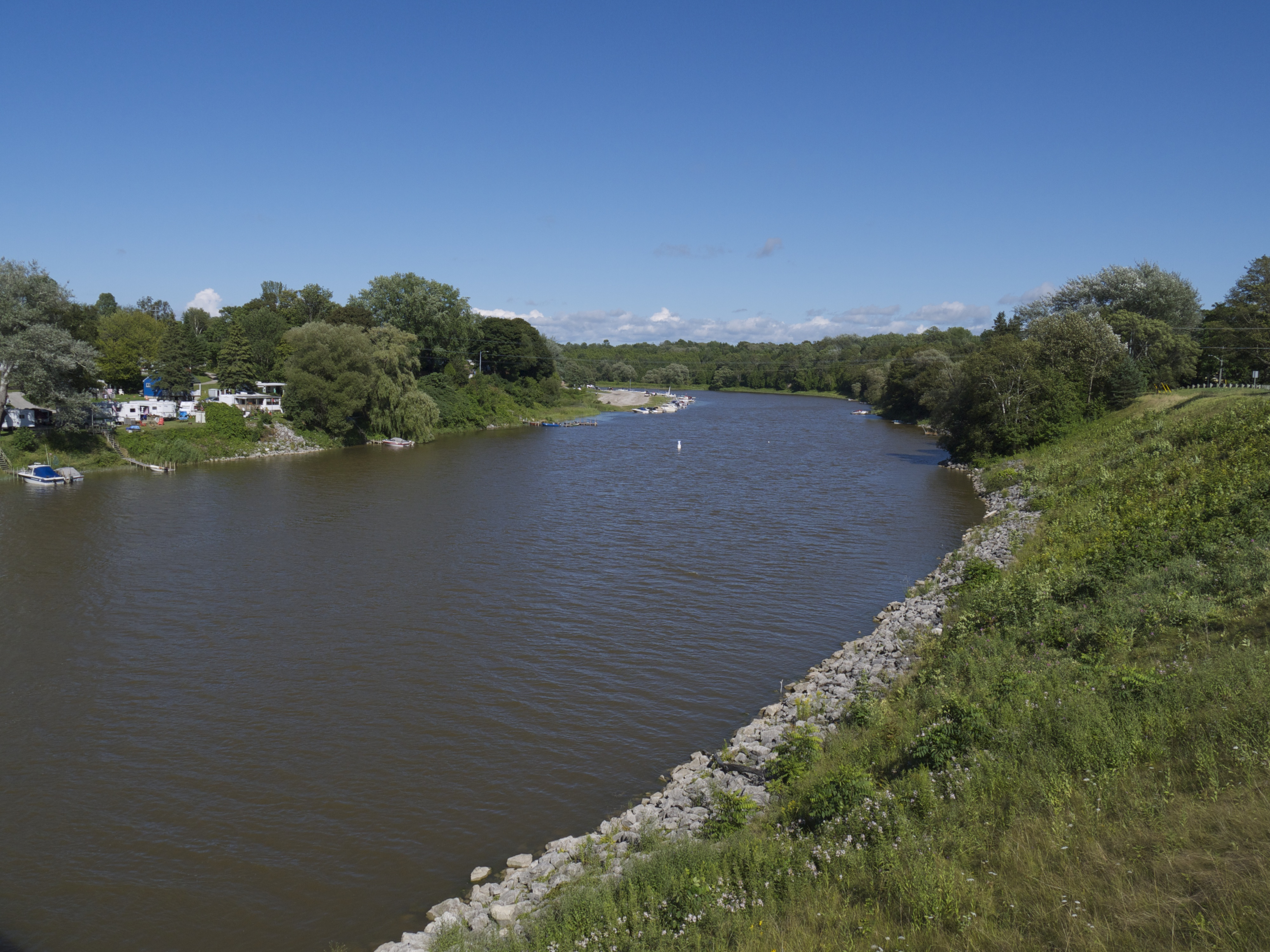
- Saugeen River in Southampton, about 1 km from its mouth at Lake Huron

Location
- Country: Canada
- Province: Ontario
- Region: Southwestern Ontario
- Counties: Bruce; Grey

Physical characteristics
- Source: Wetland
  - location: Osprey Wetland Conservation Lands, Grey County
  - coordinates: 44°14′58″N 80°21′12″W
  - elevation: 525 m (1,722 ft)
- Mouth: Lake Huron
  - location: Southampton, Bruce County
  - coordinates: 44°30′03″N 81°22′25″W
  - elevation: 190 m (620 ft)
- Length: 160 km (99 mi)
- Basin size: 4,120 km^{2} (1,590 sq mi)
- Discharge
  - average: 81.8 m^{3}/s (2,890 cu ft/s)

Basin features
- River system: Great Lakes Basin
- Tributaries
  - left: South Saugeen River; Teeswater River
  - right: North Saugeen River; Rocky Saugeen River

Map showing the Saugeen River system, in the part of Bruce County south of the Bruce Peninsula, and in Grey County. The orange line shows the drainage basin of the river system.

The Saugeen River is located in southern Ontario, Canada. The river begins in the Osprey Wetland Conservation Lands and flows generally north-west about 160 kilometres (99 mi) before exiting into Lake Huron. The river is navigable for some distance, and was once an important barge route. Today the river is best known for its fishing and as a canoe route.

The river's name comes from an Ojibwa language word Zaagiing, meaning outlet. Another source is more specific, indicating that "Saugeen" is the corrupted form of the Ojibwa word meaning the entrance or mouth of the river.

== Course ==
From its source in the Osprey Wetland Conservation Lands, the Saugeen River flows westerly before briefly turning to the north and flowing through the village of Wareham. After leaving Wareham, the river turns west again before then flowing southwest and crossing Ontario Highway 10. After crossing the highway the Saugeen meanders to the south-southwest before turning west again and then turning to the north and flowing through the village of Priceville. After reaching Priceville, the Saugeen flows generally westward and parallels the old route of Ontario Highway 4. The Saugeen flows westward into the town of Durham where it falls over McGowan Falls, a cascade waterfall in the Durham Conservation Area. Upon exiting the Durham Conservation Area the river crosses Ontario Highway 6 in downtown Durham. After leaving the town of Durham the Saugeen River turns northwest where it takes in the Rocky Saugeen River. Shortly afterwards the Saugeen makes a sharp turn to the south. Flowing south, the Saugeen takes in the Styx River before taking in Camp Creek north of the village of Allan Park. The Saugeen then turns west again, once again paralleling what was once Highway 4. The Saugeen River then skirts the northern edge of the town of Hanover before entering the Darroch Nature Reserve where it takes in the South Saugeen River. The Saugeen River then continues flowing west until it makes a sharp north turn near the town of Walkerton. The Saugeen then flows north through Walkerton and continues north-northwest. The Saugeen River then enters the town of Paisley where it takes in the Teeswater River in the center of the town and then takes in the North Saugeen River just north of Paisley. The river then continues northwards through the Saugeen Bluffs Conservation Area and then flows north into Denny's Dam Conservation Area. The Saugeen then turns west and enters the town of Southampton; it crosses Ontario Highway 21 at the Zgaa-biig-ni-gan Bridge ("we are connected" in the Ojibwe language) before emptying into Lake Huron.

== Tributaries ==
The river has two main tributaries; the South Saugeen and the North Saugeen. The South Saugeen begins near Dundalk while the North Saugeen's source is located near Holland Centre. The North Saugeen meets the Saugeen just north of Paisley, about 24 kilometres (15 mi) south-southeast of its exit into Lake Huron; the South Saugeen joins the Saugeen about 35 kilometres (22 mi) further southeast, near the town of Hanover.

- Mill Creek (left)
- North Saugeen River (right)
  - Negro Creek (left)
- Teeswater River (left)
- Vesta Creek (right)
- Ruhl Creek (right)
- South Saugeen River (left)
  - Beatty Saugeen River (right)
- Camp Creek (left)
- Styx River (right)
- Rocky Saugeen River (right)

== Canoe route ==
The main section suitable for leisure canoeing is the 102 kilometres (63 miles) section from Hanover to Southampton. This can be done over a three-day trip, including three short portages around dams, and takes in conditions from placid sections to modest rapids and eddies. Only in early spring does the water become unsafe for an experienced canoeist, and in most summers the water levels remain navigable even in dry periods.

== Communities ==
Saugeen River

- Southampton
- Paisley
- Walkerton
- Hanover
- Durham
- Priceville
- Wareham

North Saugeen River

- Chesley
- Scone
- Williamsford

South Saugeen River

- Neustadt
- Ayton
- Mount Forest

Rocky Saugeen River

- Aberdeen
- Markdale

== Hungerford's crawling water beetle ==
The North Saugeen River is home to one of the most critically endangered of all insects: the Hungerford's crawling water beetle. In fact, the only known population of Hungerford's crawling water beetles outside of the United States was discovered near Scone in Bruce County, Ontario. In 1986, 42 beetles were identified at a site downstream from a dam there. An unspecified number of beetles were last recorded in 2001, but surveys in 2002 uncovered no specimens. As a result, the status of this population of Hungerford's crawling water beetles is uncertain at present.

Although the Hungerford's crawling water beetle was categorized as endangered on March 7, 1994, under the provisions of the U.S. Endangered Species Act, it is currently not protected in Canada.

== See also ==
- Saugeen Valley Conservation Authority
- List of Ontario rivers
