= Arran–Elderslie =

- Municipality (lower-tier)
- Municipality of Arran–Elderslie
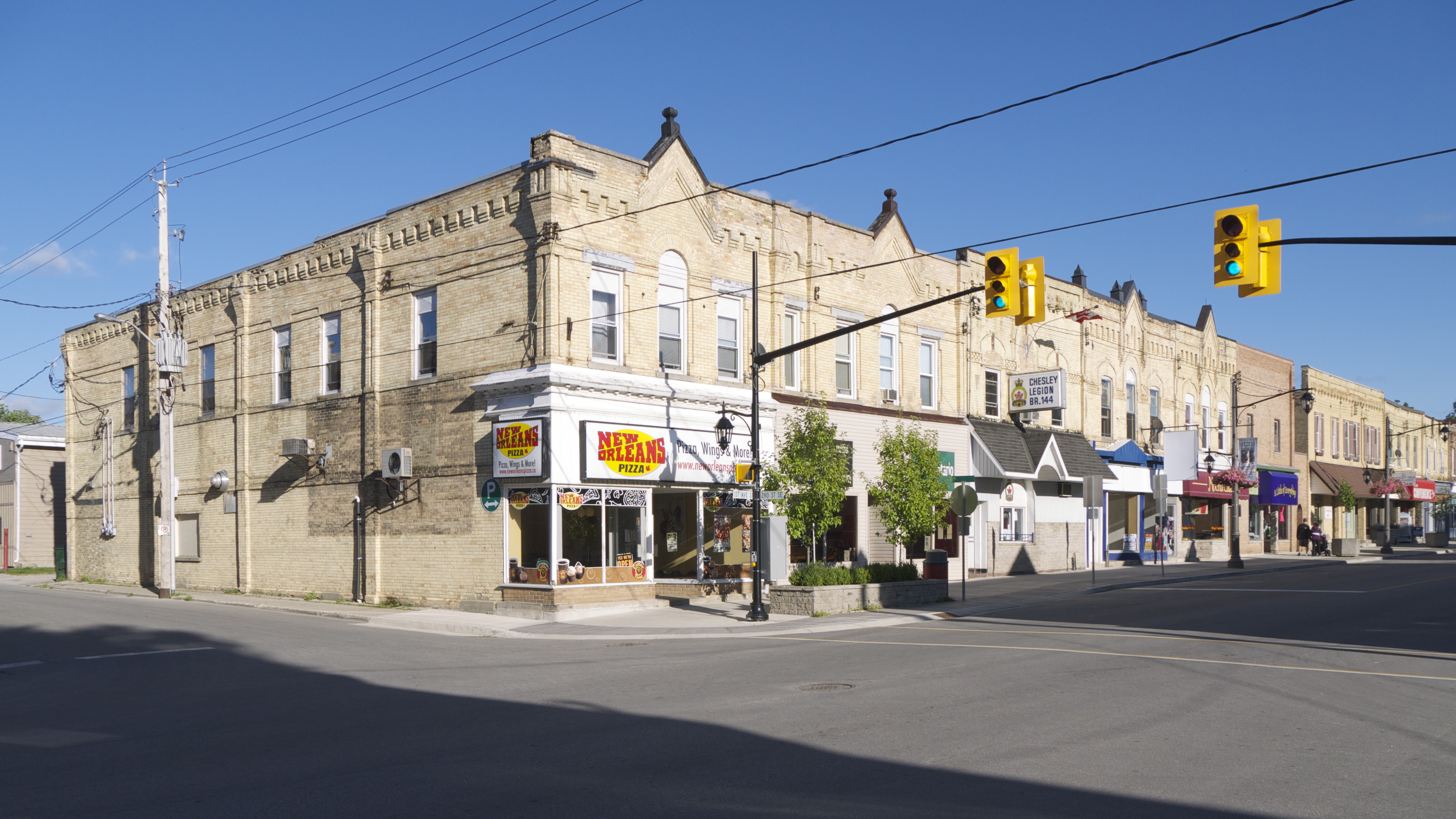
- 1st Avenue, Chesley

- Location within Bruce County Location within Southern Ontario
- Coordinates: 44°24′N 81°12′W
- Country: Canada
- Province: Ontario
- County: Bruce
- Formed: January 1, 1999

Government
  - Mayor: Steve Hammell
  - Fed. riding: Bruce—Grey—Owen Sound
  - Prov. riding: Bruce—Grey—Owen Sound

Area
  - Land: 458.76 km^{2} (177.13 sq mi)
- Elevation: 254 m (833 ft)

Population (2021)
  - Total: 6,913
  - Density: 15.1/km^{2} (39/sq mi)
- Time zone: UTC-5 (EST)
  - Summer (DST): UTC-4 (EDT)
- Postal Code: N0G
- Area codes: 519, 226
- Website: www.arran-elderslie.com

The Municipality of Arran–Elderslie is a township in Bruce County in Western Ontario, Canada. The township is located at the headwaters of the Sauble River, and the Saugeen River forms the northwestern boundary.

The municipality was formed on January 1, 1999, through the amalgamation of Arran Township, Elderslie Township, Chesley Town, Tara Village, and Paisley Village.

== Communities ==
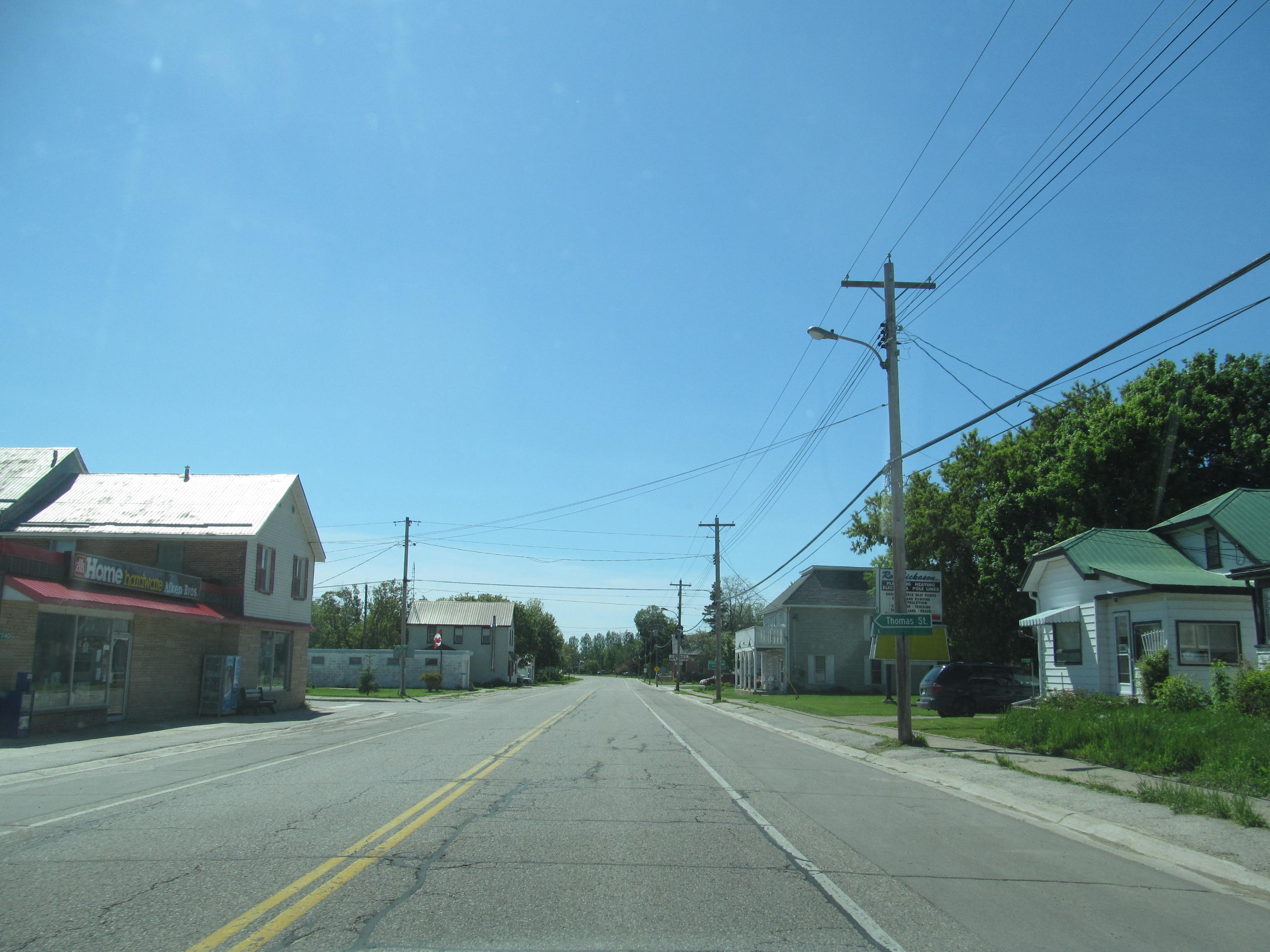
Allenford

The township comprises the communities of:

- Allenford
- Arkwright
- Arranvale
- Arran Lake
- Burgoyne
- Chesley
- Dobbinton
- Dreamland
- Dunblane
- Ellengowan
- Elsinore
- Gillies Hill
- Invermay
- Kelly's Corners
- Lockerby
- Mount Hope
- Paisley
- Salem
- Salisbury
- Tara
- Vesta
- Williscroft

== Demographics ==
In the 2021 Census of Population conducted by Statistics Canada, Arran–Elderslie had a population of 6,913 living in 2,782 of its 2,998 total private dwellings, a change of 1.6% from its 2016 population of 6,803. With a land area of 458.76 km^{2} (177.13 sq mi), it had a population density of 15.1/km^{2} (39.0/sq mi) in 2021.

Canada census – Arran-Elderslie community profile

	2021	2016	2011
Population	6,913 (+1.6% from 2016)	6,803 (-0.1% from 2011)	6,810 (+0.9% from 2006)
Land area	458.76 km^{2} (177.13 sq mi)	460.07 km^{2} (177.63 sq mi)	460.13 km^{2} (177.66 sq mi)
Population density	15.1/km^{2} (39/sq mi)	14.8/km^{2} (38/sq mi)	14.8/km^{2} (38/sq mi)
Median age	42.0 (M: 41.6, F: 42.8)	41.8 (M: 41.2, F: 42.7)	40.7 (M: 39.7, F: 41.5)
Private dwellings	2,998 (total) 2,782 (occupied)	3,030 (total)	2,941 (total)
Median household income	$80,000	$63,687

References: 2021 2016 2011

Historical census populations – Arran–Elderslie
Year	Pop.	±%
2001	6,577	—
2006	6,747	+2.6%
2011	6,810	+0.9%
2016	6,803	−0.1%
2021	6,913	+1.6%
Source: Statistics Canada

- Population total in 1996: 6,851
  - Arran (township): 1,707
  - Chesley (town): 1,904
  - Elderslie (township): 1,231
  - Paisley (village): 1,106
  - Tara (village): 903
- Population in 1991:
  - Arran (township): 1,690
  - Chesley (town): 1,852
  - Elderslie (township): 1,219
  - Paisley (village): 1,102
  - Tara (village): 848

== See also ==
- List of municipalities in Ontario
- Bruce County municipal elections, 2010
- List of townships in Ontario
