= Grey County =

- County (upper-tier)
- County of Grey
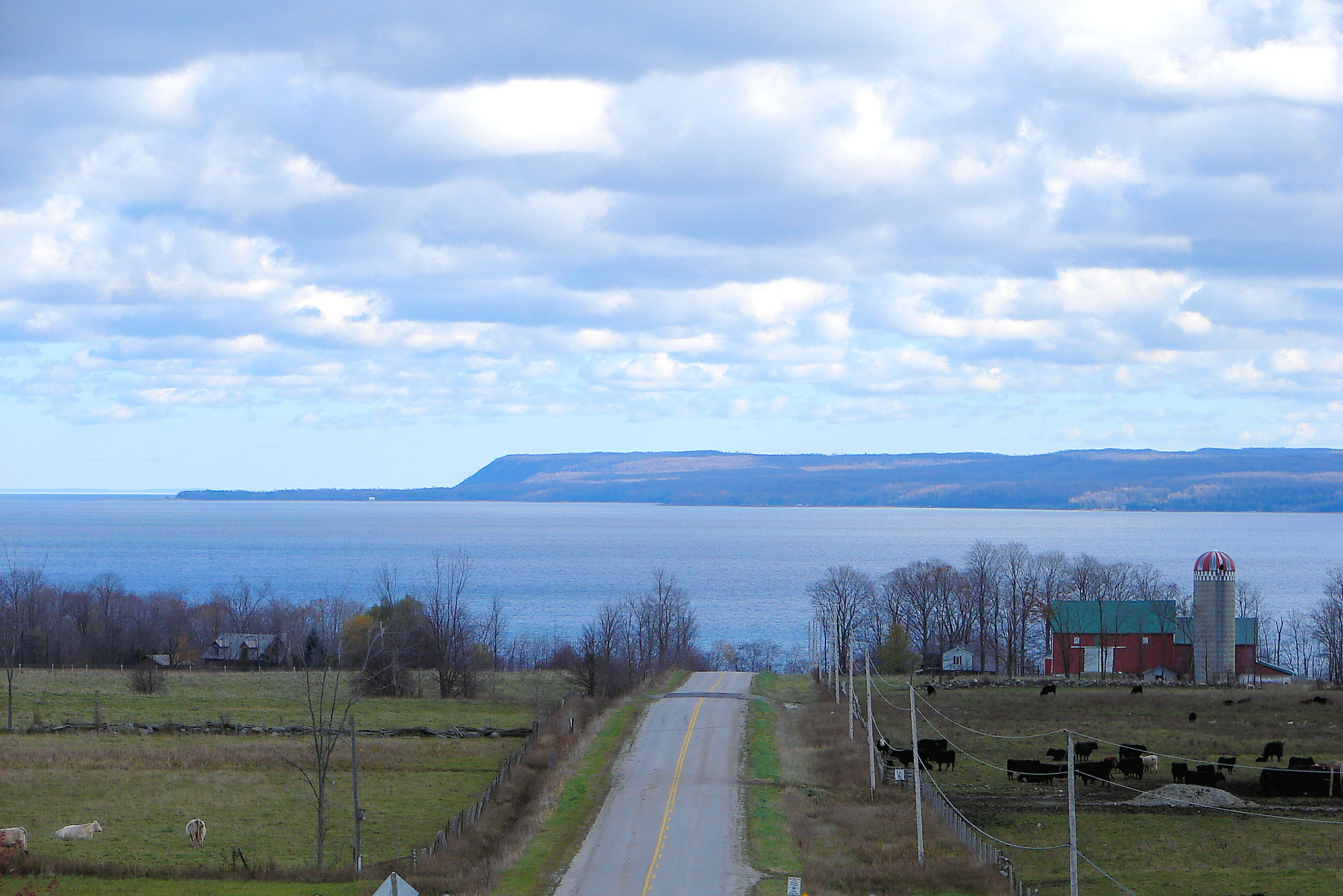

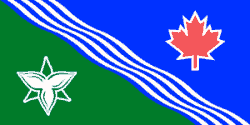
- Flag Seal Logo
- Motto: "Colour it your way"
- Coordinates: 44°20′N 80°40′W
- Country: Canada
- Province: Ontario
- Established: 1852
- County seat: Owen Sound
- Subdivisions: List: City of Owen Sound; Town of The Blue Mountains; Town of Hanover; Municipality (Town) of Meaford; Township of Chatsworth; Township of Georgian Bluffs; Municipality (township) of Grey Highlands; Township of Southgate; Township of West Grey

Government
  - Type: Upper Tier Municipal Government

Area
  - Land: 4,497.93 km^{2} (1,736.66 sq mi)

Population (2021)
  - Total: 100,905
  - Density: 22.4/km^{2} (58/sq mi)
- Time zone: UTC-5 (EST)
  - Summer (DST): UTC-4 (EDT)
- Area code: 519 / 226 / 548
- Website: www.grey.ca

Grey County is a county in the province of Ontario. The county is located in the Southwestern Ontario region, and is a part of the Georgian Triangle. At the time of the 2021 Canadian census the population of the county was 100,905. Owen Sound is the county seat and the largest city in Grey County.

== Administrative divisions ==
Grey County consists of the following municipalities (in order of population):

Municipality	2016 Population	Population Centres
City of Owen Sound	21,341	Owen Sound
Municipality of West Grey	12,518	Durham
Municipality of Meaford	10,991	Meaford
Township of Georgian Bluffs	10,479	
Municipality of Grey Highlands	9,804	Markdale
Town of Hanover	7,688	Hanover
Township of Southgate	7,354	Dundalk
Town of The Blue Mountains	7,025	Thornbury
Township of Chatsworth	6,630	Chatsworth

== History ==
=== Origin and evolution ===
The first European settlement was in the vicinity of Collingwood or Meaford. Exploring parties arrived from York in 1825 by travelling from Holland Landing and down the Holland River into Lake Simcoe and Shanty Bay. From there they travelled by land to the Nottawasaga River into Georgian Bay and along the thickly wooded shore.

In 1837, the village of Sydenham was surveyed by Charles Rankin. In 1856, it was incorporated as the Town of Owen Sound with an estimated population of 2,000.

In 1840, the area became part of the new District of Wellington, and its territory formed the County of Waterloo for electoral purposes. In 1849, Wellington District was abolished, and Waterloo County remained for municipal and judicial purposes. The territory of the Bruce Peninsula became part of Waterloo in 1849, but was later withdrawn and transferred to Bruce County in 1851.

In January 1852, Waterloo County became the United Counties of Wellington, Waterloo and Grey. Grey County was named in honour of the British Colonial Secretary's father, Charles Grey, 2nd Earl Grey, who was Prime Minister of the United Kingdom from 1830-1834. Its territory was declared to consist of the following townships, together with part of the Indian Reserves on the Bruce Peninsula:

- Artemesia
- Bentinck
- Collingwood
- Derby
- Egremont
- Euphrasia
- Glenelg
- Holland
- Melancthon
- Normanby
- Osprey
- Proton
- Saint Vincent
- Sullivan
- Sydenham

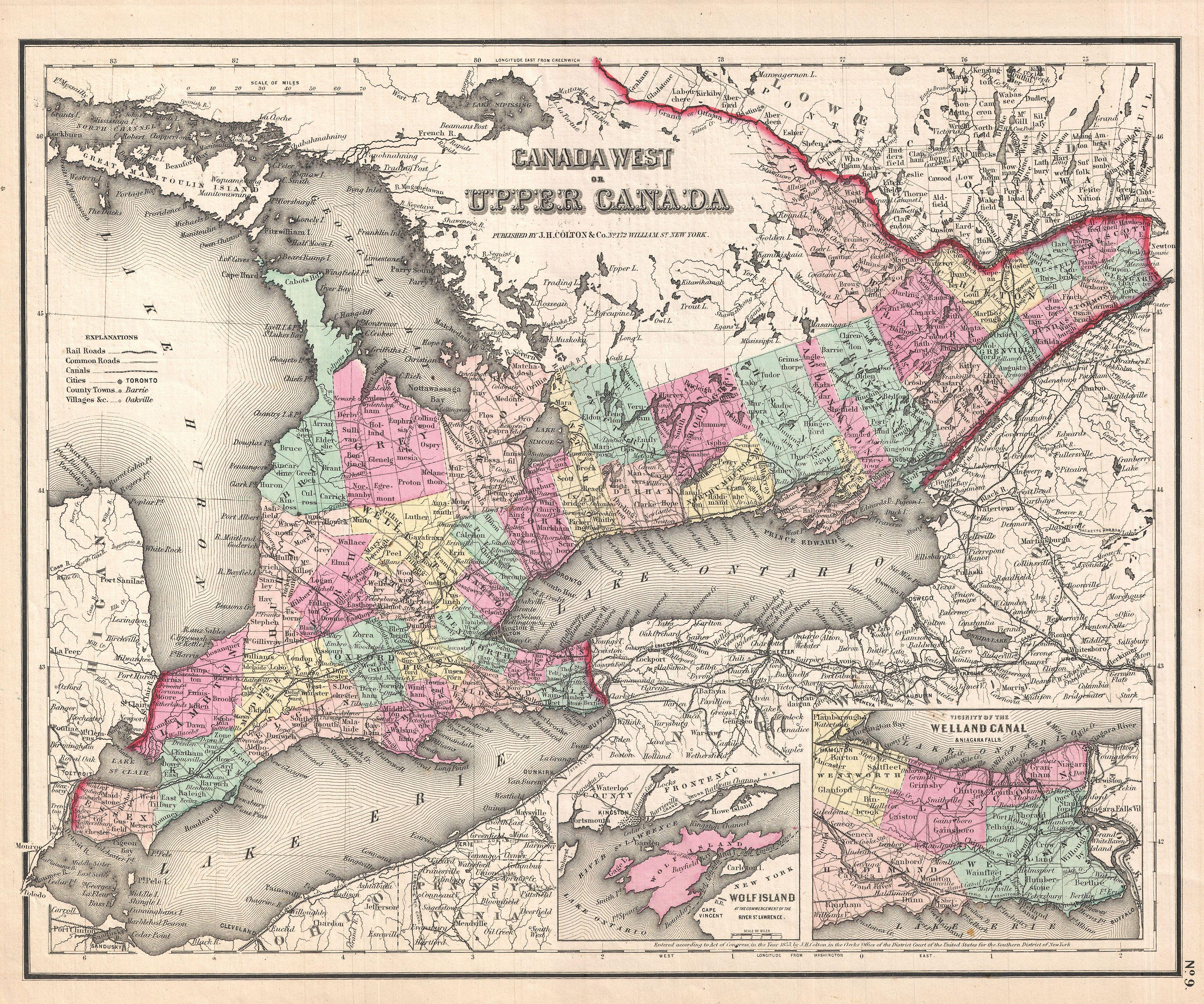
Canada West in 1857. Grey County is marked in dark pink.

The Indian lands were later surveyed and became the townships of Keppel and Sarawak. A Provisional Municipal Council was organized for the County in April 1852, with the Town of Sydenham named as the county town.

Waterloo was withdrawn from the United Counties in January 1853, and the remainder was renamed the United Counties of Wellington and Grey. In January 1854, the United Counties was dissolved, and Wellington and Grey were separate counties for all purposes.

In 1861-1862 the first gravel roads were constructed into Owen Sound at a cost of $300,000. The four colonization roads were:

- the Garafraxa Road running from Fergus to Owen Sound (now Highway 6);
- the Durham Road leading east and west from the village of Durham (formerly part of Highway 4, and now County Road 4);
- the Lake Shore Road from Collingwood to Owen Sound (now Highway 26); and
- the Toronto-Sydenham Road leading from Shelburne to Owen Sound (now Highway 10).

Prior to the road building it often took two days to walk up to Owen Sound.

In 1881, the township of Melancthon and the village of Shelburne were withdrawn from Grey and transferred to the new Dufferin County.

On January 1, 2001, Grey County underwent a major restructuring, resulting in the reduction in number of the local municipalities:

New Municipality	Constituted from
City of Owen Sound
Town of Hanover
Town of The Blue Mountains	Thornbury and Collingwood Township
Township of Chatsworth	Chatsworth, Sullivan and Holland
Township of Georgian Bluffs	Shallow Lake, Keppel, Derby and Sarawak
Municipality of Grey Highlands	Flesherton, Markdale, Artemesia, Euphrasia and Osprey
Municipality of Meaford	Meaford, St. Vincent and Sydenham
Township of Southgate	Dundalk, Egremont and Proton
Municipality of West Grey	Durham, Neustadt, Glenelg, Normanby and Bentinck

== Demographics ==
As a census division in the 2021 Census of Population conducted by Statistics Canada, Grey County had a population of 100,905 living in 42,309 of its 50,183 total private dwellings, a change of 7.5% from its 2016 population of 93,830. With a land area of 4,497.93 km^{2} (1,736.66 sq mi), it had a population density of 22.4/km^{2} (58.1/sq mi) in 2021.

Canada census – Grey community profile

	2021	2016	2011
Population	100,905 (+7.5% from 2016)	93,830 (+1.4% from 2011)	92,568 (+0.2% from 2006)
Land area	4,497.93 km^{2} (1,736.66 sq mi)	4,513.50 km^{2} (1,742.67 sq mi)	4,513.21 km^{2} (1,742.56 sq mi)
Population density	22.4/km^{2} (58/sq mi)	20.8/km^{2} (54/sq mi)	20.5/km^{2} (53/sq mi)
Median age	49.6 (M: 48.0, F: 50.8)	49.3 (M: 48.1, F: 50.4)
Private dwellings	50,183 (total) 42,309 (occupied)	47,560 (total)	46,481 (total)
Median household income	$78,000	$62,935

References: 2021 2016 2011

Historical census populations – Grey County

Year	Pop.	±%
1921	59,051	—
1931	57,699	−2.3%
1941	57,160	−0.9%
1951	58,960	+3.1%
1956	60,971	+3.4%
1961	62,005	+1.7%

Year	Pop.	±%
1966	62,592	+0.9%
1971	66,403	+6.1%
1976	72,176	+8.7%
1981	73,824	+2.3%
1986	74,759	+1.3%
1991	84,071	+12.5%

Year	Pop.	±%
1996	87,632	+4.2%
2001	89,073	+1.6%
2006	92,411	+3.7%
2011	92,568	+0.2%
2016	93,830	+1.4%
2021	100,905	+7.5%

Population counts are not adjusted for boundary changes.
Source: Statistics Canada

== See also ==
- List of municipalities in Ontario
- Census divisions of Ontario
- List of townships in Ontario
- Saugeen Kame Terraces
- List of secondary schools in Grey County, Ontario
