= Charles Rankin =

Canadian surveyor (1797–1886)

- Born: 1797; Enniskillen, County Fermanagh, Kingdom of Ireland
- Died: 15 March 1886 (aged 88–89) or 12 October 1888 (aged 90–91); Owen Sound, Ontario, Canada
- Burial place: Disputed
- Occupation: Land surveyor
- Spouse: Elizabeth Leech
- Children: 1
- Relatives: Arthur Rankin (brother)

Charles Rankin, PLS (1797 − 1886 or 12 October 1888) was an early Ulster Scots settler in Upper Canada (the predecessor to the province of Ontario, Canada). He is significant due to his role in the surveying and early settlement of large areas of Upper Canada, including much of the Bruce Peninsula and south shore of Lake Huron, and notably the city of Owen Sound. Born in 1797 at Enniskillen, County Fermanagh, Ireland, he died in either 1886 or 1888 in Owen Sound, a city whose founding he had been instrumental in.

== Biography ==
=== Early life ===
Rankin's father, George Rankin, was born in 1762 at Enniskillen, County Fermanagh, which today is a part of Northern Ireland. His ancestors had originally migrated from Ayrshire, Scotland, to participate in the 17th-century Plantation of Ulster. George married Mary Stuart (born in Bunker Hill, Massachusetts to Scottish immigrants) and the couple had seven children: John (who became a medical doctor in Picton, Ontario), Charles, George Junior (who became an army surgeon in India), James (died young), Susan, Kate, and Arthur.

Charles was born in 1797, also in Enniskillen, but after the end of the War of 1812, he accompanied his parents and siblings to Montréal in Lower Canada, where his younger brother Arthur was born in 1816. The elder Rankins would later move to Amherstburg, York (now Toronto), and finally Bytown (now Ottawa), but Charles' life would diverge from theirs before that point.

=== Surveying career ===
==== Deputy provincial surveyor ====
After the War of 1812, Upper Canada experienced a significant immigration wave. Militiamen and soldiers received land grants, and the re-fortification of the north shore of the Great Lakes during the war enriched the merchants, farmers, and mill owners who supplied the forts. With the districts around Detroit and Niagara already settled from the previous generation of pioneers (who had settled the area during and after the American Revolutionary War), the government of Upper Canada, under the control of the oligarchical Family Compact, sought to colonize areas which were further away from the American border, which could be a defensible "heartland" for the province. Development agencies like the Canada Company were formed, and by the middle of the 19th century the government would be laying out the colonization roads to key destinations, with townships along the way, creating secure land-based routes between the previously scattered and isolated lakeshore settlements which had been vulnerable to American interdiction and blockade during the War of 1812. Surveyors were suddenly in significant demand, and became an important profession in the province.

On 27 December 1820, Charles Rankin was appointed deputy provincial land surveyor for Upper Canada's Hesse (or Western) District by Peregrine Maitland, the 4th lieutenant governor of Upper Canada, who was also an early advocate of the Canadian Indian residential school system as a means to deepen British control of the province's indigenous population. Initially based in the township of Malden near Amherstburg, Rankin developed a close understanding of the region's natural geography throughout the 1820s. He would not stay there, however. In the early 1830s, he would survey a number of townships scattered throughout the province in rapid succession: in 1830, Eldon and Fenelon in what would become Victoria County (now the city of Kawartha Lakes); in 1831, Presquisle or Presqu'ile Point; in 1833, the Nottawasaga Bay area (where he settled on some 200 acres (0.81 km^{2}) of land west of the present town of Thornbury); and in 1834, Loughborough (now the community of Sydenham in Frontenac County), Gore, Crowland (now a part of the city of Welland in Niagara Region), Humberston or Humberstone (now a part of Port Colborne), and Blanford or Blandford (now the township of Blandford-Blenheim in Oxford County). He began surveying his first colonization road, the Garafraxa Colonization Road from Oakville to Owen Sound, in 1837, but was only able to survey as far as Arthur when the Upper Canada Rebellion broke out. The survey would be finished several years later by a different surveyor, John McDonald.

==== Owen Sound ====
Rankin would surface again in 1840, undertaking the surveying of a new township at a strategic location: the intersection of the Sydenham River, the Pottawatomi River, and an inlet on Lake Huron's Georgian Bay, which had been named Owen Sound a few decades earlier by the British explorer William Fitzwilliam Owen. This had been intended as the northern terminus of the Garafraxa Colonization Road, with the road and town site being a part of an 1836 plan by Francis Bond Head, Upper Canada's new, 6th lieutenant governor. In a shift from the policies of Maitland (which leaned toward assimilation and close management of indigenous people), Head believed that indigenous people could never be "civilized", and that the best course of action was to keep indigenous and settler populations geographically and administratively apart, with the ultimate goal of relocation of indigenous people to Manitoulin Island. This policy was enacted with the 1836 Saugeen Tract Agreement, intended to clear indigenous people from the Saugeen, Bruce, or so-called "Indian" Peninsula.

By the time of Rankin's arrival, the inlet's Ojibwe inhabitants had become displeased with intrusions on their territory. This resulted in Rankin being forced to stay on the east side of the Sydenham River, away from their village to the northwest. It was at this location where, on 7 October 1840, he would meet with a party led by John Telfer, the Crown land agent for the area. Telfer would quickly begin to oversee the construction of buildings and settling of Europeans in the town site (then named Sydenham) laid out by Rankin, along with a number of buildings in the Ojibwe settlement to the northwest, which became the Newash or Nawash "Indian Village" and was an official reserve. This would only last a few years, however, as the Ojibwe would be relocated to a new reserve on Colpoy's Bay, then again to Cape Croker. Today these scattered groups are referred to as the Saugeen Ojibway Nation, and the original Nawash reserve land is a part of the city of Owen Sound.

==== Marriage and later career ====
Also in 1840, Rankin married his wife, Elizabeth Leech. A governess by occupation, she had come to Canada in 1838 with the family of George Arthur, the brief, 7th lieutenant governor of Upper Canada. She was also the aunt of John Leech, the noted English caricaturist and illustrator for Punch. With Charles largely absent due to his survey work, Elizabeth opened a private school for young women in a large frame building standing at the northwest corner of King Street and York Street, on a site which would later be occupied by the Palmer House hotel. This house is where their only child, Mary, would be born on 26 November 1844.

Throughout the early 1840s, Rankin continued his survey work around Owen Sound and the south shore of Lake Huron, laying out secondary town sites as well as separate townships: Holland and Sullivan in Grey County in 1845; Saugeen, Indian Bay, and Derby (also Grey County) in 1846; and Kempenfeldt and Barrie Park in 1847. This was followed by the surveying of a number of roads between existing settlements, as well as additional plots for these settlements.

In 1847, Rankin had a brief period of activity on Lake Huron's north shore as well as its south shore, joining his brother, Arthur, in surveying around present-day Bruce Mines in the early 1840s. Indigenous-made copper jewellery had been attested to for years by Europeans throughout the Great Lakes, and archaeologists working in the 1970s discovered copper caches dating as far back as the Archaic period (8,000 to 3,000 BP, or c. 6,000 to 1,000 BCE). French documents from the 1650s also alluded to the presence of organized mining efforts by indigenous people, though no concrete archaeological evidence of the methods have been established, and the mining activities may have been confined to placer mining and sifting. Nevertheless, rumours of vast mineral resources drew a number of European surveyors and prospectors to the north shore, such as the Rankin brothers, as well as another prominent Upper Canada surveyor of the era, Albert Salter. This venture would be extremely profitable for the Rankins, as Arthur would later sell his shares in the Montreal Mining Company for £30,000, insulating him from the eventual crash of the Bruce Mines copper rush in 1876 due to flooding and cave-ins at the mines, and allowing him to finance his 1850s political career.

Charles, meanwhile, moved to Owen Sound permanently in 1850. He returned to surveying even more townline roads, townships, and township plots around Georgian Bay throughout the 1850s, notably the townships of Artemesia, Arran, Minto, and Southampton. He was also present at the signing of the 1854 Saugeen Surrenders (also known as Crown Treaty No. 72), which saw the signing away of the original Saugeen Ojibwe reserve lands for settlement in exchange for the currently-held five tracts.

=== Later life ===
Rankin continued to live in Owen Sound in a home on the west side of the harbour for much of the rest of his life. His wife, Elizabeth, died in 1872. Mary, his daughter, married Samuel Victor Hutchins, the eldest son of the Reverend Henry Hutchins of Prairie du Sac, Sauk County, Wisconsin. Hutchins worked as a manager at various Molson's Bank locations in Ontario, and later worked in the audit department of the City of Toronto's treasury. They had nine children.

Charles Rankin's death date and burial location are disputed, with sources variously claiming that he moved to Millbrook to live with his daughter, where he died on 15 March 1886 and was buried in St. James Cemetery in Toronto, alongside his wife and parents; or that he died on 12 October 1888 and is buried at Greenwood Cemetery in Owen Sound. His Ontario Heritage Plaque in Owen Sound lists his death as being in 1886.

== Legacy ==
Rankin's legacy largely exists in the form of the many roads and townships he laid out or whose early settlement he was involved in, such as the Garafraxa Colonization Road, which largely still exists in the form of Ontario Highway 6, or most notably, his role in the settlement and founding of the city of Owen Sound. As such, he had a strong role in shaping the modern human geography of much of Southwestern Ontario, especially Grey County and Bruce County. A river in Bruce County, the Rankin River, is named after him.

In 1990, legal proceedings began over a strip of land along the Sauble Beach lakeshore, with the Canadian federal government upholding Saugeen First Nation's claim to it as a part of the Saugeen 29 reserve. Rankin's work as a surveyor came under modern scrutiny when the Saugeen First Nation used it as evidence in their land claims dispute with the town of South Bruce Peninsula, arguing that an 1855 survey map authored by him validated their claims. In another claim filed in 1994, both the Saugeen First Nation and Chippewas of Nawash Unceded First Nation challenged the Crown on its alleged failure to uphold the terms of Treaty 72, which instructed "[t]hat the interest of the principal sum arising out of the sale of our lands be regularly paid, to ourselves and our children in perpetuity, so long as there are Indians left to represent our tribe, without diminution, at half-yearly periods," and requested reparations in the form of $90 billion, as well as the return of unsold Crown lands in the Treaty 72 area, much of it still existing in the form of twenty-metre shore allowances left by surveyors like Charles Rankin. Trial proceedings began in April 2019.
