= Chippewas of Nawash Unceded First Nation =

First nation band in Ontario, Canada

Coordinates: 44°54′30″N 81°01′21″W

- Band No. 122
- Neyaashiinigmiing Anishinaabek
- Logo of the Chippewas of Nawash Unceded First Nation
- People: Ojibway
- Province: Bruce Peninsula, Ontario

Land
- Main reserve: Neyaashiinigmiing 27
- Reserves: Cape Croker Hunting Ground 60B; Saugeen and Cape Croker Fishing Islands 1
- Land area: 71.83 km^{2} (27.73 sq mi)

Population
- On reserve: 724
- Off reserve: 1958
- Total population: 2714

Government
- Chief: Chief Veronica Smith
- Council size: 9

Website
- www.nawash.ca

The Chippewas of Nawash Unceded First Nation (Ojibwe: Neyaashiinigmiing Anishinaabek) is an Anishinaabek First Nation from the Bruce Peninsula region in Ontario, Canada. Along with the Saugeen First Nation, they form the Saugeen Ojibway Nation. The Chippewas of Nawash Unceded First Nation had a registered membership of 2758 individuals, as of December 2020. Approximately 700 members live on the main reserve, Neyaashiinigmiing 27 (formerly known as Cape Croker). The First Nation has 3 reserves: Neyaashiinigmiing 27, Cape Croker Hunting Ground 60B and Saugeen and Cape Croker Fishing Islands 1. The size of all reserves is 8083.70 hectares (31.21 sq. mi.).

== Etymology ==
The name Nawash is from Chief Nawash, who fought with Tecumseh during the War of 1812.

== History ==
=== Origins ===
From time immemorial, Neyaashiinigmiing has been home to Anishinaabek peoples in the area. Modern archaeology have been able to identify artifacts dating to the Middle Woodland period from 200 BCE to 500 CE, forming what is known as the Saugeen complex First Nation culture. The traditional lands of the Saugeen Anishinaabek, which historically encompassed modern day Neyaashiinigmiing Anishinaabek lands, included the entire Bruce Peninsula and roughly 2 million acres (8,100 km^{2}) south of it. The contemporary Indigenous population of the Chippewas of Nawash also includes peoples from many nations that moved into Saugeen Anishinaabek lands after the War of 1812 from Ohio and New York, as well as peoples from Michigan and Wisconsin that moved as a result of the American Indian Removal Policies of the 1830s.

=== Land surrenders ===
In August 1836, representatives of the Ojibwa and Ottawa of Saugeen entered into an agreement, the Saugeen Tract Agreement or Treaty 45½, with Lieutenant-Governor Francis Bond Head. Under its recorded terms, lands were transferred to the Crown while territory on and around the peninsula remained for the Indigenous people with a "promise to assist and protect Indians who took up residence on Manitoulin Island or on the Bruce Peninsula, north of Owen Sound."

In 1854, the Saugeen Surrenders or Treaty 72 was entered into agreement, under the claim that the Crown could no longer guarantee protection from the European settlers moving into the area. It transferred most of the Bruce Peninsula to the Crown while providing for reserved lands for the Saugeen Ojibway communities, including Cape Croker (now Neyaashiinigmiing) for the Owen Sound Band (referred to as the Owen Sound Indians in the official treaty text).

In 1857, Treaty 82 surrendered the Nawash Reserve northwest of Owen Sound, with residents moving to present day Neyaashiinigmiing, forming the Cape Croker Band. In 1861, Treaty 93 surrendered the Colpoy’s Bay Reserve. While the majority of residents moving to Christian Island, some moved to Neyaashiinigmiing joining and amalgamating with the Cape Croker Band. From 1885 to 1899 many islands in Georgian Bay were surrendered to the Crown.

=== Post-treaty history ===
In 1896, Saugeen Hunting Ground 60 was reserved as hunting grounds for the Chippewas of Nawash and Saugeen First Nation. Later in 1965, Cape Croker Hunting Ground 60B was formed from the larger Saugeen Hunting Ground 60. In 1968, the title to 89 of the smaller islands, totalling 10.1 hectares (25 acres) in area, were returned to Chippewa control, forming the Saugeen and Cape Croker Fishing Islands 1 reserve shared between the Chippewas of Nawash and Saugeen First Nation.

On March 23, 1976, the Cape Croker Band renamed to the present day Chippewas of Nawash name. On January 21, 1992, the main reserve of the Chippewas of Nawash, Cape Croker, was officially renamed to Neyaashiinigmiing.

=== Land claims ===
In 1993, the First Nation won a court battle giving them the right to fish for trade and commerce in their traditional waters surrounding the Bruce Peninsula.

In 1994, the Saugeen Ojibway Nation, including the Chippewas of Nawash, filed a land claim for broken treaty promises made by Treaty 45½ and Treaty 72. The claim sought to address the breach of contract by the Crown of failing to prevent encroachment on Saugeen Ojibway Nation settlers as promised in 1836 by Treaty 45½ when negotiating Treaty 72. The land claim was upheld in 2021 and 2023 by Ontario courts, but the courts did not find that the Crown broke its "fiduciary duty" to keep the promise it made in Treaty 45½.

In 2003, the Nawash and the Saugeen First Nations filed a lawsuit against the Government of Canada for traditional territories under the waters of Lake Huron and Georgian Bay "from south of Goderich, west to the international border and north to the mid-point between the tip of the Bruce Peninsula and Manitoulin Island; then east to the midpoint of Georgian Bay and south to the southernmost point of Nottawasaga Bay." The claim was dropped in 2025 after over 20 years in court.

In 2008, the Chippewas of Nawash joined the Coldwater-Narrows land claim alongside the Chippewa Tri-Council (the Chippewas of Rama, the Chippewas of Georgina Island, and the Beausoleil First Nation). The land claim was concerning the invalid surrenderment of the Coldwater-Narrows reserve in 1836. A CA$307 million (2012) (equivalent to CA$413.53 million or US$295.8 million in 2025) settlement was reached in 2011, and ratified by the four communities in 2012. This settlement established the Coldwater Trust for the long-term benefit of the Chippewas of Nawash.

In 2014, the Chippewas of Nawash launched a land claim over unsold surrendered land and an entitlement to a one-acre burial ground that they never received. The claim was accepted by the Government of Ontario in June 2016 and settlement is ongoing.

In 2014, the Official Plan for the Town of Saugeen Shores included the following comment about land claims: "The Chippewas of the Saugeen First Nation and the Chippewas of Nawash First Nation have filed a Native Land Claim for the islands in the Saugeen River, the lands that border the north side of the Saugeen River and the shoreline from the mouth of the Saugeen River northerly around the Bruce Peninsula."

== Reserves ==
Map of the reserves of Chippewa of Newash First Nation

Chippewas of Nawash have three reserves in perpetuity, amassing to 71.83 km^{2} (27.73 sq mi). Of these three, the 63.81 km^{2} (24.64 sq mi) Neyaashiinigmiing 27 is considered the main reserve, and Saugeen & Cape Croker Fishing Island 1 is shared with Saugeen First Nation.

=== Neyaashiinigmiing 27 ===
Formerly known as Cape Croker 27, Neyaashiinigmiing 27 is located within Bruce County, Ontario. It has an area of 63.81 km^{2} (24.64 sq mi), and is the largest reserve of the three.

=== Cape Croker Hunting Ground 60B ===
Cape Croker Hunting Ground 60B is surrounded by Bruce Peninsula National Park to the north and Saugeen Hunting Grounds 60A to the south.

=== Saugeen and Cape Croker Fishing Islands ===
Saugeen and Cape Croker Fishing Islands 1 consists of 89 island shared with Saugeen First Nation.

== Government ==
Leaders of the Chippewas of Nawash Unceded First Nation are elected every two years by the population registered on the band list.

The current Chief and Council are:

- Chief Veronica (Cha-Cha) Smith
- Anthony Chegahno
- Arlene Chegahno
- Carlene Keeshig
- Norma Tobey
- Beverly Nadjiwon
- Nick Saunders
- Jessica Keeshig-Martin
- Theron Solomon
- Paul Jones

== Media and entertainment ==
=== FM radio ===
- 100.1 - CHFN - A low-power First Nations FM community radio that was first given broadcasting approval in 2003.

=== Local newspapers ===
- The Nawash Ezhiwebag: What is happening, a biweekly newsletter published by the Chippewas of Nawash Unceded First Nation.
- Winter Count, a Neyaashiinigmiing history newsletter.
- Dibaudjimoh, a periodic newspaper published from at least 1997 to January 2004 that is no longer publishing.

== Culture ==
The Chippewas of Nawash hold a traditional powwow every year, the Annual Neyaashiinigmiing Traditional Pow Wow, in Cape Croker Park. The 40th iteration of the powwow took place in 2025.

The Chippewas of Nawash is also the home of musician Ira Nadjiwon, Marc Merilainen (Nadjiwon), Jacques Pigeon, Kevin (The Hooch) Lavalley, and Bryden "Gwiss" Kiwenzie who grew up on Nawash. They are also home to an award-winning powwow singers group called the Chippewa Travellers.

== Notable members ==
- Kateri Akiwenzie-Damm, poet, founder of Kegedonce Press
- John Borrows (b. 1963), Professor Borrows, B.A., M.A., J.D., LL.M. (Toronto), Ph.D. (Osgoode Hall Law School), LL.D. (Hons.)(Dalhousie) F.R.S.C., is Canada Research Chair in Indigenous Law at the University of Victoria Law School.
- Basil H. Johnston (1929-2015), writer and educator, residential school survivor
- Verna Patronella Johnston, author (Tales of Nokomis) and community organizer in Toronto during the 1960s and 1970s
- Lenore Keeshig-Tobias, author (Emma and the Trees and Bird Talk) and major advocate for Indigenous writers in Canada
- Bryden Gwiss Kiwenzie, musician
- Michelle LaVallee, curator, artist, and educator
- Naomi Smith, artist
- Clifford Solomon, television actor
- Mary Spencer (b. 1984), Canadian, World Champion, Pan AM, and Olympic middleweight boxer
