= Robinson Treaties =

1850 British treaties with Ojibwa in Canada

The Robinson Treaties are two treaties signed between the Ojibwa chiefs and the Crown in 1850 in the Province of Canada. The first treaty involved Ojibwa chiefs along the north shore of Lake Superior, and is known as the Robinson Superior Treaty. The second treaty, signed two days later, included Ojibwa chiefs from along the eastern and northern shores of Lake Huron, and is known as the Robinson Huron Treaty. The Wiikwemkoong First Nation claim they did not sign either treaty.

The Saugeen Surrenders of 1854 and the Pennefather Treaty of 1859 altered the original treaties.

== Robinson Superior Treaty ==
The Robinson Treaty for the Lake Superior region, commonly called Robinson Superior Treaty, was entered into agreement on September 7, 1850, at Sault Ste. Marie, Ontario, between Ojibwa Chiefs inhabiting the Northern Shore of Lake Superior from Pigeon River to Batchawana Bay, and The Crown, represented by a delegation headed by William Benjamin Robinson. It is registered as the Crown Treaty Number 60.

The Schedule of Reservations created as a result of the Robinson Huron Treaty and signed by the subscribing Chiefs and Principal Men are as follows:

FIRST—Joseph Pean-de-chat and his Tribe, the reserve to commence about two miles from Fort William (inland), on the right bank of the River Kiminitiquia; thence westerly six miles, parallel to the shores of the lake; thence northerly five miles, thence easterly to the right bank of the said river, so as not to interfere with any acquired rights of the Honorable Hudson's Bay Company.

SECOND—Four miles square at Gros Cap, being a valley near the Honorable Hudson's Bay Company's post of Michipicoton, for Totominai and Tribe.

THIRD—Four miles square on Gull River, near Lake Nipigon, on both sides of said river, for the Chief Mishimuckqua and Tribe.

== Robinson Huron Treaty ==
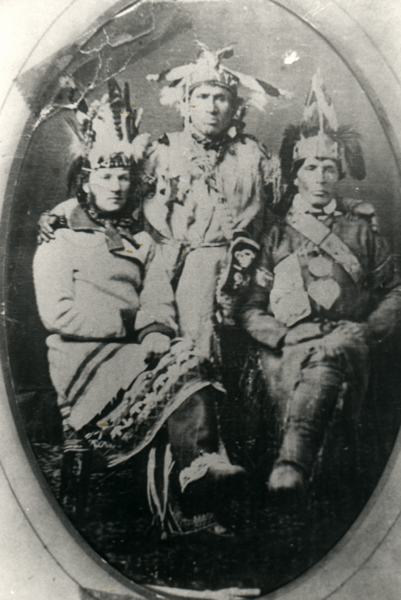
William B. Robinson (left), Chief Shingwauk (centre) and Chief Nebenaigoching (right) at the signing of the Robinson Treaty, 1850

The first Robinson Treaty for the Lake Huron region, commonly called Robinson Huron Treaty, was entered into agreement on September 9, 1850, at Sault Ste. Marie, Ontario, between Ojibwa Chiefs inhabiting the Northern Shore of Lake Superior from Batchawana Bay to Sault Ste. Marie and the Ojibwa Chiefs inhabiting the eastern and northern shores of Lake Huron from Sault Ste. Marie to Penetanguishene, and The Crown, represented by a delegation headed by William Benjamin Robinson. It is registered as the Crown Treaty Number 61.

These principal men on behalf of their respective Tribes or Bands, voluntarily surrendered, ceded, granted, and convey unto Her Majesty, her heirs and successors for ever, all their right, title, and interest to, and in the whole of, the territory above described, together with the Islands in the said Lakes, opposite to the Shores thereof, and inland to the Height of land which separates the Territory covered by the charter of the Honorable Hudson Bay Company from Canada; as well as all unconceded lands within the limits of Canada West to which they have any just claim, of the other part, save and except for the reservations set forth in the schedule.

The annuity provision of both treaties is subject to an augmentation clause under which the annuities could increase if the land subject to the treaties was sufficiently productive and without loss to the Crown. The annuities were never increased since they were capped at $4 per person in 1874. Litigation between the First Nations and the Crown over the failure to augment the annuities is ongoing. The potential damages owed to the First Nations for failure to honor the augmentation clause has been estimated to be in the billions of dollars (Canadian).

The bands were given a one-time payment of £2,160 (equivalent to £343,131.43 or US$438,554.49 in 2024) distributed amongst themselves, and an annual payment of £600 to each band.

The Schedule of Reservations created as a result of the Robinson Huron Treaty and signed by the subscribing Chiefs and Principal Men are as follows:

FIRST—Pamequonaishcung and his Band, a tract of land to commence seven miles, from the mouth of the River Maganetawang, and extending six miles east and west by three miles north.

SECOND—Wagemake and his Band, a tract of land to commence at a place called Nekickshegeshing, six miles from east to west, by three miles in depth.

THIRD—Kitcheposkissegan (by Papasainse), from Point Grondine westward, six miles inland, by two miles in front, so as to include the small Lake Nessinassung a tract for themselves and their Bands.

FOURTH—Wabakekik, three miles front, near Shebawenaning, by five miles inland, for himself and Band.

FIFTH—Namassin and Naoquagabo and their Bands, a tract of land commencing near Qacloche, at the Hudson Bay Company's boundary; thence westerly to the mouth of Spanish River; then four miles up the south bank of said river, and across to the place of beginning.

SIXTH—Shawenakishick and his Band, a tract of land now occupied by them, and contained between two rivers, called Whitefish River, and Wanabitaseke, seven miles inland.

SEVENTH—Windawtegawinini and his Band, the Peninsula east of Serpent River, and formed by it, now occupied by them.

EIGHTH—Ponekeosh and his Band, the land contained between the River Mississaga and the River Penebewabecong, up to the first rapids.

NINTH—Dokis and his Band, three miles square at Wanabeyakokaun, near Lake Nipissing and the island near the Fall of Okickandawt.

TENTH—Shabokishick and his Band, from their present planting grounds on Lake Nipissing to the Hudson Bay Company's post, six miles in depth.

ELEVENTH—Tagawinini and his Band, two miles square at Wanabitibing, a place about forty miles inland, near Lake Nipissing.

TWELFTH—Keokouse and his Band, four miles front from Thessalon River eastward, by four miles inland.

THIRTEENTH—Mishequanga and his Band, two miles on the lake shore east and west of Ogawaminang, by one mile inland.

FOURTEENTH—For Shinguacouse and his Band, a tract of land extending from Maskinongé Bay, inclusive, to Partridge Point, above Garden River on the front, and inland ten miles, throughout the whole distance; and also Squirrel Island.

FIFTEENTH—For Nebenaigoching and his Band, a tract of land extending from Wanabekineyunnung west of Gros Cap to the boundary of the lands ceded by the Chiefs of Lake Superior, and inland ten miles throughout the whole distance, including Batchewanaung Bay; and also the small island at Sault Ste. Marie used by them as a fishing station.

SIXTEENTH—For Chief Mekis and his Band, residing at Wasaquesing (Sandy Island), a tract of land at a place on the main shore opposite the Island; being the place now occupied by them for residence and cultivation, four miles square.

SEVENTEENTH—For Chief Muckatamishaquet and his Band, a tract of land on the east side of the River Naishconteong, near Pointe aux Barils, three miles square; and also a small tract in Washauwenega Bay—now occupied by a part of the Band—three miles square.

== Reserve size ==
The First Nations signatories of this treaty were unfamiliar with the unit of the mile, and assumed it was the size of a league. The treaty gave each band a reserve of 16 square miles, which was much smaller than what the signatories expected. As soon as the error was noticed, the first nations notified the Crown of the issue, and surveyors corrected the problem except for a few reserves, such as the Gull Bay First Nation, considered too far and too remote. The Gull Bay First Nation filed a claim with the government of Canada on the issue of the size of their reserve in 2016.

== Supreme Court Ruling ==
On July 26, 2024, the Supreme Court of Canada issued a unanimous decision regarding the Robinson Treaties. The court ruled that for the past 150 years, the governments of Ontario and Canada had made a "mockery" of their treaty obligations to the Anishinaabe of the upper Great Lakes.

The ruling focused on the ongoing failure to increase the annual per-head resource extraction revenues since 1875 for the residents of two First Nations groups. The court stated that this failure has undermined the honour of the Crown.

Key points from the ruling include:

1. The court did not award a specific settlement but set out the obligations of the Crown to negotiate an increase to resource revenues retrospectively and into the future.
2. The ruling emphasized that the Crown must increase the annuity under the Robinson treaties beyond $4 per person retrospectively, from 1875 to the present.
3. The court ordered the Ontario and federal governments to use a standard of honour when striking future revenue-sharing agreements with the Huron and Superior Anishinaabe.
4. For the Superior Anishinaabe, who had taken their claim to the Ontario Superior Court, the Supreme Court ordered that the settlement ruling remain unreleased for six months to allow time for negotiation.
5. If no agreement is reached within six months, the Crown must determine an amount to compensate the Superior plaintiffs for past breaches.

The court emphasized the need for the parties to "return to the council fire and rekindle the perpetual relationship that the Robinson treaties envision," stating that this is necessary to demonstrate the Crown's commitment to reconciliation.

== Saugeen Surrenders ==
The second Robinson Treaty for the Lake Huron region, commonly called Surrender of the Saugeen Peninsula or Saugeen Surrenders, was entered into agreement on October 13, 1854, at Saugeen between Ojibwa Chiefs inhabiting the Saugeen (Bruce) Peninsula, led by Chief Waabadik, and the Crown, represented by a delegation headed by Laurence Oliphant. It is registered as the Crown Treaty Number 72. Though not negotiated by William Benjamin Robinson, thus not a "Robinson Treaty", it is commonly included with them.

The Chippewas of Saugeen Ojibway Territory initially refused to relinquish entitlement of their Saugeen and Owen Sound Indian Reserve and negotiations for this land became increasingly difficult for the British government. In the end the British government threatened that if the Ojibway did not agree the Crown would be unable to guarantee protection from the European settlers moving into the area. After tense negotiations the Ojibway reluctantly agreed to surrender their reserve in exchange for "the interest on the principal sum arising out of the sale of the land". Five smaller reserves were to be set aside in perpetuity:

1. Saugeen Tract
2. Chief's Point
3. Owen Sound
4. Cape Croker
5. Colpoy's Bay

A historical plaque, erected by the Province of Ontario, provides the following summary of developments during that era. (Location: Allenford, picnic area on the south side of Highway 21 just west of Allenford Road.) The plaque reads as follows:

In July, 1855, at nearby "Floodwood Crossing" (now Allenford), representatives of the Ojibwa Indians conferred with government officials at a meeting later called the "Allenford Pow-Wow". The conference resolved a boundary dispute which had arisen over the terms of the Saugeen treaty of 1854. The Ojibwa interpretation of this treaty held "Copway's Road", an Indian pathway from Saugeen village to Lake Huron, to be the boundary of the land ceded by them on the north side of the Saugeen River. Lord Bury, Superintendent General of Indian Affairs and the government's principal representative, accepted this interpretation which granted the Indians increased frontage on Lake Huron and removed a major source of friction.

The lands have been distributed to the Chippewas' successor First Nations as follows:

| Saugeen First Nation | Chippewas of Nawash Unceded First Nation |
|---|---|
Saugeen and Cape Croker Fishing Islands 1
| Chief's Point 28; Saugeen 29; Saugeen Hunting Grounds 60A | Neyaashiinigmiing 27; Cape Croker Hunting Ground 60B |

== Pennefather Treaty ==
The Pennefather Treaty was signed on 9 June 1859 at Gros Cap between the "Chiefs and Warriors of Batchewananny Bay and Goulais Bay Band of Indians", and the Crown. The chiefs and warriors agreed to relinquish to the Crown the reserved lands set aside in the Robinson Treaty (Reserve 15), save for Whitefish Island. The Crown, in return, would sell the land, and all interest accrued from the sale of the land would be distributed to band members annually. Each family could receive 40 acres of land on the Garden River reserve, and may purchase 80 acres of the land being sold at the selling price (with government-established conditions). The bands were also given $1,200 divided amongst themselves, and all "improvements" to the lands being sold could be compensated after survey.

== List of Robinson Treaty First Nations ==
- Animbiigoo Zaagi'igan Anishinaabek First Nation (Robinson Superior)
- Atikameksheng Anishnawbek First Nation (Robinson Huron)
- Batchewana First Nation (Robinson Huron, Pennefather)
- Biinjitiwaabik Zaaging Anishinaabek First Nation (Robinson Superior)
- Bingwi Neyaashi Anishinaabek First Nation (Robinson Superior)
- Dokis First Nation (Robinson Huron)
- Fort William First Nation (Robinson Superior)
- Garden River First Nation (Robinson Huron, Pennefather)
- Gull Bay First Nation (Robinson Superior)
- Henvey Inlet First Nation (Robinson Huron)
- Long Lake 58 First Nation (Robinson Superior)
- Magnetawan First Nation (Robinson Huron)
- Michipicoten First Nation (Robinson Superior)
- Mississauga First Nation (Robinson Huron)
- Chippewas of Nawash Unceded First Nation (Saugeen Surrenders)
- Netmizaaggamig Nishnaabeg (Robinson Superior)
- Nipissing First Nation (Robinson Huron)
- Pays Plat First Nation (Robinson Superior)
- Red Rock Indian Band (Robinson Superior)
- Red Sky Métis Independent Nation (Robinson Superior) (Note: The Red Sky Métis Independent Nation bases its claim to Robinson Treaty rights as the descendants of the 84 "half-breeds" individually listed in the Robinson-Superior Treaty, but are considered Métis, not First Nation.)
- Sagamok Anishnawbek First Nation (Robinson Huron)
- Saugeen First Nation (Saugeen Surrenders)
- Serpent River First Nation (Robinson Huron)
- Shawanaga First Nation (Robinson Huron)
- Sheshegwaning First Nation (Robinson Huron)
- Temagami First Nation (Robinson Huron) (Note: In 1991, the Supreme Court of Canada ruled that the Teme-Augama Anishnabai gave up rights to the land via the 1850 Robinson Treaty despite the Tema-Augama Anishnabai claiming that they never signed or consented to the treaty.)
- Thessalon First Nation (Robinson Huron, Pennefather)
- Wahnapitae First Nation (Robinson Huron)
- Wasauksing First Nation (Robinson Huron)
- Whitefish River First Nation (Robinson Huron)
- Whitesand First Nation (Robinson Superior)
