= Saugeen and Cape Croker Fishing Islands 1 =

- Unceded territory
- Saugeen & Cape Croker Fishing Isl. Indian Reserve No. 1
- Location within Southern Ontario
- Coordinates: 44°57′49″N 81°25′31″W
- Country: Canada
- Province: Ontario
- County: Bruce
- First Nations: Chippewas of Nawash and Saugeen

Area
  - Land: 10.1 ha (25 acres)

Saugeen and Cape Croker Fishing Islands 1 is a First Nations reserve consisting of 89 islands in Lake Huron off the western coast of the Bruce Peninsula in Ontario. They extend north of Chief's Point 28 for 11 miles (18 km) up to Pike Bay. These islands are shared between the Chippewas of Nawash Unceded First Nation and Saugeen First Nation.

== History ==
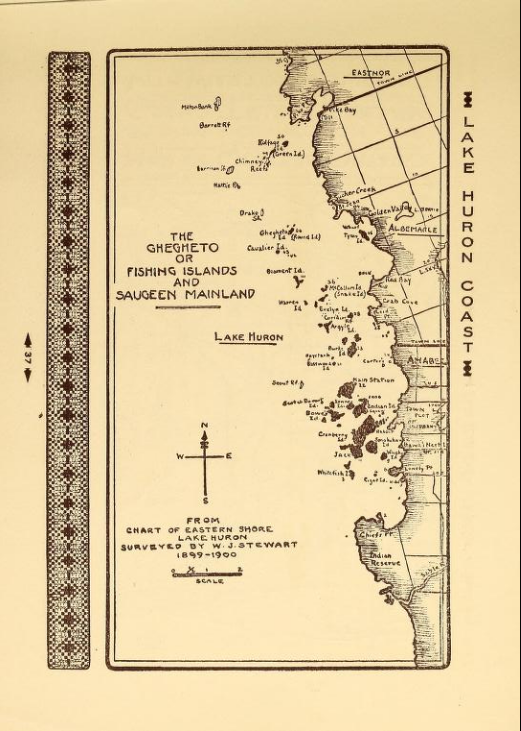
Saugeen Fishing Islands, as depicted in a 1900 chart

Fishing activity has been observed on the Bruce Peninsula as far back as 1000 BC, in the Archaic period. In the Late Woodland period, there is evidence for both Algonquian and Iroquoian peoples being present and fishing in the area. Around the time of European contact, the Petun and Ottawa peoples were known to be fishing there. They were displaced by the Iroquois during the Beaver Wars of the late 17th Century, but the area was reclaimed by Algonquian peoples—principally Chippewa—after 1701.

Written accounts of the Native fishing activity were made as early as 1788. Local factors of the Hudson's Bay Company at La Cloche Island (Note: east of Manitoulin Island) also made records of it, and trading activity began to occur in 1818 at the mouth of the Saugeen River.

When the Chippewas surrendered the Bruce Peninsula under the Saugeen Surrenders of 1854, they retained title to the surrounding islands to sustain their fishing activities. The fish were reported to be abundant, and were mainly caught in the Smokehouse Channel, Indian Channel and the Gut, and being smoked on Smokehouse Island.

European settlers would later participate in the fishing as well. Alexander Macgregor of Goderich would be the first to do so in 1831, establishing his headquarters on Main Station Island. (Note: He would receive a licence of occupation, which allowed him to establish fishing stations in the islands.) Seine fishing was the principal technique that was in use, and gillnet and pound net fishing were employed as well later on.

In 1834, Macgregor was displaced by the Niagara Fishing Company (in which William "Tiger" Dunlop was a part owner), which secured the sole licence for the Islands. The Company would sell its licence in 1848 to several local fishermen in Southampton.

In October 1885, these islands were surrendered under Treaties 222 and 223, in which they were described as:

...those certain parcels or tracts of land and premises situate, lying and being in the Georgian Bay and Lake Huron and Province of Ontario, containing by admeasurement, be the same more or less, and being composed of all the islands owned by the said Band in Lake Huron and Georgian Bay, and known as the Saugeen Fishing Islands and Cape Hurd Islands, (Note: The latter of which is now part of Fathom Five National Marine Park) and extending from Chief's Point, Lake Huron, to Cabot's Head, Georgian Bay, excepting Barrier, Griffith and Hay Islands. (Note: All located in Colpoy's Bay on the Georgian Bay side of the Peninsula, to the east of Wiarton. They were surrendered in 1899.)

The islands were described as being "fronted by a continuous shallow bank, extending in some cases to [1.5 miles (2.4 km)] offshore, but outside this bank the water is good and soon deepens to [10 fathoms (18 m)]."

In 1968, the title to 89 of the smaller islands in the group, totalling 10.1 hectares (25 acres) in area, was returned to Chippewa control.
