= Cape Croker Hunting Ground 60B =

- Unceded territory
- Cape Croker Hunting Ground Indian Reserve No. 60B
- Location within Southern Ontario
- Coordinates: 45°11′N 81°29′W
- Country: Canada
- Province: Ontario
- County: Bruce
- First Nation: Chippewas of Nawash

Area
  - Land: 7.9 km^{2} (3.1 sq mi)

Cape Croker Hunting Ground 60B is a reserve located on the Bruce Peninsula bordering the Bruce Peninsula National Park. It is one of the reserves of the Chippewas of Nawash Unceded First Nation.
