= Naomi Smith =

Naomi Smith may refer to:

- Naomi Smith (artist), Canadian artist
- Naomi Smith (campaigner), British political campaigner
- Naomi Louise Smith, a British schoolgirl murdered in 1995
