= Thessalon First Nation =

- Band No. 202
- People: Ojibwe
- Treaty: Robinson Huron & Pennefather
- Headquarters: 40 Sugarbush Road, Thessalon
- Province: Ontario

Land
- Main reserve: Thessalon 12
- Land area: 9.42 km^{2} (3.64 sq mi)

Population (2024)
- On reserve: 113
- On other land: 4
- Off reserve: 1116
- Total population: 1233

Government
- Chief: Joseph Wabigwan
- Council: Lisa Boulrice; Roxanne Boulrice; Mary Anne Giguere; Robert H. Simon; Robert S. Simon

Tribal Council
- Anishinabek Nation; Mamaweswen, The North Shore Tribal Council

Website
- https://www.thessalonfirstnation.ca/

Thessalon 12
- Indian reserve
- Thessalon Indian Reserve No. 12
- Location within Ontario
- Coordinates: 46°15′N 83°25′W
- Country: Canada
- Province: Ontario
- District: Algoma
- First Nation: Thessalon

Area
  - Land: 9.79 km^{2} (3.78 sq mi)

Population (2011)
  - Total: 108
  - Density: 11/km^{2} (28/sq mi)
- Time zone: UTC-5 (EST)
  - Summer (DST): UTC-4 (EDT)

Thessalon First Nation is an Ojibwe First Nation in Algoma District, Ontario. Their reserve is located at Thessalon 12. They are a member of the Anishinabek Nation.

The traditional territory of Thessalon First Nation was established through extensive use and mutual recognition between Anishinaabe and communities of the area. This was recognized in the Vidal-Anderson Commission report of 1849. Thessalon First Nation's right to use the territory was recognized much earlier by the Crown in the Royal Proclamation of 1763, and in the Treaty of Niagara in 1764. The traditional territory reserved by Thessalon First Nation in the Lake Huron Treaty of 1850.
