= CHFN-FM =

First Nations community radio station in Neyaashiinigmiing, Ontario

Coordinates: 44°56′05″N 81°00′49″W

- Neyaashiinigmiing, Ontario; Canada
- Frequency: 100.1 MHz
- Branding: 100.1 FM

Programming
- Format: community radio

Ownership
- Owner: Chippewas of Nawash

History
- First air date: 2003

Technical information
- Licensing authority: CRTC
- Class: A1
- ERP: 72 watts
- HAAT: 93.7 metres (307 ft)

Links
- Website: nawash.ca

CHFN-FM is a First Nations community radio station that operates at 100.1 FM in Neyaashiinigmiing, Ontario, Canada.

Owned by Chippewas of Nawash, the station was given approval by the Canadian Radio-television and Telecommunications Commission in 2003.
