= Bruce Peninsula National Park =

National park in Ontario, Canada

- Parc national de la Péninsule-Bruce
- IUCN category II (national park)
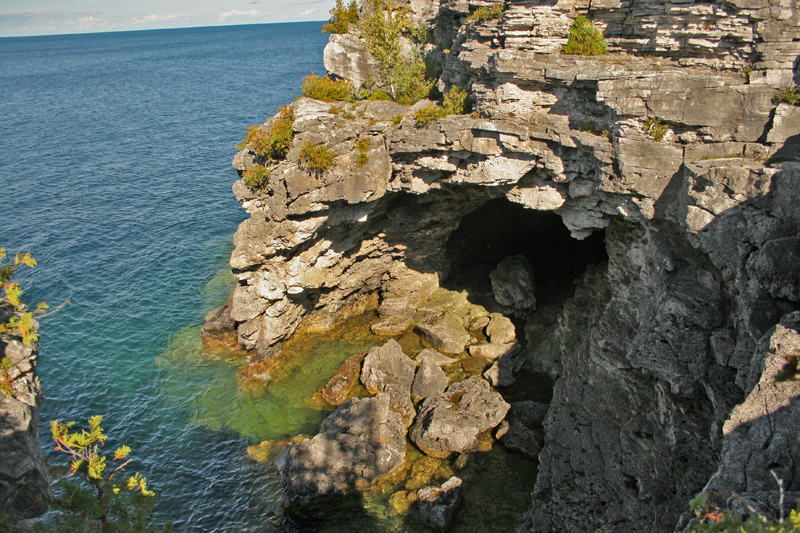
- The Grotto

- Location within Canada Location within Southern Ontario
- Interactive map of Bruce Peninsula National Park
- Location: Ontario, Canada
- Nearest city: Tobermory
- Coordinates: 45°14′20″N 81°36′51″W
- Area: 154 km^{2} (59 sq mi)
- Established: 1987
- Visitors: 460,435 (in 2022–23)
- Governing body: Parks Canada

Bruce Peninsula National Park is a national park on the Bruce Peninsula in Ontario, Canada. Located on a part of the Niagara Escarpment, the park comprises 156 square kilometres and is one of the largest protected areas in southern Ontario, forming the core of UNESCO's Niagara Escarpment World Biosphere Reserve. It was established in 1987 to protect the rock formations and shoreline of the Niagara Escarpment. The park offers opportunities for many outdoor activities, including hiking, camping, boating, and bird watching. The park has trails ranging in difficulty from easy to expert, and connects to the Bruce Trail. Bruce Peninsula National Park is known for its crystal clear blue waters, cobblestone beaches, rocky cliffs and karst formations.

The park is open year-round and offers visitors vistas to view either the sunrise or sunset, the rocks of the Niagara Escarpment, and the wildlife, which includes black bear, many species of birds, wild orchids, massasauga rattlesnake, and much more.

The park was the subject of a short film in 2011's National Parks Project, directed by Daniel Cockburn and scored by John K. Samson, Christine Fellows and Sandro Perri.

The Bruce Peninsula National Park has a weather and tourist information station CBPS-FM which operates at 90.7 FM. The station was launched in the mid-1990s.

Map of the northern end of the Bruce Peninsula.

== Geology ==
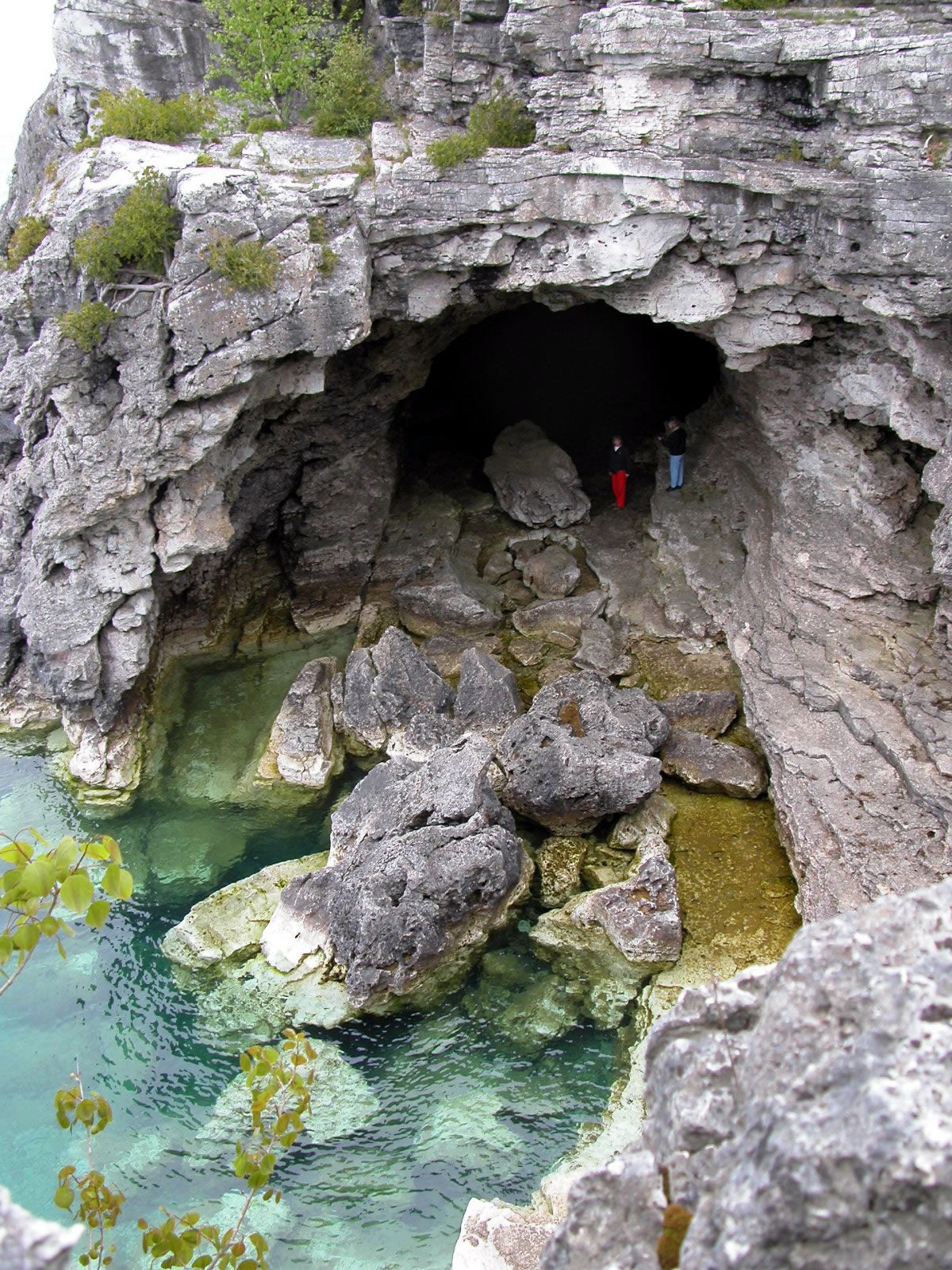
"The Grotto" at Bruce Peninsula National Park

The Niagara Escarpment runs from near Rochester, New York, to Tobermory, then on to Manitoulin, St. Joseph Island and other islands located in northern Lake Huron where it turns westwards into the Upper Peninsula of northern Michigan, south of Sault Ste. Marie. The escarpment then extends southwards into Wisconsin following the Door Peninsula and then more inland from the western coast of Lake Michigan and Milwaukee ending northwest of Chicago near the Wisconsin-Illinois border. It forms the backbone of the Bruce Peninsula and shapes the northern boundary of most of the park and provides the park with some of its most spectacular scenery.

The rock of the escarpment is very old. Approximately 400 million years ago, this area was covered by a shallow tropical sea teeming with life in the form of plant-like animals, crustaceans, living corals and mollusks. It would have looked much like the present-day Great Barrier Reef of Australia. When the sea began to dry up, the minerals dissolved in it became more and more concentrated. Magnesium in the water was absorbed into the limestone, which then became a harder, slightly different sort of rock, called dolomite.

The harder dolomite forms much of the rock of the escarpment cliffs along Bruce Peninsula National Park's Georgian Bay shoreline. At Niagara Falls, the dolomite "caprock" is more resistant to erosion than the rock below it, creating the sculptured cliffs for which the area is famous. Since the last ice age, water levels in the region have undergone great changes. Softer limestone has been eroded away by water action, leaving magnificent overhanging cliffs at various points along the shore. These are the big attraction of the Cyprus Lake trails. Where erosion has cut more deeply, caves have been formed, such as the famed "Grotto" on the shore between the Marr Lake and Georgian Bay Trails. Great blocks of dolomite, undercut by wave action, have tumbled from the cliffs above and can be clearly seen below the surface of the deep, clean waters of Georgian Bay.

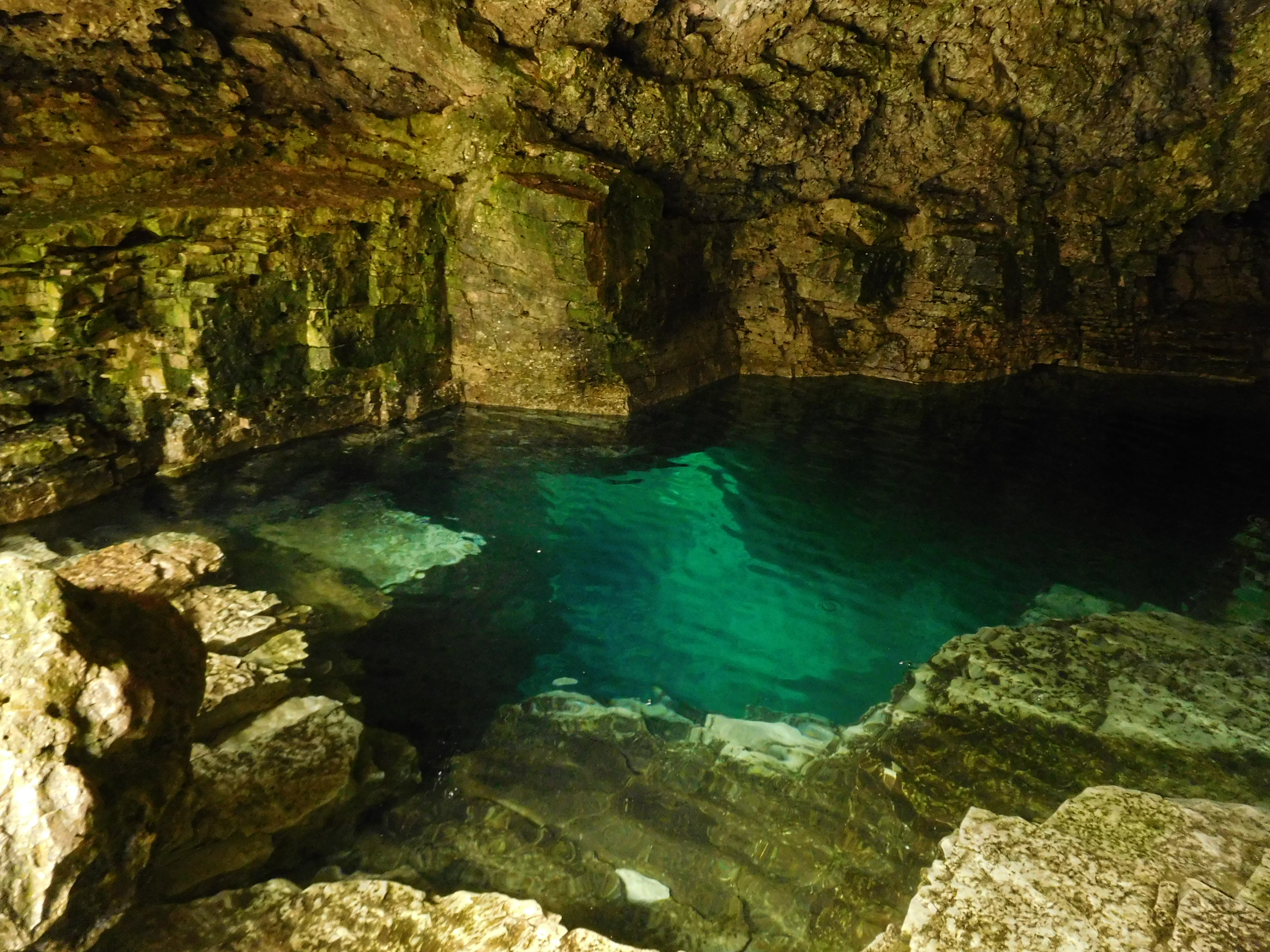
A photo taken inside of the Grotto

== Climate ==
The park has a typical climate for lakeside Northern Ontario, though the surrounding bodies of Lake Huron moderate the temperates. The park has a humid continental climate (Dfb), with warm to hot summers and cool winters. In the coastal northern parts of the peninsula, the climate is among the most temperate in Ontario. The climate of the park is influenced by both Georgian Bay and Lake Huron, which significantly moderate temperatures. As a result, they tend to prolong milder temperatures in the fall and cooler temperatures in spring. Summers are warm, with an average temperature of 16.8 °C (62.2 °F) while winters are cool, averaging −6.7 °C (19.9 °F). Summers are dominated by hot, humid air masses from the Pacific Ocean and the Gulf of Mexico. In winter, Pacific air masses predominate, bringing in warm and humid air although cold, dry air from the Arctic highs can occur, bringing in colder and drier conditions. Warm air masses coming from the Gulf of Mexico are rare during winter but are responsible for bringing January and February thaws. Spring and fall are characterized by complex weather patterns with contrasting and rapidly changing influences from the different regional air masses. The park receives 900 mm (35 in) of precipitation per year. This is evenly distributed throughout the year with fall (September–November) being the wettest.Precipitation is slightly lower than inland areas due to the limited influence that the narrow peninsula has when air masses travel over it compared to more interior locations.

== Fauna ==
Animals that inhabit this national park are chipmunks, squirrels, red foxes, raccoons, coyotes, black bears, porcupines, snowshoe hares, skunks, white-tailed deer, snakes and frogs. The park is an important habitat for massasauga rattlesnakes and one of the last places where they can be found.

== Flora ==
A variety of natural habitats are found in the park. These include mixed-wood forests, wetlands, alvars, talus slopes, and cliffs. The park is known for its wildflowers and has many species of algae, mosses, and lichen. There are over 32 species of ferns and 34 species of orchids that are found in the park, including the eastern prairie fringed orchid, which is one of the rarest species native to North America. The park hosts half of the world's dwarf lake iris, which is considered a vulnerable species. Forest cover includes eastern white cedar, spruce, fir, birch, poplar, maple, and beech.

== Activities ==
Bruce Peninsula National Park is open year-around with limited services during the off-season. The park offers many activities such as hiking, swimming, bouldering, camping, canoeing, and kayaking. During the winter season, activities such as cross-country skiing, snowshoeing, and winter camping are also available. Bruce Peninsula National Park was designated a Dark Sky Preserve in 2009 and is one of three places in southern Ontario where visitors can stargaze in naturally dark skies.

== Visitors' centre ==
In 2006, a new visitors' centre opened to serve Fathom Five National Marine Park and the Bruce Peninsula National Park. Designed by Andrew Frontini of Shore Tilbe Irwin + Partners, the CAD $7.82 million centre, approached by a boardwalk, features an information centre, reception area, exhibit hall and theatre. A 20-metre (66 ft) viewing tower was also constructed to provide visitors with aerial views of the surrounding park and Georgian Bay. The centre was designed with environmental sustainability in mind, receiving $224,000 from the Federal House in Order initiative for implementation of innovative greenhouse gas reduction technology.

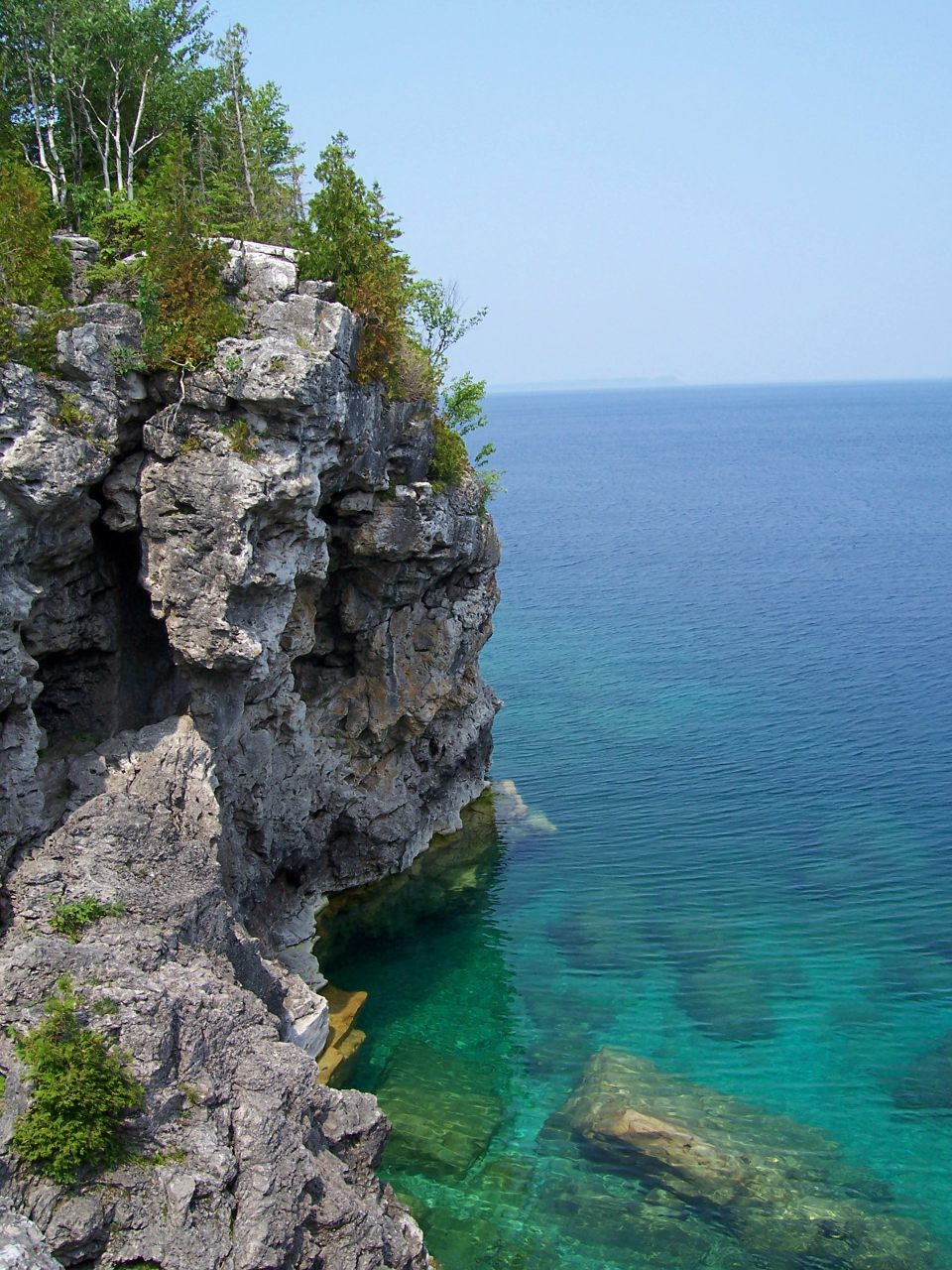
A cliff on the Bruce Trail

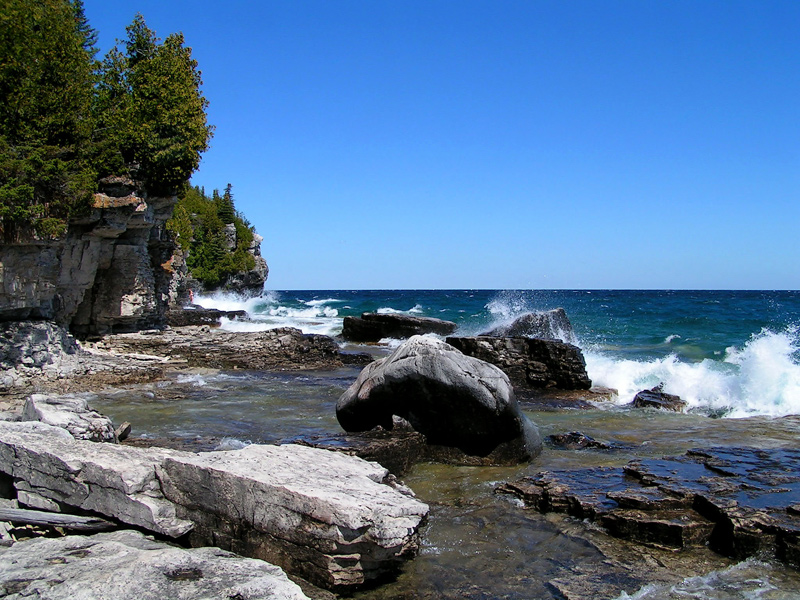
On the shore of Georgian Bay

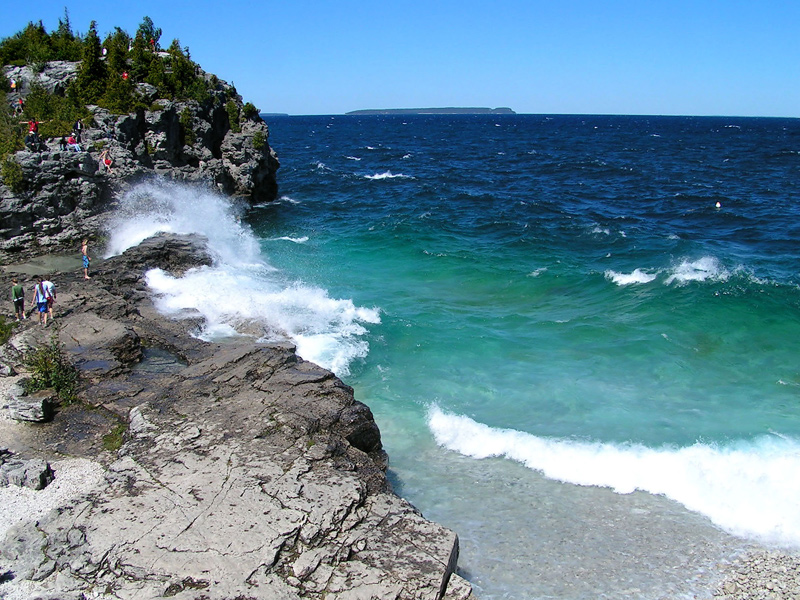
View toward Fathom Five National Marine Park

"The Grotto"

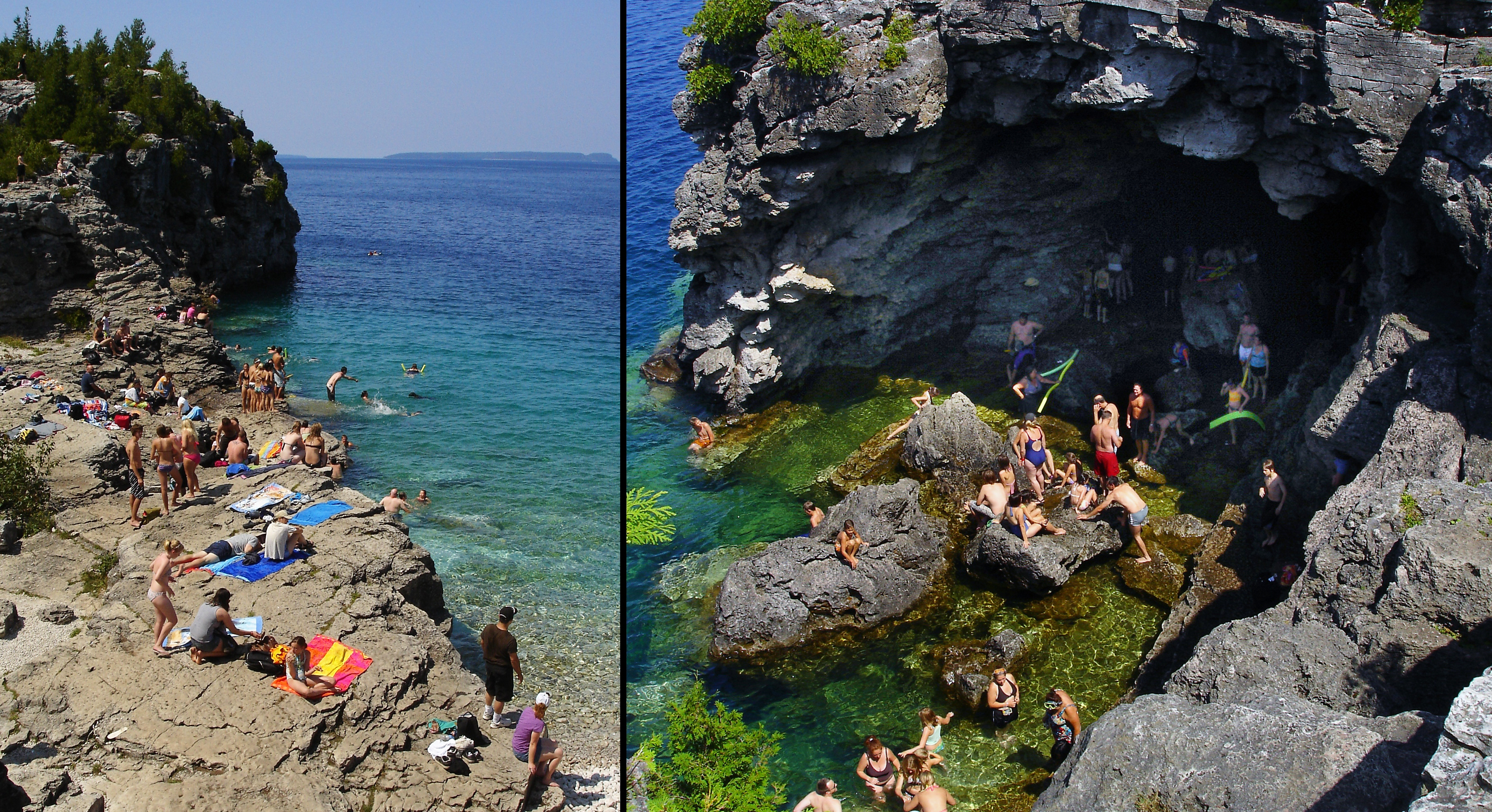
"The Grotto" and nearby rocks crowded with mid-summer vacationers

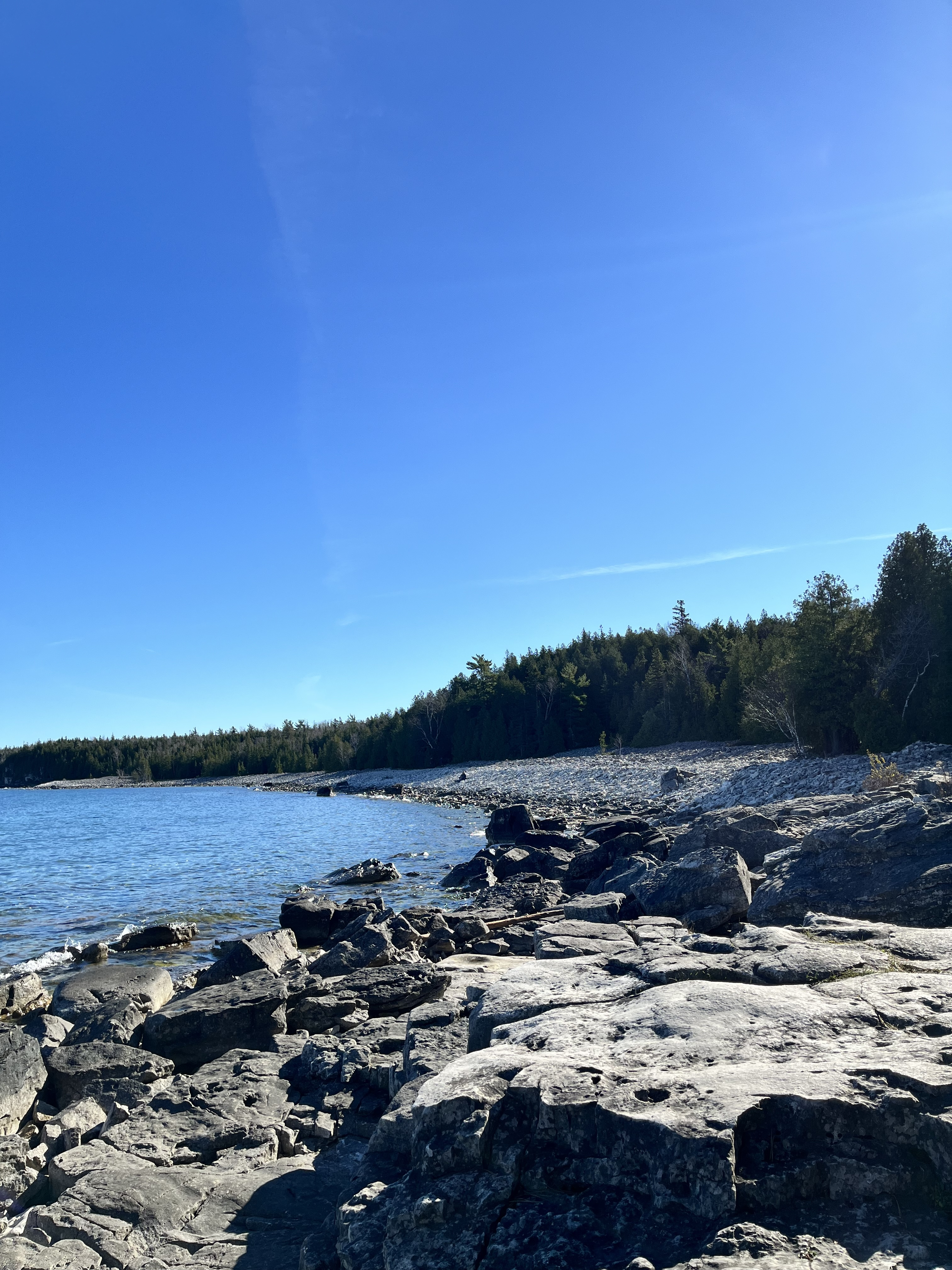
Boulder Beach in Bruce Peninsula National Park, Ontario

== See also ==
- National Parks of Canada
- List of National Parks of Canada
