= Saugeen First Nation =

Ojibway First Nation in Ontario, Canada

- People: Ojibway
- Province: Ontario

Land
- Main reserve: Saugeen 29

Government
- Chief: Conrad Ritchie

Saugeen First Nation is an Ojibway First Nation in Bruce County, Ontario, Canada. Its principal reserve, Saugeen 29, is situated near the mouth of the Saugeen River on Lake Huron, near Southampton. Together with the Chippewas of Nawash Unceded First Nation, it forms the Saugeen Ojibway Nation, whose traditional territory encompasses the Bruce Peninsula and adjacent areas of southwestern Ontario.

The history of Saugeen First Nation is closely associated with a series of nineteenth-century treaties concerning the lands of the Saugeen Ojibway. Disputes concerning the interpretation and implementation of these agreements have continued into the twenty-first century. In 2023, the Ontario Superior Court ruled that a section of the shoreline at Sauble Beach formed part of the Saugeen reserve; the ruling was upheld on appeal, and in August 2025 the Supreme Court of Canada declined to hear a further appeal.

== History ==
=== Saugeen Ojibway and the nineteenth-century treaties ===
Historian Peter Schmalz places the Saugeen communities within the broader history of the Ojibwa of southern Ontario, whose political, economic and territorial relations changed substantially during the eighteenth and nineteenth centuries as British settlement expanded.

In August 1836, representatives of the Saugeen Ojibway entered into an agreement with Lieutenant-Governor Francis Bond Head. The agreement, commonly known as the Saugeen Tract Agreement or Treaty 45½, concerned a large area south of the Bruce Peninsula. Under its recorded terms, lands were transferred to the Crown while territory on and around the peninsula remained for the Saugeen Ojibway.

A further agreement, Treaty 72, was concluded in 1854. It transferred most of the Bruce Peninsula to the Crown while providing for reserved lands for the Saugeen Ojibway communities. The treaty and the implementation of its boundaries subsequently became the subject of disputes between the Saugeen First Nation and the Crown.

In 1855, another recorded surrender concerned lands on the northern shore of Lake Huron. The nineteenth-century agreements resulted in the establishment of reserve communities on substantially smaller areas than the territory previously used by the Saugeen Ojibway.

=== Land and water claims ===
Saugeen First Nation and the Chippewas of Nawash have pursued a number of claims concerning lands and waters within their traditional territory. Together, the two First Nations have litigated questions concerning Aboriginal title, treaty rights, reserve boundaries and the Crown's obligations under nineteenth-century agreements.

One major case concerned claims to Aboriginal title over parts of the lakebed of Lake Huron and Georgian Bay. The Ontario courts rejected the particular Aboriginal-title claim to the submerged lands at issue, while the litigation generated broader legal discussion concerning the application of Canadian Aboriginal-title doctrine to Indigenous relationships with water.

The Saugeen Ojibway Nation has also asserted fishing and other treaty rights in the waters surrounding its territory. These questions have formed part of continuing litigation and negotiations involving the First Nations and the federal and provincial governments.

=== Saugeen Beach boundary dispute ===
A long-running dispute concerned the northern portion of the beach at Sauble Beach. Saugeen First Nation maintained that the disputed shoreline had been reserved to the First Nation under Treaty 72 but was subsequently omitted from the reserve because of an incorrect nineteenth-century survey.

On 4 April 2023, the Ontario Superior Court of Justice ruled in favour of Saugeen First Nation, finding that the disputed section was part of the reserve and that the Crown had failed to protect the reserve boundary. The Town of South Bruce Peninsula and other appellants challenged the decision.

In December 2024, the Court of Appeal for Ontario upheld the trial judgment. The town subsequently sought leave to appeal to the Supreme Court of Canada. On 28 August 2025, the Supreme Court declined to hear the case, leaving the lower-court decisions in force. Contemporary reporting described the decision as ending a legal dispute that had continued for approximately 35 years.

The shoreline is now referred to by Saugeen First Nation as Saugeen Beach. In July 2025, before the Supreme Court's final disposition of the application for leave to appeal, signage at the beach was changed to reflect that name.

== Government ==
Saugeen First Nation is governed by an elected chief and council. Conrad Ritchie served as chief during the 2024–2026 council term.

In January 2025, Saugeen First Nation and the neighbouring municipality of Saugeen Shores signed their first formal friendship accord. The agreement was presented by the two governments as a framework for continuing cooperation between the communities.

== Reserves ==
The principal community of Saugeen First Nation is Saugeen 29, on the Lake Huron shore near Southampton. Other lands associated with the First Nation include Chief's Point 28, Saugeen Hunting Grounds 60A, and interests in the Saugeen and Cape Croker Fishing Islands 1. The latter is associated jointly with Saugeen First Nation and the Chippewas of Nawash Unceded First Nation.

The reserve system developed from the nineteenth-century treaty arrangements between the Saugeen Ojibway and the Crown.

== Culture and public life ==
Saugeen First Nation forms part of the wider Anishinaabe cultural and political community of the Great Lakes. Scholarship concerning the Saugeen Ojibway has emphasized the continuing importance of relationships among territory, water, law and oral tradition in contemporary Anishinaabe political and cultural life.

The First Nation participates with the Chippewas of Nawash in the political organization known as the Saugeen Ojibway Nation. In addition to litigation concerning treaty and Aboriginal rights, the two communities have participated in debates concerning resource development, environmental regulation and the governance of Lake Huron and Georgian Bay.

== See also ==
- Chippewas of Nawash Unceded First Nation
- Saugeen Ojibway Nation
- Saugeen Tract Agreement
- Saugeen 29
- Sauble Beach, Ontario
- Ojibwe
