= Naomi Smith (artist) =

First nations artist

- Born: Kitchener, Ontario, Canada
- Known for: beadwork artist

Naomi Smith is a First Nations artist, curator and educator known for creating and raising awareness about the history of traditional Indigenous beadwork.

== Early life ==
Born in Kitchener, Ontario, Smith is a member of the Chippewas of Nawash Unceded First Nation. One of thousands of Indigenous children removed from their families by the Canadian government during the Sixties Scoop, she was taken from her mother at 8 weeks of age and adopted by a non-Indigenous family. Her adoptive family encouraged an exploration of her indigenous roots and she began beading at the age of 7. Smith reconnected with her birth mother, who was also an artist, as an adult and discovered that they shared a passion for beadwork.

== Beadwork ==
Smith was first drawn to beadwork as a child and is a predominantly self-taught artist. Her own work is rooted in traditional practice and incorporates natural materials including sweet grass, birch bark and porcupine quill. She was featured as a First Nations artist at the 2010 Vancouver Olympics.

A custodian of traditional beadwork, Smith has collected and exhibited pieces at various museums as a way of educating people about the practice. Smith curated her first show, Spirit Seeds: A Celebration of First Nations Beadwork, at the Peel Art Gallery, Museum and Archives in 2014. It featured beadwork from her personal collection of artifacts, including beaded bags and Iroquois smoking caps dating to as early as the mid-1800s, along with contemporary pieces by Smith and fellow Indigenous artists. In addition to her beadwork and exhibition work, Smith offers educational workshops focused on traditional Woodlands culture.

Smith is the 2018 Folk Artist-in-Residence for the Schneider Haus National Historic Site in Kitchener. As part of the residency she has curated the exhibit Baggage - Carrying On Between Two Worlds.
