= Saugeen Ojibway Nation =

First Nation collective in Ontario, Canada

Saugeen Ojibway Nation (Ojibwe: Saugeen Anishnaabek, SON) is the name applied to Chippewas of Nawash Unceded First Nation and Saugeen First Nation as a collective, represented by a joint council. The collective First Nations are Ojibway (Anishinaabe) peoples located on the eastern shores of Lake Huron on the Bruce Peninsula in Ontario, Canada. Though predominantly Ojibway, due to large influx of refugees from the south and west after the War of 1812, the descendants of the Chippewas of Saugeen Ojibway Territory also have ancestry traced to Odawa and Potawatomi peoples.

The traditional territory of the Saugeen Ojibway Nation is the Saugeen Ojibway Territory (Ojibwe: Saukiing Anishnaabekiing). Though only two First Nation governments are successors apparent to the Saugeen Ojibway Nation, there are seven different First Nation communities who lived, fished, hunted and traded in Saugeen Ojibway Territory. The story of each of their communities from past to present realities are best told by their own people. Oral tradition carries those stories and their descendants are still alive.

== History ==
=== Origins ===
At one time, both by oral history and archaeological evidence, all of the modern Bruce Peninsula (or the "Saugeen Peninsula" as referred by the Ojibway) was home to the Chippewas of Saugeen Ojibway Territory. From time immemorial, hunting and fishing were plentiful in this area. Archaeologist are able to find artifacts from Early Woodland Period (1000 BCE to 1000 CE) calling the culture that left artifacts in the Saugeen Ojibway Territory as the Saugeen complex. Other than pottery, the projectile points called Saugeen Point are typical characteristics of the Saugeen culture. Consequently, associated with both the Chippewas of Saugeen Ojibway Territory and the Saugeen complex peoples were winter camps around Owen Sound, Cape Croker and the Collingwood area, as well as summer camps in Walkerton, Wiarton, Goderich, Tobermory and Red Bay. Traditional territory also included all of the Saugeen River watershed. Thus, places such as Tobermory, Meaford, Goderich, Cape Croker, Owen Sound and Orangeville are located in the traditional Saugeen Ojibway Nation Territory. The permanent settlement at the outlet of the Saugeen River which lent its name to the region and its people was called Zaagiing, meaning "at the river's outlet," i.e. "at the mouth of the river.

The Chippewas of Saugeen Ojibway Territory are a member of the Council of Three Fires of the Ojibway, Odawa and Potawatomi Nations. The Confederacy came to help in the Battle of Skull Mound and in the Battle of Blue Mountain. Though the Council of Three Fires often fought against the Iroquois Confederacy (or the Naadowe as they are called in the Anishinaabe language), the Chippewas of Saugeen Ojibway Territory peacefully shared the territory with the Wyandotte/Wendat Nation who also made the area their home. The Ojibway Nation called the Wendat peoples Nii'inaa-Naadowe ("The 'Nadowe' within our homeland"), but the French referred to them as "Huron" and lent their name to the Lake.

People from many nations moved into Saugeen Ojibway Territory after the War of 1812. They came from Ohio and from the State of New York. As a result of the American Indian Removal Policies of the 1830s more people came from Michigan and Wisconsin. Some were on their way to the Manitoulin Island project. Some moved from Coldwater on the Narrows. Others came from the Toronto and Niagara regions after European and Loyalist newcomers affected their territory. Due to these influxes of people from other areas, the history of the original Chippewas of Saugeen Ojibway Territory is often confused with that of other Anishinaabeg who settled in Saugeen Ojibway Territory after the American Revolution. In addition, often confused together are the histories of those Anishinaabeg who settled in Cape Croker in 1854 with the history of the original Chippewas of Saugeen Ojibway Territory.

=== Treaties ===
One of the earliest documents recognizing Nation to Nation relations between the Crown and Indigenous peoples, the Royal Proclamation of 1763 stated "Indian land" could only be sold to the Crown. However, the document did not differentiate between those who were the original resident of the land cession in question and those who settled as part of the refugee migration, which has caused long-held animosity among the Anishinaabe communities located in the Saugeen Ojibway Territory.

In the Saugeen Surrenders, the Saugeen and Owen Sound Indian Reserve was ceded to The Crown. However, five smaller areas were reserved for the Chippewas of the Saugeen Ojibway Territory.

== Member First Nations ==
=== Saugeen First Nation ===
The major hereditary successor to the original people of the Chippewas of Saugeen Ojibway Territory is that of the Saugeen First Nation, as told in the stories of the community that is known as Chippewa Hill. Today, the Saugeen First Nation includes the people living in the communities of Chippewa Hill, Scotch Settlement, French Bay and Chief's Point.

=== Chippewas of Nawash Unceded First Nation ===
The present day Chippewas of Nawash Unceded First Nation includes the people living on Neyaashiinigmiing. Although there are shared histories, contemporary history of the Chippewas of Nawash Unceded First Nation have a separate story from that of the Saugeen First Nation.
