= Saugeen Hunting Grounds 60A =

- Unceded territory
- Saugeen Hunting Grounds Indian Reserve No. 60A
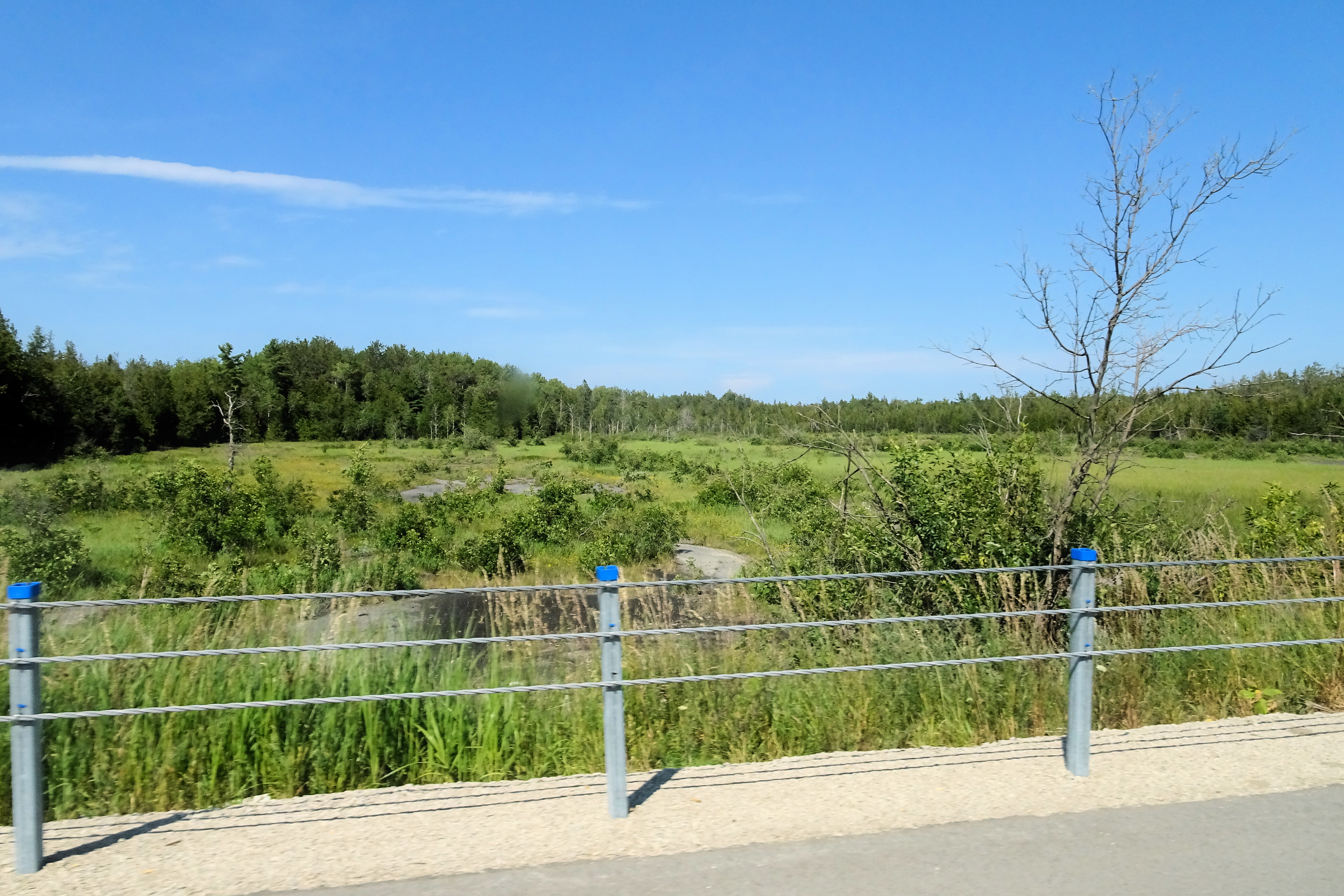

- Location within Southern Ontario
- Coordinates: 45°10′N 81°30′W
- Country: Canada
- Province: Ontario
- County: Bruce
- First Nations: Saugeen

Area
  - Land: 7.28 km^{2} (2.81 sq mi)

Saugeen Hunting Grounds 60A is a First Nations reserve in Bruce County, Ontario. It is one of the reserves of the Saugeen First Nation.
