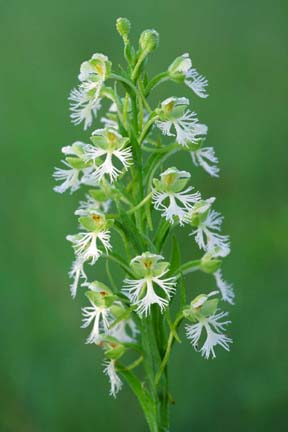

Conservation status
- Least Concern (IUCN 3.1)

- Imperiled (NatureServe)

Scientific classification
- Kingdom: Plantae
- Clade: Embryophytes
- Clade: Tracheophytes
- Clade: Angiosperms
- Clade: Monocots
- Order: Asparagales
- Family: Orchidaceae
- Subfamily: Orchidoideae
- Genus: Platanthera
- Species: P. leucophaea

Binomial name
- Platanthera leucophaea (Nutt.) Lindl. 1835

Synonyms
- Orchis leucophaea Nutt. 1835 (basionym); Orchis leucophoea Nutt. 1835; Habenaria leucophaea (Nutt.) A.Gray; Blephariglottis leucophaea (Nutt.) Rydb.; Fimbriella leucophaea (Nutt.) Butzin

= Platanthera leucophaea =

Eastern prairie fringed orchid

Species of orchid

Platanthera leucophaea, commonly known as the prairie white fringed orchid or eastern prairie fringed orchid, is a rare species of orchid native to North America. It is a federally threatened species, protected since October 30, 1989 under the Endangered Species Act of 1973. In Canada, it has been listed endangered under Schedule 1 of the Species at Risk Act since 2005. In 2014, the International Union for Conservation of Nature assessed it as "least concern."

== Distribution ==
Platanthera leucophaea is found in moist to wet tallgrass prairie, sedge meadows, fens, and old fields. For optimum growth, little or no woody encroachment should be near the habitat. Historically, the eastern prairie fringed orchid is found primarily in the Great Lakes Region with isolated populations in Maine, Virginia, Iowa, and Missouri. A historic record exists for Choctaw County, Oklahoma. The plant has not been observed in Oklahoma in the past 150 years. The major factor in the decline of the eastern prairie fringed orchid has been a loss of habitat due to grazing, fire suppression, and agricultural conversion.

== Description ==
Platanthera leucophaea arises from a fleshy tuber. The plant can grow up to three feet (91 cm) tall. The leaves are long and thin.

The inflorescence is large and showy and may have up to 40 white flowers. It is distinguished from Platanthera praeclara, the western prairie fringed orchid, by its smaller flowers (less than one inch (2.5 cm) long), more oval petals, and a shorter nectar spur.

The eastern prairie fringed orchid is a long-lived perennial. Its tuberous rootstalk helps it survive grass fires. Fires and rain stimulate the plant to grow and flower. The plant emerges each year in May and flowering begins by late June. The flowers are pollinated at night by large sphinx moths. Certain night-flying insects that are attracted to the orchid's fragrance are able to obtain its nectar with their long probosces. Others cannot because of the flower's long, narrow, oddly positioned nectar spur.
