= Saugeen Tract Agreement =

1836 treaty between the Ojibwa and Upper Canada

Saugeen Tract Agreement, registered as Crown Treaty Number 45 1/2, was signed August 9, 1836, between the Saugeen Ojibway and Ottawa and the government of Upper Canada. Sir Francis Bond Head used this occasion for the provincial government's annual distribution of gifts to the Ojibwa and Ottawa of the Saugeen Peninsula (Bruce Peninsula) to negotiate the treaty. In exchange for 1.5 million acres (6,070 km^{2}) of land, the Ojibwa and Ottawa of Saugeen received only a promise to assist and protect Indians who took up residence on the Bruce Peninsula.
