= Bruce Peninsula =

Peninsula in Southern-Mid Ontario, Canada

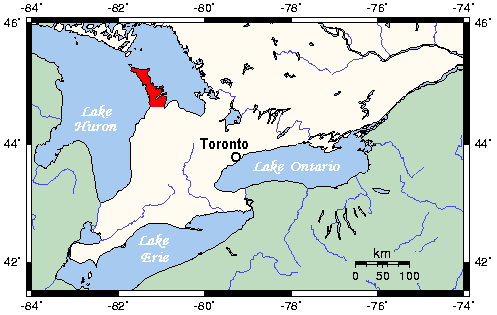
Map of Southern-mid Ontario showing Bruce Peninsula (in red) dividing Lake Huron

The Bruce Peninsula is a peninsula in Ontario, Canada, that divides Georgian Bay of Lake Huron from the lake's main basin. The peninsula extends roughly northwestwards from the rest of Southwestern Ontario, pointing towards Manitoulin Island, with which it forms the widest strait joining Georgian Bay to the rest of Lake Huron. The Bruce Peninsula contains part of the geological formation known as the Niagara Escarpment. The entire peninsula and nearby communities to the south along Lake Huron are located within Bruce County, Ontario.

The peninsula is a popular tourist destination for camping, hiking and fishing, with two national parks (Bruce Peninsula National Park and Fathom Five National Marine Park), more than half a dozen nature reserves, and the Bruce Peninsula Bird Observatory. The Bruce Trail runs through the region to its northern terminus in the town of Tobermory. This region is named after James Bruce, 8th Earl of Elgin (Lord Elgin), Governor General of Canada. Parks Canada now refers to the peninsula as "Saugeen Peninsula" in recognition of its being traditional territories of the Saugeen-Ojibwe nation. However the national park retains the name "Bruce Peninsula National Park" for the time being.

The Bruce Peninsula is a key area for both plant and animal wildlife. Part of the Niagara Escarpment World Biosphere Reserve, the peninsula has the largest remaining area of forest and natural habitat in Southern/mid Ontario and is home to some of the oldest trees in eastern North America. An important flyway for migrating birds, the peninsula is habitat to a variety of animals, including black bear, massasauga rattlesnake, and barred owl.

== History ==
=== 19th century ===
Until the mid-19th century, the area known as the Bruce Peninsula was territory controlled by the Saugeen Ojibwe Nations. The nations included the Chippewas of Nawash Unceded First Nation and Saugeen First Nation. Historical and archaeological evidence from the area concludes that at the time of first contact with Europeans, the peninsula was inhabited by the Odawa people, from whom a large number of local native people are descended. Oral history from Saugeen and Nawash suggests their ancestors have been here as early as 7500 years ago. The area of Hope Bay is known to natives as Nochemoweniing, or Place of Healing.

In 1836 the Saugeen Ojibwe signed a treaty with Sir Francis Bond Head to cede lands south of the peninsula to the Canadian government. In 1854, the Saugeen Ojibwe agreed to sign another treaty – this time for the peninsula itself. In 1994, after decades on increasing First Nations activism, the Saugeen Ojibwe filed a suit for a land claim for part of their traditional territory; they claimed breach of trust by the Crown in failing to meet its treaty obligations to protect Aboriginal lands. The claim seeks the return of lands still held by the Crown and financial compensation for other lands. This claim is still active.

European settlement began on the peninsula in the mid-19th century, despite its poor potential for agricultural development. Attracted by the rich fisheries and lush forest, settlers found the land known then as the "Indian or Saugeen Peninsula" to be irresistible. In 1881, settlers built the first sawmill on the peninsula in Tobermory. In less than 20 years, most of the valuable timber was gone, and timber industry jobs declined. Fuelled by the waste left behind by the rapid logging and land clearances, intense forest fires sprang up around the peninsula in 1908, burning large swaths of land. By the mid-1920s, the formerly abundant forests of the peninsula were nearly barren. When the lamprey eel was accidentally introduced to the Great Lakes in 1932, the devastation on the fish supply made the peninsula a less attractive place to live; many left when fish stocks became depleted. The peninsula underwent a steady decline in population until the 1970s. In the late 20th century, the peninsula started to attract a new kind of resident: the cottager. Today, seasonal residents outnumber permanent residents, especially in the summer.

=== Natural history of the Bruce Peninsula and the Niagara Escarpment ===
In its southern Ontario portion, the Niagara Escarpment is a ridge of rock several hundred metres high in some locations, stretching 725 kilometres (450 mi) from Queenston on the Niagara River, to Tobermory at the tip of the Bruce Peninsula. Today, in Ontario, the Escarpment contains more than 100 sites of geological significance, including some of the best exposures of rocks and fossils of the Silurian and Ordovician periods (405 to 500 million years old) to be found anywhere in the world.

The Niagara Escarpment has origins dating to the Silurian age some 430 to 450 million years ago, a time when the area lay under a shallow warm sea. This sea lay in a depression of the Earth's crust, centered in what is now the lower peninsula of the State of Michigan. Known geologically as the Michigan Basin, the outer rim of this massive saucer-shaped feature governs the location of the Niagara Escarpment, which is shaped like a gigantic horseshoe. The Escarpment can be traced from near Rochester, New York, south of Lake Ontario to Hamilton, north to Tobermory on the Bruce Peninsula. It is covered by the waters of Lake Huron, appearing as Manitoulin Island, then across the Upper Peninsula of Michigan and down the west side of Lake Michigan into the State of Wisconsin.

As occurs with present-day water bodies, such as Hudson Bay or the Gulf of Mexico, rivers flowing into this ancient sea carried sand, silt and clay to be deposited as thick layers of sediment. At the same time, lime-rich organic material from the abundant sea life was also accumulating. Over millions of years these materials became compressed into massive layers of sedimentary rocks and ancient reef structures now visible along the Escarpment. Some rock layers now consist of soft shales and sandstones while others are made up of dolomite (a rock similar to limestone which contains magnesium and is more durable).

Today, fossil remains illustrating the various life forms can be found in many of the rocks as they are slowly exposed by the action of wind, water and ice.

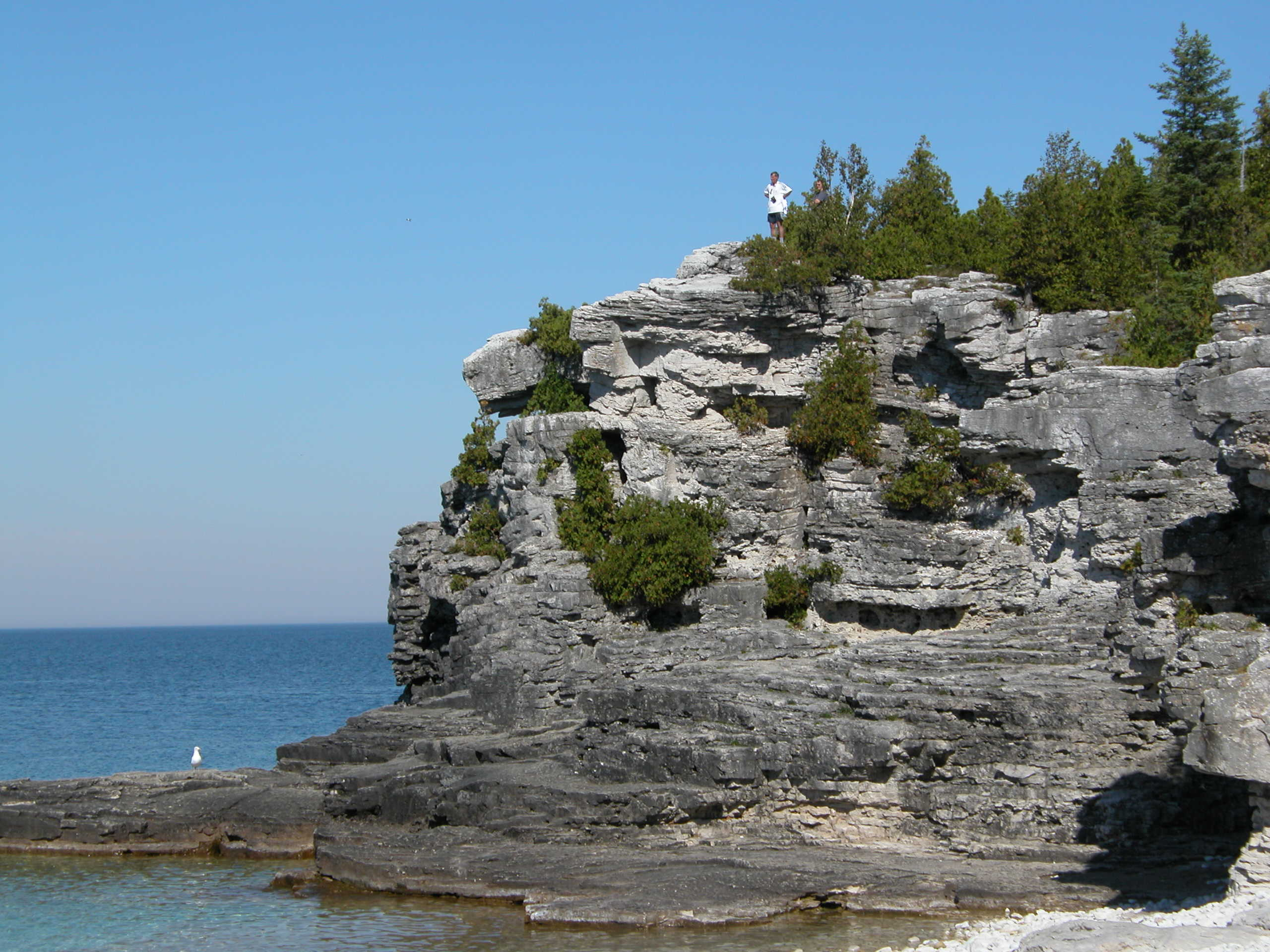
The Niagara Escarpment in the Bruce Peninsula National Park

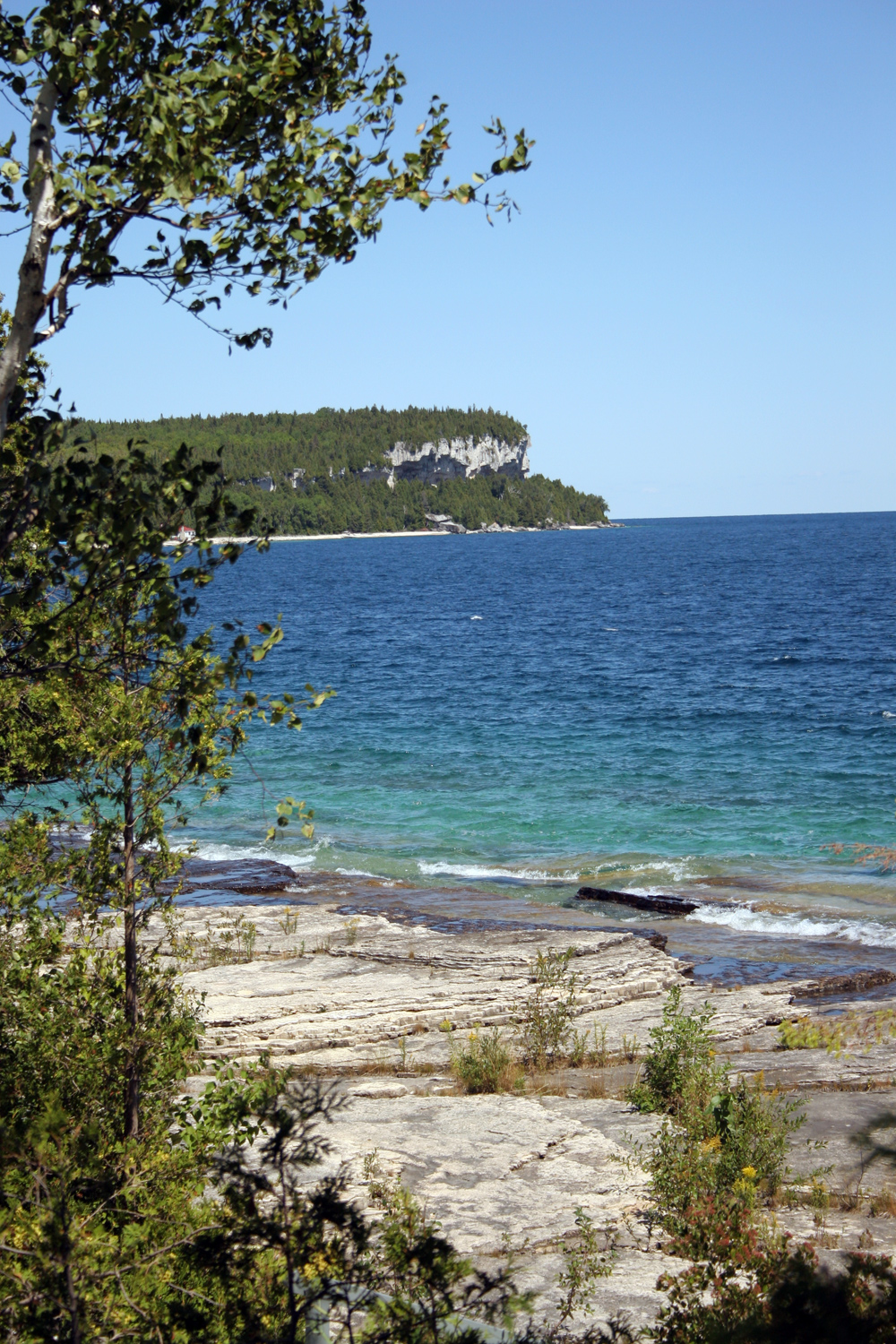
Smokey head White Bluffs near Lion's Head, Ontario

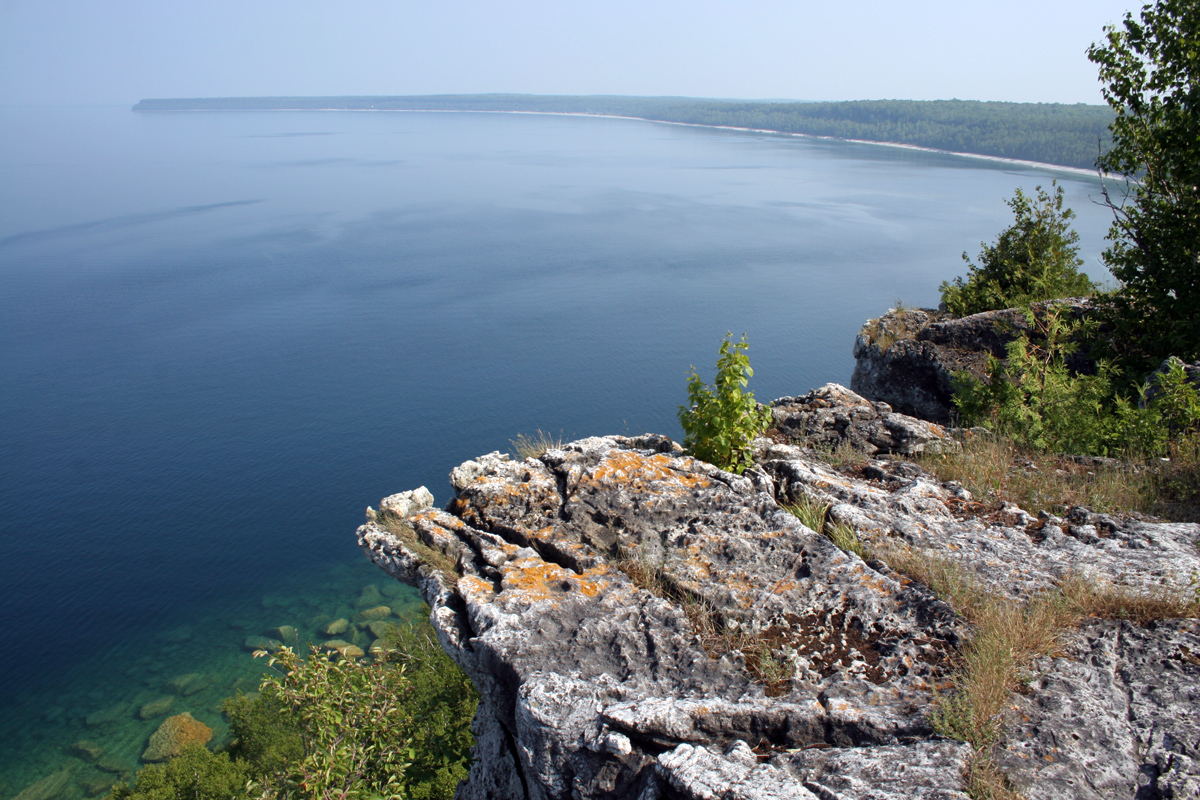
Overlook towards the Niagara Escarpment at Dyer's Bay, Bruce Peninsula

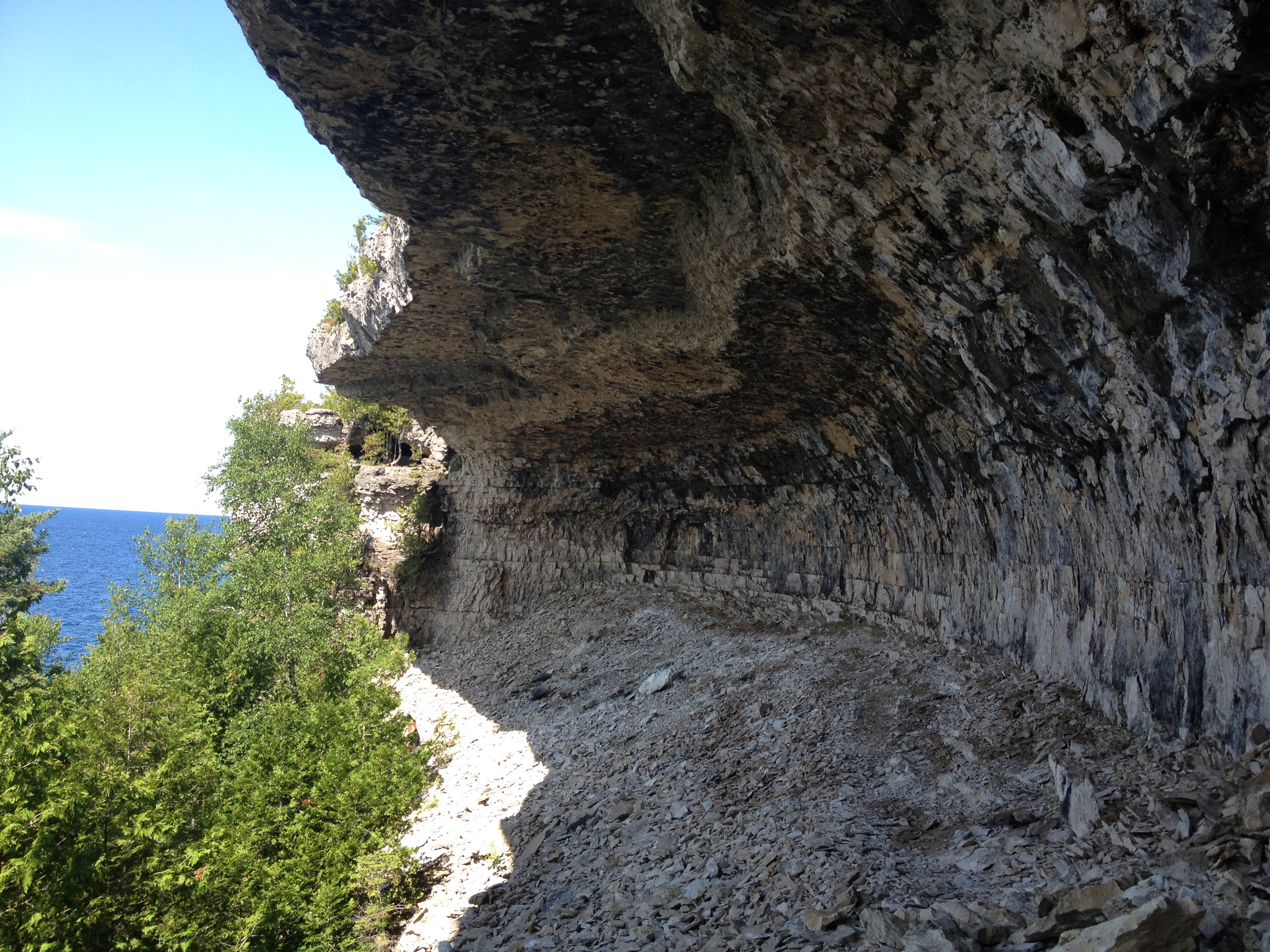
Overhanging Point along the Bruce Trail

=== Indigenous history ===
Saugeen First Nation is an Ojibwe First Nation located along the Saugeen River and Bruce Peninsula in Ontario, Canada. The original territory included all of the Saugeen River watershed and all of the Bruce Peninsula.

Organized in the mid-1970s, during a period of increased political activism, Saugeen First Nation declared itself the primary 'political successor apparent' to the historic Chippewas of Saugeen Ojibway Territory, who had occupied this territory and made treaties with the Crown. However, along with the Saugeen First Nation, the Chippewas of Nawash Unceded First Nation also claims to be the 'political successor apparent' to the Chippewa of Saugeen Ojibway Territory. Under the Saugeen Tract Agreement, the portion south of Owen Sound was ceded to the Crown, with reserves later established on the Bruce Peninsula.

The claims for land and payment of rent on lands discussed in early treaties are significant. The Saugeen is now determined to establish its claim to the waters of Lake Huron and Georgian Bay and any Crown Land remaining on the peninsula. "The two First Nations are claiming aboriginal title to the lands under the water covering an area of Lake Huron and Georgian Bay from south of Goderich, west to the international border and north to the mid-point between the tip of the Bruce Peninsula and Manitoulin Island; then east to the mid-point of Georgian Bay and south to the southernmost point of Nottawasaga Bay." A trial to establish the ownership and resolve disputes over the treaties began in 2019.

== Parks ==
Map of Bruce County.

There are 2 National Parks, 8 Ontario Parks, and 4 Federation of Ontario Naturalists Parks located within the Bruce Peninsula.

- Bruce Peninsula National Park - In the heart of a World Biosphere Reserve, the park contains massive, rugged cliffs inhabited by thousand year old cedar trees. The park is composed of an array of habitats from alvars to dense forests and several small lakes. Together these form a greater ecosystem - the largest remaining chunk of natural habitat in southern Ontario.
- Fathom Five National Marine Park - The waters at the mouth of Georgian Bay are home to Fathom Five - Canada's first National Marine Conservation Area. The park preserves 22 shipwrecks and several historic light stations. Fathom Five's freshwater ecosystem contains some of the most pristine waters of the Great Lakes. The park contains rugged lake bed topography that is popular with scuba divers.

Ontario Parks - include:

- Black Creek
- Ira Lake
- Johnstons Harbour
- Little Cove
- Cabot Head
- Smoky Head
- Lion's Head
- Hope Bay Forest

Federation of Ontario Naturalists - Ontario Nature works to protect and restore the species, spaces and landscapes that represent the full diversity of nature in Ontario.

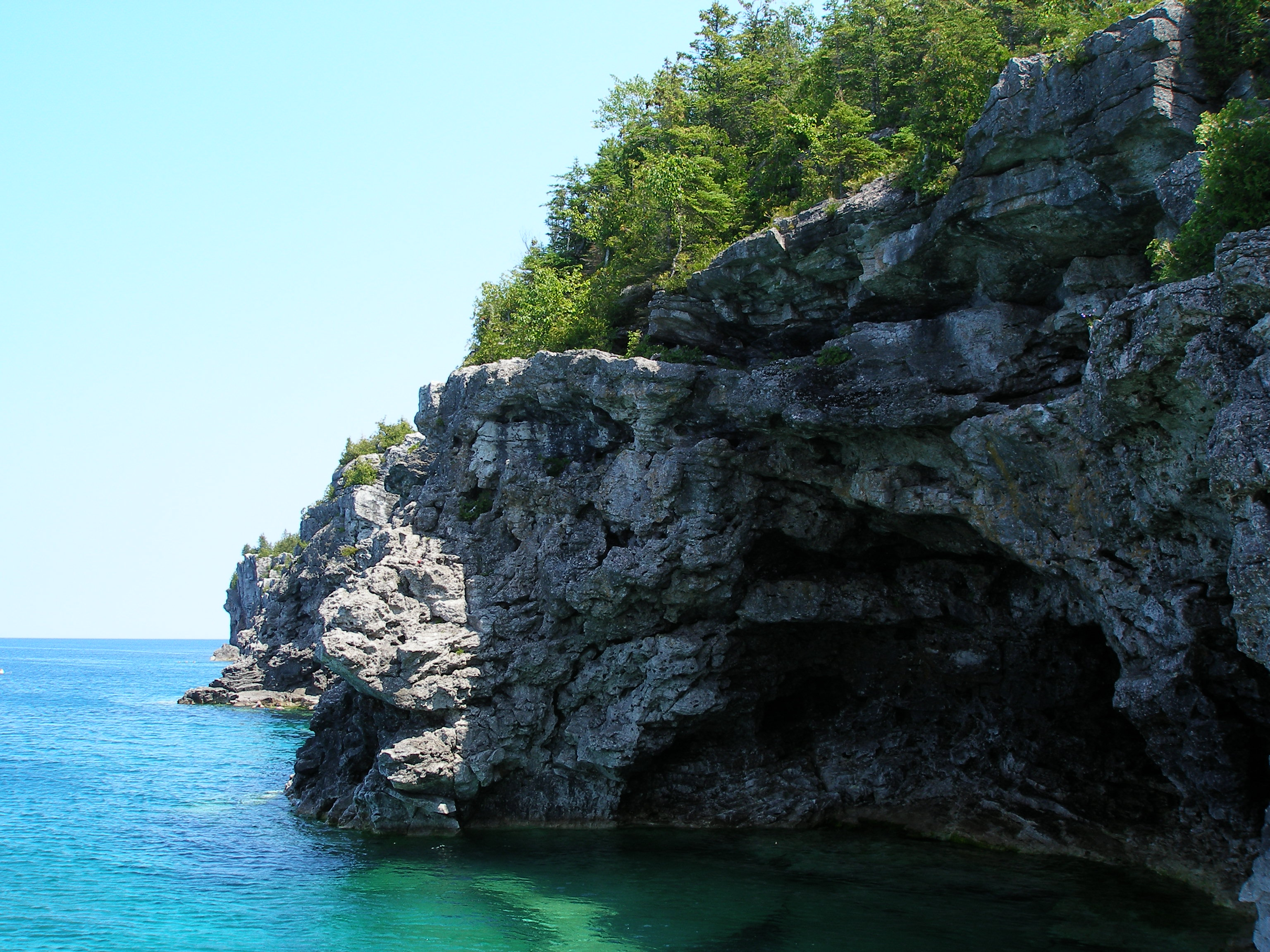
The "Grotto" at the Bruce Peninsula National Park

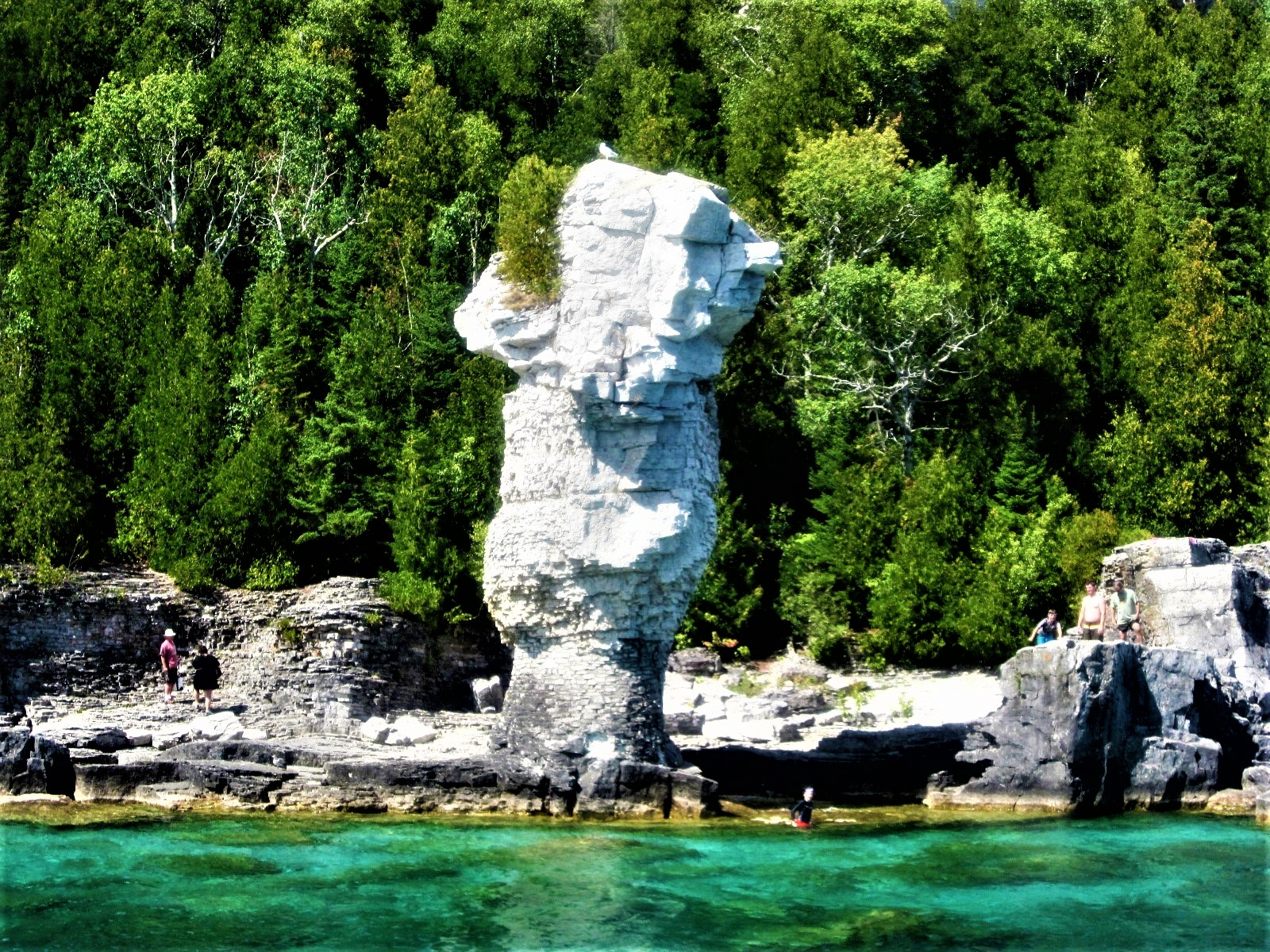
Flowerpot Island, Fathom Five National Marine Park

== Climate and habitat ==
The Bruce Peninsula has a northern temperate climate, with freezing cold winters and mild summers, caused by maritime cooling from Lake Huron.

The peninsula is located in the uppermost section of the greater Great Lakes–St. Lawrence Forest region. The Bruce Peninsula provides a diverse range of forests, with eastern mixed forests/pains in the innermost and southernmost areas, and boreal/hemiboreal forests on the Niagara Escarpment and in the costal/northern areas. Due to almost all of the Bruce Peninsula being in a Snowbelt, the peninsula experiences heavy Lake-effect snow from Lake Huron, often receiving multiple meters of snow per year. Snowfall (including the first few flurries) typically begins around late October and persist well into April, though uncommon flurries can occur in May and early October during cold snaps. On average, sea ice begins to form in early December and melts by late May, with maximum coverage in February.

Despite being below the standard boreal threshold of 50°N, the microclimate around the shores and maritime cooling provides a boreal habitat for wildlife that otherwise don't live at that latitude, including black bears, black spruce, jack pine, moose (now locally extinct) and fishers.

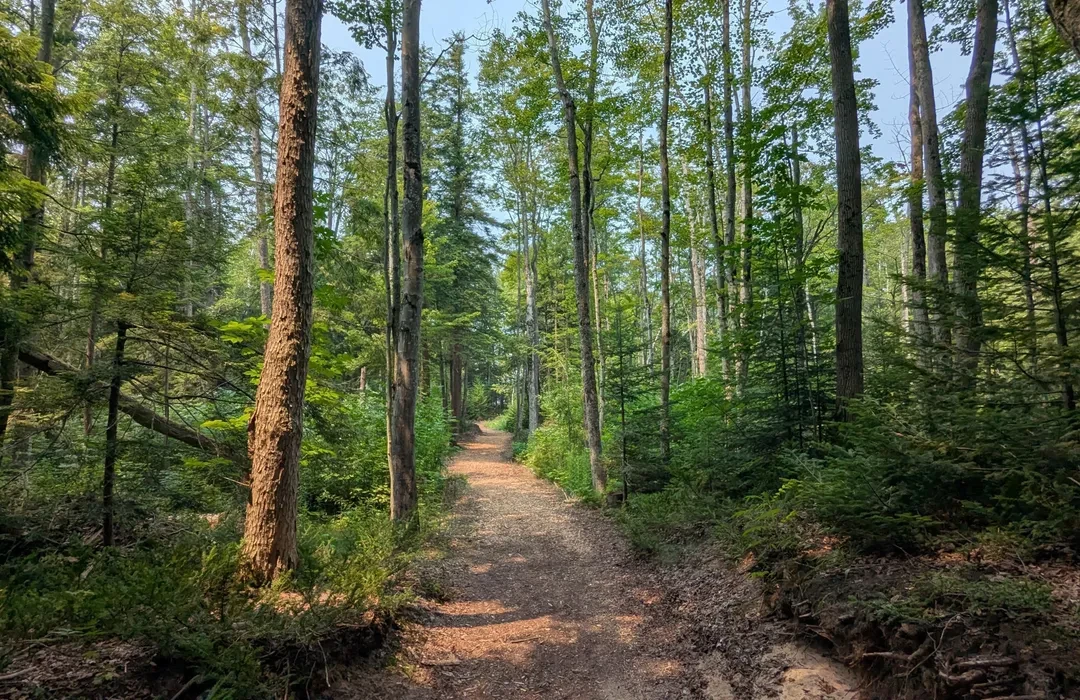
Hemiboreal forests in Southampton

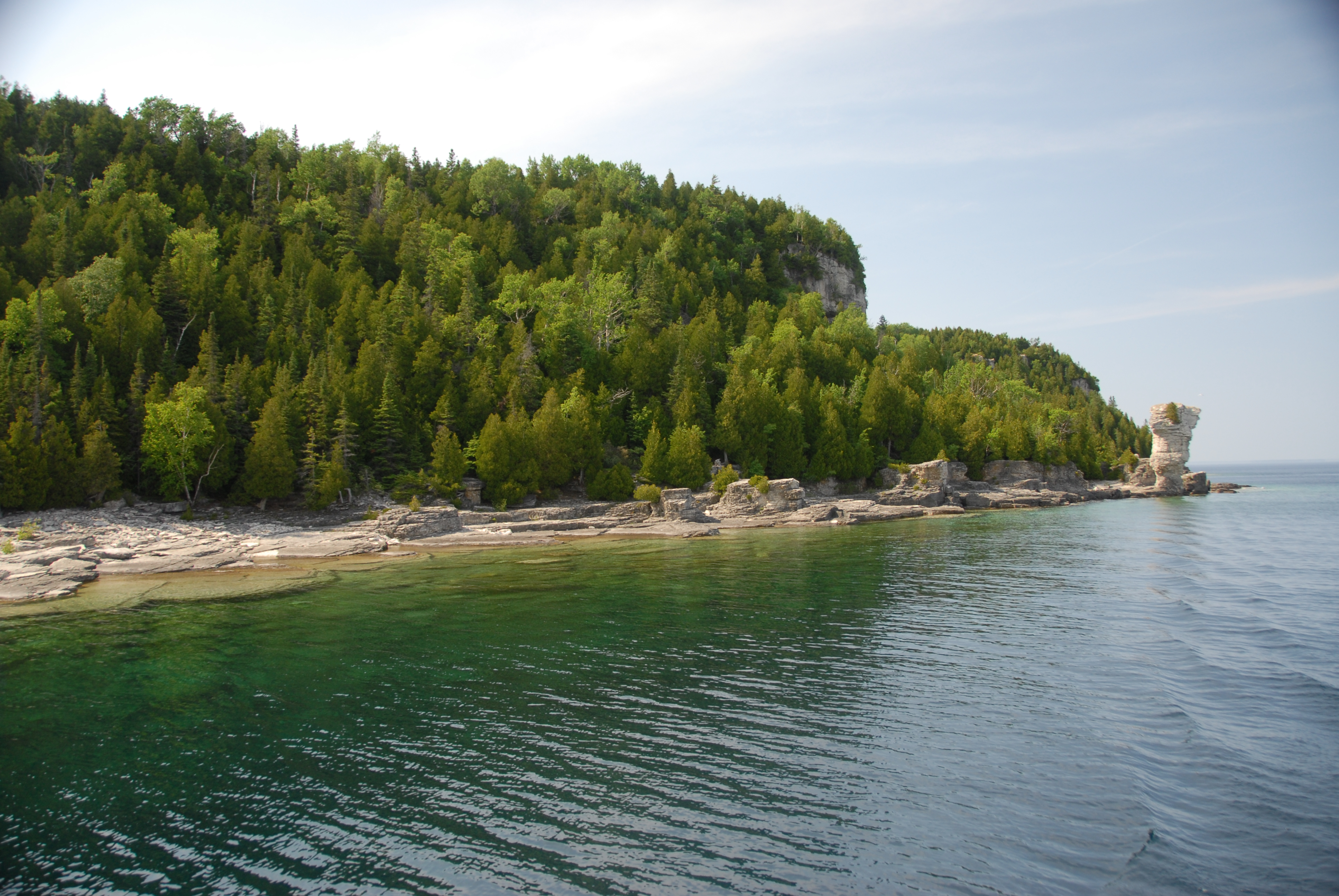
Boreal forests off the coast of Tobermory

== Lighthouses ==
The Bruce Peninsula's shoreline has several lighthouses, necessary to provide guidance to the many ships that would pass by the shores.

The Cove Island Light, located near Tobermory is one of the six famous "Imperial" lighthouses built in the 1850s by John Brown which can be found on the mainland and on nearby islands of the northern Bruce Peninsula.

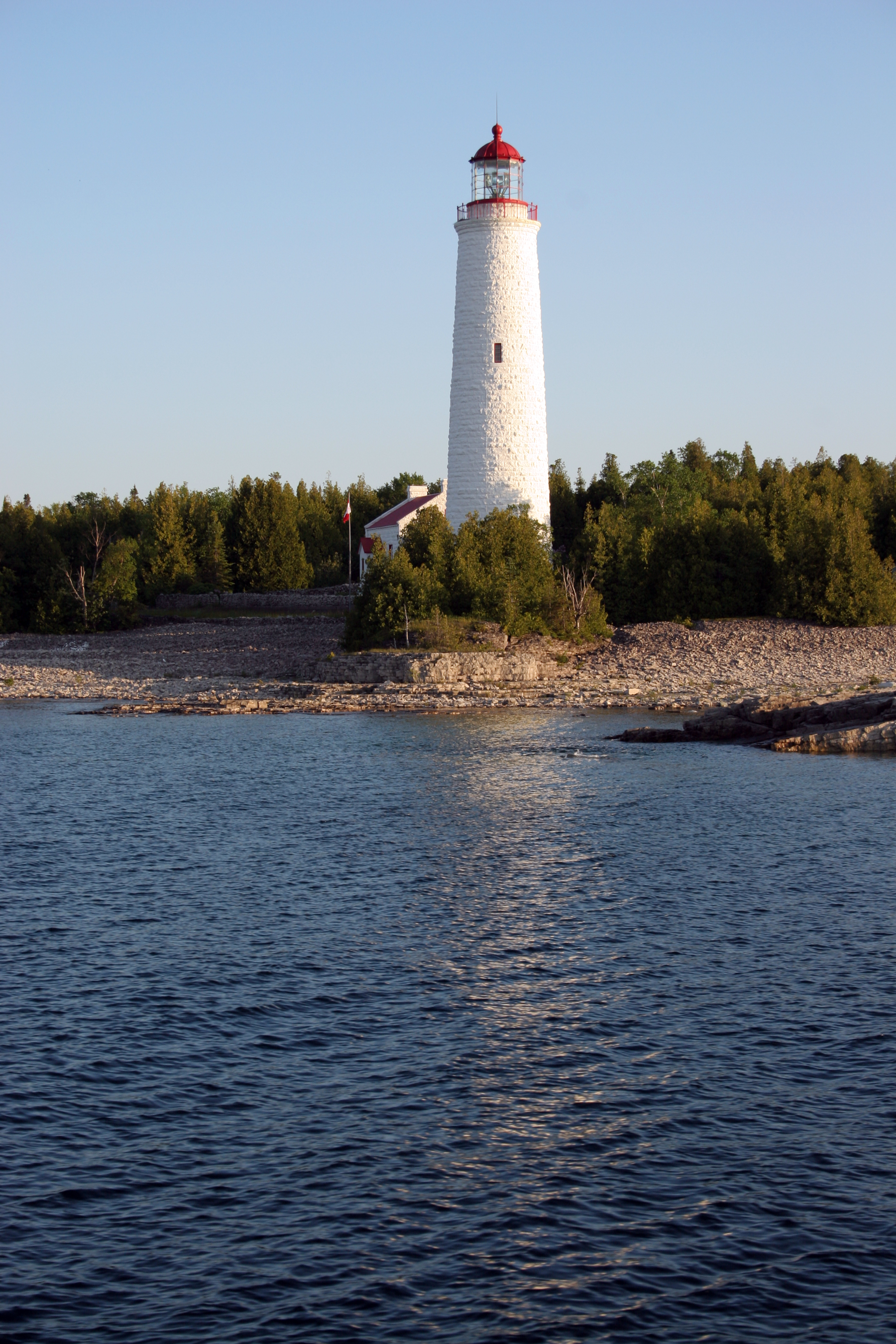
Cove Island Light in the Bruce Peninsula

Other lighthouses include:

- Lion's Head Lighthouse
- Flowerpot Island
- Big Tub Lighthouse
- Knife & Lyal Island Lighthouse
- Cape Croker Lighthouse
- Cabot Head Lighthouse

== Wildlife ==
There are many varieties of wildlife on the Bruce Peninsula, such as the northern flying squirrel, black bear, chipmunk, fisher, long-eared bats, red squirrel, fox, massasauga rattlesnake, red-shouldered hawk, barred owl, hermit thrush, black-throated blue warbler, scarlet tanager, black spruce, jack pine and yellow-spotted salamander.

Past records suggest that strictly-boreal animals such as elk, moose and wolverines once thrived in the area before habitat loss due to fires/human settlement. As of now, no reintroduction/repopulation plans have been implemented.

The Bruce Peninsula is located on a major northern migration route, so many species of birds, such as the bald eagle, have their wintering grounds here.

The highest concentration of nesting birds can be found in the Bruce Peninsula in May and June each year. About 20 species of warblers breed on the peninsula, including the black-throated green, yellow, yellow-rumped, and Blackburnian warblers and the ubiquitous American redstart. They make their summer homes in the extensive wooded areas along the Peninsula. The annual Huron Fringe Birding Festival in May observes the spring migration. The endangered piping plover has made a comeback along the northern shores of Sauble Beach as well, and nest in restricted areas of the beach. These are well marked to prevent visitors overrunning the area and to reduce negative human effects. Migrating hawks also follow the Niagara Escarpment. Hawks travel during the day, and can be seen in the vicinity of Cabot Head in the open areas west of Dyers Bay, and near Tobermory, in April.

== Wildflowers and orchids ==
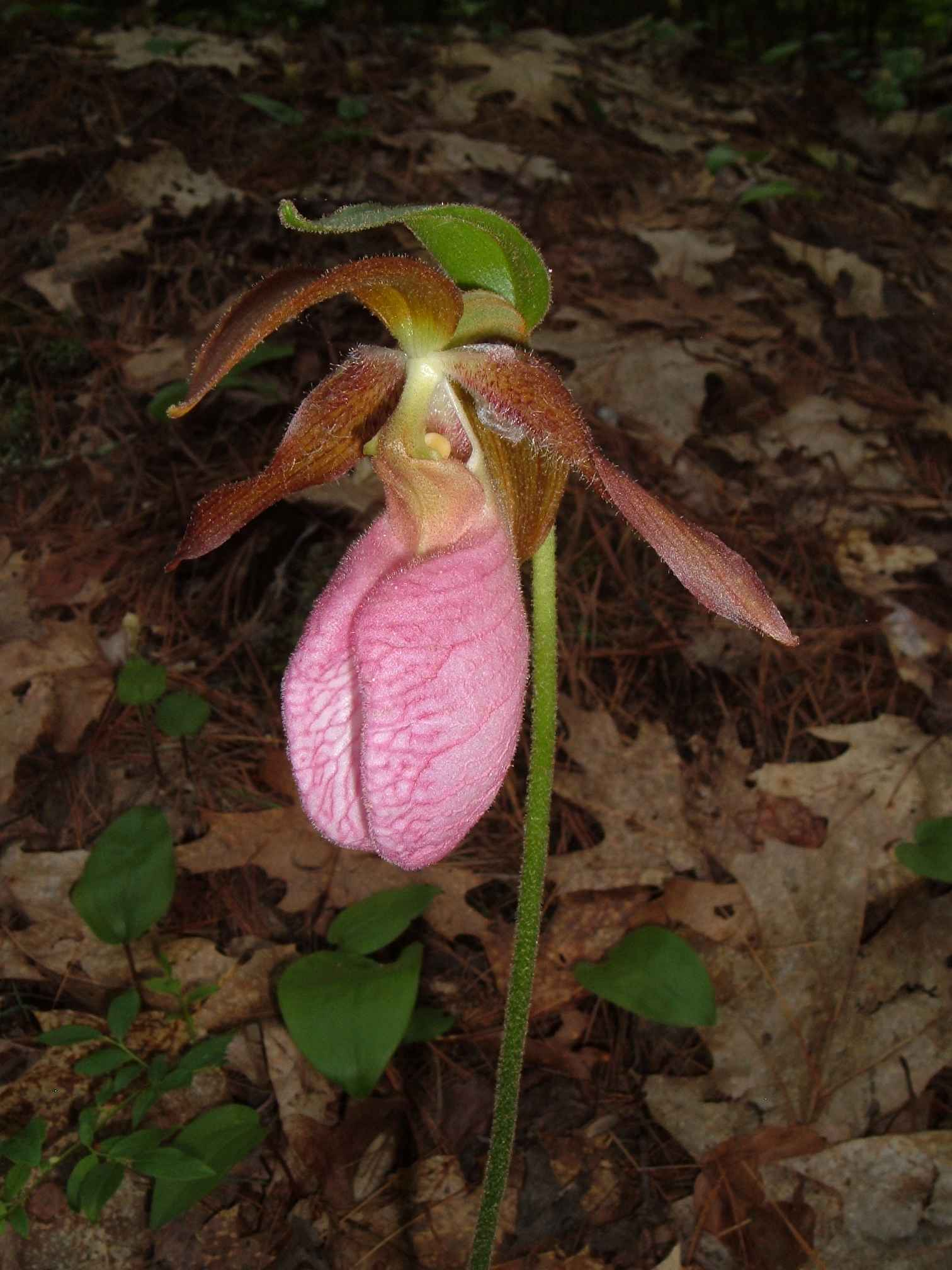
Pink ladies slipper orchid in the Bruce Peninsula

Some of the rarest flowers and ferns in Ontario can be found growing on the Bruce Peninsula. For example: lakeside daisy (Tetraneuris herbacea var. glabra), dwarf lake iris (Iris lacustris), and northern holly fern (Polystichum lonchitis)

=== Orchids ===
Globally, there are more than 30,000 orchid species. Canada is home to 77 of these species. Ontario has 61 varieties of orchids, and of these, 44 can be found in the Bruce Peninsula.

A selection of interesting orchids on the Bruce Peninsula:

- yellow lady's slipper — Cypripedium parviflorum
- pink lady's slipper — Cypripedium acaule
- nodding ladies' tresses — Spiranthes cernua
- eastern prairie fringed orchid — Platanthera leucophaea
- ram's-head lady's-slipper — Cypripedium arietinum
- European common twayblade — Neottia ovata
- helleborine — Epipactis helleborine

== Communities ==
The Bruce Peninsula is composed of the Municipalities of Northern Bruce Peninsula and South Bruce Peninsula.

The main villages in these regions are as follows:

- Tobermory is located at the northern end of the Bruce Peninsula. It has a landing for the passenger-car ferry MS Chi-Cheemaun. Nearby is Bruce Peninsula National Park and Fathom Five National Marine Park. This port village has galleries, tourist shops and a historic lighthouse.
- Lion's Head is located in the centre of the Bruce Peninsula on Georgian Bay. The village has a public marina and sandy beach.
- Wiarton, near the south end of the peninsula, is the home of Wiarton Willie.
- Sauble Beach is more than seven miles (11 km) long.
- Greater Saugeen Shores (Southampton and Port Elgin), a beautiful region known of its stunning waterways and impeccable charm.
