= Neyaashiinigmiing 27 =

Neyaashiinigmiing
- Unceded territory
- Neyaashiinigmiing Indian Reserve No. 27
- Location within Southern Ontario
- Coordinates: 44°55′N 81°02′W
- Country: Canada
- Province: Ontario
- County: Bruce
- First Nation: Chippewas of Nawash

Area
  - Land: 63.76 km^{2} (24.62 sq mi)

Population (2021)
  - Total: 580
  - Density: 9.1/km^{2} (24/sq mi)
- Website: www.nawash.ca

Neyaashiinigmiing, formerly Cape Croker, is a reserve within Bruce County, Ontario. It is one of the parcels of land administered by the Chippewas of Nawash Unceded First Nation.

== Etymology ==
The name Neyaashiinigmiing is loosely translated from Ojibwe as "point of land surrounded on three sides by water", which describes the location of Neyaashiinigmiing 27.

== Points of interest ==
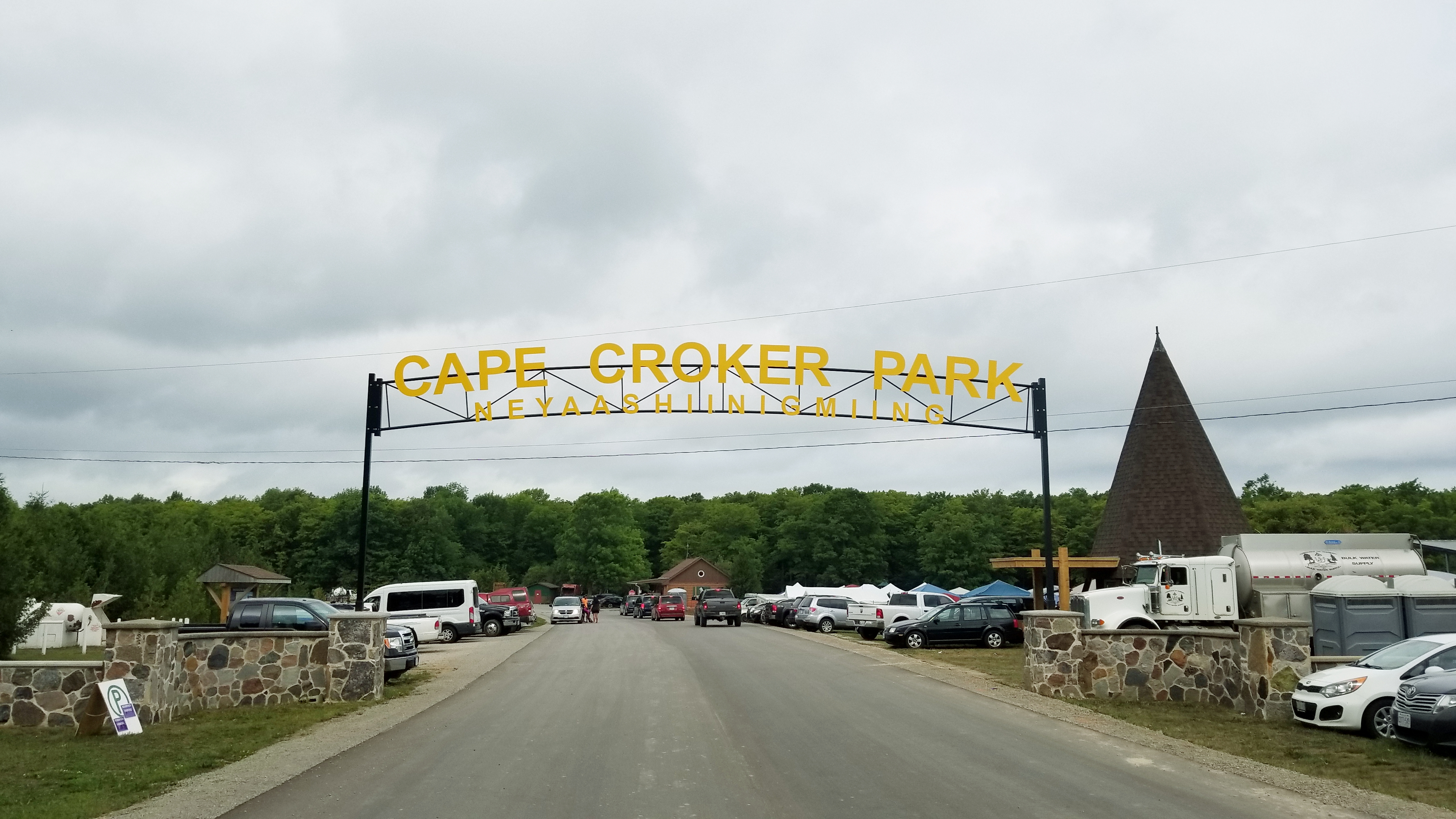
Cape Croker Park sign

=== Cape Croker Lighthouse ===
The Cape Croker Lighthouse is located on the south-east corner of Neyaashiinigmiing. It was first built in 1898, but was replaced in 1902 with the current lighthouse. The lighthouse was the first of its type and was the first to have an electrically ran light and foghorn. The lighthouse is an octagonal lighthouse, with a height of 18 meters/53 feet. The original lighthouse was a wooden lighthouse. The lighthouse has a fresnel light and its range is 24 km.

=== Cape Croker Park ===
Cape Croker Park is a 520-acre park located in Neyaashiinigmiing. Surrounding Sydney Bay. It offers camping and hosts the Neyaashiinigmiing Annual Traditional POWWOW.

=== Bruce Trail ===
The Bruce Trail goes through Neyaashiinigmiing and on some of the bluffs on Neyaashiinigmiing.

=== Others ===
The reserve Neyaashiinigmiing is also home to two bluffs the Jones Bluff and the Sydney Bay Bluff, the Bruce trail goes on both of the bluffs.

== Demographics ==
Canada census – Neyaashiinigmiing 27 community profile

	2021	2016	2011
Population	580 (-5.7% from 2016)	615 (-7.8% from 2011)	667 (12.9% from 2006)
Land area	63.76 km^{2} (24.62 sq mi)	63.84 km^{2} (24.65 sq mi)	63.81 km^{2} (24.64 sq mi)
Population density	9.1/km^{2} (24/sq mi)	9.6/km^{2} (25/sq mi)	12.5/km^{2} (32/sq mi)
Median age	44 (M: 40.8, F: 50)	37.7 (M: 36.2, F: 39.0)	n/a (M: n/a, F: n/a)
Private dwellings	250 (total)	410 (total)	351 (total)
Median household income		$29,568

References: 2021 2016 2011
