= List of numbered roads in Bruce County =

List of county roads

Interactive map of Bruce County (outline in black), showing numbered roads within the county
'"`UNIQ--templatestyles-00000000-QINU`"'
King's Highways
'"`UNIQ--templatestyles-00000001-QINU`"'
Bruce county roads

The numbered roads in Bruce County account for approximately 660 kilometres (410.1 mi) of roads in the Canadian province of Ontario. (Note: The total length only counts concurrent sections of roadways once.) These roads (Note: In Ontario, all roads are legally known as highways. However, road is the more prevalent term for common use. The Ontario Municipal Act defines a highway as any road, street or bridge that is not a Provincial Highway.) include King's Highways that are signed and maintained by the province, as well as county roads under the jurisdiction of the Bruce County Transportation and Environmental Services Department. The third type of existing roadway in the county is locally maintained municipal roads, many of which are concession roads and sidelines; these are beyond the scope of this article.

The 29 numbered routes provide year-round access to the mostly rural municipality. The longest of these roads is Highway 6, which stretches 87.9 kilometres (54.6 mi) across the Bruce Peninsula—a long and narrow strip of land separating Lake Huron from Georgian Bay—between Hepworth and Tobermory. The shortest numbered road is Bruce Road 25, which travels 1.6 kilometres (0.99 mi) from Highway 21 to the Lake Huron shoreline.

== Types of roads ==
=== King's Highways ===
There are 226.0 kilometres (140.4 mi) of provincially-maintained highways, termed "provincial highways" or "King's Highways" (a term adopted in 1930). As in the rest of Ontario, the provincially maintained highways in Bruce are designated with a shield-shaped sign topped with a crown. The highway number is in the centre, with the word ONTARIO below. These signs are known as shields, but may be referred to as reassurance markers. Provincially maintained highways generally have greater construction standards than municipally or locally maintained roads. Although they are usually one lane in either direction, several short sections with two lanes in one direction as a passing lane exist along the highways.

=== County roads ===
There are 27 numbered county roads in Bruce County. County roads are signed with a flowerpot-shaped sign, as are most regional and county roads in Ontario. The road number appears in the centre of the sign, with the word BRUCE above and the word COUNTY below. Like King's Highways, these signs are known as shields. The total length of Bruce County roads is 657.8 kilometres (408.7 mi), including concurrencies.

== Roads ==
=== King's Highways ===
King's Highways
Route	Western/Southern Terminus	Eastern/Northern Terminus	Length		Communities	Comments
Route	Western/Southern Terminus	Eastern/Northern Terminus	km	mi	Communities	Comments
Highway 6	County Road 8 / County Road 10 (Queen Street/Bruce Street)	Big Tub Road / Front Street in Tobermory	87.9	54.6	Hepworth, Wiarton, Tobermory	
Highway 9	Highway 21 in Kincardine	Huron–Bruce Road near Clifford	57.4	35.7	Kincardine, Walkerton, Mildmay	
Highway 21	County Road 86 at Amberley	County Road 10 north (Grey–Bruce Line) at Alvanley	81.1	50.4	Kincardine, Tiverton, Port Elgin, Southampton	

=== County roads ===
County roads are referred to on signage as Bruce Road X. The following table lists existing numbered roads maintained by the County of Bruce. The county also maintains Grey–Bruce Line between Scone and Highway 21 as an unnumbered county road.

Bruce County Roads
Route	Name(s)	Western/Southern Terminus	Eastern/Northern Terminus	Length		Communities	Comments
Route	Name(s)	Western/Southern Terminus	Eastern/Northern Terminus	km	mi	Communities	Comments
Bruce County Road 1	Bruce Road 1 Ross Street, Staufer Street (Lucknow); Mill Drive (Paisley)	700 m (0.43 mi) south of County Road 86 (Campbell Street)	County Road 3 (Queen Street)	47.4	29.5	Lucknow, Paisley	
Bruce County Road 2	Durham Street	County Road 3	County Road 4	4.4	2.7	Walkerton	Short spur road, connecting Bruce Road 4 just north of Walkerton, to Bruce Road 3.
Bruce County Road 3	Bruce Road 3 Queen Street (Paisley)	Highway 9 in Mildmay	Highway 21 between Southampton and Port Elgin	54.4	33.8	Mildmay, Paisley	
Bruce County Road 4	London Road; Clinton Street (Teeswater); Young Street, Jackson Street, Durham Street (Walkerton); 10th Street (Hanover)	Huron–Bruce Road (boundary with Huron County)	Saugeen River in Hanover (boundary with Grey County)	41.1	25.5	Teeswater, Walkerton, Hanover	Former Highway 4. Along its concurrency with Highway 9, maps show the road as Highway 9/County Road 4.
Bruce County Road 5	Brook Street East	County Road 10 in Tara	Grey–Bruce Road (continues as Grey County Road 5)	2.7	1.7	Tara	
Bruce County Road 6	Bruce Road 6/6E; Hillcrest Street (Teeswater); Absalom Street (Mildmay)	Highway 21	County Road 10 south of Neustadt	59.8	37.2	Ripley, Teeswater, Mildmay	Bruce Road 6 ends at intersection with Bruce Road 12. Bruce Road 6 East continues until Bruce Road 10
Bruce County Road 7	Bruce Road 7	County Road 86 (former Highway 86), the Bruce County - Huron County Townline	Highway 9	16.9	10.5	Ripley	
Bruce County Road 8	Main Street, Tolmie Road, Queen Street	County Road 13 in Sauble Beach	County Road 10 in Hepworth	10.4	6.5	Sauble Beach, Tolmie, Hepworth	
Bruce County Road 9	Burma Road, Ferndale Road, Evergreen Road	Highway 6, 3 km (1.9 mi) north of Wiarton	2 kilometres (1.2 mi) east of Parker Landing, at the interserction of Stokes Bay Road/West Road	36.5	22.7	Ferndale	
Bruce County Road 10	Bruce Road 10, Bruce Street, Yonge Street, 1st Avenue, 4th Street	Grey–Bruce Line (boundary with Grey County) at Scone	Highway 6 in Hepworth	78.9	49.0	Hepworth, Tara, Chesley, Hanover, Neustadt	Section from Hepworth to Highway 21 was former route of Highway 6 before it was rerouted along Highway 70, when the latter was decommissioned in 1998. The route of Highway 6 prior to 1998 became an extension of Bruce Road 10
Bruce County Road 11	Bruce Road 11	Highway 21 in North Bruce	County Road 10 north of Chesley	14.4	8.9	Paisley	
Bruce County Road 12	Bruce Road 12	Huron–Bruce Road (boundary with Huron County) at Belmore	Highway 9/Bruce Road 4 west of Walkerton.	16.6	10.3	Formosa	
Bruce County Road 13	Turner Street, Bruce Road, Southampton Parkway, Sauble Falls Parkway, Oliphant Road, Jenny Street	Highway 21 in Southampton	Highway 6 in Wiarton	38.7	24.0	Southampton, Sauble Beach, Sauble Falls, Wiarton	
Bruce County Road 14	Bruce Road 14	Highway 21	County Road 8 in Tolmie	11.3	7.0	Tolmie	
Bruce County Road 15	Bruce Road 15	Lake Street in Inverhuron	County Road 3 in Eden Grove	32.2	20.0	Inverhuron, Tiverton	Close to Inverhuron Provincial Park and the Bruce Nuclear Plant
Bruce County Road 17	Gustavus Street, Union Street	Highway 21 in Port Elgin	County Road 10 south of Tara	22.5	14.0	Port Elgin, Tara	
Bruce County Road 19	Sideroad 15	County Road 4 east of Walkerton	County Road 10	23.3	14.5	Walkerton, Vesta	
Bruce County Road 20	Bruce Road 20, Concession 4	Highway 9/Bruce Road 4	County Road 33 (Tie Road) at Bruce Nuclear Generating Station	35.6	22.1	Portal	
Bruce County Road 22	Bruce Road 22	County Road 4 just west of Hanover	County Road 10 north of Hanover	3.2	2.0	Hanover	North-West portion of Hanover by-pass
Bruce County Road 23	Bruce Road 23, E/F Sideroad	Parker Street in Kincardine	County Road 20	16.5	10.3	Kincardine	
Bruce County Road 25	C.A.W. Road	Saugeen Beach Road (Lake Huron shoreline)	Highway 21, Saugeen Township Concession 6	1.6	0.99	Port Elgin	
Bruce County Road 26	Frank Street	Highway 6 / Berford Street in Wiarton	Grey Road 1	1.64	1.02	Wiarton	
Bruce County Road 28	Bruce Road 28, McIntosh Line, Absalom Street	Huron–Bruce Road in McIntosh	Highway 9 in Mildmay	8.6	5.3	Mildmay	
Bruce County Road 29	Main Street	County Road 9	Everatt Sideroad	2.0	1.2	Lion's Head	
Bruce County Road 30	1st Avenue	County Road 10 in Chesley	County Road 19	2.0	1.2	Chesley	
Bruce County Road 33	Bruce Road 33, Tie Road, B & C Side Road, Bruce-Saugeen Townline, Lake Range Road	County Road 20	County Road 25	19.2	11.9		
Bruce County Road 40	Bruce Road 40	Highway 21	Grey–Bruce Line (continues south as Grey County Road 40)	27.0	16.8	Williscroft	
Bruce County Road 86	Amberley Road, Campbell Street	Highway 21 in Amberley	Bruce/Huron County Boundary, continues as Huron County Road 86	30.6	19.0	Lucknow	
