= Little Mud Lake =

Lake in Bruce County, Ontario, Canada

- petit lac Mud
- Location in southern Ontario
- Location: Bruce County, Ontario
- Coordinates: 44°47′16″N 81°09′46″W
- Part of: Great Lakes Basin
- Primary inflows: unnamed creek
- Primary outflows: unnamed creek
- Basin countries: Canada
- Max. length: 200 m (660 ft)
- Max. width: 120 m (390 ft)
- Surface elevation: 211 m (692 ft)

Little Mud Lake (French: petit lac Mud) is a lake in South Bruce Peninsula, Bruce County in southwestern Ontario, Canada. It is part of the Great Lakes Basin, and is about 5.5 kilometres (3.4 mi) northwest of the community of Wiarton.

The lake has one unnamed inflow at the northwest. The primary outflow is an unnamed creek at the southeast which flows to Big Mud Lake and then to Berford Lake, the source of the Rankin River, which in turn flows via the Sauble River to Lake Huron.

== See also ==
- List of lakes in Ontario
