= Big Mud Lake =

Lake in Bruce County, Ontario, Canada

Bid Mud Lake
- grand lac Mud
- Location in southern Ontario
- Location: Bruce County, Ontario
- Coordinates: 44°47′44″N 81°09′53″W
- Part of: Great Lakes Basin
- Primary inflows: unnamed creek
- Primary outflows: unnamed creek
- Basin countries: Canada
- Max. length: 1,200 m (3,900 ft)
- Max. width: 500 m (1,600 ft)
- Surface elevation: 209 m (686 ft)

Bid Mud Lake (French: grand lac Mud) is a lake in South Bruce Peninsula, Bruce County in southwestern Ontario, Canada. It is part of the Great Lakes Basin, and is about 6 kilometres (3.7 mi) northwest of the community of Wiarton.

The lake has one unnamed inflow at the east, arriving from Little Mud Lake. The primary outflow is an unnamed creek at the northwest which flows to Berford Lake, the source of the Rankin River, which in turn flows via the Sauble River to Lake Huron.

== See also ==
- List of lakes in Ontario
