= Saugeen =

Saugeen may refer to the following in Ontario, Canada:

- Chippewas of Saugeen Ojibway Territory, the name applied to Chippewas of Nawash Unceded First Nation and Saugeen First Nation as a collective
- Ojibway Nation of Saugeen First Nation, Ojibwa First Nation
- Saugeen First Nation, Ojibway First Nation located along the Saugeen River and Bruce Peninsula
- Saugeen Kame Terraces, 431 hectare provincially significant Earth Science Area of Natural and Scientific Interest
- Saugeen River, tributary of Lake Huron
- Saugeen Shores, town in Bruce County
- Saugeen Shores Winterhawks, senior hockey team based out of Saugeen Shores
- Saugeen Tract Agreement, signed August 9, 1836 between the Saugeen Ojibwa and Ottawa and the government of Upper Canada
- Saugeen–Maitland Hall, co-ed students' residence at the University of Western Ontario in London
