= 2014 Grey County municipal elections =

Local election in Ontario, Canada

Elections were held in Grey County, Ontario on October 27, 2014 in conjunction with municipal elections across the province.

== Grey County Council ==
The Grey County Council consists of the mayors and deputy mayors of each of the constituent communities.

Position	Elected
Chatsworth Mayor	Bob Pringle
Chatsworth Deputy Mayor	Scott Mackey
Georgian Bluffs Mayor	Alan Barfoot (acclaimed)
Georgian Bluffs Deputy Mayor	Dwight Burley
Grey Highlands Mayor	Paul McQueen
Grey Highlands Deputy Mayor	Stewart Halliday
Hanover Mayor	Sue Paterson
Hanover Deputy Mayor	Selwyn J. Hicks
Meaford Mayor	Barb Clumpus
Meaford Deputy Mayor	Harley Greenfield
Owen Sound Mayor	Ian Boddy
Owen Sound Deputy Mayor	Arlene Wright
Southgate Mayor	Anna-Marie Fosbrooke
Southgate Deputy Mayor	Norman Jack
The Blue Mountains Mayor	John F. McKean
The Blue Mountains Deputy Mayor	Gail Ardiel
West Grey Mayor	Kevin Eccles
West Grey Deputy Mayor	John A. Bell

== The Blue Mountains ==
Mayoral Candidate	Vote	%
John F. McKean	2,351	59.41
Duncan McKinlay	1,606	40.59

== Chatsworth ==
Mayoral Candidate	Vote	%
Bob Pringle (X)	1,968	70.92
Ron Smith	807	29.08

== Georgian Bluffs ==
Mayoral Candidate	Vote	%
Alan Barfoot (X)	Acclaimed	

== Grey Highlands ==
Mayoral Candidate	Vote	%
Paul McQueen	2,241	55.73
Paul Allen	1,780	44.27

== Hanover ==
Mayoral Candidate	Vote	%
Sue Paterson	1,441	47.29
David C. Hocking	970	31.83
Andrew J. McBride	636	20.87

== Meaford ==
Mayoral Candidate	Vote	%
Barb Clumpus	1,885	38.56
Jim McPherson	1,529	31.28
Ray McHugh	1,069	21.87
Deborah Young	364	7.45
Noreen Hunter Riley	41	0.84

== Owen Sound ==
Mayoral Candidate	Vote	%
Ian Boddy	3,937	47.37
Ruth Lovell Stanners	2,817	33.89
Deborah Haswell (X)	1,120	13.48
Mike Zimon	437	5.26

== Southgate ==
Mayoral Candidate	Vote	%
Anna-Marie Fosbrooke	861	45.92
Brian Milne (X)	812	43.31
Mike Scarr	202	10.77

== West Grey ==
Mayoral Candidate	Vote	%
Kevin Eccles (X)	1,900	59.15
Christine Robinson	1,312	40.85
