= Detour =

Diversion on a route

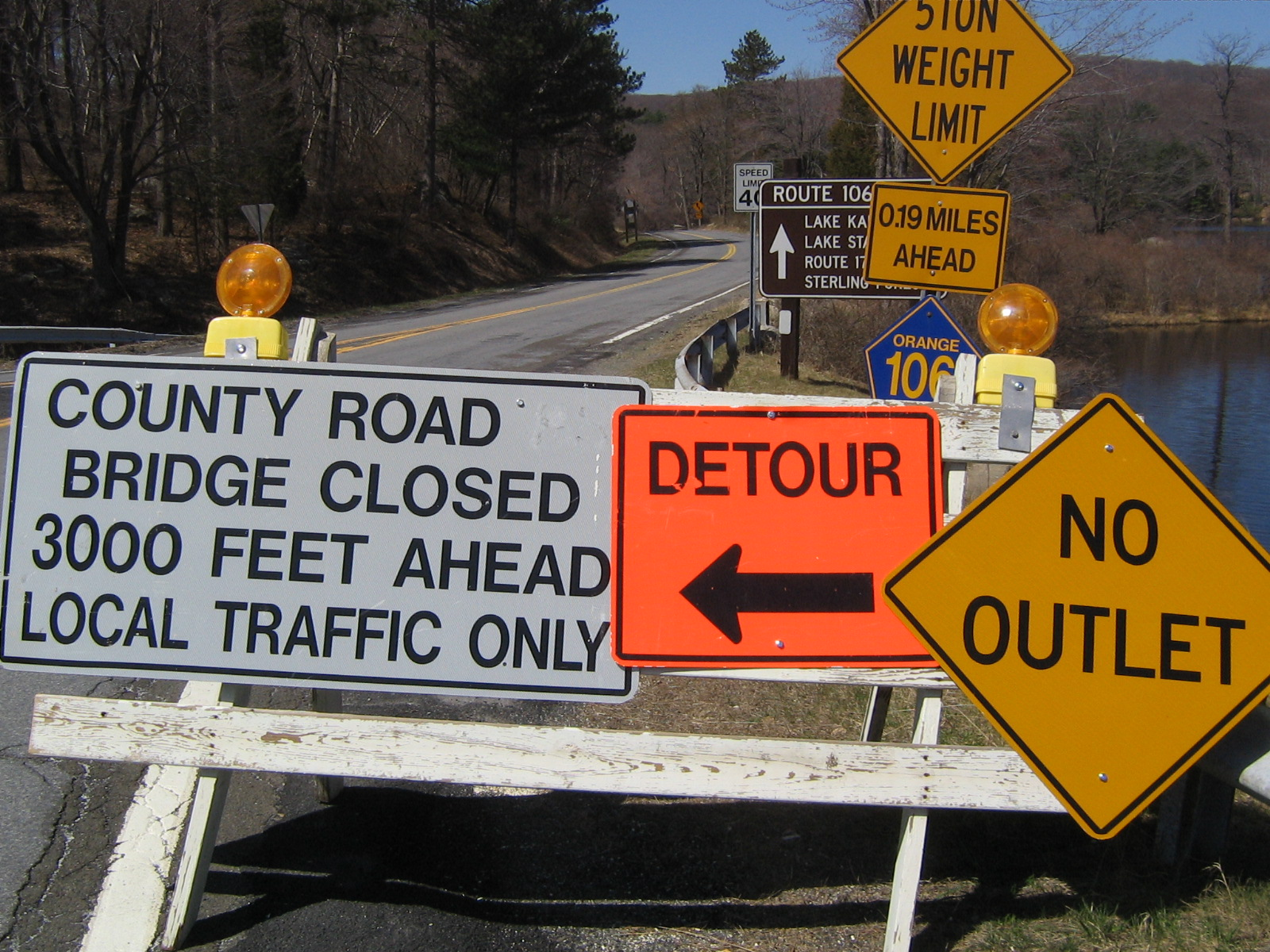
A partial detour in the United States, with the road restricted to local traffic only.

A detour or (British English: diversion) is a (normally temporary) route taking traffic around an area of prohibited or reduced access, such as a construction site. Standard operating procedure for many roads departments is to route any detour over roads within the same jurisdiction as the road with the obstructed area.

On multi-lane highways (e.g., freeways, expressways, city streets, etc.), usually traffic shifts can replace a detour, as detours often congest turn lanes.

== Types ==
Detour sign used in Singapore

Detour sign used in Italy

Depending on the roadway affected, and the scope of construction, different types of detours may be used. The most basic is to simply close a stretch of roadway for a defined period of time, diverting all traffic around the site. Other types of detours may also be used, such as a detour that is only in effect at night, only in effect during weekends, or a detour that restricts through traffic while permitting local traffic such as residents and delivery vehicles. Which type of detour to use is decided by a variety of factors – a full closure of a road means construction can be completed more quickly, but also means a more severe impact on traffic.

== Implementation ==
Detours require signage to notify drivers, especially those who are not local and are unfamiliar with the road network in an area. Creating a detour imposes costs on motorists, along with wear and tear on the detour route. When a detour from a highway travels over local streets, they may first be reinforced to handle highway level traffic.

== Railroad detours ==
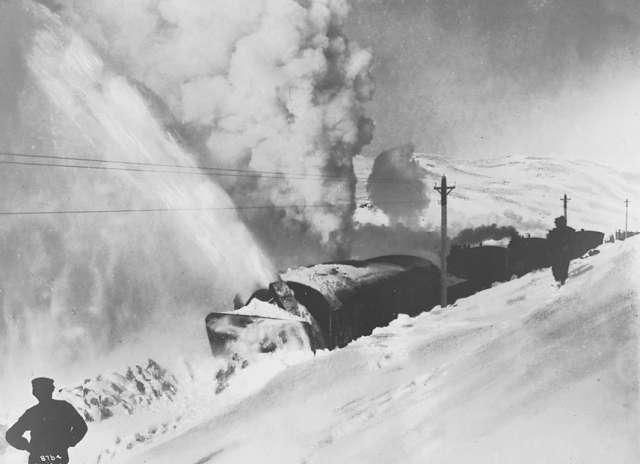
Extreme weather events such as heavy snow require temporary detours to be used until roads and railroads can be cleared and reopened.

Detours may be used for trains as well. Implementing detours is more difficult for railroads, as rail networks do not have the many redundant pathways offered by road networks. Railroad detours are most commonly used when a significant natural disaster renders a railroad route inaccessible until it can be repaired, though they may also be used when a line is out of service for maintenance.

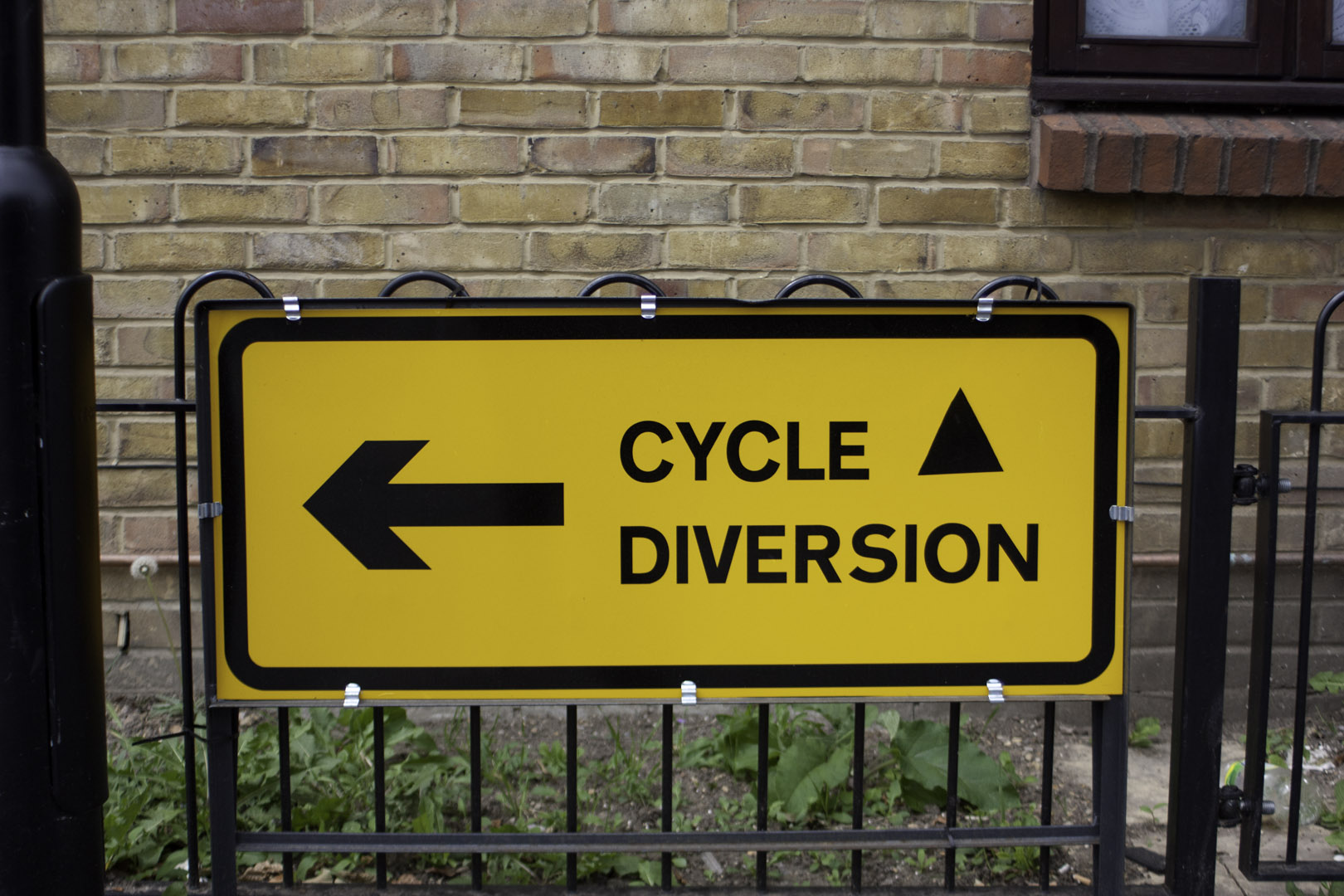
Diverted cycle route in the UK

In North America, the various railroad companies have agreed to cooperate when one company needs to detour its trains onto the tracks of a different company. The railroad detouring trains will arrange with the "host" railroad(s) how many trains a day will need to use a detour, and agree on the fee per train-mile the detouring company will pay in exchange.

Detour sign used in the United States

== Permanently signed detour routes ==
A permanently signed detour route (also known as an emergency detour route or emergency diversion route) is a type of route which is used temporarily during special circumstances. Various areas have developed these systems as part of incident management. The purpose of these routes is to provide a detour in the event that the parent route is impassable, due to either a traffic jams, traffic collision, or road closure (for a variety of reasons). Sometimes these routes are signed as a prefixed or suffixed numbered road, making them a type of special route.
