= Berkeley, Ontario =

Berkeley
- Location of Berkeley in Ontario.
- Coordinates: 44°21′59″N 80°43′40″W
- Country: Canada
- Province: Ontario
- County: Grey
- Elevation: 410 m (1,350 ft)
- Time zone: UTC-5 (Eastern Time Zone)
  - Summer (DST): UTC-4 (Eastern Time Zone)
- Area codes: 519, 226

Berkeley is a community on Ontario Highway 10 in the township of Chatsworth, Grey County, Ontario, Canada.

The Berkeley Post Office was opened in 1853. There were three churches in Berkeley: a Presbyterian church, an Anglican church and a United Church. Only the United Church is still standing, although closed at present due to high maintenance expenses.
