= Chatsworth, Ontario (former village) =

Chatsworth
- Unincorporated village
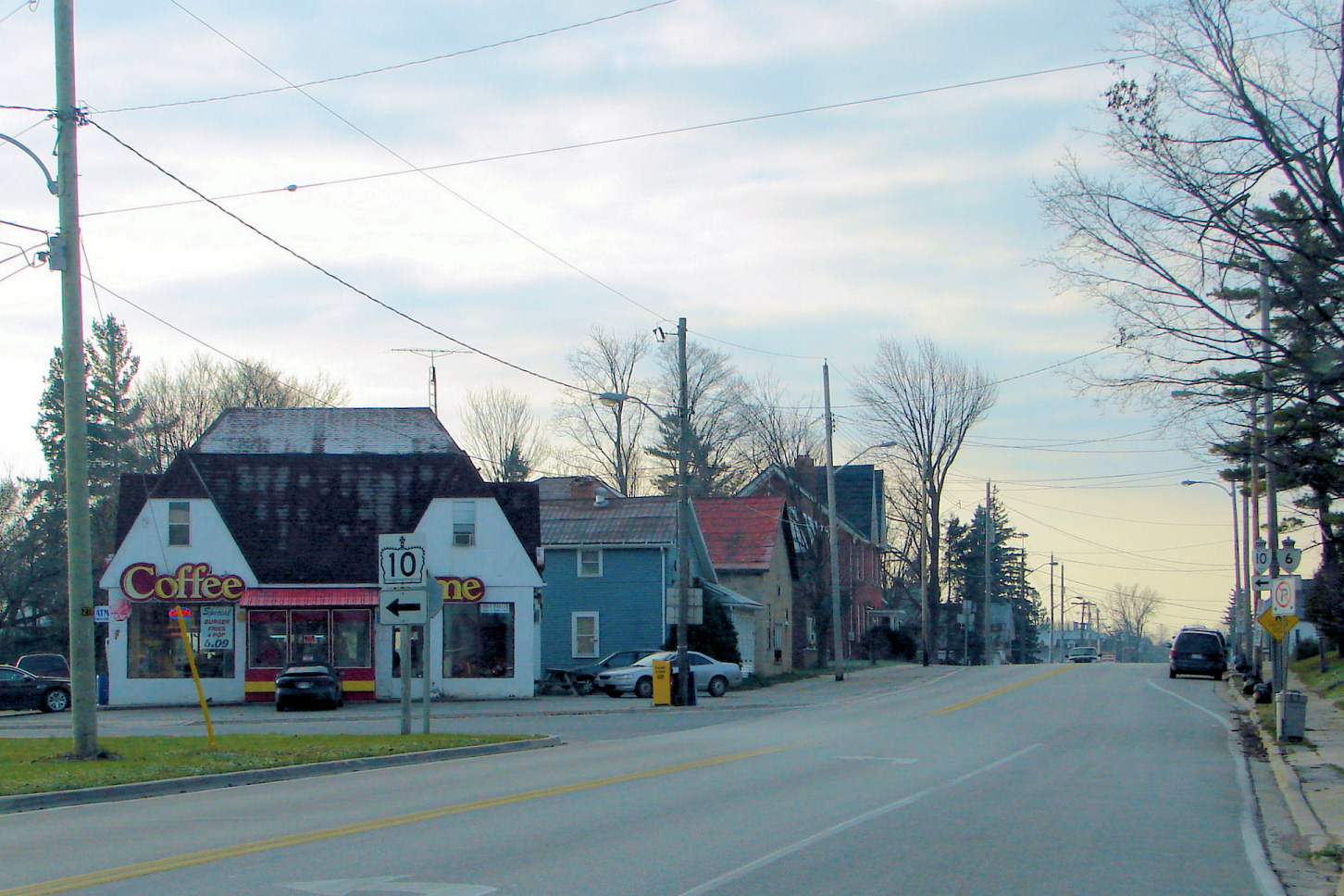
- Interactive map of Chatsworth
- Coordinates: 44°27′13″N 80°53′45″W
- Country: Canada
- province: Ontario
- County: Grey
- Township: Chatsworth
- Elevation: 296 m (971 ft)

Population (2016)
  - Total: 535
- Time zone: UTC−5 (EST)
  - Summer (DST): UTC−4 (EDT)
- Postal code: N0H 1G0
- Area codes: 519 and 226

Chatsworth is a community in Grey County, Ontario, Canada, part of the Township of Chatsworth. It is located south of Owen Sound and north of Durham where Highways 6 and 10 merge. The village neighbours Williamsford, Dornoch, and Desboro.

== History ==
Originally named Johnstown after an early landowner, the post office was renamed Holland East in 1851. It was renamed again to its present name in 1857. The name comes from Chatsworth House, in Derbyshire, near the home town of the postmaster at that time.

Chatsworth was founded in 1848 at the northern terminus of the Toronto-Sydenham Colonization Road. Modern Highway 10 follows most of the original road's route. On January 1, 2001, The Village of Chatsworth was merged into the new Township of Chatsworth, along with Holland and Sullivan Townships.

Famous Canadian suffragette Nellie McClung was born in Chatsworth.

== Demographics ==
In the 2021 Census of Population conducted by Statistics Canada, Chatsworth had a population of 560 living in 249 of its 255 total private dwellings, a change of 4.7% from its 2016 population of 535. With a land area of 0.76 km^{2} (0.29 sq mi), it had a population density of 736.8/km^{2} (1,908.4/sq mi) in 2021.

== Transportation ==
Chatsworth sits at the junction of Ontario Highway 6 and Ontario Highway 10, which are the modern-day evolutions of the Garafraxa Colonization Road and the Toronto-Sydenham Colonization Road respectively. The Toronto, Grey and Bruce Railway once passed through the village, but that section of its line (then owned by Canadian Pacific) was abandoned in the 1980s.
