= Permanently signed detour route =

Road classification and signage

A permanently signed detour route (also known as an emergency detour route or emergency diversion route) is a type of route which is used temporarily during special circumstances. Various areas have developed these systems as part of incident management. The purpose of these routes is to provide a detour in the event that the parent route is impassable, due to either a traffic jams, traffic collision, or road closure (for a variety of reasons). Sometimes these routes are signed as a prefixed or suffixed numbered road, making them a type of special route.

A permanently signed detour route should not be confused with a "permanent detour". The latter would be used if a particular roadway section, such as a bridge, were closed permanently. (Note: For example, "The Pinkerton Tunnel, near Markleton, remains closed with a detour on abandoned rail line following the river. This is a permanent detour, there are no plans to reconstruct this tunnel.")

== Australia ==
=== New South Wales ===
Detour route marker used in New South Wales

The state of New South Wales in Australia has signposted detour routes, generally marked with the singular letter "D", on various motorways.

On the M1 Pacific Motorway between Newcastle and Sydney, both "D" and "D1" are used, to reduce ambiguity when two detour route sections meet each other.

The M5 East motorway has a permanently signed "D5" alternate route, used in the case of temporary road closures, and also by vehicles unsuitable for its tunnel. Unusually for detour routes, the D5 route is integrated into regular directional signage.

=== Queensland ===
In Queensland, diversion routes are normally signed on a gold on dark blue marker, often abbreviated to "DR". Where many diversion routes exist on/in a given road or area, they can be optionally numbered using the "DR" prefix.

=== South Australia ===
The South Eastern Freeway in the Adelaide Hills region uses a set of permanently signed emergency detour routes, sequentially numbered D1 to D4.

== Canada ==
=== Ontario ===
An emergency detour route (EDR) sign on Ontario Highway 401

The province of Ontario in Canada is one jurisdiction outside the United States with a very prevalent system of these roads. The Emergency Detour Routes, originally Emergency Diversion Routes (EDR), are a system of temporary detour routes paralleling many major highways in Ontario. Most of these follow county or municipal roads within the province that are not (currently) provincially controlled (though many were former provincial highways). These routes are designed to be used in the event of a closure on a major road or 400-series highway, such as construction or serious collisions.

Though most EDRs are set up along 400-series highways, a select few have been established along two lane King's Highways, notably Highway 21 due to the lake effect of Lake Huron, which can result in sudden snowsquall conditions during the winter.

History

Halton was the first jurisdiction in Ontario to create EDRs, although it initially referred to them as Emergency Diversion Routes. In August 1999, the regional council approved the preparation of the Road Closure Action Plan (RCAP), which was developed with input from the Halton Regional Police Services and the Ministry of Transportation of Ontario (MTO). The RCAP utilized folding signs that police could open to "activate" the route. Similar in appearance to the EDR signs of today, the RCAP signs featured a trapezoid shaped orange EDR sign, as opposed to an orange square with a black circle containing the letters EDR. These signs were first deployed along a limited stretch of the Queen Elizabeth Way in March 2001, between Dorval Drive and Trafalgar Road in Oakville and between Bronte Road and Burloak Drive in Burlington, both the location of major ravines with limited alternative crossings.

By the spring of 2003, when the deployment of the system was complete, the entire Queen Elizabeth Way, Highway 401 and Highway 403 had diversion routes within Halton Region. Following Halton's tests, the MTO and the Ontario Good Roads Association formed a joint task force, and using the RCAP as a model, developed the Emergency Detour Route program.

In 2010 and 2011, an aggressive program was instituted to place EDRs alongside major routes throughout the province.

=== Alberta ===
Highway 2 uses Highway 2A as an Emergency Detour Route. On Highway 2, there are signs with flashing lights indicating when to take the next exit to use the detour route.

== Germany ==
Autobahn "on-demand" detour sign

Sign showing continuation of detour over next sequential detour route

Every exit on the German Autobahn and some other expressways has a pre-posted "on-demand" detour route (German: Bedarfsumleitung) marked with a blue and white sign having a number starting with a "U" (short for "Umleitung", German for "detour".) In the event an Autobahn segment must be closed due to a crash, road work, or other incident, drivers can be diverted off the Autobahn to follow the numbered signs over the adjacent secondary road network to the next downstream Autobahn entrance. In the event that entrance is also closed, signs will indicate to motorists to follow the next sequentially-numbered route. Odd-numbered detour routes are used for northbound and eastbound travel, while even-numbered routes are used for southbound and westbound travel. The detours can also optionally be used to circumnavigate traffic jams.

As the detours use secondary roadways, federal administrative rules require consultation with local authorities when planning the detour routes, and routes are selected to minimize distance, stops (i.e. traffic signals), and disruption to nearby communities as much as possible.

== Ireland ==
Emergency diversion route symbols

Following the identification of emergency diversion routes on the M50 in 2016, a set of symbols to indicate such routes was introduced. The operation of these routes as well as the symbols used are similar to that in the UK, although hollow shape symbols are not used. They are typically displayed on directional signs, or are displayed on their own signs with an arrow indicating the direction of the route. In the event of a road closure, a variable message sign will display a message indicating the symbol to be followed, allowing drivers to bypass the closure.

== Sweden ==
Road number sign for traffic diversion

For comparison, a road number sign for the main route

Sweden use signs with white background and blue text for their permanent detour routes (Swedish: permanent omledningsväg) on numbered roads. According to the Swedish Transport Administration's guidelines a permanent detour route should be able to handle all the traffic when it comes to capacity, weight, height, etc. as sorting traffic is almost impossible. In cases that for some reason need traffic sorting the police will regulate the traffic. However, there may be different routes for different travel directions as to not create accessibility problems or queues due to limited capacity; in these cases a letter for the cardinal direction is added at the end. The guidelines also emphasize that the segments of the permanent detour route should be as short as possible with access to the main route whenever it is possible.

== United Kingdom ==
An emergency diversion route symbol, a solid square

An emergency diversion route symbol, a hollow square

A trigger sign, used to indicate which symbol to follow when a route is closed

The United Kingdom use yellow signs with a series of symbols for their emergency diversion routes. Symbols come in a shapes, with a solid and hollow version, including circle, triangle, square and diamond. When a roadway is closed, a trigger sign is opened at the last junction prior to the closure, displaying a symbol, which motorists can follow to rejoin the route at a point beyond the closure.

== United States ==
The federal Manual on Uniform Traffic Control Devices introduced signage for these routes in its eleventh edition in December 2023.

=== Michigan ===
Emergency plate

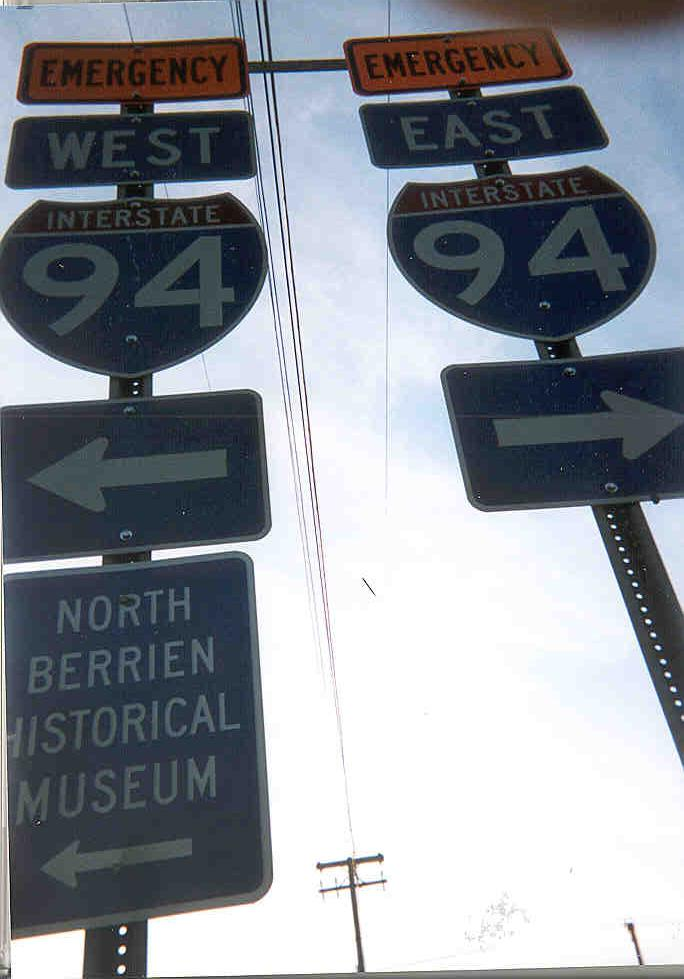
Emergency I-94 shields in Coloma, Michigan

Michigan has a system of special routes called "Emergency" routes which parallel major highways, primarily in Southwestern Michigan. These routes provide relief in the event of emergency closures to a freeway due to accidents, weather, or other civil emergencies. Emergency routes have been gradually put in place as part of a broader plan by the Michigan Department of Transportation (MDOT) to upgrade its ITS network across the state. These detours may or may not follow MDOT-maintained State Highways, however, and some portions of the routes pass through urban or suburban areas. Emergency routes exist on and parallel to Interstate 69 (I-69) and I-94 and US Highway 31 (US 31).

These routes are signed with an auxiliary "Emergency" plate that is colored orange, indicating a temporary traffic control sign.

Emergency US 31, which offers an alternative crossing of the Grand River in the event that the bascule bridge in Grand Haven, Michigan is unavailable for motorists, is one such route. According to MDOT, "this route would only be used in emergency situations and worst-case scenarios impacting the entire bridge structure."

=== Missouri ===
Missouri uses "Incident By-Pass Routes" along its highways.

=== Nebraska ===
Nebraska has created an alternate route for Interstate 80.

=== New York ===
The New York State Thruway uses emergency detour signs to divert traffic from the Thruway in the event of weather conditions or other emergencies.

=== Ohio ===
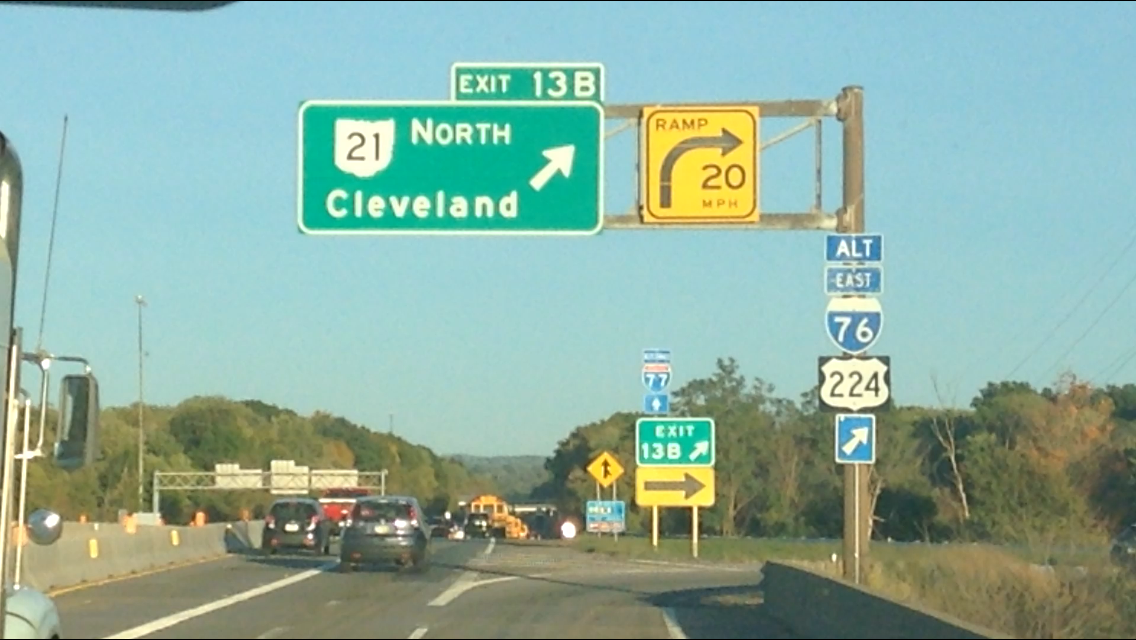
I-76, I-76/US 224 Alt, and I-77 alt at Ohio State Route 21 in Norton

Ohio has established a permanent detour scenario of Interstate 70 east of Columbus, due to frequent flooding.

Alternate Interstate routes also exist for I-70 near Dayton as well as for Interstate 76 and Interstate 77 in Summit County.

=== Pennsylvania ===
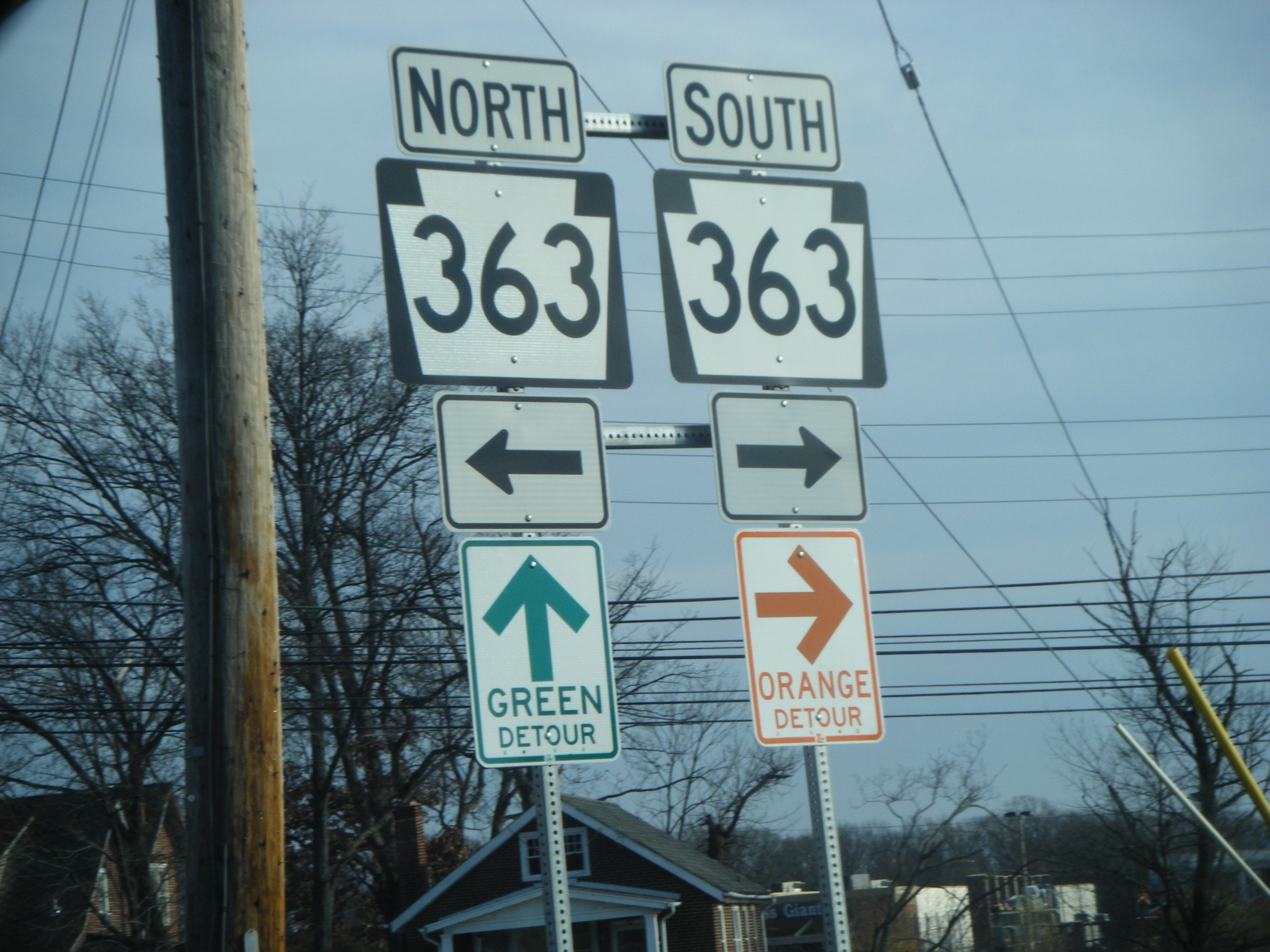
Green and orange detour signs in Pennsylvania

Pennsylvania has a system of "color detour signs" in which any detour follows signs with a specific color. The detours are meant to be used if a limited-access highway has to be closed for an emergency situation such as a flood or car accident, directing motorists along local roads near the limited-access highway to the next exit. According to a document produced by the Delaware Valley Regional Planning Commission containing information from the Pennsylvania Department of Transportation, they are generally color-coded according to direction, with blue meaning north, red meaning south, green meaning east, and orange meaning west, with other colors sometimes being used when detour routes overlap with one another. However, the Pennsylvania Department of Transportation's own sign manual recommends that only black, blue, or orange be used.

=== West Virginia ===
The West Virginia Turnpike has a series of lettered detours, first posted in early 2012, along its route.

=== Wisconsin ===
Wisconsin has "alternate route designations" on local surface roads and streets for all five primary interstate highways and three auxiliary interstates, along with several U.S. highways and state trunk highways.
