= Berford Lake =

Lake in Bruce County, Ontario, Canada

- lac Berford
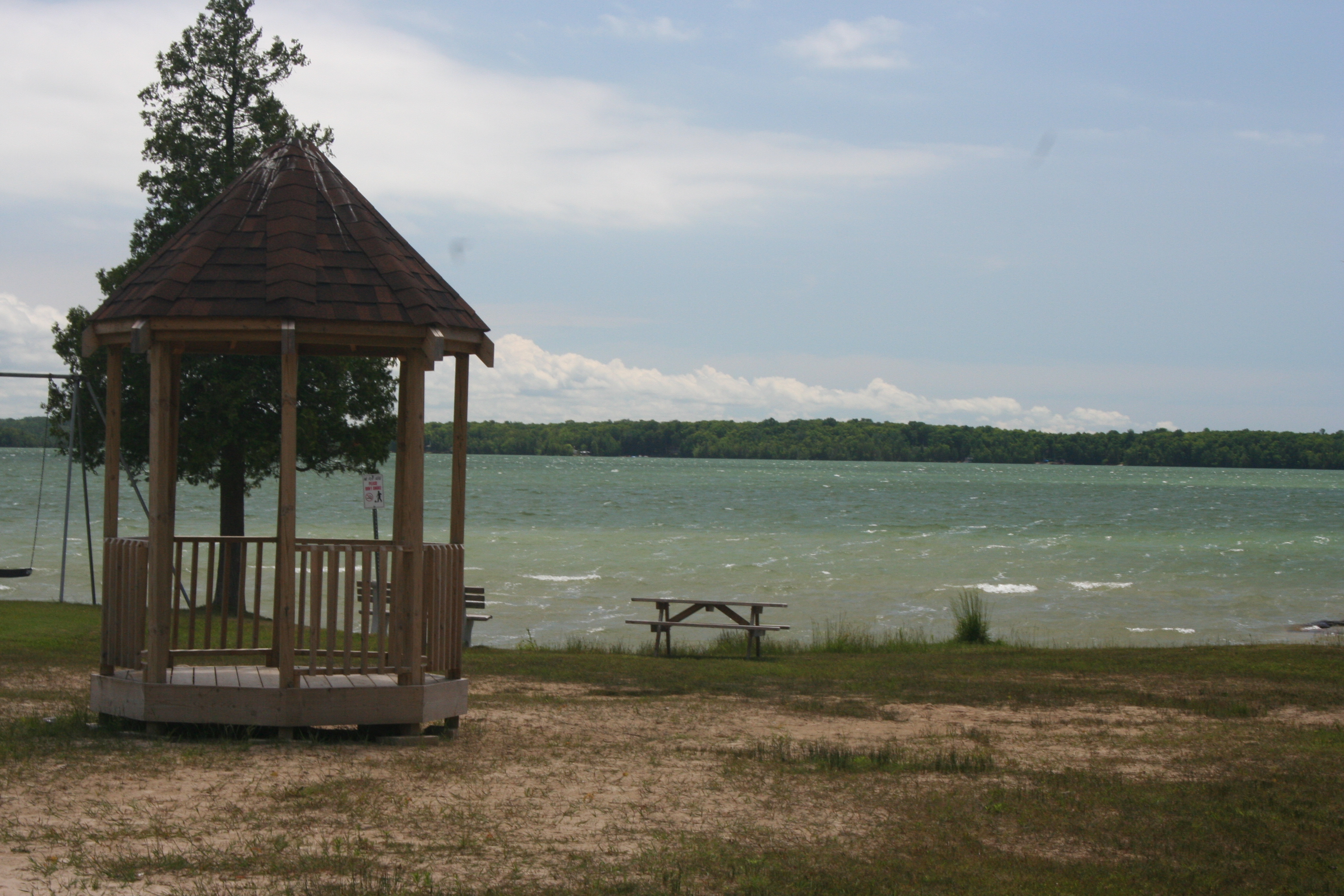

- Location in southern Ontario
- Location: Bruce County, Ontario
- Coordinates: 44°48′35″N 81°10′45″W
- Part of: Great Lakes Basin
- Primary outflows: Rankin River
- Basin countries: Canada
- Max. length: 3.6 km (2.2 mi)
- Max. width: 2.2 km (1.4 mi)
- Surface elevation: 209 m (686 ft)

Berford Lake (French: lac Berford) is a lake in South Bruce Peninsula, Bruce County in southwestern Ontario, Canada. It is the source of the Rankin River, is part of the Great Lakes Basin, and is about 7 kilometres (4.3 mi) northwest of the community of Wiarton.

The lake has several unnamed inflows at the east, southeast, and south. The primary outflow is the Rankin River, which flows via the Sauble River to Lake Huron.

== See also ==
- List of lakes in Ontario
