= Saugeen Kame Terraces =

Coordinates: 44°8′33″N 80°44′14″W

The Saugeen Kame Terraces is a 431-hectare provincially significant Earth Science Area of Natural and Scientific Interest in Ontario, Canada. It is in Grey County (in what was once Egremont Township), bounding the eastern and southern shores of Wilder Lake, a kettle lake, and is part of the larger Singhampton Kame Moraine formation. It is a kame formation that is the result of glacial retreat sediment deposition about 14,000 years ago.
