= Hepworth, Ontario =

Unincorporated community in Bruce County, Ontario, Canada

Coordinates: 44.633772°N 81.133302°W

Hepworth is an unincorporated community in Ontario, Canada. It is recognized as a designated place by Statistics Canada.

== Demographics ==
In the 2021 Census of Population conducted by Statistics Canada, Hepworth had a population of 519 living in 202 of its 207 total private dwellings, a change of 2.6% from its 2016 population of 506. With a land area of 3.55 km^{2} (1.37 sq mi), it had a population density of 146.2/km^{2} (378.6/sq mi) in 2021.

== See also ==
- List of communities in Ontario
- List of designated places in Ontario
