= Sauble Falls Provincial Park =

Provincial park in Ontario, Canada

- IUCN category II (national park)
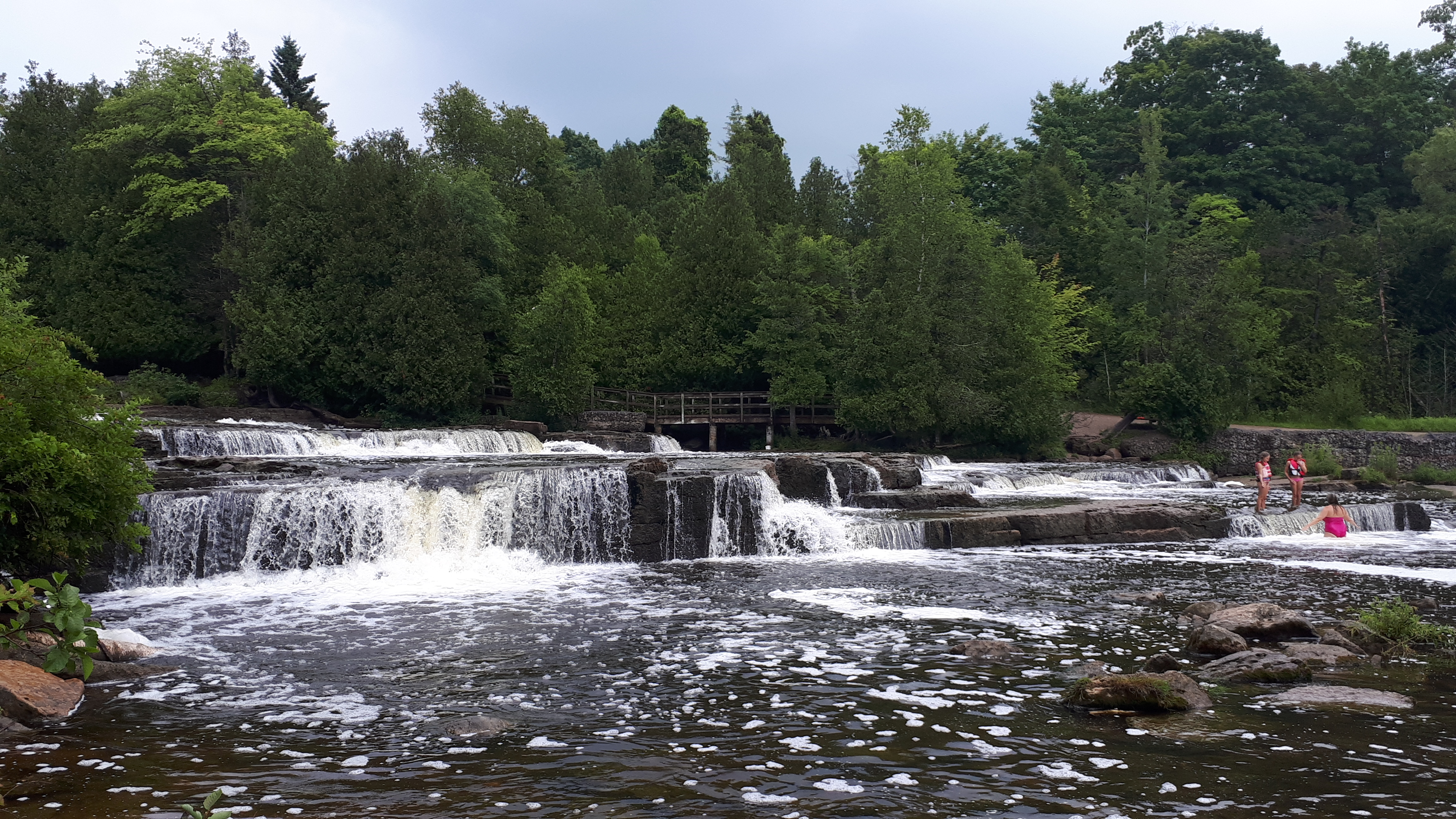

- Location within Southern Ontario
- Interactive map of Sauble Falls Provincial Park
- Location: Bruce County, Ontario, Canada
- Nearest city: Sauble Beach
- Coordinates: 44°40′32″N 81°15′24″W
- Area: 20.24 ha (50.0 acres)
- Designation: Recreational
- Established: 1960
- Visitors: 108,083 (in 2022)
- Governing body: Ontario Parks
- Website: www.ontarioparks.com/park/saublefalls

Sauble Falls Provincial Park is located in the town of South Bruce Peninsula, Bruce County in southwestern Ontario, Canada, 36 kilometres (22 mi) west of Owen Sound. It is in the lower drainage basin of the Sauble River, which flows into Lake Huron. The campground consists of two sections divided by County Road 13. The west section of the site is a quiet zone (no radios allowed). Group camping is available in the east section. Many sites along the east portion of the park back up against the Sauble River. The park is also the downstream terminus of the Rankin River canoe route.

The eponymous Sauble River meanders around the east section of the park and flows down under the county road to the falls. The majority of the falls are actually rapids to which many people take day trips to play in. There is a section in which people jump from a drop off into a pool in the river. Also in certain years it is possible to slide down the falls if water levels are high enough.

It is an operating park, requiring permits for day-use and overnight camping. Facilities include 152 car-accessible campsites, picnic shelter, playground, and docks. Services include interpretive and educational programs.

== History ==
The former town of Sauble Falls was founded in 1864 to support the logging industry. In 1867, a lumber mill was built at the falls (destroyed in 1937). Eventually it had a general store, blacksmith shop, post office, school, and two churches. Between 1905 and 1907, the Sauble Falls Light and Power Company built a hydroelectric generating station and dam (which became part of Ontario Hydro in 1929).

With the depletion of available lumber came the decline of the community. The mill ended operations in the late 1920s and the town site was gradually demolished in the 1950s. The park office and parts of the dam and power plant are the only town structures to remain.

In 1957 the lands were acquired by the province from Ontario Hydro and from other owners. In 1960, Sauble Falls Provincial Park was established.

== Nearby attractions ==
The park supports and complements other nearby tourism facilities and opportunities, such as summer attractions in Sauble Beach, a town with a fresh water beach at least 12 kilometres (7 mi) long.
