= Desboro, Ontario =

Community in Ontario, Canada

Coordinates: 44°23′56″N 80°59′20″W

Desboro is a community in Chatsworth Township, Grey County in southwestern Ontario, Canada, located south of Owen Sound and near the community of Chatsworth. The community was named for Desborough in Northamptonshire, England.
