= Tara, Ontario =

Tara
- Community
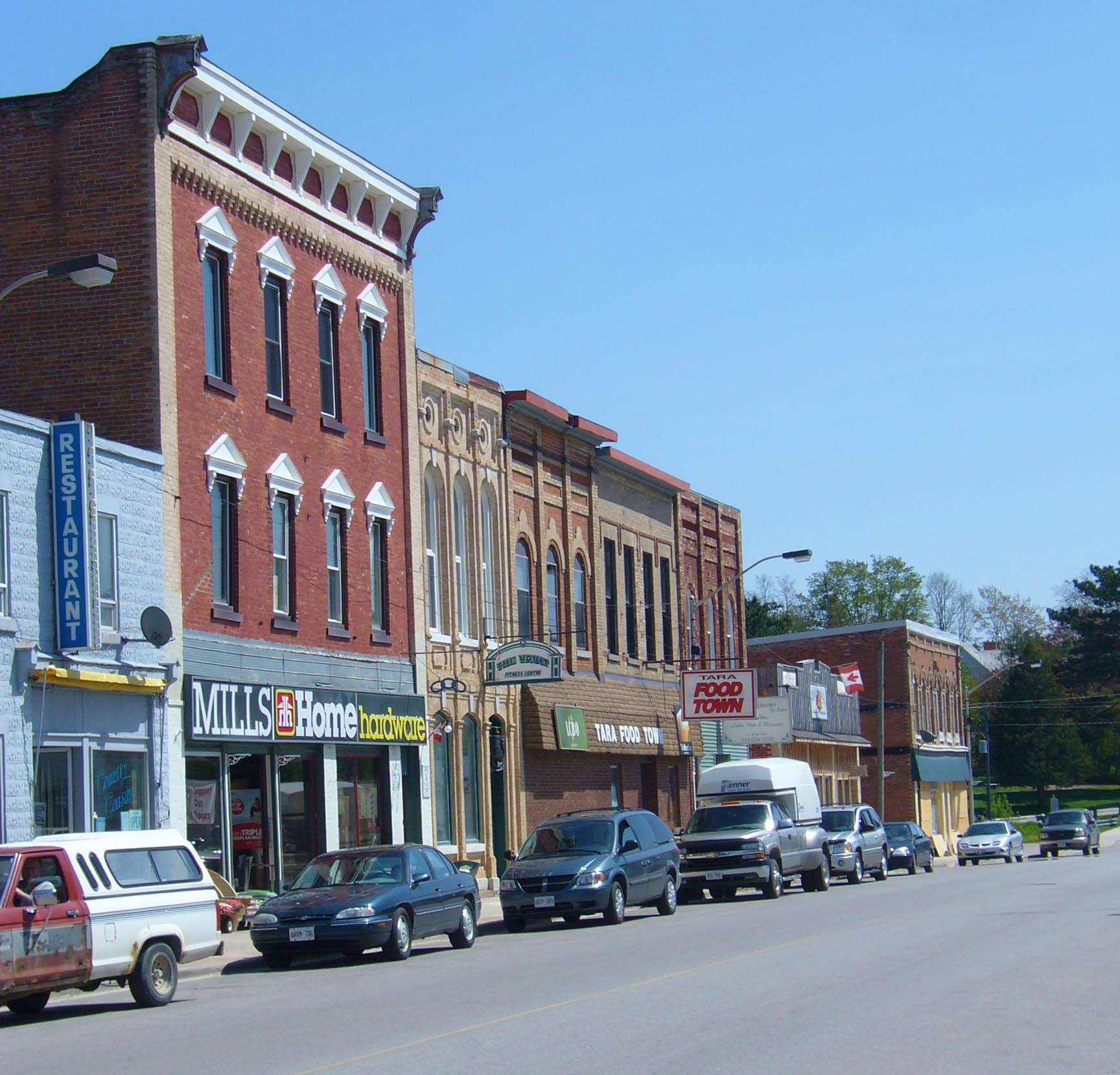
- View of Yonge Street
- Motto: Tarry Awhile in Tara
- Location in southern Ontario
- Coordinates: 44°28′40″N 81°08′44″W
- Country: Canada
- Province: Ontario
- County: Bruce
- Municipality: Arran–Elderslie

Area
  - Total: 2.39 km^{2} (0.92 sq mi)
- Elevation: 233 m (764 ft)

Population (2011)
  - Total: 1,037
  - Density: 434/km^{2} (1,120/sq mi)
- Time zone: UTC-5 (Eastern Time Zone)
  - Summer (DST): UTC-4 (Eastern Time Zone)
- Postal Code: N0H 2N0
- Area codes: 519, 226, 548

Tara is an unincorporated community in the municipality of Arran–Elderslie, Bruce County, in southwestern Ontario, Canada. It is a designated place and had 1,037 residents and 458 dwellings as of the 2011 census. Tara is in geographic Arran Township and is located on the Sauble River. It has an area of 2.39 square kilometres (0.92 sq mi) and an urban area that covers 63.5 square kilometres (24.5 sq mi).

Tara is in the federal electoral district of Bruce—Grey—Owen Sound and in the provincial electoral district of the same name.

A railway point called "Tara Siding" is south of the community on the opposite bank of the Sauble River. It was created in 1855 by the building of the Stratford and Huron Railway, and abandoned 1993.

== History ==
Richard Berford and John Hamilton were the first European settlers to move onto and survey the lots of the future village of Tara in 1851. The opening of the road from Southampton to Owen Sound in 1852 helped the early growth of the community, as the village is located approximately half-way in between the two larger towns. Shortly after, Hamilton opened a hotel, serving the incoming settlers of the surrounding townships. A post-office opened in 1862 with the name, Eblana, however it was changed the following year to Tara, after a town in County Meath, Ireland which served as the seat of Irish royalty. In 1880, the local newspaper, The Tara Leader was first published, and the following year the railroad was built to the community and the first locomotive arrived.

In 1855, a sawmill opened by H. W. M. Richards, becoming the first manufacturing industry; a grist mill was added to it in 1857. Two years later, a large foundry and agricultural implement works was started by W. A. Gerolamy. Other earlier businesses included a steam sawmill, a woolen mill and a potash factory. The first post office opened in 1862. The railway reached Tara in October 1881. The village never did become a major manufacturing centre.

A historic plaque at Tara reads:

Soon after the survey of Arran Township was completed in 1851. John Hamilton and Richard Berford, early settlers in the area, located here along the Sauble River. The opening of the Owen Sound Post road stimulated the growth of a small community and in 1858 Berford registered a village plan. Situated in a rich agricultural region with abundant water power, the settlement developed quickly. By 1861 it contained saw and grist mills, a foundry producing agricultural implements, wagon works and a tannery, and the following year a post office was established. Tara became a thriving commercial and manufacturing centre and, in anticipation of the arrival of the Stratford and Huron Railway, it was incorporated as a village by a county by-law effective January 1, 1881.

== Demographics ==
In the 2021 Census of Population conducted by Statistics Canada, Tara had a population of 1,119 living in 462 of its 476 total private dwellings, a change of −1.7% from its 2016 population of 1,138. With a land area of 2.4 km^{2} (0.93 sq mi), it had a population density of 466.3/km^{2} (1,207.6/sq mi) in 2021.

== Arts and culture ==
The Arran-Tara Agricultural Society holds an annual fair, the Arran-Tara Fall Fair; it was first held in 1858.

The Tara Santa Claus Parade is held every year on the first weekend of December.

Tara has four churches:

- Christ Anglican Church, affiliated with the Anglican Church of Canada; part of the Diocese of Huron, Parish of Chesley, Tara, Paisley, Desboro and Walter's Falls; located at 102 Bruce County Rd 17
- Tara United Church, affiliated with the United Church of Canada
- Cornerstone Presbyterian Church, affiliated with the Presbyterian Church in Canada; formed in 2008 by the amalgamation of Knox Presbyterian in Tara and the Presbyterian church in the nearby community of Allenford.
- Glad Tidings Mennonite Fellowship Church

== Education ==
Tara's elementary school is the Arran-Tara Elementary School, part of the Bluewater District School Board; there are no secondary or Catholic separate schools in Tara.

== Bus Transportation ==
- Voyago (buses from Hanover, Ontario) (formerly Kunkel Bus Lines) (formerly for Arran-Tara Elementary School students) same with Chesley
- First Student Canada (buses from Kincardine/Port Elgin, Ontario) (currently for Arran-Tara Elementary School students) (High school students bused to Port Elgin)
- Wathke Bus Lines (buses from Desboro, Ontario) (for Arran-Tara Elementary School students)

== Notable people ==
- Cyclone Taylor - professional hockey player
- William Howard Hearst - Premier of Ontario
- Whitford Julian VanDusen - Canadian lumber magnate and philanthropist
