= Sauble River (Ontario) =

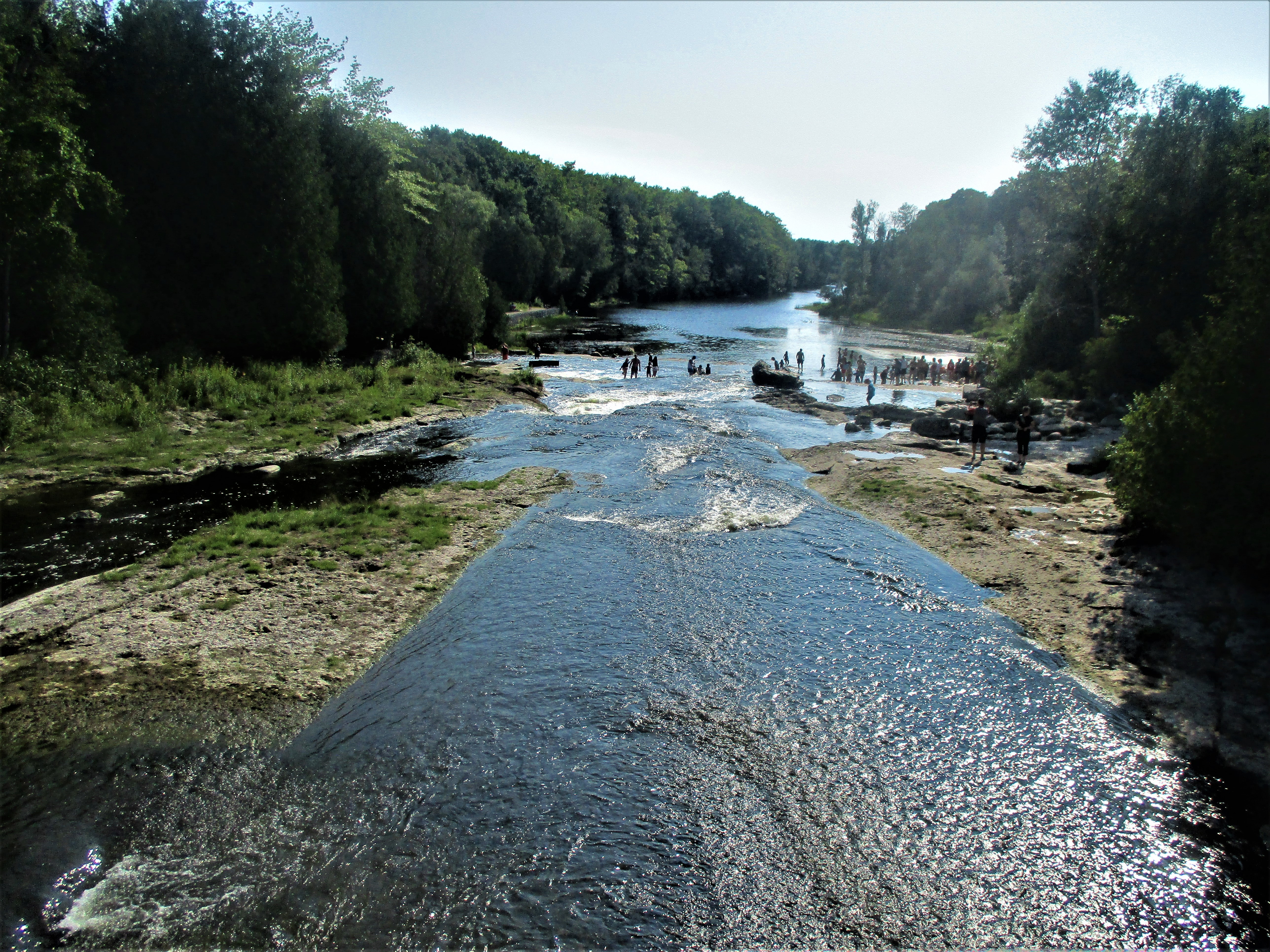

- Location of the mouth of the Sauble River in southern Ontario
- Etymology: From the French Riviere aux Saubles for "sandy river"

Location
- Country: Canada
- Province: Ontario
- Region: Southwestern Ontario
- Counties: Bruce; Grey

Physical characteristics
- Source: Unnamed pond
  - location: Chatsworth, Grey County
  - coordinates: 44°21′08″N 80°58′55″W
  - elevation: 305 m (1,001 ft)
- Mouth: Lake Huron
  - location: Sauble Beach, South Bruce Peninsula, Bruce County
  - coordinates: 44°39′42″N 81°16′45″W
  - elevation: 176 m (577 ft)

Basin features
- River system: Lake Huron drainage basin
- Tributaries
  - right: Rankin River

The Sauble River is a river in Bruce County and Grey County in southwestern Ontario, Canada that flows from its headwaters in the township of Chatsworth to Lake Huron north of the community of Sauble Beach.

== Etymology ==
The river was originally called Rivière aux Saubles, or "sandy river", by the French. It was named the River aux Saubles on maps until 1881, when it became the Sauble River. When first settled, the area included a sawmill and later, a hydro electric plant.

== Course ==
The Sauble River begins at an unnamed pond in the township of Chatsworth in Grey County, between the communities of Desboro to the north and Mooresburg to the south. It heads north then west, takes in the left tributary Grimston Creek and right tributary Keady Creek, passes along the border to the municipality of Arran–Elderslie in Bruce County near the community of Grimston, before entering that municipality and reaching the community of Tara, where it takes in the left tributary Tara Creek. The river continues north, takes in the left tributary Arkwright Creek, passes through the community of Allenford, and reaches the municipality of South Bruce Peninsula. It then heads northeast, takes in the right tributary Park Head Creek, and turns west west of the community of Hepworth. The river takes in the right tributaries Spring Creek and Rankin River, passes over the Sauble Falls, and reaches Lake Huron at Sauble Beach.

== Natural history ==
Sauble Falls Provincial Park is located at the eponymous waterfalls.

The river hosts fish species such as brown trout, chinook salmon, coho salmon, largemouth bass, northern pike, panfish, rainbow trout and walleye. The south (upper) Sauble River drainage basin has fair (15 to 20%) forest cover and poor (12.5 to 25%) riparian zone forest cover, fair water quality and good benthic species; the north (lower) drainage basin has excellent (greater than 35%) forest cover and fair (25% to 50%) riparian zone forest cover, excellent water chemistry and good benthic species.

== Tributaries ==
- Rankin River (right)
- Spring Creek (right)
- Park Head Creek (right)
- Arkwright Creek (left)
- Tara Creek (left)
- Keady Creek (right)
- Grimston Creek (left)

== Communities ==
- Sauble Beach
- Allenford
- Tara
- Grimston

== See also ==
- List of rivers of Ontario

== Sources ==
- "Sauble River". Geographical Names Data Base. Natural Resources Canada.
- "Sauble River". Atlas of Canada. Natural Resources Canada. 2010-02-04. Shows the river course.
- Grey Sauble Conservation Property Map (PDF) (Map). 1 : 175000. Grey Sauble Conservation. Archived from the original (PDF) on 2011-09-27.
