= Chatsworth, Ontario =

Chatsworth
- Township (lower-tier)
- Township of Chatsworth
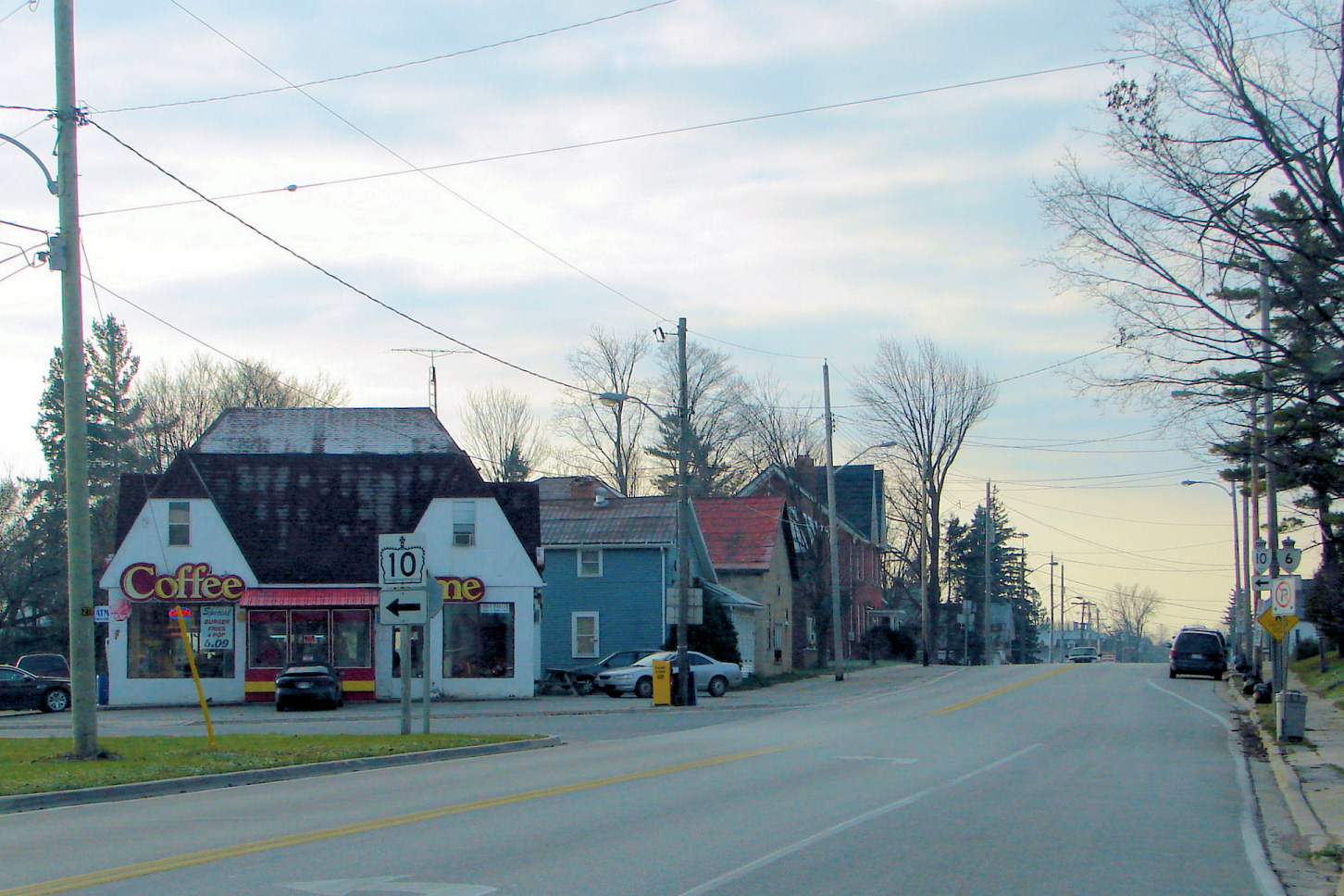

- Location within Grey County Location within Southern Ontario
- Coordinates: 44°22′54″N 80°53′18″W
- Country: Canada
- Province: Ontario
- County: Grey
- Formed: January 1, 2000

Government
  - Mayor: Scott Mackey
  - Fed. riding: Bruce—Grey—Owen Sound
  - Prov. riding: Bruce—Grey—Owen Sound

Area
  - Land: 594.44 km^{2} (229.51 sq mi)

Population (2021)
  - Total: 7,080
  - Density: 11.9/km^{2} (31/sq mi)
- Time zone: UTC-5 (EST)
  - Summer (DST): UTC-4 (EDT)
- Postal Code: N0H 1G0
- Area codes: 519, 226, 548
- Highways: Highway 10; Highway 6
- Website: chatsworth.ca

Chatsworth is a township municipality in Grey County, in southwestern Ontario, Canada. The township is located at the headwaters of the Styx River, the Saugeen River, the Sauble River, the Bighead River, the Spey River, and the Sydenham River.

The current township was formed on January 1, 2000, when Holland Township, Sullivan Township, and the Village of Chatsworth were amalgamated. The first white settlers arrived in this area in the early 19th century, and a significant amount of settlement was underway in mid-to-late 1800s.

The Canadian suffragette and activist Nellie McClung was born in the town of Chatsworth.

The Sullivan Township area has a large Amish population.

== Communities ==
In addition to the namesake community of Chatsworth itself, the township comprises the communities of:

- Arnott
- Berkeley
- Desboro
- Dornoch
- Glascott
- Grimston
- Harkaway
- Hemstock Mill
- Holford
- Holland Centre
- Keady
- Keward
- Kinghurst
- Lily Oak
- Lueck Mill
- Marmion
- Massie
- Mooresburg
- Mount Pleasant
- Peabody
- Scone
- Strathaven
- Walters Falls
- Williams Lake
- Williamsford

=== Arnott ===
Arnott's first post office opened on January 4, 1868. Arnott's location has not been shown on road maps since 1976 when Highway 10 was surveyed and rerouted. Arnott had a population of 70 in 1864; it was approximately 50 in 1887. The hamlet was originally called "Murray's Corner" but was renamed "Arnott" after a Francis Arnott who was given a grant to settle the area.

=== Berkeley ===
The post office in Berkeley was established in 1853 when the settlement was originally called "Holland". It was renamed "Berkeley" in 1857. The post office also housed the general store which operated under various proprietors until 1974 when it was phased out of operation.

=== Chatsworth ===
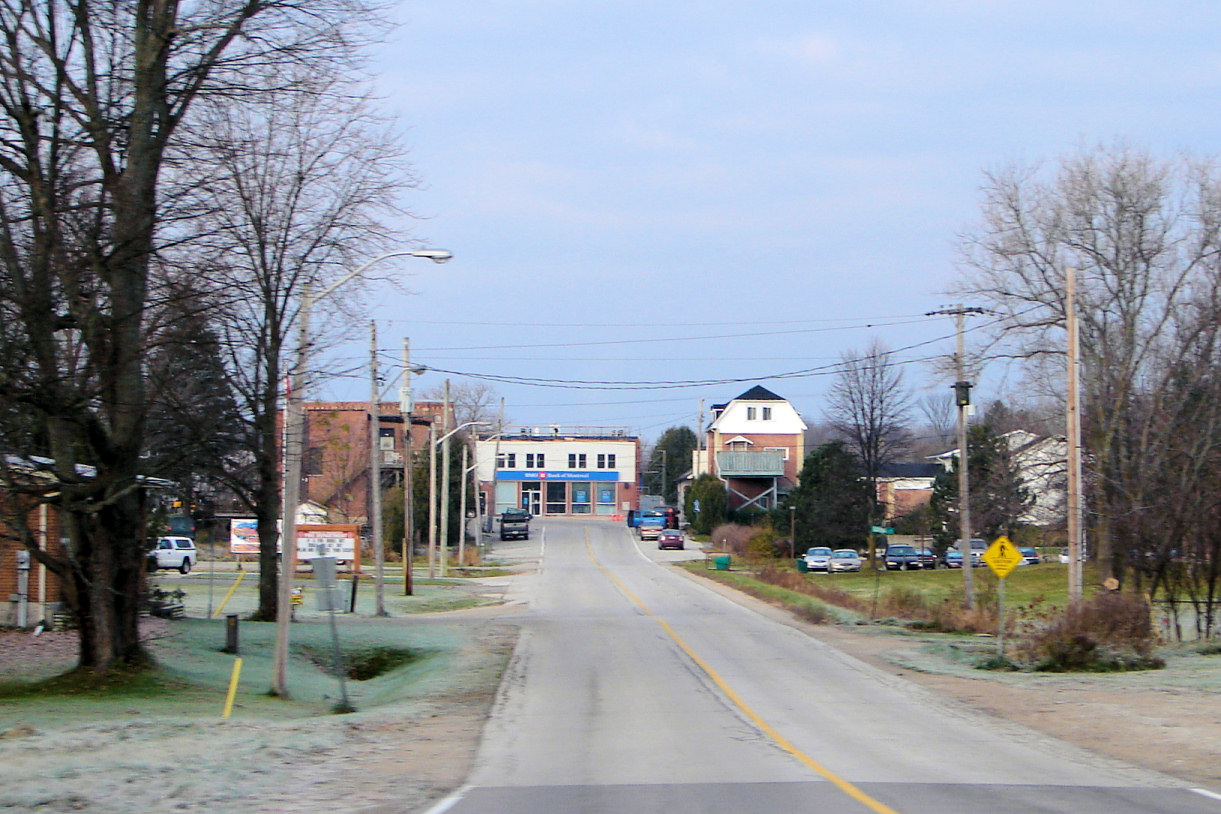
Chatsworth

Inside the township of Chatsworth sits the village of Chatsworth, Ontario, where Highways 6 and 10 meet and continue together to Owen Sound. Chatsworth was settled in 1842 when a man named Coyer built a tavern.

Chatsworth had a weekly newspaper called Chatsworth News which ran from 1885 to 1935. It had a competitor called Chatsworth Banner which was also weekly and ran from 1896 to 1907.

==== Recreation ====
Chatsworth featured a hockey arena which closed on 30 September 2017.

The half-century-old Chatsworth Community Centre closed for good on 30 September 2017

Chatsworth Township Mayor Bob Pringle said the costs to deal with the building's structural issues, which were outlined in an April 2017 report by GM BluePlan engineers, and to bring the arena up to today's standards are not financially feasible for the township.

He said council unanimously approved a motion to shutter the facility Wednesday.

"The engineer's report pointed out some deficiencies that needed to be addressed for public safety. And then council with staff had to find some costs and come to some hard decisions and recommendations. The decision was made that it would close,

Source: Owen Sound Suntimes

As well a baseball diamond. It is home to the local Chatsworth Rebels.

=== Desboro ===
The village of Desboro saw its first building in 1856. It was a log school house. The area was originally called Brown's Corners. At some point its name was changed to Donnybrook and then to Desborough after a village in central England. The first house and store were built in 1866 by George Smith. The Desboro hotel was built in 1869 and was one of the only rural taverns still operating in the township before it closed in 2011. The town hall was built in 1875 and enlarged to a two-storey building in 1950.

Desboro is about 13 kilometres west of Chatsworth and Williamsford.

==== Recreation ====
Desboro features a modern hockey arena which was built in 1956 and has since been significantly renovated. The community grounds also contains two baseball diamonds.

=== Dornoch ===
The village of Dornoch was settled by Bartholomew Griffin in 1841 when he encountered a crossroads that appealed to him. The area was originally called "Griffin's Corners" after Griffin started the first general store. In the late 1850s the village was served by a stage coach that was running between Durham and Chatsworth. Around the turn of the century, the name was changed to Dornoch after the village in northern Scotland. The community centre was built in 1952 and still serves Dornoch.

Dornoch is situated between Williamsford and Durham on Highway 6 and is 33 kilometers south of Owen Sound.

=== Harkaway ===
The Harkaway post office was established on May 1, 1875. It was closed in 1913 after rural mail delivery started in the area.

Harkaway is 10 kilometres east of Holland Centre.

=== Holland Centre ===
In the 1870s, local farmers got together under the leadership of Alfred Williams and got a railway station built. Williams built a general store. With well-travelled roads and a railway station, Holland Centre was well established as a lumber town. It was named 'Williamsford' after the prominent resident, but with another village bearing the same name only a few miles away, it was changed to 'Holland Centre' because of its location at the centre of Holland Township.

The village sits on Highway 10 and is about 10 kilometres southeast of Chatsworth.

==== Recreation ====
Holland Centre features a community centre and a baseball diamond. The diamond is home to the Hawks (youth softball), and men's and ladies' Slow pitch. There is a hardball-like diamond on the other side; however, it rarely gets used and only for the youth tournaments. The Holland Center Hall is just beside the diamond.

=== Keady ===
Keady saw its first settlers in the 1850s. The original general store was built in the late 1860s and operated for almost 100 years before being converted into a residence.

Keady is well known in the region for its popular farmers market.

=== Lily Oak ===
Lily Oak is a farming community. The post office was closed in 1914 when rural mail delivery was started.

Lily Oak is about 8 kilometres east of Holland Centre.

=== Massie ===
The hamlet of Massie sits in the valley of the Bighead River and had settlers in the area in the 1840s. Charles Winter bought 200 acres in 1854 and the land was apportioned to various people after that. The sawmill was built in 1859 and the grist mill was built in 1863. By 1866 it also had a post office, blacksmith shop, horse shoe nail factory and a school house. There were approximately 100 people living in Massie in 1887.

Massie sits on Massie Road between Chatsworth and Walters Falls.

=== Strathaven ===
The hamlet of Strathaven was developing in the 1850s and in 1887 had a population of about 50 people.

Strathaven is about 6 kilometres west of Walters Falls.

=== Walters Falls ===
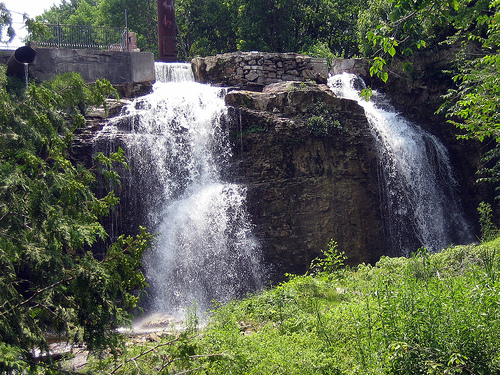
Walters Falls - view from below

Walters Falls was founded in 1852 when John Walter of Toronto took up 300 acres of wild land on the south branch of the Bighead River. Walter set up a sawmill in 1853 with a new one being erected in 1864. This mill operated inside the village of Walters Falls which built up around it. By 1865 the town was served by a grist mill, a woolen mill, a post office, a tavern, a blacksmith, a wagon maker, two carpenters, a millwright and a tinsmith. There is conflicting information on page 149 of The Paths that Led to Holland which states that "John Walter and his Wife Elizabeth Payne, filed entry in the District Registry Office in Durham in 1850 for 800 acres that built mills which included a grist mill, carding and saw mill."

In 1882–83 the first general store was opened in the village.

The main sawmill in the village was purchased by the Hallman family in 1944 and rebuilt after it had lain mostly idle for 22 years. It burned down on October 15, 1984 and was still utilizing a water-driven turbine up to that point to provide one-third of its energy. The fire was likely caused by an electrical accident. A new facility was rebuilt on the outskirts of the village and started operations in March 1986. The original sawmill was used for storage until the early 2000s when the remaining building was demolished and an inn was built in its place. The area surrounding the inn features a river, a dam, a large waterfall and a forest with outcroppings of the Niagara Escarpment. The area is maintained in a picturesque condition and is considered a local tourist attraction. The waterfall is just one of many in Grey County.

In the mid-1850s, John Walter also set up the feed mill which is still in operation as Walters Falls Milling Ltd., still operating on water driven machinery most of the year with a diesel engine. It suffered a fire in 1923 and was rebuilt on the same site.

The village had a population of about 200 people in 1887.

Surrounded by rolling farmland and bush, Walters Falls also sees the Bruce Trail running along the Bighead River through the bush behind the Falls Inn.

==== Walters Falls Community Centre ====
The Community Centre Hall was built over the period of 1883–1889. Gas lights were installed in 1923 and were replaced in 1931 when the hall was wired for electricity at a cost of $137.50. The wall behind the stage was painted by local artist Garnet Hazard in 1948 and has become an iconic fixture of the hall. It took almost 15 years for the residents of Walters Falls to convince the hall board that indoor plumbed washrooms were necessary so they finally succumbed and had them constructed in 1975.

The residents of Walters Falls celebrated the 100th birthday of the community centre on July 8, 1989. There was a parade, a horseshoe tournament and a baseball game. The evening included a concert.

=== Williams Lake ===
Williams Lake is a popular lake for fishing and boating in Chatsworth Township sitting between Williamsford and Holland Centre. It is a 148-acre clover-shaped body of water which was named after the Williams family that owned a large portion of the lake. It has a distinctive clover shape and features a public beach with boat launch which is located amongst the approximately 60 homes and cottages built on the shore of the lake. The first cottage built was on an island in 1948.

In 1973, a large portion on the southeast side was preserved as natural land when it was purchased by the North Grey Conservation Authority.

A railroad was built to Williams Lake in 1899 in order to dig up the grey muck known as 'marl' which is prominent at the lake. The marl was excavated for the use of three cement plants in nearby Owen Sound as an ingredient for their product. The process of excavating the marl caused the water supply to dry up and several wells had to be dug on nearby farms by the excavation company.

The Glendale Yacht Club sits on private property at the north side of the lake which they moved to in 1984 after using leased property for the prior 30 years. There is a well-equipped club house, boat docks, a beach, and camp sites.

=== Williamsford ===
Williamsford is a village on the North Saugeen River in Grey County, Ontario, Canada (Chatsworth Township). It has a general store, post office, a bookstore and restaurant housed in an historic grain mill. A small dam controls the North Saugeen River. It has several churches, and a community cemetery. It is located on Highway 6 between Durham and Owen Sound.

The village of Williamsford was first surveyed in 1858 comprising 400 acres in preparation for a railway which was to run from Toronto to Owen Sound. Each township was to contribute $40,000 to its construction. The post office was built in 1847 and the general store was built in the late 1800s.

==== Recreation ====
At the south end of the village sit the community centre grounds. The grounds contain a playground, a baseball diamond and a newly built curling rink. The curling rink which was completed in 2010 consists of a lounge and two rinks.

The community was previously served by a hockey arena with the original attached curling rink. The arena was planned in 1954 and opened officially in 1956 and was torn down in 2008.

== Climate ==
Climate data for Chatsworth, Ontario (1981−2010)
Month	Jan	Feb	Mar	Apr	May	Jun	Jul	Aug	Sep	Oct	Nov	Dec	Year
Record high °C (°F)	14.0 (57.2)	17.0 (62.6)	23.0 (73.4)	29.0 (84.2)	33.0 (91.4)	36.7 (98.1)	38.3 (100.9)	35.6 (96.1)	36.1 (97.0)	28.9 (84.0)	21.0 (69.8)	18.0 (64.4)	38.3 (100.9)
Mean daily maximum °C (°F)	−3.0 (26.6)	−1.6 (29.1)	3.1 (37.6)	10.8 (51.4)	17.6 (63.7)	22.8 (73.0)	25.2 (77.4)	24.1 (75.4)	20.0 (68.0)	12.9 (55.2)	5.9 (42.6)	0.0 (32.0)	11.5 (52.7)
Daily mean °C (°F)	−6.9 (19.6)	−6.1 (21.0)	−2.0 (28.4)	5.3 (41.5)	11.5 (52.7)	16.5 (61.7)	19.1 (66.4)	18.3 (64.9)	14.5 (58.1)	8.3 (46.9)	2.4 (36.3)	−3.4 (25.9)	6.5 (43.7)
Mean daily minimum °C (°F)	−10.9 (12.4)	−10.6 (12.9)	−7.1 (19.2)	−0.2 (31.6)	5.3 (41.5)	10.3 (50.5)	13.1 (55.6)	12.5 (54.5)	9.0 (48.2)	3.6 (38.5)	−1.1 (30.0)	−6.8 (19.8)	1.4 (34.5)
Record low °C (°F)	−35.6 (−32.1)	−35.0 (−31.0)	−32.0 (−25.6)	−20.0 (−4.0)	−7.8 (18.0)	−2.8 (27.0)	1.7 (35.1)	−0.6 (30.9)	−3.5 (25.7)	−8.3 (17.1)	−20.6 (−5.1)	−30.0 (−22.0)	−35.6 (−32.1)
Average precipitation mm (inches)	116.1 (4.57)	87.8 (3.46)	73.4 (2.89)	73.2 (2.88)	92.8 (3.65)	80.8 (3.18)	85.0 (3.35)	99.7 (3.93)	117.5 (4.63)	105.6 (4.16)	121.5 (4.78)	124.7 (4.91)	1,178 (46.38)
Average rainfall mm (inches)	23.0 (0.91)	26.2 (1.03)	42.4 (1.67)	63.9 (2.52)	92.6 (3.65)	80.8 (3.18)	85.0 (3.35)	99.7 (3.93)	117.5 (4.63)	102.8 (4.05)	83.0 (3.27)	38.5 (1.52)	855.4 (33.68)
Average snowfall cm (inches)	93.1 (36.7)	61.6 (24.3)	31.0 (12.2)	9.3 (3.7)	0.2 (0.1)	0.0 (0.0)	0.0 (0.0)	0.0 (0.0)	0.0 (0.0)	2.7 (1.1)	38.5 (15.2)	86.2 (33.9)	322.6 (127.0)
Average precipitation days (≥ 0.2 mm)	19.7	14.7	12.5	13.4	13.8	12.8	11.6	13.3	14.8	17.9	18.1	18.8	181.4
Average rainy days (≥ 0.2 mm)	3.7	3.4	6.5	11.9	13.8	12.8	11.6	13.3	14.8	17.7	13.2	5.9	128.5
Average snowy days (≥ 0.2 cm)	17.2	12.2	7.3	2.6	0.12	0.0	0.0	0.0	0.0	0.85	6.7	13.9	60.8
Source: Environment Canada

== Demographics ==
In the 2021 Census of Population conducted by Statistics Canada, Chatsworth had a population of 7,080 living in 2,699 of its 3,094 total private dwellings, a change of 6.8% from its 2016 population of 6,630. With a land area of 594.44 km^{2} (229.51 sq mi), it had a population density of 11.9/km^{2} (30.8/sq mi) in 2021.

Historical census populations – Chatsworth, Ontario

Year	Pop.	±%
1996	6,278	—
2001	6,280	+0.0%
2006	6,392	+1.8%

Year	Pop.	±%
2011	6,437	+0.7%
2016	6,630	+3.0%
2021	7,080	+6.8%

Source: Statistics Canada

== Government ==
The township is led by a municipal council consisting of a Mayor, a Deputy Mayor and three Council Members. The current Council, elected in 2026, comprises Shawn Greig as Mayor; Diana Rae as Deputy mayor; and Margie Stafford, J.D Ceaser and Chris Evans as Councillors.

== Hungerford's crawling water beetle ==
A short stretch of the North Saugeen River just over the Bruce County border at the Chatsworth community of Scone is home to one of the most critically endangered of all insects: the Hungerford's crawling water beetle. The only known population of Hungerford's crawling water beetles outside of the United States was discovered near there in 1986 when 42 beetles were identified at a site downstream from the community's dam. An unspecified number of beetles were last recorded in 2001, but surveys in 2002 uncovered no specimens. As a result, the status of this population of Hungerford's crawling water beetles is uncertain at present. In 2011, there were no signs of the beetle.

Although the Hungerford's crawling water beetle was categorized as endangered on March 7, 1994, under the provisions of the U.S. Endangered Species Act, it is currently [when?] not protected in Canada.

== See also ==
- List of townships in Ontario
