= Rankin River =

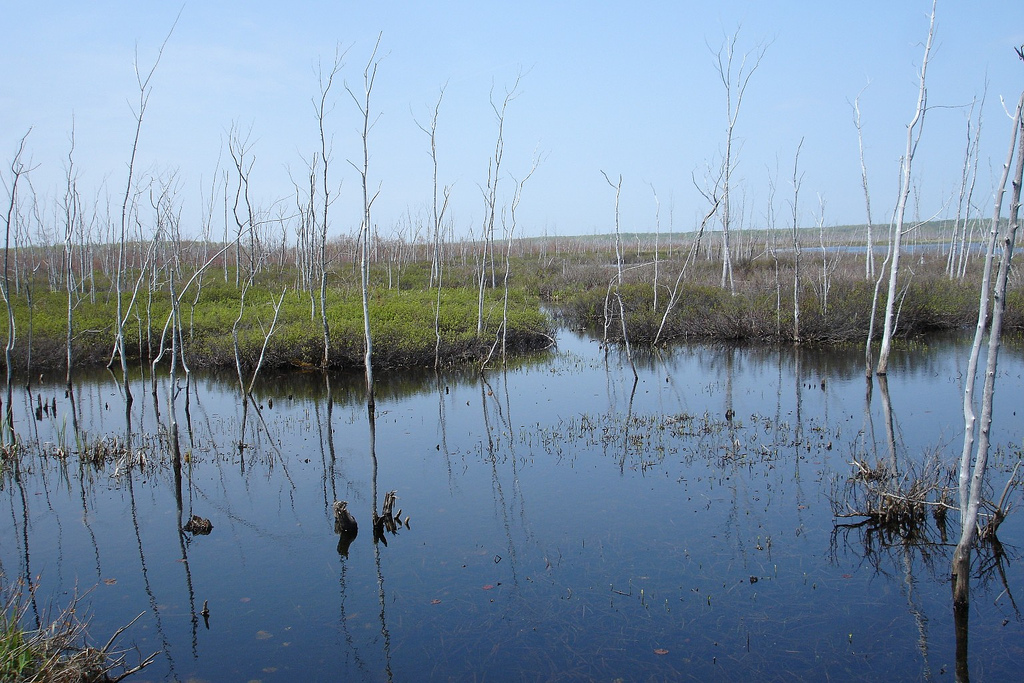

- Location of the mouth of the Rankin River in southern Ontario
- Etymology: Named after Charles Rankin

Location
- Country: Canada
- Province: Ontario
- Region: Southwestern Ontario
- County: Bruce
- Town: South Bruce Peninsula

Physical characteristics
- Source: Berford Lake
  - coordinates: 44°48′33″N 81°11′32″W
  - elevation: 208 m (682 ft)
- Mouth: Sauble River
  - coordinates: 44°40′39″N 81°15′02″W
  - elevation: 181 m (594 ft)

Basin features
- River system: Lake Huron drainage basin
- Tributaries
  - left: Clavering Creek
  - right: Albemarle Brook

The Rankin River is a river in the town of South Bruce Peninsula, Bruce County in southwestern Ontario, Canada which flows from the east side of the Bruce Peninsula to join the Sauble River near Sauble Falls Provincial Park on the west side. The river is in the Lake Huron drainage basin and was named after Charles Rankin, who first surveyed the Bruce Peninsula.

== Course ==
The Rankin River begins at Berford Lake about 1.5 kilometres (0.9 mi) southeast of the community of Mar, and flows west over Berford Dam, then under Ontario Highway 6 to Isaac Lake, where it takes in the right tributary Albemarle Brook arriving from Sky Lake. The river heads south to Boat Lake where it receives the left tributary Clavering Creek at Jordan Bay. It heads south out of the lake over Rankin Dam, then southwest to its mouth at the Sauble River, just upriver of the community of Sauble Falls.

In addition to the Rankin River drainage basin lying in the town of South Bruce Peninsula in Bruce County, portions of the tributary Clavering Creek drainage basin lie in Georgian Bluffs in Grey County.

== History ==
During the 18th century, this river was part of a portage from Georgian Bay across the Bruce Peninsula used by fur traders. In the second half of the 19th century, large numbers of passenger pigeons nested along the river. The river is now popular for recreational canoeing and kayaking.

== Natural history ==
The river hosts fish species such as bass, Bowfin, northern pike, pickerel and perch, as well as trout and salmon during their spawning seasons. Whereas the entire Rankin River drainage basin has excellent (greater than 35%) forest cover, the riparian zones have only fair (25% to 50%) forest cover. Water chemistry was excellent but benthic species were only fair.

== Tributaries ==
- Clavering Creek (left)
- Albemarle Brook (right)

== See also ==
- List of rivers of Ontario

== Sources ==
- "Rankin River". Geographical Names Data Base. Natural Resources Canada.
- Grey Sauble Conservation Property Map (PDF) (Map). 1 : 175000. Grey Sauble Conservation. Archived from the original (PDF) on 2011-09-27.
