= List of members of the Canadian House of Commons (H) =

== Hab–Hal ==
- Joseph-Anaclet Habel b. 1895 first elected in 1953 as Liberal member for Cochrane, Ontario.
- Edward Hackett b. 1840 first elected in 1878 as Liberal-Conservative member for Prince County, Prince Edward Island.
- John Thomas Hackett b. 1884 first elected in 1930 as Conservative member for Stanstead, Quebec.
- George Haddow b. 1833 first elected in 1878 as Independent member for Restigouche, New Brunswick.
- Albert Hagar b. 1827 first elected in 1867 as Liberal member for Prescott, Ontario.
- Alexander Haggart b. 1848 first elected in 1908 as Conservative member for Winnipeg, Manitoba.
- John Graham Haggart b. 1836 first elected in 1872 as Conservative member for Lanark South, Ontario.
- David George Hahn b. 1925 first elected in 1963 as Liberal member for Broadview, Ontario.
- Frederick George Hahn b. 1911 first elected in 1953 as Social Credit member for New Westminster, British Columbia.
- Stanley Haidasz b. 1923 first elected in 1957 as Liberal member for Trinity, Ontario.
- Patty Hajdu b. 1966 first elected in 2015 as Liberal member for Thunder Bay—Superior North, Ontario.
- Robert Henry Halbert b. 1870 first elected in 1919 as Independent member for Ontario North, Ontario.
- Frederick Harding Hale b. 1844 first elected imam 1887 as Liberal-Conservative member for Carleton, New Brunswick.
- Alfred Dryden Hales b. 1909 first elected in 1957 as Progressive Conservative member for Wellington South, Ontario.
- Allen Haley b. 1844 first elected in 1896 as Liberal member for Hants, Nova Scotia.
- Charles E. Haliburton b. 1938 first elected in 1972 as Progressive Conservative member for South Western Nova, Nova Scotia.
- James Hall b. 1806 first elected in 1874 as Liberal member for Peterborough East, Ontario.
- Robert Newton Hall b. 1836 first elected in 1882 as Liberal-Conservative member for Town of Sherbrooke, Quebec.
- Robert Richard Hall b. 1865 first elected in 1904 as Liberal member for Peterborough West, Ontario.
- Walter Allan Hall b. 1867 first elected in 1925 as Liberal member for Bruce South, Ontario.
- William Samuel Hall b. 1871 first elected in 1935 as Social Credit member for Edmonton East, Alberta.
- Martha Hall Findlay b. 1959 first elected in 2008 as Liberal member for Willowdale, Ontario.
- Howard Hadden Halladay b. 1878 first elected in 1917 as Unionist member for Bow River, Alberta.
- Jasraj Singh Hallan first elected in 2019 as Conservative member for Calgary Forest Lawn, Alberta.
- Maurice Hallé b. 1906 first elected in 1940 as Liberal member for Brome—Missisquoi, Quebec.
- Bruce Halliday b. 1926 first elected in 1974 as Progressive Conservative member for Oxford, Ontario.
- James Halliday b. 1845 first elected in 1901 as Conservative member for Bruce North, Ontario.
- Ernest Halpenny b. 1903 first elected in 1957 as Progressive Conservative member for London, Ontario.

== Ham–Han ==
- Joseph-Irénée-René Hamel b. 1910 first elected in 1945 as Bloc populaire canadien member for St-Maurice—Laflèche, Quebec.
- Charles-André Hamelin b. 1947 first elected in 1984 as Progressive Conservative member for Charlevoix, Quebec.
- Charles James Hamilton b. 1855 first elected in 1925 as Conservative member for Stormont, Ontario.
- Francis Alvin George Hamilton b. 1912 first elected in 1957 as Progressive Conservative member for Qu'Appelle, Saskatchewan.
- Frank Fletcher Hamilton b. 1921 first elected in 1972 as Progressive Conservative member for Swift Current—Maple Creek, Saskatchewan.
- Henry Sidney Hamilton b. 1897 first elected in 1935 as Liberal member for Algoma West, Ontario.
- John Borden Hamilton b. 1913 first elected in 1954 as Progressive Conservative member for York West, Ontario.
- William McLean Hamilton b. 1919 first elected in 1953 as Progressive Conservative member for Notre-Dame-de-Grâce, Quebec.
- William James Hammell b. 1881 first elected in 1921 as Progressive member for Muskoka, Ontario.
- Robert Leith Hanbidge b. 1891 first elected in 1958 as Progressive Conservative member for Kindersley, Saskatchewan.
- Wilfred Hanbury b. 1887 first elected in 1930 as Liberal member for Vancouver—Burrard, British Columbia.
- Art Hanger b. 1943 first elected in 1993 as Reform member for Calgary Northeast, Alberta.
- Brendan Hanley first elected in 2021 as Liberal member for Yukon, Yukon.
- Adelbert Edward Hanna b. 1863 first elected in 1913 as Conservative member for Lanark South, Ontario.
- Charles Edward Hanna b. 1884 first elected in 1924 as Liberal member for Hastings West, Ontario.
- Richmond Francis Hanna b. 1913 first elected in 1953 as Liberal member for Edmonton—Strathcona, Alberta.
- Hannes Marino Hannesson b. 1884 first elected in 1925 as Conservative member for Selkirk, Manitoba.
- Hugh Hanrahan b. 1947 first elected in 1993 as Reform member for Edmonton—Strathcona, Alberta.
- Ernest George Hansell b. 1895 first elected in 1935 as Social Credit member for Macleod, Alberta.
- Olof Hanson b. 1882 first elected in 1930 as Liberal member for Skeena, British Columbia.
- Richard Hanson b. 1879 first elected in 1921 as Conservative member for York—Sunbury, New Brunswick.

== Harb–Harq ==
- Mac Harb b. 1953 first elected in 1988 as Liberal member for Ottawa Centre, Ontario.
- Cheryl Hardcastle b. 1961 first elected as New Democratic Party member for Windsor—Tecumseh, Ontario.
- Rachael Harder b. 1986 first elected as Conservative member for Lethbridge, Alberta.
- Elliott William Hardey b. 1932 first elected in 1984 as Progressive Conservative member for Kent, Ontario.
- Isabel Hardie b. 1916 first elected in 1962 as Liberal member for Northwest Territories, Northwest Territories.
- Ken Hardie b. 1942 first elected in 2015 as Liberal member for Fleetwood—Port Kells, British Columbia.
- Mervyn Arthur Hardie b. 1918 first elected in 1953 as Liberal member for Mackenzie River, Northwest Territories.
- Randolph Harding b. 1914 first elected in 1968 as New Democratic Party member for Kootenay West, British Columbia.
- Gabriel Hardy first elected in 2025 as Conservative member for Montmorency—Charlevoix, Quebec.
- Louise Hardy b. 1959 first elected in 1997 as New Democratic Party member for Yukon, Yukon.
- Jack Hare b. 1920 first elected in 1978 as Progressive Conservative member for St. Boniface, Manitoba.
- John Hargraft b. 1865 first elected in 1891 as Liberal member for Northumberland West, Ontario.
- Herbert Thomas Hargrave b. 1917 first elected in 1972 as Progressive Conservative member for Medicine Hat, Alberta.
- Douglas Scott Harkness b. 1903 first elected in 1945 as Progressive Conservative member replaying Calgary East, Alberta.
- Archibald Harley b. 1824 first elected in 1882 as Liberal member for Oxford South, Ontario.
- Harry Cruickshank Harley b. 1926 first elected in 1962 as Liberal member for Halton, Ontario.
- John Paul Harney b. 1931 first elected in 1972 as New Democratic Party member for Scarborough West, Ontario.
- John Harold b. 1873 first elected in 1917 as Unionist member for Brant, Ontario.
- Ed Harper b. 1931 first elected in 1993 as Reform member for Simcoe Centre, Ontario.
- Elijah Harper b. 1949 first elected in 1993 as Liberal member for Churchill, Manitoba.
- Louis George Harper b. 1830 first elected in 1874 as Conservative member for Gaspé, Quebec.
- Stephen Harper b. 1959 first elected in 1993 as Reform member for Calgary West, Alberta.
- Maurice Harquail b. 1938 first elected in 1975 as Liberal member for Restigouche, New Brunswick.

== Harr–Harw ==
- Hu Harries b. 1921 first elected in 1968 as Liberal member for Edmonton—Strathcona, Alberta.
- Dan Harris b. 1979 first elected in 2011 as New Democratic Party member for Scarborough Southwest, Ontario.
- Jack Harris b. 1948 first elected in 1987 as New Democratic Party member for St. John's East, Newfoundland and Labrador.
- Joseph Henry Harris b. 1888 first elected in 1921 as Conservative member for York East, Ontario.
- Lloyd Harris b. 1867 first elected in 1908 as Liberal member for Brantford, Ontario.
- Richard M. Harris b. 1944 first elected in 1993 as Reform member for Prince George—Bulkley Valley, British Columbia.
- Walter Edward Harris b. 1904 first elected in 1940 as Liberal member for Grey—Bruce, Ontario.
- Charles Robert Harrison b. 1868 first elected in 1917 as Unionist member for Nipissing, Ontario.
- Emma Harrison first elected in 2025 as Liberal member for Peterborough, Ontario.
- Jeremy Harrison b. 1978 first elected in 2004 as Conservative member for Churchill River, Saskatchewan.
- John Hornby Harrison b. 1908 first elected in 1949 as Liberal member for Meadow Lake, Saskatchewan.
- Robert Alexander Harrison b. 1833 first elected in 1867 as Conservative member for West Toronto, Ontario.
- James Hart b. 1955 first elected in 1993 as Reform member for Okanagan—Similkameen—Merritt, British Columbia.
- David James Hartigan b. 1887 first elected in 1935 as Liberal member for Cape Breton South, Nova Scotia.
- Maurice Hartt b. 1895 first elected in 1947 as Liberal member for Cartier, Quebec.
- Thomas Aaron Hartt b. 1858 first elected in 1911 as Conservative member for Charlotte, New Brunswick.
- William Harty b. 1847 first elected in 1902 as Liberal member for Kingston, Ontario.
- John Harvard b. 1938 first elected in 1988 as Liberal member for Winnipeg—St. James, Manitoba.
- André Harvey b. 1941 first elected in 1984 as Progressive Conservative member for Chicoutimi, Quebec.
- Luc Harvey b. 1964 first elected in 2006 as Conservative member for Louis-Hébert, Quebec.
- Ross Harvey b. 1952 first elected in 1988 as New Democratic Party member for Edmonton East, Alberta.
- T. J. Harvey b. 1982 first elected in 2015 as Liberal member for Tobique—Mactaquac, New Brunswick.
- William Harvey b. 1821 first elected in 1872 as Liberal member for Elgin East, Ontario.
- Henry Stanislas Harwood b. 1838 first elected in 1891 as Liberal member for Vaudreuil, Quebec.
- Robert William Harwood b. 1826 first elected in 1872 as Liberal-Conservative member for Vaudreuil, Quebec.

== Has–Haz ==
- Andrew Haslam b. 1846 first elected in 1893 as Conservative member for Vancouver, British Columbia.
- Sana Hassainia b. 1974 first elected in 2011 as New Democratic Party member for Verchères—Les Patriotes, Quebec.
- Horace Haszard b. 1853 first elected in 1904 as Liberal snatched for West Queen's, Prince Edward Island.
- Heber Harold Hatfield b. 1885 first elected in 1940 as National Government member for Victoria—Carleton, New Brunswick.
- Paul Lacombe Hatfield b. 1873 first elected in 1921 as Liberal member for Yarmouth and Clare, Nova Scotia.
- Frederick James Hawkes b. 1934 first elected in 1979 as Progressive Conservative member for Calgary West, Alberta.
- John Joseph Hawkins b. 1840 first elected in 1882 as Liberal-Conservative member for Bothwell, Ontario.
- Laurie Hawn b. 1947 first elected in 2006 as Conservative member for Edmonton Centre, Alberta.
- Francis Wellington Hay b. 1864 first elected in 1926 as Liberal member for Perth North, Ontario.
- Robert Hay b. 1808 first elected in 1878 as Liberal member for Toronto Centre, Ontario.
- Thomas Hay b. 1872 first elected in 1917 as Unionist member for Selkirk, Manitoba.
- Bryan Hayes b. 1958 first elected in 2011 as Conservative member for Sault Ste. Marie, Ontario.
- Sharon Ruth Hayes b. 1948 first elected in 1993 as Reform member for Port Moody—Coquitlam, British Columbia.
- William Hayhurst b. 1887 first elected in 1935 as Social Credit member for Vegreville, Alberta.
- Harry Hays b. 1909 first elected in 1963 as Liberal member for Calgary South, Alberta.
- King Hazen b. 1885 first elected in 1940 as National Government member for St. John—Albert, New Brunswick.
- John Douglas Hazen b. 1860 first elected in 1891 as Conservative member for City and County of St. John, New Brunswick.

== He ==
- Albert Frederick Healy b. 1873 first elected in 1923 as Liberal member for Essex North, Ontario.
- Thomas Patrick Healy b. 1894 first elected in 1940 as Liberal member for St. Ann, Quebec.
- Dan Heap b. 1925 first elected in 1981 as New Democratic Party member for Spadina, Ontario.
- Abraham Albert Heaps b. 1885 first elected in 1925 as Labour Party member for Winnipeg North, Manitoba.
- John Hearn b. 1827 first elected in 1892 as Conservative member for Quebec West, Quebec.
- Loyola Hearn b. 1943 first elected in 2000 as Progressive Conservative member for St. John's West, Newfoundland and Labrador.
- Edmund Heath b. 1813 first elected in 1867 as Conservative member for Pontiac, Quebec.
- Richard Hébert first elected in 2017 as Liberal member for Lac-Saint-Jean, Quebec.
- Peter Heenan b. 1875 first elected in 1925 as Liberal member for Kenora—Rainy River, Ontario.
- George Hees b. 1910 first elected in 1950 as Progressive Conservative member for Broadview, Ontario.
- Kent Hehr b. 1969 first elected in 2015 as Liberal member for Calgary Centre, Alberta.
- Paul Hellyer b. 1923 first elected in 1949 as Liberal member for Davenport, Ontario.
- Francis Heselton Helme b. 1899 first elected in 1949 as Liberal member for Prince Albert, Saskatchewan.
- Richard Coe Henders b. 1853 first elected in 1917 as Unionist member for Macdonald, Manitoba.
- Charles Albert Henderson b. 1883 first elected in 1940 as Liberal member for Kindersley, Saskatchewan.
- David Henderson b. 1841 first elected in 1888 as Conservative member for Halton, Ontario.
- George Roland Henderson b. 1935 first elected in 1980 as Liberal member for Egmont, Prince Edward Island.
- Robert James Henderson b. 1877 first elected in 1945 as Progressive Conservative member for Lambton—Kent, Ontario.
- Walter Clarence Henderson b. 1891 first elected in 1958 as Progressive Conservative member scatter Cariboo, British Columbia.
- William James Henderson b. 1916 first elected in 1949 as Liberal member for Kingston City, Ontario.
- Charles Henry b. 1911 first elected in 1949 as Liberal member for Rosedale, Ontario.
- Robert Henry b. 1845 first elected in 1896 as Conservative member for Brant South, Ontario.
- Georges-Henri Héon b. 1902 first elected in 1938 as Independent Conservative member for Argenteuil, Quebec.
- Bernard Rickart Hepburn b. 1876 first elected in 1911 as Conservative member trusts Prince Edward, Ontario.
- Mitchell Hepburn b. 1896 first elected in 1926 as Liberal member for Elgin West, Ontario.
- Lisa Hepfner b. 1971 first elected in 2021 as Liberal member for Hamilton Mountain, Ontario.
- Harold Thomas Herbert b. 1922 first elected in 1972 as Liberal member for Vaudreuil, Quebec.
- Elwin Hermanson b. 1952 first elected in 1993 as Reform member for Kindersley—Lloydminster, Saskatchewan.
- Herbert Wilfred Herridge b. 1895 first elected in 1945 as Independent Cooperative Commonwealth Federation member for Kootenay West, British Columbia.
- John Herron b. 1853 first elected in 1904 as Liberal-Conservative member for Provisional District of Alberta, Northwest Territories.
- John Herron b. 1964 first elected in 1997 as Progressive Conservative member for Fundy—Royal, New Brunswick.
- Céline Hervieux-Payette b. 1941 first elected in 1979 as Liberal member for Mercier, Quebec.
- Samuel Rollin Hesson b. 1829 first elected in 1878 as Conservative member for Perth North, Ontario.
- Joseph Ingolph Hetland b. 1896 first elected in 1949 as Liberal member for Humboldt, Saskatchewan.
- Charles Bernhard Heyd b. 1842 first elected in 1897 as Liberal member for Brant South, Ontario.

== Hi ==
- Charles Erastus Hickey b. 1840 first elected in 1882 as Conservative member for Dundas, Ontario.
- Bonnie Hickey b. 1955 first elected in 1993 as Liberal member for St. John's East, Newfoundland and Labrador.
- Robert Nelson David Hicks b. 1933 first elected in 1984 as Progressive Conservative member for Scarborough East, Ontario.
- William Harold Hicks b. 1888 first elected in 1958 as Progressive Conservative member for Fraser Valley, British Columbia.
- Russ Hiebert b. 1969 first elected in 2004 as Conservative member for South Surrey—White Rock—Cloverdale, British Columbia.
- Gordon Higgins b. 1905 first elected in 1949 as Progressive Conservative member for St. John's East, Newfoundland and Labrador.
- Nathaniel Higinbotham b. 1830 first elected in 1872 as Liberal member for Wellington North, Ontario.
- Ken Higson b. 1934 first elected in 1972 as Progressive Conservative member for Lincoln, Ontario.
- Burton Hill b. 1883 first elected in 1935 as Liberal member for Charlotte, New Brunswick.
- Grant Hill b. 1943 first elected in 1993 as Reform member for Macleod, Alberta.
- Jay Hill b. 1952 first elected in 1993 as Reform member for Prince George—Peace River, British Columbia.
- George Hilliard b. 1827 first elected in 1878 as Liberal-Conservative member for Peterborough West, Ontario.
- Jim Hillyer b. 1974 first elected in 2011 as Conservative member for Lethbridge, Alberta.
- Howard Hilstrom b. 1947 first elected in 1997 as Reform member for Selkirk—Interlake, Manitoba.
- Francis Hincks b. 1807 first elected in 1869 as Liberal-Conservative member for Renfrew North, Ontario.
- Betty Hinton b. 1950 first elected in 2000 as Canadian Alliance member for Kamloops, Thompson and Highland Valleys, British Columbia.
- Alana Hirtle first elected in 2025 as Liberal member for Cumberland—Colchester, Nova Scotia

== Hl ==
- Anthony Hlynka b. 1907 first elected in 1940 as Social Credit member for Vegreville, Alberta.

== Hn ==
- Ray Hnatyshyn b. 1934 first elected in 1974 as Progressive Conservative member for Saskatoon—Biggar, Saskatchewan.

== Ho ==
- Vincent Ho first elected in 2025 as Conservative member for Richmond Hill South, Ontario.

== Hob–Hom ==
- Randy Hoback b. 1967 first elected in 2008 as Conservative member for Prince Albert, Saskatchewan.
- Frederick George Hoblitzell b. 1891 first elected in 1940 as Liberal member for Eglinton, Ontario.
- Horatio Clarence Hocken b. 1857 first elected in 1917 as Unionist member for Toronto West, Ontario.
- Thomas Hockin b. 1938 first elected in 1984 as Progressive Conservative member for London West, Ontario.
- Adam King Hodgins b. 1859 first elected in 1925 as Conservative member for Middlesex East, Ontario.
- Archie Latimer Hodgins b. 1876 first elected in 1921 as Progressive member for Middlesex East, Ontario.
- George Frederick Hodgins b. 1865 first elected in 1908 as Liberal member for Pontiac, Quebec.
- William Thomas Hodgins b. 1857 first elected in 1891 as Conservative member for Carleton, Ontario.
- Clayton Wesley Hodgson b. 1897 first elected in 1945 as Progressive Conservative member for Victoria, Ontario.
- Tim Hodgson first elected in 2025 as Liberal member for Markham—Thornhill, Ontario.
- Jake Hoeppner b. 1936 first elected in 1993 as Reform member for Lisgar—Marquette, Manitoba.
- Robert Alexander Hoey b. 1883 first elected in 1921 as Progressive member for Springfield, Manitoba.
- Andrew Hogan b. 1923 first elected in 1974 as New Democratic Party member for Cape Breton—East Richmond, Nova Scotia.
- Corey Hogan first elected in 2025 as Liberal member for Calgary Confederation, Alberta.
- Douglas Hogarth b. 1927 first elected in 1968 as Liberal member for New Westminster, British Columbia.
- Gordie Hogg b. 1946 first elected in 2017 as Liberal member for South Surrey—White Rock, British Columbia.
- Jean-Pierre Hogue b. 1927 first elected in 1988 as Progressive Conservative member for Outremont, Quebec.
- Ed Holder b. 1954 first elected in 2008 as Conservative member for London West, Ontario.
- Mark Holland b. 1974 first elected in 2004 as Liberal member for Ajax—Pickering, Ontario.
- Daniel Hollands b. 1927 first elected in 1972 as Progressive Conservative member for Pembina, Alberta.
- Allan Henry Hollingworth b. 1918 first elected in 1953 as Liberal member for York Centre, Ontario.
- Kurt Holman first elected in 2025 as Conservative member for London—Fanshawe, Ontario.
- John Holmes b. 1828 first elected in 1867 as Liberal-Conservative member for Carleton, Ontario.
- John Robert Holmes b. 1927 first elected in 1972 as Progressive Conservative member for Lambton—Kent, Ontario.
- Robert Holmes b. 1852 first elected in 1899 as Liberal member for Huron West, Ontario.
- Ambrose Holowach b. 1914 first elected in 1953 as Social Credit member for Edmonton East, Alberta.
- Simma Holt b. 1922 first elected in 1974 as Liberal member for Vancouver Kingsway, British Columbia.
- Felix Holtmann b. 1944 first elected in 1984 as Progressive Conservative member for Selkirk—Interlake, Manitoba.
- Edward Holton b. 1844 first elected in 1880 as Liberal member for Châteauguay, Quebec.
- Luther Hamilton Holton b. 1817 first elected in 1867 as Liberal member for Châteauguay, Quebec.
- Joshua Attwood Reynolds Homer b. 1827 first elected in 1882 as Liberal-Conservative member for New Westminster, British Columbia.
- Karl Kenneth Homuth b. 1893 first elected in 1938 as Conservative member for Waterloo South, Ontario.

== Hon–How ==
- Russell Honey b. 1921 first elected in 1962 as Liberal member for Durham, Ontario.
- Edmund John Glyn Hooper b. 1818 first elected in 1878 as Liberal-Conservative member for Lennox, Ontario.
- Edward Nicholas Hopkins b. 1855 first elected in 1923 as Progressive member for Moose Jaw, Saskatchewan.
- Leonard Donald Hopkins b. 1930 first elected in 1965 as Liberal member for Renfrew North, Ontario.
- Albert Ralph Horner b. 1913 first elected in 1958 as Progressive Conservative member for The Battlefords, Saskatchewan.
- Hugh Horner b. 1925 first elected in 1958 as Progressive Conservative member for Jasper—Edson, Alberta.
- John H. "Jack" Horner b. 1927 first elected in 1958 as Progressive Conservative member for Acadia, Alberta.
- Norval Alic Horner b. 1930 first elected in 1972 as Progressive Conservative member for Battleford—Kindersley, Saskatchewan.
- Robert Nesbitt Horner b. 1932 first elected in 1984 as Progressive Conservative member for Mississauga North, Ontario.
- Edward Allan Horning b. 1939 first elected in 1988 as Progressive Conservative member for Okanagan Centre, British Columbia.
- Edward Henry Horsey b. 1867 first elected in 1900 as Liberal member for Grey North, Ontario.
- Horace Horton b. 1823 first elected in 1872 as Liberal member for Huron Centre, Ontario.
- Henry Alfred Hosking b. 1908 first elected in 1949 as Liberal member for Wellington South, Ontario.
- William Houck b. 1893 first elected in 1953 as Liberal member for Niagara Falls, Ontario.
- Camillien Houde b. 1889 first elected in 1949 as Independent member for Papineau, Quebec.
- Frédéric Houde b. 1847 first elected in 1878 as Nationalist member for Maskinongé, Quebec.
- Charles Frederick Houghton b. 1839 first elected in 1871 as Liberal member for Yale District, British Columbia.
- Anthony Housefather b. 1973 first elected in 2015 as Liberal member for Mount Royal, Quebec.
- Stan Hovdebo b. 1925 first elected in 1979 as New Democratic Party member for Prince Albert, Saskatchewan.
- Bruce Howard b. 1922 first elected in 1968 as Liberal member for Okanagan Boundary, British Columbia.
- Charles Benjamin Howard b. 1885 first elected in 1925 as Liberal member for Sherbrooke, Quebec.
- Frank Howard b. 1925 first elected in 1957 as CCF member for Skeena, British Columbia.
- John Power Howden b. 1879 first elected in 1925 as Liberal member for St. Boniface, Manitoba.
- Clarence Decatur Howe b. 1886 first elected in 1935 as Liberal member for Port Arthur, Ontario.
- Joseph Howe b. 1804 first elected in 1867 as Anti-Confederate member for Hants, Nova Scotia.
- William Dean Howe b. 1916 first elected in 1963 as New Democratic Party member for Hamilton South, Ontario.
- William Marvin Howe b. 1906 first elected in 1953 as Progressive Conservative member for Wellington—Huron, Ontario.
- Robert Howie b. 1929 first elected in 1972 as Progressive Conservative member for York—Sunbury, New Brunswick.
- William Pearce Howland b. 1811 first elected in 1867 as Liberal-Conservative member for York West, Ontario.

== Hs ==
- Ted Hsu b. 1964 first elected in 2011 as Liberal member for Kingston and the Islands, Ontario.

== Hu ==
- Charles Hubbard b. 1940 first elected in 1993 as Liberal member for Miramichi, New Brunswick.
- John Hubbs b. 1874 first elected in 1921 as Conservative member for Prince Edward, Ontario.
- Stanley Hudecki b. 1916 first elected in 1980 as Liberal member for Hamilton West, Ontario.
- Jean-Guy Hudon b. 1941 first elected in 1984 as Progressive Conservative member for Beauharnois—Salaberry, Quebec.
- Albert Blellock Hudson b. 1875 first elected in 1921 as Liberal member for Winnipeg South, Manitoba.
- Adam Hudspeth b. 1836 first elected in 1887 as Conservative member for Victoria South, Ontario.
- Joseph Fred Hueglin b. 1937 first elected in 1972 as Progressive Conservative member for Niagara Falls, Ontario.
- Edward Blake Huffman b. 1902 first elected in 1949 as Liberal member for Kent, Ontario.
- Carol Hughes b. 1958 first elected in 2008 as New Democratic member for Algoma—Manitoulin—Kapuskasing, Ontario.
- James Joseph Hughes b. 1856 first elected in 1900 as Liberal member for King's, Prince Edward Island.
- Ken Hughes b. 1954 first elected in 1988 as Progressive Conservative member for Macleod, Alberta.
- Patrick Hughes b. 1831 first elected in 1878 as Liberal member for Niagara, Ontario.
- Sam Hughes b. 1853 first elected in 1892 as Liberal-Conservative member for Victoria North, Ontario.
- Levi William Humphrey b. 1881 first elected in 1921 as Progressive member for Kootenay West, British Columbia.
- Aylmer Byron Hunt b. 1864 first elected in 1904 as Liberal member for Compton, Quebec.
- John William Gordon Hunter b. 1909 first elected in 1949 as Liberal member for Parkdale, Ontario.
- Lynn Hunter b. 1947 first elected in 1988 as New Democratic Party member for Saanich—Gulf Islands, British Columbia.
- Arthur Ronald Huntington b. 1921 first elected in 1974 as Progressive Conservative member for Capilano, British Columbia.
- Lucius Seth Huntington b. 1827 first elected in 1867 as Liberal member for Shefford, Quebec.
- Pierre-Gabriel Huot b. 1831 first elected in 1867 as Liberal member for Quebec East, Quebec.
- Francis Hurdon b. 1834 first elected in 1867 as Conservative member for Bruce South, Ontario.
- Kenneth Earl Hurlburt b. 1928 first elected in 1972 as Progressive Conservative member for Lethbridge, Alberta.
- Jeremiah M. Hurley b. 1840 first elected in 1896 as Liberal member for Hastings East, Ontario.
- Hilaire Hurteau b. 1837 first elected in 1874 as Liberal-Conservative member for L'Assomption, Quebec.
- Raoul Hurtubise b. 1882 first elected in 1930 as Liberal member for Nipissing, Ontario.
- William James Hushion b. 1883 first elected in 1924 as Liberal member for St. Antoine, Quebec.
- Ahmed Hussen b. 1976 first elected in 2015 as Liberal member for York South—Weston, Ontario.
- Gudie Hutchings b. 1959 first elected in 2015 as Liberal member for Long Range Mountains, Newfoundland and Labrador.
- William Henry Hutchins b. 1843 first elected in 1891 as Conservative member for Middlesex North, Ontario.
- Richard Hutchison b. 1812 first elected in 1868 as Liberal member for Northumberland, New Brunswick.
- William H. Hutchison b. 1843 first elected in 1896 as Liberal member for City of Ottawa, Ontario.

== Hy ==
- Bruce Hyer b. 1946 first elected in 2008 as New Democratic member for Thunder Bay—Superior North, Ontario.
- Charles Smith Hyman b. 1854 first elected in 1891 as Liberal member for London, Ontario.
- Kieth Hymmen b. 1913 first elected in 1965 as Liberal member for Waterloo North, Ontario.
- Alonzo Hyndman b. 1890 first elected in 1935 as Conservative member for Carleton, Ontario.
