= By-elections to the 14th Canadian Parliament =

By-elections to the 14th Canadian Parliament were held to elect members of the House of Commons of Canada between the 1921 federal election and the 1925 federal election. The Liberal Party of Canada led the government, which fluctuated between a minority and majority, for the 14th Canadian Parliament.

The list includes Ministerial by-elections which occurred due to the requirement that Members of Parliament recontest their seats upon being appointed to Cabinet. These by-elections were almost always uncontested. This requirement was abolished in 1931.

By-election	Date	Incumbent	Party	Winner	Party	Cause	Retained
Témiscouata	December 1, 1924	Charles Arthur Gauvreau	Liberal	Jean-François Pouliot	Liberal	Death	Yes
Hastings West	November 25, 1924	Edward Guss Porter	Conservative	Charles Edward Hanna	Liberal	Resignation in protest at the James Murdock-Home Bank incident.,	No
Yale	November 6, 1924	John Armstrong MacKelvie	Conservative	Grote Stirling	Conservative	Death	Yes
Northumberland	October 7, 1924	John Morrissy	Liberal	William Bunting Snowball	Liberal	Death	Yes
Rimouski	September 2, 1924	Joseph-Émile-Stanislas-Émmanuel D'Anjou	Liberal	Eugène Fiset	Liberal	Appointed Registrar of Deeds for the County of Rimouski.	Yes
St. Antoine	September 2, 1924	Walter George Mitchell	Liberal	William James Hushion	Liberal	Resigned	Yes
Richelieu	February 27, 1924	Arthur Cardin	Liberal	Arthur Cardin	Liberal	Recontested upon appointment as Minister of Marine and Fisheries.	Yes
Kent	December 20, 1923	Auguste Théophile Léger	Liberal	Alexandre-Joseph Doucet	Conservative	Death	No
Halifax	December 5, 1923	Alexander Kenneth Maclean	Liberal	William Anderson Black	Conservative	Resignation.	No
Winnipeg North	October 24, 1923	Edward James McMurray	Liberal	Edward James McMurray	Liberal	Recontested upon appointment as Solicitor General of Canada.	Yes
Renfrew South	September 6, 1923	Thomas Andrew Low	Liberal	Thomas Andrew Low	Liberal	Recontested upon appointment as Minister of Trade and Commerce.	Yes
Pictou	September 6, 1923	Edward Mortimer Macdonald	Liberal	Edward Mortimer Macdonald	Liberal	Recontested upon appointment as Minister of National Defence.	Yes
North Cape Breton and Victoria	July 31, 1923	Daniel Duncan McKenzie	Liberal	Fenwick Lionel Kelly	Liberal	Appointed a judge of the Supreme Court of Nova Scotia	Yes
Nicolet	May 14, 1923	Arthur Trahan	Liberal	Joseph-Félix Descôteaux	Liberal	Appointed a judge of the Superior Court of Quebec	Yes
Moose Jaw	April 10, 1923	Robert Milton Johnson	Progressive	Edward Nicholas Hopkins	Progressive	Election declared void.	Yes
Essex North	March 1, 1923	William Costello Kennedy	Liberal	Albert Frederick Healy	Liberal	Death	Yes
Halifax	December 4, 1922	Edward Blackadder	Liberal	Robert Emmett Finn	Liberal	Death	Yes
Lanark	December 4, 1922	John Alexander Stewart	Conservative	Richard Franklin Preston	Conservative	Death	Yes
Jacques Cartier	November 20, 1922	David Arthur Lafortune	Liberal	Joseph-Théodule Rhéaume	Liberal	Death	Yes
Mégantic	November 20, 1922	Lucien Turcotte Pacaud	Liberal	Eusèbe Roberge	Liberal	Appointed Secretary to the Canadian High Commissioner to London.	Yes
Gloucester	November 20, 1922	Onésiphore Turgeon	Liberal	Jean George Robichaud	Liberal	Called to the Senate.	Yes
St. Johns—Iberville	August 31, 1922	Marie-Joseph Demers	Liberal	Aldéric-Joseph Benoit	Liberal	Resignation.	Yes
Kamouraska	May 15, 1922	Charles Adolphe Stein	Liberal	Joseph Georges Bouchard	Liberal	Appointed a judge of the Superior Court of Quebec.	Yes
Vaudreuil-Soulanges	March 21, 1922	Gustave Benjamin Boyer	Liberal	Joseph-Rodolphe Ouimet	Liberal	Called to the Senate.	Yes
Kootenay East	March 14, 1922	Robert Ethelbert Beattie	Liberal	James Horace King	Liberal	Resignation.	Yes
Argenteuil	February 28, 1922	Peter Robert McGibbon	Liberal	Charles Stewart	Liberal	Death	Yes
Grenville	January 26, 1922	Arza Clair Casselman	Conservative	Arthur Meighen	Conservative	Resignation to provide a seat for Meighen.	Yes
Regina	January 19, 1922	William Richard Motherwell	Liberal	William Richard Motherwell	Liberal	Recontested upon appointment as Minister of Agriculture .	Yes
Beauce	January 19, 1922	Henri Sévérin Béland	Liberal	Henri Sévérin Béland	Liberal	Recontested upon appointment as Minister of Soldiers' Civil Re-establishment.	Yes
Three Rivers and St. Maurice	January 19, 1922	Jacques Bureau	Liberal	Jacques Bureau	Liberal	Recontested upon appointment as Minister of Customs and Excise.	Yes
Westmorland	January 19, 1922	Arthur Bliss Copp	Liberal	Arthur Bliss Copp	Liberal	Recontested upon appointment as Secretary of State for Canada.	Yes
Shelburne and Queen's	January 19, 1922	William Stevens Fielding	Liberal	William Stevens Fielding	Liberal	Recontested upon appointment as Minister of Finance.	Yes
Laurier—Outremont	January 19, 1922	Lomer Gouin	Liberal	Lomer Gouin	Liberal	Recontested upon appointment as Minister of Justice.	Yes
Essex South	January 19, 1922	George Perry Graham	Liberal	George Perry Graham	Liberal	Recontested upon appointment as Minister of Militia and Defence and Minister of Naval Service.	Yes
Essex North	January 19, 1922	William Costello Kennedy	Liberal	William Costello Kennedy	Liberal	Recontested upon appointment as Minister of Railways and Canals.	Yes
York North	January 19, 1922	William Lyon Mackenzie King	Liberal	William Lyon Mackenzie King	Liberal	Recontested upon appointment as Prime Minister.	Yes
Quebec East	January 19, 1922	Ernest Lapointe	Liberal	Ernest Lapointe	Liberal	Recontested upon appointment as Minister of Marine and Fisheries .	Yes
North Cape Breton and Victoria	January 19, 1922	Daniel Duncan McKenzie	Liberal	Daniel Duncan McKenzie	Liberal	Recontested upon appointment as Solicitor General.	Yes
Kent	January 19, 1922	Archibald McCoig	Liberal	James Murdock	Liberal	Called to the Senate to provide a seat for Murdock	Yes
Russell	January 19, 1922	Charles Murphy	Liberal	Charles Murphy	Liberal	Recontested upon appointment as Postmaster General.	Yes
Châteauguay—Huntingdon	January 19, 1922	James Robb	Liberal	James Robb	Liberal	Recontested upon appointment as Minister of Trade and Commerce .	Yes

== See also ==
- List of federal by-elections in Canada
