= 14th Canadian Parliament =

1922–25 national legislative term

- Majority parliament
- Mar. 8, 1922 – Sep. 5, 1925

Parliament leaders
- Prime minister: William Lyon Mackenzie King; Dec. 29, 1921 – Jun. 28, 1926
- Cabinet: 12th Canadian Ministry
- Leader of the Opposition: Arthur Meighen; 29 December 1921 – 28 June 1926

Party caucuses
- Government: Liberal Party
- Opposition: Conservative Party*
- Crossbench: Progressive Party*
- Labour
- United Farmers
- * Arthur Meighen's Conservatives formed the Official Opposition although the Progressive Party had more seats.

House of Commons
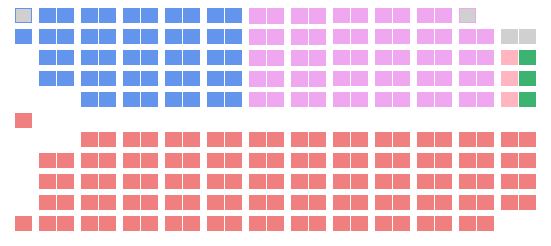
- Seating arrangements of the House of Commons
- Speaker of the Commons: Rodolphe Lemieux; 8 March 1922 – 2 June 1930

Senate
- Speaker of the Senate: Hewitt Bostock; 7 February 1922 – 12 May 1930
- Government Senate leader: Raoul Dandurand; 29 December 1921 – 28 June 1926
- Opposition Senate leader: James Alexander Lougheed; 28 December 1921 – 2 November 1925

Sovereign
- Monarch: George V 6 May 1910 – 20 January 1936
- Governor general: Julian Byng; 11 August 1921 – 2 October 1926

Sessions
- 1st session 8 March 1922 – 28 June 1922
- 2nd session 31 January 1923 – 30 June 1923
- 3rd session 28 February 1924 – 19 July 1924
- 4th session 5 February 1925 – 27 June 1925
← 13th	→ 15th

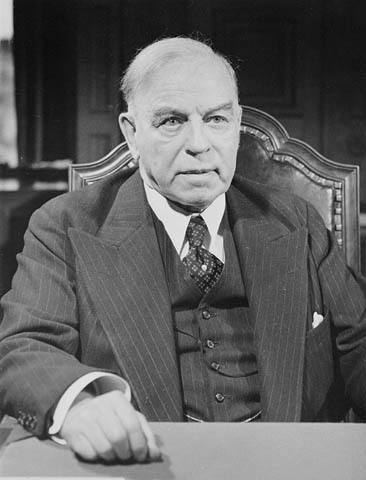
William Lyon Mackenzie King was Prime Minister during the 14th Canadian Parliament.

The 14th Canadian Parliament was in session from 8 March 1922 until 5 September 1925. The membership was set by the 1921 federal election on 6 December 1921, and it changed somewhat due to resignations and by-elections. It was dissolved on 5 September 1925, causing the 1925 election.

It was controlled by a Liberal Party government under Prime Minister William Lyon Mackenzie King and the 12th Canadian Ministry. The Official Opposition was the Conservative Party, led by Arthur Meighen, although the new Progressive Party led by Thomas Crerar had more seats. The appearance of the Progressive Party created a three-party system in the House for the first time since the 1867 Anti-Confederation Party.

The Speaker was Rodolphe Lemieux. See also List of Canadian electoral districts 1914-1924 for a list of the ridings in this parliament.

There were four sessions of the 14th Parliament:

Session	Start	End
1st	8 March 1922	28 June 1922
2nd	31 January 1923	30 June 1923
3rd	28 February 1924	19 July 1924
4th	5 February 1925	27 June 1925

== List of members ==
Following is a full list of members of the fourteenth Parliament listed first by province, then by electoral district.

Key:

- Party leaders are italicized.
- Parliamentary secretaries is indicated by "‡".
- Cabinet ministers are in **boldface**.
- The Prime Minister is **both**.
- The Speaker is indicated by "(†)".

Electoral districts denoted by an asterisk (*) indicates that district was represented by two members.

=== Alberta ===
Electoral district	Name	Party	First elected/previously elected	No. of terms
Battle River	Henry Elvins Spencer	Progressive	1921	1st term
Bow River	Edward Joseph Garland	Progressive	1921	1st term
Calgary West	Joseph Tweed Shaw	Labour	1921	1st term
East Calgary	William Irvine	Labour	1921	1st term
Edmonton East	Donald Ferdinand Kellner	Progressive	1921	1st term
Edmonton West	Donald MacBeth Kennedy	Progressive	1921	1st term
Lethbridge	Lincoln Henry Jelliff	Progressive	1921	1st term
Macleod	George Gibson Coote	Progressive	1921	1st term
Medicine Hat	Robert Gardiner	Progressive	1921	2nd term
Red Deer	Alfred Speakman	United Farmers of Alberta	1921	1st term
Strathcona	Daniel Webster Warner	Progressive	1921	1st term
Victoria	William Thomas Lucas	United Farmers of Alberta	1921	1st term

=== British Columbia ===
Electoral district	Name	Party	First elected/previously elected	No. of terms
Burrard	John Arthur Clark	Conservative	1921	1st term
Cariboo	Thomas George McBride	Progressive	1921	1st term
Comox—Alberni	Alan Webster Neill	Progressive	1921	1st term
Fraser Valley	Elgin Albert Munro	Liberal	1921	1st term
Kootenay East	Robert Ethelbert Beattie (until 8 February 1922 appointment)	Liberal	1921	1st term
Kootenay East	**James Horace King** (by-election of 14 March 1922)	Liberal	1922	1st term
Kootenay West	Levi William Humphrey	Progressive	1921	1st term
Nanaimo	Charles Herbert Dickie	Conservative	1921	1st term
New Westminster	William Garland McQuarrie	Conservative	1917	2nd term
Skeena	Alfred Stork	Liberal	1921	1st term
Vancouver Centre	Henry Herbert Stevens	Conservative	1911	3rd term
Vancouver South	Leon Johnson Ladner	Conservative	1921	1st term
Victoria City	Simon Fraser Tolmie	Conservative	1917	2nd term
Yale	John Armstrong Mackelvie (died 6 April 1924)	Conservative	1920	2nd term
Yale	Grote Stirling (by-election of 6 November 1924)	Conservative	1924	1st term

=== Manitoba ===
Electoral district	Name	Party	First elected/previously elected	No. of terms
Brandon	Robert Forke	Progressive	1921	1st term
Dauphin	William John Ward	Progressive	1921	1st term
Lisgar	John Livingstone Brown	Progressive	1921	1st term
Macdonald	William James Lovie	Progressive	1921	1st term
Marquette	Thomas Crerar	Progressive	1917 (Note: First elected as a Unionist)	2nd term
Neepawa	Robert Milne	Progressive	1921	1st term
Nelson	Thomas William Bird	Progressive	1921	1st term
Portage la Prairie	Harry Leader	Progressive	1921	1st term
Provencher	Arthur-Lucien Beaubien	Progressive	1921	1st term
Selkirk	Leland Payson Bancroft	Progressive	1921	1st term
Souris	James Steedsman	Progressive	1921	1st term
Springfield	Robert Alexander Hoey	Progressive	1921	1st term
Winnipeg Centre	James Shaver Woodsworth	Labour	1921	1st term
Winnipeg North	**Edward James McMurray** (until emoulment appointment)	Liberal	1921	1st term
Winnipeg North	**Edward James McMurray** (by-election of 24 October 1923)	Liberal	1921	1st term
Winnipeg South	Albert Hudson	Independent Liberal	1921	1st term

=== New Brunswick ===
Electoral district	Name	Party	First elected/previously elected	No. of terms
Charlotte	Robert Watson Grimmer	Conservative	1921	1st term
Gloucester	Onésiphore Turgeon (until 26 October 1922 emoulment appointment)	Liberal	1900	6th term
Gloucester	Jean George Robichaud (by-election of 20 November 1922)	Liberal	1922	1st term
Kent	Auguste Théophile Léger	Liberal	1917	2nd term
Kent	Alexandre-Joseph Doucet (by-election of 20 December 1923)	Conservative	1923	1st term
Northumberland	John Morrissy (died 31 July 1924)	Liberal	1921	1st term
Northumberland	William Bunting Snowball (by-election of 7 October 1924)	Liberal	1924	1st term
Restigouche—Madawaska	Pius Michaud	Liberal	1907	5th term
Royal	George Burpee Jones	Conservative	1921	1st term
St. John—Albert*	John Babington Macaulay Baxter	Conservative	1921	1st term
St. John—Albert*	Murray Maclaren	Conservative	1921	1st term
Victoria—Carleton	Thomas Wakem Caldwell	Progressive	1919 (Note: First elected as a United Farmers)	2nd term
Westmorland	**Arthur Bliss Copp** (until appointed Secretary of State)	Liberal	1915	3rd term
Westmorland	**Arthur Bliss Copp** (by-election of 19 January 1922)	Liberal	1915	3rd term
York—Sunbury	Richard Hanson	Conservative	1921	2nd term

=== Nova Scotia ===
Electoral district	Name	Party	First elected/previously elected	No. of terms
Antigonish—Guysborough	Colin Francis McIsaac	Liberal	1895, 1921	5th term*
Cape Breton South and Richmond*	William F. Carroll	Liberal	1911, 1921	2nd term*
Cape Breton South and Richmond*	George William Kyte	Liberal	1908, 1921	3rd term*
Colchester	Harold Putnam	Liberal	1921	1st term
Cumberland	Hance James Logan	Liberal	1896, 1921	4th term*
Digby and Annapolis	Lewis Johnstone Lovett	Liberal	1921	1st term
Halifax*	Edward Blackadder (died 22 October 1922)	Liberal	1921	1st term
Halifax*	Alexander Kenneth Maclean (until 2 November 1923 emoulment appointment)	Liberal	1904	5th term
Halifax*	Robert Emmett Finn (by-election of 4 December 1922, replaces Blackadder)	Liberal	1922	1st term
Halifax*	William Anderson Black (by-election of 5 December 1923, replaces Maclean)	Conservative	1923	1st term
Hants	Lewis Herbert Martell	Liberal	1921	1st term
Inverness	Alexander William Chisholm	Liberal	1908	4th term
Kings	Ernest William Robinson	Liberal	1921	1st term
Lunenburg	William Duff	Liberal	1917	2nd term
North Cape Breton and Victoria	**Daniel Duncan McKenzie** (until 29 December 1921 emoulment appointment)	Liberal	1904, 1908	5th term*
North Cape Breton and Victoria	**Daniel Duncan McKenzie** (by-election of 19 January 1922, until 11 April 1923 emoulment appointment)	Liberal	1904, 1908	5th term*
North Cape Breton and Victoria	Fenwick Lionel Kelly (by-election of 31 January 1923)	Liberal	1923	1st term
Pictou	**Edward Mortimer Macdonald** (until 15 August 1923 emoulment appointment)	Liberal	1904, 1921	4th term*
Pictou	**Edward Mortimer Macdonald** (by-election of 6 September 1923)	Liberal	1904, 1921	4th term*
Shelburne and Queen's	**William Stevens Fielding** (until 29 December 1921 emoulment appointment)	Liberal	1896, 1917	6th term*
Shelburne and Queen's	**William Stevens Fielding** (by-election of 19 January 1922)	Liberal	1896, 1917	6th term*
Yarmouth and Clare	Paul Lacombe Hatfield	Liberal	1921	1st term

=== Ontario ===
Electoral district	Name	Party	First elected/previously elected	No. of terms
Algoma East	John Carruthers	Liberal	1921	1st term
Algoma West	Thomas Edward Simpson	Conservative	1917	2nd term
Brantford	William Gawtress Raymond	Liberal	1921	1st term
Brant	William Charles Good	Independent Progressive	1921	1st term
Bruce North	James Malcolm	Liberal	1921	1st term
Bruce South	John Walter Findlay	Progressive	1921	1st term
Carleton	William Foster Garland	Conservative	1912, 1921	2nd term*
Dufferin	Robert John Woods	Progressive	1921	1st term
Dundas	Preston Elliott	Progressive	1921	1st term
Durham	Fred Wellington Bowen	Conservative	1921	1st term
Elgin East	John Lawrence Stansell	Conservative	1921	1st term
Elgin West	Hugh Cummings McKillop	Conservative	1921	1st term
Essex North	**William Costello Kennedy** (until 29 December 1921 ministerial appointment)	Liberal	1917	2nd term
Essex North	**William Costello Kennedy** (by-election of 19 January 1922, died 17 January 1923)	Liberal	1917	2nd term
Essex North	Albert Frederick Healy (by-election of 1 March 1923)	Liberal	1921	1st term
Essex South	**George Perry Graham** (until 29 December 1921 ministerial appointment)	Liberal	1907, (Note: Brockville) 1912, (Note: Renfrew South) 1921	4th term*
Essex South	**George Perry Graham** (by-election of 19 January 1922)	Liberal	1907, 1912, 1921	4th term*
Fort William and Rainy River	Robert James Manion	Conservative	1917	2nd term
Frontenac	William Samuel Reed	Progressive	1921	1st term
Glengarry and Stormont	John Wilfred Kennedy	Progressive	1919	2nd term
Grenville	Arza Clair Casselman (until 27 December 1921 emoulment appointment)	Conservative	1921	1st term
Grenville	Arthur Meighen (by-election of 26 January 1922)	Conservative	1908, (Note: Portage la Prairie (Manitoba)) 1922	4th term*
Grey North	Matthew Robert Duncan	Conservative	1921	1st term
Grey Southeast	Agnes Macphail	Progressive	1921	1st term
Haldimand	Mark Cecil Senn	Conservative	1921	1st term
Halton	Robert King Anderson	Conservative	1917	2nd term
Hamilton East	Sydney Chilton Mewburn	Conservative	1917	2nd term
Hamilton West	Thomas Joseph Stewart	Conservative	1900	6th term
Hastings East	Thomas Henry Thompson	Conservative	1917	2nd term
Hastings West	Edward Guss Porter (resigned 27 June 1924)	Conservative	1902	6th term
Hastings West	Charles Edward Hanna (by-election of 25 November 1924)	Liberal	1924	1st term
Huron North	John Warwick King	Progressive	1921	1st term
Huron South	William Black	Progressive	1921	1st term
Kent	Archibald Blake McCoig (until 4 January 1922 Senate appointment)	Liberal	1908	4th term
Kent	**James Murdock** (by-election of 19 January 1922)	Liberal	1922	1st term
Kingston	Arthur Edward Ross	Conservative	1921	1st term
Lambton East	Burt Wendell Fansher	Progressive	1921	1st term
Lambton West	Richard Vryling Lesueur	Conservative	1921	1st term
Lanark	John Alexander Stewart (died 7 October 1922)	Conservative	1918	2nd term
Lanark	Richard Franklin Preston (by-election of 4 December 1922)	Conservative	1922	1st term
Leeds	Hugh Alexander Stewart	Conservative	1921	1st term
Lennox and Addington	Edward James Sexsmith	Progressive	1921	1st term
Lincoln	James Dew Chaplin	Conservative	1917	2nd term
London	John Franklin White	Conservative	1921	1st term
Middlesex East	Archie Latimer Hodgins	Progressive	1921	1st term
Middlesex West	John Douglas Fraser Drummond	Progressive	1921	1st term
Muskoka	William James Hammell	Progressive	1921	1st term
Nipissing	Edmond Lapierre	Liberal	1921	1st term
Norfolk	John Alexander Wallace	Progressive	1921	1st term
Northumberland	Milton Edgar Maybee	Conservative	1921	1st term
Ontario North	Robert Henry Halbert	United Farmers of Ontario	1919	2nd term
Ontario South	Lawson Omar Clifford	Liberal	1887, 1892, 1911	8th term*
Ottawa (City of)*	Edgar-Rodolphe-Eugène Chevrier	Liberal	1921	1st term
Ottawa (City of)*	**Harold Buchanan McGiverin**	Liberal	1908, 1921	2nd term*
Oxford North	Duncan James Sinclair	Liberal	1921	1st term
Oxford South	Donald Sutherland	Conservative	1911	3rd term
Parkdale	David Spence	Conservative	1921	1st term
Parry Sound	James Arthurs	Conservative	1908	4th term
Peel	Samuel Charters	Conservative	1917	2nd term
Perth North	James Palmer Rankin	Liberal	1921	1st term
Perth South	William Forrester	Liberal	1921	1st term
Peterborough East	George Arthur Brethen	Progressive	1921	1st term
Peterborough West	**George Newcombe Gordon**	Liberal	1921	2nd term
Port Arthur and Kenora	Dougald Kennedy	Progressive	1921	1st term
Prescott	Joseph Binette	Progressive	1921	1st term
Prescott	Joseph Binette	Liberal	1921	1st term
Prince Edward	John Hubbs	Conservative	1921	1st term
Renfrew North	Matthew McKay	Liberal	1921	1st term
Renfrew South	**Thomas Andrew Low** (until emoulment appointment)	Liberal	1908, 1921	3rd term*
Renfrew South	**Thomas Andrew Low** (by-election of 6 September 1923)	Liberal	1908, 1921	3rd term*
Russell	**Charles Murphy** (until postmaster appointment)	Liberal	1904	5th term
Russell	**Charles Murphy** (by-election of 19 January 1922)	Liberal	1904	5th term
Simcoe East	Thomas Edward Manley Chew	Liberal	1908, 1921	2nd term*
Simcoe North	Thomas Edwin Ross	Progressive	1921	1st term
Simcoe South	William Alves Boys	Conservative	1912	3rd term
Timiskaming	Angus McDonald	Independent	1920	2nd term
Toronto Centre	Edmund James Bristol	Conservative	1905	5th term
Toronto East	Edmond Baird Ryckman	Conservative	1921	1st term
Toronto North	Thomas Langton Church	Conservative	1921	1st term
Toronto South	Charles Sheard	Conservative	1917	2nd term
Toronto West	Horatio Clarence Hocken	Conservative	1917	2nd term
Victoria	John Jabez Thurston	Independent	1921	1st term
Waterloo North	William Daum Euler	Liberal	1917	2nd term
Waterloo South	William Elliott	Progressive	1921	1st term
Welland	William Manly German	Liberal	1921	1st term
Wellington North	John Pritchard	Progressive	1921	1st term
Wellington South	Hugh Guthrie	Conservative	1900	6th term
Wentworth	Gordon Crooks Wilson	Conservative	1911	3rd term
York East	Joseph Henry Harris	Conservative	1921	1st term
York North	**William Lyon Mackenzie King** (until appointed Prime Minister)	Liberal	1908, (Note: Waterloo North) 1919	3rd term*
York North	**William Lyon Mackenzie King** (by-election of 19 January 1922)	Liberal	1908, 1919	3rd term*
York South	William Findlay Maclean	Independent Conservative	1892	8th term
York West	Henry Lumley Drayton	Conservative	1919	2nd term

=== Prince Edward Island ===
Electoral district	Name	Party	First elected/previously elected	No. of terms
King's	James Joseph Hughes	Liberal	1900, 1911, 1921	4th term*
Prince	Alfred Edgar MacLean	Liberal	1921	1st term
Queen's*	Donald Alexander Mackinnon	Liberal	1900, 1921	2nd term*
Queen's*	**John Ewen Sinclair**	Liberal	1917	2nd term

=== Quebec ===
Electoral district	Name	Party	First elected/previously elected	No. of terms
Argenteuil	Peter Robert McGibbon (died in office)	Liberal	1917	2nd term
Argenteuil	**Charles Stewart** (by-election of 28 February 1922)	Liberal	1922	1st term
Bagot	Joseph Edmond Marcile	Liberal	1898	7th term
Beauce	**Henri Sévérin Béland** (until government appointment)	Liberal	1902	6th term
Beauce	**Henri Sévérin Béland** (by-election of 19 January 1922)	Liberal	1922	1st term
Beauharnois	Louis Joseph Papineau	Liberal	1908	4th term
Bellechasse	Charles Alphonse Fournier	Liberal	1917	2nd term
Berthier	Joseph-Charles-Théodore Gervais	Liberal	1917	2nd term
Bonaventure	Charles Marcil	Liberal	1900	6th term
Brome	Andrew Ross McMaster	Liberal	1917	2nd term
Chambly—Verchères	Joseph Archambault	Liberal	1917	2nd term
Champlain	Arthur Lesieur Desaulniers	Liberal	1917	2nd term
Charlevoix—Montmorency	Pierre-François Casgrain	Liberal	1917	2nd term
Chicoutimi—Saguenay	Edmond Savard	Liberal	1917	2nd term
Châteauguay—Huntingdon	**James Alexander Robb** (until 29 December 1921 emoulment appointment)	Liberal	1908	4th term
Châteauguay—Huntingdon	**James Alexander Robb** (by-election of 19 January 1922)	Liberal	1908	4th term
Compton	Aylmer Byron Hunt	Liberal	1904, 1917	4th term*
Dorchester	**Lucien Cannon**	Liberal	1917	2nd term
Drummond—Arthabaska	Napoléon Kemner Laflamme	Liberal	1921	1st term
Gaspé	Rodolphe Lemieux (†)	Liberal	1896	7th term
George-Étienne Cartier	Samuel William Jacobs	Liberal	1917	2nd term
Hochelaga	Édouard-Charles St-Père	Liberal	1921	1st term
Hull	Joseph-Éloi Fontaine	Liberal	1917	2nd term
Jacques Cartier	David Arthur Lafortune (died 19 October 1922)	Liberal	1896	7th term
Jacques Cartier	Joseph-Théodule Rhéaume (by-election of 20 November 1922)	Liberal	1922	1st term
Joliette	Jean-Joseph Denis	Liberal	1917	2nd term
Kamouraska	Charles Adolphe Stein (until 5 May 1922 emoulment appointment)	Liberal	1920	2nd term
Kamouraska	Joseph Georges Bouchard (by-election of 15 May 1922)	Liberal	1922	1st term
Labelle	Hyacinthe-Adélard Fortier	Liberal	1917	2nd term
Laprairie—Napierville	Roch Lanctôt	Liberal	1904	5th term
L'Assomption—Montcalm	Paul-Arthur Séguin	Liberal	1908	4th term
Laurier—Outremont	**Lomer Gouin** (until 29 December 1921 emoulment appointment)	Liberal	1921	1st term
Laurier—Outremont	**Lomer Gouin** (by-election of 19 January 1922)	Liberal	1921	1st term
Laval—Two Mountains	Joseph Arthur Calixte Éthier	Liberal	1896	7th term
Lévis	Joseph Boutin Bourassa	Liberal	1911	3rd term
L'Islet	Joseph-Fernand Fafard	Liberal	1917	2nd term
Lotbinière	Thomas Vien	Liberal	1917	2nd term
Maisonneuve	Clément Robitaille	Liberal	1921	1st term
Maskinongé	Eugène Desrochers	Liberal	1921	1st term
Matane	François Jean Pelletier	Liberal	1917	2nd term
Mégantic	Lucien Turcotte Pacaud ‡ (until 26 October 1922 emoulment appointment)	Liberal	1911	3rd term
Mégantic	Eusèbe Roberge (by-election of 20 November 1922)	Liberal	1922	1st term
Missisquoi	William Frederic Kay	Liberal	1911	3rd term
Montmagny	Joseph Bruno Aimé Miville Déchêne	Liberal	1917	2nd term
Nicolet	Arthur Trahan (until 25 April 1923 emoulment appointment)	Liberal	1917	2nd term
Nicolet	Joseph-Félix Descoteaux (by-election of 14 May 1923)	Liberal	1923	1st term
Pontiac	Frank S. Cahill	Liberal	1917	2nd term
Portneuf	Michel-Siméon Delisle	Liberal	1900	6th term
Quebec County	Henri-Edgar Lavigueur	Liberal	1917	2nd term
Quebec East	**Ernest Lapointe** (until 3 January 1922 emoulment appointment)	Liberal	1904	6th term
Quebec East	**Ernest Lapointe** (by-election of 19 January 1922)	Liberal	1904	6th term
Quebec South	Charles Gavan Power	Liberal	1917	2nd term
Quebec West	Georges Parent	Liberal	1904, (Note: Montmorency) 1917	4th term*
Richelieu	**Arthur Cardin** (until 30 January 1924 emoulment appointment)	Liberal	1911	3rd term
Richelieu	**Arthur Cardin** (by-election of 27 February 1924)	Liberal	1911	3rd term
Richmond—Wolfe	Edmund William Tobin	Liberal	1900	6th term
Rimouski	Joseph-Émile-Stanislas-Émmanuel D'Anjou (until 19 July 1924 registrar appointment)	Liberal	1917	2nd term
Rimouski	Eugène Fiset (by-election of 2 September 1924)	Liberal	1924	1st term
St. Ann	Joseph Charles Walsh	Liberal	1906, 1921	2nd term*
St. Antoine	Walter George Mitchell (resigned 14 May 1924)	Liberal	1921	1st term
St. Antoine	William James Hushion (by-election of 2 September 1924)	Liberal	1924	1st term
St. Denis	Joseph-Arthur Denis	Liberal	1921	1st term
St. Hyacinthe—Rouville	René Morin	Liberal	1921	1st term
St. James	Fernand Rinfret	Liberal	1920	2nd term
St. Johns—Iberville	Marie Joseph Demers (until 22 July 1922 emoulment appointment)	Liberal	1906	5th term
St. Johns—Iberville	Aldéric-Joseph Benoit (by-election of 31 August 1922)	Liberal	1922	1st term
St. Lawrence—St. George	**Herbert Meredith Marler**	Liberal	1921	1st term
St. Mary	Hermas Deslauriers	Liberal	1917	2nd term
Shefford	**Georges Henri Boivin**	Liberal	1911	3rd term
Town of Sherbrooke	Francis N. McCrea	Liberal	1911	3rd term
Stanstead	Willis Keith Baldwin	Liberal	1917	2nd term
Terrebonne	Jules-Édouard Prévost	Liberal	1917	2nd term
Three Rivers and St. Maurice	**Jacques Bureau** (until 3 January 1922 emoulment appointment)	Liberal	1900	6th term
Three Rivers and St. Maurice	**Jacques Bureau** (by-election of 19 January 1922)	Liberal	1900	6th term
Témiscouata	Charles Arthur Gauvreau (died 9 October 1924)	Liberal	1897	7th term
Témiscouata	Jean-François Pouliot (by-election of 1 December 1924)	Liberal	1924	1st term
Vaudreuil—Soulanges	Gustave Benjamin Boyer (until 11 March 1922 Senate appointment)	Liberal	1904	5th term
Vaudreuil—Soulanges	Joseph-Rodolphe Ouimet (by-election of 21 March 1922)	Liberal	1922	1st term
Westmount—St. Henri	Paul Mercier	Liberal	1921	1st term
Wright	Romuald Montézuma Gendron	Liberal	1921	1st term
Yamaska	Aimé Boucher	Liberal	1921	2nd term

=== Saskatchewan ===
Electoral district	Name	Party	First elected/previously elected	No. of terms
Assiniboia	Oliver Robert Gould	Progressive	1921	1st term
Battleford	Thomas Henry McConica	Progressive	1921	1st term
Humboldt	Charles Wallace Stewart	Progressive	1921	1st term
Kindersley	Archibald M. Carmichael	Progressive	1921	1st term
Last Mountain	John Frederick Johnston	Progressive	1917	2nd term
Mackenzie	Milton Neil Campbell	Progressive	1921	1st term
Maple Creek	Neil Haman McTaggart	Progressive	1921	1st term
Moose Jaw	Robert Milton Johnson (until election voided 22 February 1923)	Progressive	1921	1st term
Moose Jaw	Edward Nicholas Hopkins (by-election of 10 April 1923)	Progressive	1923	1st term
North Battleford	Claudius Charles Davies	Progressive	1921	1st term
Prince Albert	Andrew Knox	Progressive	1917	2nd term
Qu'Appelle	John Millar	Progressive	1921	1st term
Regina	**William Richard Motherwell** (until 3 January 1922 emoulment appointment)	Liberal	1921	1st term
Regina	**William Richard Motherwell** (by-election of 19 January 1922)	Liberal	1921	1st term
Saltcoats	Thomas Sales	Progressive	1921	1st term
Saskatoon	John Evans	Progressive	1921	1st term
Swift Current	Arthur John Lewis	Progressive	1921	1st term
Weyburn	John Morrison	Progressive	1921	1st term

=== Yukon ===
Electoral district	Name	Party	First elected/previously elected	No. of terms
Yukon	George Black	Conservative	1921	1st term

== By-elections ==
By-election	Date	Incumbent	Party	Winner	Party	Cause	Retained
Témiscouata	December 1, 1924	Charles Arthur Gauvreau	Liberal	Jean-François Pouliot	Liberal	Death	Yes
Hastings West	November 25, 1924	Edward Guss Porter	Conservative	Charles Edward Hanna	Liberal	Resignation in protest at the James Murdock-Home Bank incident.,	No
Yale	November 6, 1924	John Armstrong MacKelvie	Conservative	Grote Stirling	Conservative	Death	Yes
Northumberland	October 7, 1924	John Morrissy	Liberal	William Bunting Snowball	Liberal	Death	Yes
Rimouski	September 2, 1924	Joseph-Émile-Stanislas-Émmanuel D'Anjou	Liberal	Eugène Fiset	Liberal	Appointed Registrar of Deeds for the County of Rimouski.	Yes
St. Antoine	September 2, 1924	Walter George Mitchell	Liberal	William James Hushion	Liberal	Resigned	Yes
Richelieu	February 27, 1924	Arthur Cardin	Liberal	Arthur Cardin	Liberal	Recontested upon appointment as Minister of Marine and Fisheries.	Yes
Kent	December 20, 1923	Auguste Théophile Léger	Liberal	Alexandre-Joseph Doucet	Conservative	Death	No
Halifax	December 5, 1923	Alexander Kenneth Maclean	Liberal	William Anderson Black	Conservative	Resignation.	No
Winnipeg North	October 24, 1923	Edward James McMurray	Liberal	Edward James McMurray	Liberal	Recontested upon appointment as Solicitor General of Canada.	Yes
Renfrew South	September 6, 1923	Thomas Andrew Low	Liberal	Thomas Andrew Low	Liberal	Recontested upon appointment as Minister of Trade and Commerce.	Yes
Pictou	September 6, 1923	Edward Mortimer Macdonald	Liberal	Edward Mortimer Macdonald	Liberal	Recontested upon appointment as Minister of National Defence.	Yes
North Cape Breton and Victoria	July 31, 1923	Daniel Duncan McKenzie	Liberal	Fenwick Lionel Kelly	Liberal	Appointed a judge of the Supreme Court of Nova Scotia	Yes
Nicolet	May 14, 1923	Arthur Trahan	Liberal	Joseph-Félix Descôteaux	Liberal	Appointed a judge of the Superior Court of Quebec	Yes
Moose Jaw	April 10, 1923	Robert Milton Johnson	Progressive	Edward Nicholas Hopkins	Progressive	Election declared void.	Yes
Essex North	March 1, 1923	William Costello Kennedy	Liberal	Albert Frederick Healy	Liberal	Death	Yes
Halifax	December 4, 1922	Edward Blackadder	Liberal	Robert Emmett Finn	Liberal	Death	Yes
Lanark	December 4, 1922	John Alexander Stewart	Conservative	Richard Franklin Preston	Conservative	Death	Yes
Jacques Cartier	November 20, 1922	David Arthur Lafortune	Liberal	Joseph-Théodule Rhéaume	Liberal	Death	Yes
Mégantic	November 20, 1922	Lucien Turcotte Pacaud	Liberal	Eusèbe Roberge	Liberal	Appointed Secretary to the Canadian High Commissioner to London.	Yes
Gloucester	November 20, 1922	Onésiphore Turgeon	Liberal	Jean George Robichaud	Liberal	Called to the Senate.	Yes
St. Johns—Iberville	August 31, 1922	Marie-Joseph Demers	Liberal	Aldéric-Joseph Benoit	Liberal	Resignation.	Yes
Kamouraska	May 15, 1922	Charles Adolphe Stein	Liberal	Joseph Georges Bouchard	Liberal	Appointed a judge of the Superior Court of Quebec.	Yes
Vaudreuil-Soulanges	March 21, 1922	Gustave Benjamin Boyer	Liberal	Joseph-Rodolphe Ouimet	Liberal	Called to the Senate.	Yes
Kootenay East	March 14, 1922	Robert Ethelbert Beattie	Liberal	James Horace King	Liberal	Resignation.	Yes
Argenteuil	February 28, 1922	Peter Robert McGibbon	Liberal	Charles Stewart	Liberal	Death	Yes
Grenville	January 26, 1922	Arza Clair Casselman	Conservative	Arthur Meighen	Conservative	Resignation to provide a seat for Meighen.	Yes
Regina	January 19, 1922	William Richard Motherwell	Liberal	William Richard Motherwell	Liberal	Recontested upon appointment as Minister of Agriculture .	Yes
Beauce	January 19, 1922	Henri Sévérin Béland	Liberal	Henri Sévérin Béland	Liberal	Recontested upon appointment as Minister of Soldiers' Civil Re-establishment.	Yes
Three Rivers and St. Maurice	January 19, 1922	Jacques Bureau	Liberal	Jacques Bureau	Liberal	Recontested upon appointment as Minister of Customs and Excise.	Yes
Westmorland	January 19, 1922	Arthur Bliss Copp	Liberal	Arthur Bliss Copp	Liberal	Recontested upon appointment as Secretary of State for Canada.	Yes
Shelburne and Queen's	January 19, 1922	William Stevens Fielding	Liberal	William Stevens Fielding	Liberal	Recontested upon appointment as Minister of Finance.	Yes
Laurier—Outremont	January 19, 1922	Lomer Gouin	Liberal	Lomer Gouin	Liberal	Recontested upon appointment as Minister of Justice.	Yes
Essex South	January 19, 1922	George Perry Graham	Liberal	George Perry Graham	Liberal	Recontested upon appointment as Minister of Militia and Defence and Minister of Naval Service.	Yes
Essex North	January 19, 1922	William Costello Kennedy	Liberal	William Costello Kennedy	Liberal	Recontested upon appointment as Minister of Railways and Canals.	Yes
York North	January 19, 1922	William Lyon Mackenzie King	Liberal	William Lyon Mackenzie King	Liberal	Recontested upon appointment as Prime Minister.	Yes
Quebec East	January 19, 1922	Ernest Lapointe	Liberal	Ernest Lapointe	Liberal	Recontested upon appointment as Minister of Marine and Fisheries .	Yes
North Cape Breton and Victoria	January 19, 1922	Daniel Duncan McKenzie	Liberal	Daniel Duncan McKenzie	Liberal	Recontested upon appointment as Solicitor General.	Yes
Kent	January 19, 1922	Archibald McCoig	Liberal	James Murdock	Liberal	Called to the Senate to provide a seat for Murdock	Yes
Russell	January 19, 1922	Charles Murphy	Liberal	Charles Murphy	Liberal	Recontested upon appointment as Postmaster General.	Yes
Châteauguay—Huntingdon	January 19, 1922	James Robb	Liberal	James Robb	Liberal	Recontested upon appointment as Minister of Trade and Commerce .	Yes
