= 11th Canadian Parliament =

1909–1911 legislative term

- Majority parliament
- Jan. 20, 1909 – Jul. 29, 1911

Parliament leaders
- Prime minister: Rt. Hon. Sir Wilfrid Laurier; Jul. 11, 1896 – Oct. 6, 1911
- Cabinet: 8th Canadian Ministry
- Leader of the Opposition: Hon. Robert Borden; February 6, 1901 – October 9, 1911

Party caucuses
- Government: Liberal Party
- Opposition: Conservative Party & Liberal-Conservative
- Crossbench: Labour

House of Commons
- Seating arrangements of the House of Commons
- Speaker of the Commons: Hon. Charles Marcil; January 20, 1909 – November 14, 1911
- Members: 221 MP seats List of members

Senate
- Speaker of the Senate: Hon. James Kerr; January 14, 1909 – October 22, 1911
- Government Senate leader: Sir Richard John Cartwright; 1909 – October 6, 1911
- Opposition Senate leader: Sir James Alexander Lougheed; April 1, 1906 – October 6, 1911

Sovereign
- Monarch: Edward VII; 22 January 1901 – 6 May 1910
- George V 6 May 1910 – 20 January 1936
- Governor general: The Earl Grey; Dec. 10, 1904 – Oct. 13, 1911

Sessions
- 1st session January 20, 1909 – May 19, 1909
- 2nd session November 11, 1909 – May 4, 1910
- 3rd session November 17, 1910 – July 29, 1911
← 10th	→ 12th

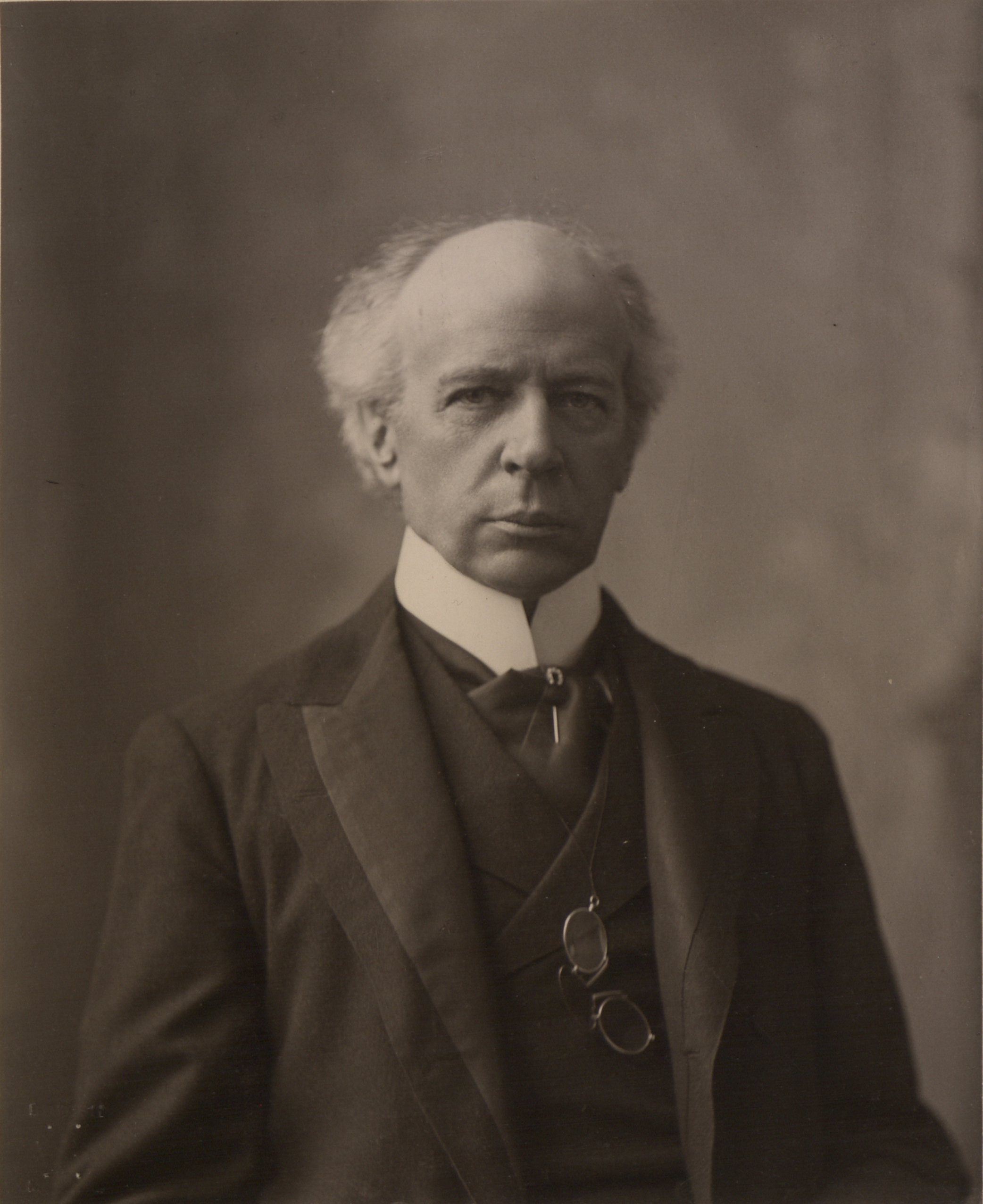
Sir Wilfrid Laurier was Prime Minister during the 11th Canadian Parliament.

The 11th Canadian Parliament was in session from January 20, 1909, until July 29, 1911 (2 years and 191 days). The membership was set by the 1908 federal election on October 26, 1908, and it changed only somewhat due to resignations and by-elections until it was dissolved prior to the 1911 election.

It was controlled by a Liberal Party majority under Prime Minister Sir Wilfrid Laurier and the 8th Canadian Ministry. The Official Opposition was the Conservative/Liberal-Conservative, led by Robert Borden.

The Speaker was Charles Marcil. See also List of Canadian electoral districts 1907-1914 for a list of the ridings in this parliament.

== List of members ==
Following is a full list of members of the eleventh Parliament listed first by province, then by electoral district.

Key:

- Party leaders are italicized.
- Cabinet ministers are in **boldface**.
- The Prime Minister is **both**.
- The Speaker is indicated by "(†)".

Electoral districts denoted by an asterisk (*) indicates that district was represented by two members.

=== Alberta ===
Electoral district	Name	Party	First elected/previously elected	No. of terms
Calgary	Maitland Stewart McCarthy	Conservative	1904	2nd term
Edmonton	**Frank Oliver**	Liberal	1896	4th term
Macleod	John Herron	Liberal-Conservative	1904	2nd term
Medicine Hat	Charles Alexander Magrath	Conservative	1908	1st term
Red Deer	Michael Clark	Liberal	1908	1st term
Strathcona	Wilbert McIntyre (died 21 July 1909)	Liberal	1906	2nd term
Strathcona	James McCrie Douglas (by-election of 1909-10-20)	Liberal	1909	1st term
Victoria	William Henry White	Liberal	1908	1st term

=== British Columbia ===
Electoral district	Name	Party	First elected/previously elected	No. of terms
Comox—Atlin	William Sloan (resigned 21 January 1909 to allow seat for Templeman)	Liberal	1904	2nd term
Comox—Atlin	**William Templeman** (by-election of 1909-02-08)	Liberal	1906, (Note: Victoria City) 1909	2nd term*
Kootenay	Arthur Samuel Goodeve	Conservative	1908	1st term
Nanaimo	Ralph Smith	Liberal	1900	3rd term
New Westminster	James Davis Taylor	Conservative	1908	1st term
Vancouver City	George Henry Cowan	Conservative	1908	1st term
Victoria City	George Henry Barnard	Conservative	1908	1st term
Yale—Cariboo	Martin Burrell	Conservative	1908	1st term

=== Manitoba ===
Electoral district	Name	Party	First elected/previously elected	No. of terms
Brandon	Clifford Sifton	Liberal	1896	4th term
Dauphin	Glenlyon Campbell	Conservative	1908	1st term
Lisgar	William Henry Sharpe	Conservative	1908	1st term
Macdonald	William D. Staples	Conservative	1904	2nd term
Marquette	William James Roche	Conservative	1896	4th term
Portage la Prairie	Arthur Meighen	Conservative	1908	1st term
Provencher	John Patrick Molloy	Liberal	1908	1st term
Selkirk	George Henry Bradbury	Conservative	1908	1st term
Souris	Frederick Laurence Schaffner	Conservative	1904	2nd term
Winnipeg	Alexander Haggart	Conservative	1908	1st term

=== New Brunswick ===
Electoral district	Name	Party	First elected/previously elected	No. of terms
Carleton	Frank Broadstreet Carvell	Liberal	1904	2nd term
Charlotte	William Frederick Todd	Liberal	1908	1st term
City and County of St. John	**William Pugsley**	Liberal	1907	2nd term
City of St. John	John Waterhouse Daniel	Conservative	1904	3rd term
Gloucester	Onésiphore Turgeon	Liberal	1900	3rd term
Kent	Olivier J. Leblanc	Liberal	1900	3rd term
King's and Albert	Duncan Hamilton McAlister	Liberal	1908	1st term
Northumberland	William Stewart Loggie	Liberal	1904	2nd term
Restigouche	James Reid	Liberal	1900	3rd term
Sunbury—Queen's	Hugh Havelock McLean	Liberal	1908	1st term
Victoria	Pius Michaud	Liberal	1907	2nd term
Westmorland	Henry Emmerson	Liberal	1900	3rd term
York	Oswald Smith Crocket	Conservative	1904	2nd term

=== Nova Scotia ===
Electoral district	Name	Party	First elected/previously elected	No. of terms
Annapolis	Samuel Walter Willet Pickup	Liberal	1904	2nd term
Antigonish	William Chisholm	Liberal	1905	2nd term
Cape Breton South	James William Maddin	Liberal-Conservative	1908	1st term
Colchester	John Stanfield	Conservative	1907	2nd term
Cumberland	Edgar Nelson Rhodes	Conservative	1908	1st term
Digby	Clarence Jameson	Conservative	1908	1st term
Guysborough	John Howard Sinclair	Liberal	1904	3rd term
Halifax*	Robert Laird Borden	Conservative	1896, 1905	4th term*
Halifax*	Adam Brown Crosby	Conservative	1908	1st term
Hants	Judson Burpee Black	Liberal	1904	2nd term
Inverness	Alexander William Chisholm	Liberal	1908	1st term
Kings	**Frederick William Borden**	Liberal	1874, 1887	8th term*
Lunenburg	Alexander Kenneth Maclean (resigned 23 October 1909)	Liberal	1904	2nd term
Lunenburg	John Drew Sperry (by-election of 1909-12-22)	Liberal	1909	1st term
North Cape Breton and Victoria	Daniel Duncan McKenzie	Liberal	1904, 1908	2nd term*
Pictou	Edward Mortimer Macdonald	Liberal	1904	2nd term
Richmond	George William Kyte	Liberal	1908	1st term
Shelburne and Queen's	**William Stevens Fielding**	Liberal	1896	4th term
Yarmouth	Bowman Brown Law	Liberal	1902	3rd term

=== Ontario ===
Electoral district	Name	Party	First elected/previously elected	No. of terms
Algoma East	William Ross Smyth	Conservative	1908	1st term
Algoma West	Arthur Cyril Boyce	Conservative	1904	2nd term
Brantford	Lloyd Harris	Liberal	1908	1st term
Brant	**William Paterson**	Liberal	1872	10th term
Brockville	**George Perry Graham**	Liberal	1907	2nd term
Bruce North	John Tolmie	Liberal	1906	2nd term
Bruce South	James J. Donnelly	Conservative	1904, 1908	2nd term*
Carleton	Robert Laird Borden (resigned to maintain seat in Halifax)	Conservative	1896, (Note: Halifax (Nova Scotia)) 1905	4th term*
Carleton	Edward Kidd (by-election of 1909-02-22)	Conservative	1909	1st term
Dufferin	John Barr (died 19 November 1909)	Conservative	1904	2nd term
Dufferin	John Best (by-election of 1909-12-22)	Conservative	1909	1st term
Dundas	Andrew Broder	Conservative	1896	4th term
Durham	Charles Jonas Thornton	Conservative	1900, 1908	2nd term*
Elgin East	David Marshall	Conservative	1906	2nd term
Elgin West	Thomas Wilson Crothers	Conservative	1908	1st term
Essex North	Robert Franklin Sutherland (until 21 October 1909 judicial appointment)	Liberal	1908	1st term
Essex North	Oliver James Wilcox (by-election of 1909-11-10)	Conservative	1909	1st term
Essex South	Alfred Henry Clarke	Liberal	1904	2nd term
Frontenac	John Wesley Edwards	Conservative	1908	1st term
Glengarry	John Angus McMillan	Liberal	1908	1st term
Grenville	John Dowsley Reid	Conservative	1896	4th term
Grey East	Thomas Simpson Sproule	Conservative	1878	8th term
Grey North	William Sora Middlebro	Conservative	1908	1st term
Grey South	Henry Horton Miller	Liberal	1904	2nd term
Haldimand	Francis Ramsey Lalor	Conservative	1904	2nd term
Halton	David Henderson	Conservative	1887, 1888	7th term*
Hamilton East	Samuel Barker	Conservative	1900	3rd term
Hamilton West	Thomas Joseph Stewart	Conservative	1908	1st term
Hastings East	William Barton Northrup	Conservative	1892, 1900	4th term*
Hastings West	Edward Guss Porter	Conservative	1902	3rd term
Huron East	Thomas Chisholm	Conservative	1904	2nd term
Huron South	Murdo Young McLean	Liberal	1908	2nd term
Huron West	Edward Norman Lewis	Conservative	1904	2nd term
Kent East	David Alexander Gordon	Liberal	1904	2nd term
Kent West	Archibald Blake McCoig	Liberal	1908	1st term
Kingston	William Harty	Liberal	1902	3rd term
Lambton East	Joseph Elijah Armstrong	Conservative	1904	3rd term
Lambton West	Frederick Forsyth Pardee	Liberal	1905	2nd term
Lanark North	William Thoburn	Conservative	1908	1st term
Lanark South	John Graham Haggart	Conservative	1872	10th term
Leeds	George Taylor	Conservative	1882	7th term
Lennox and Addington	Uriah Wilson	Conservative	1892	5th term
Lincoln	Edward Arthur Lancaster	Conservative	1900	3rd term
London	Thomas Beattie	Conservative	1891, 1900	4th term*
Middlesex East	Peter Elson	Conservative	1904	2nd term
Middlesex North	Alexander Wilson Smith	Liberal	1908	1st term
Middlesex West	William Samuel Calvert (until 21 October 1909 railway appointment)	Liberal	1896	4th term
Middlesex West	Duncan Campbell Ross (by-election of 1909-11-10)	Liberal	1909	1st term
Muskoka	William Wright	Conservative	1904	2nd term
Nipissing	George Gordon	Conservative	1908	1st term
Norfolk	Alexander McCall	Conservative	1908	1st term
Northumberland East	Charles Lewis Owen	Conservative	1907	2nd term
Northumberland West	John B. McColl	Liberal	1900	3rd term
Ontario North	Samuel Simpson Sharpe	Conservative	1908	1st term
Ontario South	Frederick Luther Fowke	Liberal	1908	1st term
Ottawa (City of)*	Wilfrid Laurier (until resignation)	Liberal	1874	9th term
Ottawa (City of)*	Harold Buchanan McGiverin	Liberal	1908	1st term
Ottawa (City of)*	Albert Allard (by-election of 1910-01-29, replaces Laurier)	Liberal	1910	1st term
Oxford North	Edward Walter Nesbitt	Liberal	1908	1st term
Oxford South	Malcolm Smith Schell	Liberal	1904	2nd term
Parry Sound	James Arthurs	Conservative	1908	1st term
Peel	Richard Blain	Conservative	1900	3rd term
Perth North	James Palmer Rankin	Liberal	1908	1st term
Perth South	Gilbert Howard McIntyre	Liberal	1904	2nd term
Peterborough East	John Albert Sexsmith	Conservative	1908	1st term
Peterborough West	James Robert Stratton	Liberal	1908	1st term
Prescott	Edmond Proulx	Liberal	1904	2nd term
Prince Edward	Morley Currie	Liberal	1908	1st term
Renfrew North	Gerald Verner White	Conservative	1906	2nd term
Renfrew South	Thomas Andrew Low	Liberal	1908	1st term
Russell	**Charles Murphy**	Liberal	1904	2nd term
Simcoe East	Thomas Edward Manley Chew	Liberal	1908	1st term
Simcoe North	John Allister Currie	Conservative	1908	1st term
Simcoe South	Haughton Lennox	Conservative	1900	3rd term
Stormont	Robert Smith	Liberal	1908	1st term
Thunder Bay and Rainy River	James Conmee	Liberal	1904	2nd term
Toronto Centre	Edmund James Bristol	Conservative	1905	2nd term
Toronto East	Joseph Russell	Independent	1908	1st term
Toronto North	George Eulas Foster	Conservative	1882, (Note: King's/York (New Brunswick)) 1904	6th term*
Toronto South	Angus Claude Macdonell	Conservative	1904	2nd term
Toronto West	Edmund Boyd Osler	Conservative	1896	4th term
Victoria	Sam Hughes	Liberal-Conservative	1892	5th term
Waterloo North	**William Lyon Mackenzie King** (until ministerial appointment)	Liberal	1908	1st term
Waterloo North	**William Lyon Mackenzie King** (by-election of 1909-06-21)	Liberal	1908	1st term
Waterloo South	George Adam Clare	Conservative	1900	3rd term
Welland	William Manly German	Liberal	1891, 1900	4th term*
Wellington North	Alexander Munro Martin	Liberal	1907	2nd term
Wellington South	Hugh Guthrie	Liberal	1900	3rd term
Wentworth	William Oscar Sealey	Liberal	1908	1st term
York Centre	Thomas George Wallace	Conservative	1908	1st term
York North	**Allen Bristol Aylesworth**	Liberal	1905	2nd term
York South	William Findlay Maclean	Independent Conservative	1892	5th term

=== Prince Edward Island ===
Electoral district	Name	Party	First elected/previously elected	No. of terms
King's	Austin Levi Fraser	Conservative	1908	1st term
Prince	James William Richards	Liberal	1908	1st term
Queen's*	Lemuel Ezra Prowse	Liberal	1908	1st term
Queen's*	Alexander Bannerman Warburton	Liberal	1908	1st term

=== Quebec ===
Electoral district	Name	Party	First elected/previously elected	No. of terms
Argenteuil	George Halsey Perley	Conservative	1904	2nd term
Bagot	Joseph Edmond Marcile	Liberal	1898	4th term
Beauce	**Henri Sévérin Béland**	Liberal	1902	3rd term
Beauharnois	Louis-Joseph Papineau	Liberal	1908	1st term
Bellechasse	Onésiphore Ernest Talbot	Liberal	1896	4th term
Berthier	Arthur Ecrément	Liberal	1908	1st term
Bonaventure	Charles Marcil (†)	Liberal	1900	3rd term
Brome	**Sydney Arthur Fisher**	Liberal	1896	4th term
Chambly—Verchères	Victor Geoffrion	Liberal	1900	4th term
Champlain	Pierre Édouard Blondin	Conservative	1908	1st term
Charlevoix	Joseph David Rodolphe Forget	Conservative	1904	2nd term
Chicoutimi—Saguenay	Joseph Girard	Conservative	1900	3rd term
Châteauguay	James Pollock Brown	Liberal	1891	5th term
Compton	Aylmer Byron Hunt	Liberal	1904	2nd term
Dorchester	Joseph Alfred Ernest Roy	Liberal	1908	1st term
Drummond—Arthabaska	Louis Lavergne (until Senate appointment)	Liberal	1897	4th term
Drummond—Arthabaska	Arthur Gilbert (by-election of 1910-11-03)	Nationaliste	1910	1st term
Gaspé	**Rodolphe Lemieux**	Liberal	1896	4th term
Hochelaga	Louis Alfred Adhémar Rivet	Liberal	1904	3rd term
Huntingdon	James Alexander Robb	Liberal	1908	1st term
Jacques Cartier	Frederick Debartzch Monk	Conservative	1896	4th term
Joliette	Joseph Adélard Dubeau	Liberal	1904	2nd term
Kamouraska	Ernest Lapointe	Liberal	1904	3rd term
Labelle	Charles Beautrom Major	Liberal	1907	2nd term
Laprairie—Napierville	Roch Lanctôt	Liberal	1904	2nd term
L'Assomption	Paul-Arthur Séguin	Liberal	1908	1st term
Laval	Charles Avila Wilson	Liberal	1908	1st term
Lévis	Louis Auguste Carrier	Liberal	1905	2nd term
L'Islet	Eugène Paquet	Conservative	1904	2nd term
Lotbinière	Edmond Fortier (until election voided 29 September 1909)	Liberal	1900	4th term
Lotbinière	Edmond Fortier (by-election of 1909-10-26)	Liberal	1900	4th term
Maisonneuve	Alphonse Verville	Labour	1906	2nd term
Maskinongé	Hormidas Mayrand	Liberal	1903	3rd term
Mégantic	François Théodore Savoie	Liberal	1904	2nd term
Missisquoi	Daniel Bishop Meigs	Liberal	1888, 1896	5th term*
Montcalm	François Octave Dugas (until 6 September 1909 judicial appointment)	Liberal	1900	3rd term
Montcalm	David Arthur Lafortune (by-election of 1909-09-25)	Independent Liberal	1909	1st term
Montmagny	Cyrias Roy	Liberal	1908	1st term
Montmorency	Georges Parent	Liberal	1904	2nd term
Nicolet	Gustave Adolphe Turcotte	Liberal	1907	2nd term
Pontiac	George Frederick Hodgins	Liberal	1908	1st term
Portneuf	Michel-Siméon Delisle	Liberal	1900	3rd term
Quebec-Centre	Arthur Lachance	Liberal	1905	2nd term
Quebec County	Joseph Pierre Turcotte	Liberal	1908	1st term
Quebec East	**Wilfrid Laurier**	Liberal	1874	9th term
Quebec West	William Price	Conservative	1908	1st term
Richelieu	Adélard Lanctôt	Liberal	1907	2nd term
Richmond—Wolfe	Edmund William Tobin	Liberal	1900	3rd term
Rimouski	Jean Auguste Ross	Liberal	1897	4th term
Rouville	**Louis Philippe Brodeur**	Liberal	1904	2nd term
Shefford	Henry Edgarton Allen	Liberal	1908	1st term
Town of Sherbrooke	Arthur Norreys Worthington	Conservative	1904	2nd term
Soulanges	Joseph Arthur Lortie	Conservative	1896	4th term
St. Anne	Charles Joseph Doherty	Conservative	1908	1st term
Stanstead	Charles Henry Lovell	Liberal	1907	2nd term
St. Antoine	Herbert Brown Ames	Conservative	1904	2nd term
St. Hyacinthe	Aimé Majorique Beauparlant	Liberal	1904	2nd term
St. James	Honoré Hippolyte Achille Gervais	Liberal	1904	2nd term
St. Johns—Iberville	Marie Joseph Demers	Liberal	1906	2nd term
St. Lawrence	Robert Bickerdike	Liberal	1900	3rd term
St. Mary	Médéric Martin	Liberal	1908	1st term
Terrebonne	Wilfrid Bruno Nantel	Conservative	1908	1st term
Three Rivers and St. Maurice	**Jacques Bureau**	Liberal	1900	3rd term
Témiscouata	Charles Arthur Gauvreau	Liberal	1897	4th term
Two Mountains	Joseph Arthur Calixte Éthier	Liberal	1896	4th term
Vaudreuil	Gustave Benjamin Boyer	Liberal	1904	2nd term
Wright	Emmanuel Berchmans Devlin	Liberal	1904	2nd term
Yamaska	Oscar Gladu	Liberal	1904	2nd term

=== Saskatchewan ===
Electoral district	Name	Party	First elected/previously elected	No. of terms
Assiniboia	John Gillanders Turriff	Liberal	1904	2nd term
Battleford	Albert Champagne	Liberal	1908	1st term
Humboldt	David Bradley Neely	Liberal	1908	1st term
Mackenzie	Edward L. Cash	Liberal	1904	2nd term
Moose Jaw	William Erskine Knowles	Liberal	1908	1st term
Prince Albert	William Windfield Rutan	Liberal	1908	1st term
Qu'Appelle	Richard Stuart Lake	Conservative	1904	2nd term
Regina	William Melville Martin	Liberal	1908	1st term
Saltcoats	Thomas MacNutt	Liberal	1908	1st term
Saskatoon	George Ewan McCraney	Liberal	1908	1st term

=== Yukon ===
Electoral district	Name	Party	First elected/previously elected	No. of terms
Yukon	Frederick Tennyson Congdon	Liberal	1908	1st term

== By-elections ==
By-election	Date	Incumbent	Party	Winner	Party	Cause	Retained
Drummond—Arthabaska	November 3, 1910	Louis Lavergne	Liberal	Arthur Gilbert	Nationalist	Called to the Senate	No
City of Ottawa	January 29, 1910	Sir Wilfrid Laurier	Liberal	Albert Allard	Liberal	Chose to sit for Quebec East.	Yes
Dufferin	December 22, 1909	John Barr	Conservative	John Best	Conservative	Death	Yes
Lunenburg	December 22, 1909	Alexander Kenneth Maclean	Liberal	John Drew Sperry	Liberal	Resignation	Yes
Middlesex West	November 20, 1909	William Samuel Calvert	Liberal	Duncan Campbell Ross	Liberal	Appointed to the National Transcontinental Railway Commission	Yes
Essex North	November 20, 1909	Robert Franklin Sutherland	Liberal	Oliver James Wilcox	Conservative	Appointed a judge	No
Lotbinière	October 26, 1909	Edmond Fortier	Liberal	Edmond Fortier	Liberal	Election declared void	Yes
Strathcona	October 20, 1909	Wilbert McIntyre	Liberal	James McCrie Douglas	Liberal	Death	Yes
Montcalm	September 25, 1909	François Octave Dugas	Liberal	David Arthur Lafortune	Independent Liberal	Appointed a judge of the Superior Court of Quebec	No
Waterloo North	June 21, 1909	William Lyon Mackenzie King	Liberal	William Lyon Mackenzie King	Liberal	Recontested upon appointment as Minister of Labour.	Yes
Carleton	February 22, 1909	Robert Borden	Conservative	Edward Kidd	Conservative	Chose to sit for Halifax	Yes
Comox—Atlin	February 8, 1909	William Sloan	Liberal	William Templeman	Liberal	Resignation to provide a seat for Templeman	Yes
