= By-elections to the 9th Canadian Parliament =

By-elections to the 9th Canadian Parliament were held to elect members of the House of Commons of Canada between the 1900 federal election and the 1904 federal election. The Liberal Party of Canada led a majority government for the 9th Canadian Parliament.

The list includes Ministerial by-elections which occurred due to the requirement that Members of Parliament recontest their seats upon being appointed to Cabinet. These by-elections were almost always uncontested. This requirement was abolished in 1931.

By-election	Date	Incumbent	Party	Winner	Party	Cause	Retained
Guysborough	March 16, 1904	Duncan Cameron Fraser	Liberal	John Howard Sinclair	Liberal	Appointed to Supreme Court of Nova Scotia	Yes
Gaspé	February 20, 1904	Rodolphe Lemieux	Liberal	Rodolphe Lemieux	Liberal	Recontested upon appointment as Solicitor-General	Yes
Lambton East	February 16, 1904	Oliver Simmons	Conservative	Joseph Elijah Armstrong	Conservative	Death	Yes
St. Hyacinthe	February 16, 1904	Michel Esdras Bernier	Liberal	Jean Baptiste Blanchet	Liberal	Appointed a Railway Commissioner	Yes
City of St. John	February 16, 1904	Andrew George Blair	Liberal	John Waterhouse Daniel	Conservative	Appointed head of the Board of Railway Commissioners	No
Bruce East	February 16, 1904	Henry Cargill	Conservative	James J. Donnelly	Conservative	Death	Yes
St. James	February 16, 1904	Joseph Brunet	Liberal	Honoré Hippolyte Achille Gervais	Liberal	Election declared void	Yes
West Queen's	February 16, 1904	Donald Farquharson	Liberal	Horace Haszard	Liberal	Death	Yes
Montmagny	February 16, 1904	Pierre-Raymond-Léonard Martineau	Liberal	Armand Lavergne	Liberal	Death	Yes
Hochelaga	February 16, 1904	Joseph Alexandre Camille Madore	Liberal	Louis-Alfred-Adhémar Rivet	Liberal	Appointed Puisne Judge of the Supreme Court of Quebec	Yes
Kamouraska	February 12, 1904	Henry George Carroll	Liberal	Ernest Lapointe	Liberal	Appointed a judge	Yes
Rouville	January 30, 1904	Louis-Philippe Brodeur	Liberal	Louis-Philippe Brodeur	Liberal	Recontested upon appointment as Minister of Inland Revenue	Yes
Westmorland	January 30, 1904	Henry Emmerson	Liberal	Henry Emmerson	Liberal	Recontested upon appointment as Minister of Railways and Canals	Yes
Russell	April 20, 1903	William C. Edwards	Liberal	David Wardrope Wallace	Liberal	Called to Senate	Yes
Ontario North	March 10, 1903	Angus McLeod	Liberal-Conservative	George Davidson Grant	Liberal	Death	No
Maskinongé	March 3, 1903	Joseph-Hormisdas Legris	Liberal	Hormidas Mayrand	Liberal	Called to Senate	Yes
Terrebonne	February 24, 1903	Raymond Préfontaine	Liberal	Samuel Desjardins	Liberal	Recontested upon ministerial appointment. Préfontaine was elected in two ridings simultaneously and chose to stand for re-election in Maisonneuve	Yes
Two Mountains	February 24, 1903	Joseph Arthur Calixte Éthier	Liberal	Joseph Arthur Calixte Éthier	Liberal	Election declared void	Yes
Grey North	February 24, 1903	Edward Henry Horsey	Liberal	Thomas Inkerman Thomson	Conservative	Death	No
Burrard	February 4, 1903	George Ritchie Maxwell	Liberal	Robert George Macpherson	Liberal	Death	Yes
Maisonneuve	December 9, 1902	Raymond Préfontaine	Liberal	Raymond Préfontaine	Liberal	Recontested upon appointment as Minister of Marine and Fisheries	Yes
Argenteuil	December 3, 1902	Thomas Christie	Liberal	Thomas Christie, Jr.	Liberal	Death	Yes
Yarmouth	December 3, 1902	Thomas Barnard Flint	Liberal	Bowman Brown Law	Liberal	Appointed Clerk of the House of Commons	Yes
Yukon	December 2, 1902	New Seat		James Hamilton Ross	Liberal	Newly created electoral district under The Yukon Territory Representation Act 1902	N.A.
Beauharnois	March 26, 1902	George di Madeiros Loy	Liberal	George di Madeiros Loy	Liberal	Election declared void	Yes
Kamouraska	February 28, 1902	Henry George Carroll	Liberal	Henry George Carroll	Liberal	Recontested upon appointment as Solicitor General	Yes
Lisgar	February 18, 1902	Robert Lorne Richardson	Independent	Duncan Alexander Stewart	Liberal	Election declared void	No
Quebec West	January 29, 1902	Richard Reid Dobell	Liberal	William Power	Liberal	Death	Yes
Oxford North	January 29, 1902	James Sutherland	Liberal	James Sutherland	Liberal	Recontested upon appointment as Minister of Marine and Fisheries	Yes
Victoria	January 28, 1902	Edward Gawler Prior	Conservative	George Riley	Liberal	Election declared void	No
Laval	January 15, 1902	Thomas Fortin	Liberal	Joseph-Édouard-Émile Léonard	Conservative	Appointed a judge of the Superior Court of Quebec	No
Addington	January 15, 1902	John William Bell	Conservative	Melzar Avery	Conservative	Death	Yes
Durham West	January 15, 1902	Charles Jonas Thornton	Liberal	Robert Beith	Conservative	Election declared void.	No
St. James	January 15, 1902	Odilon Desmarais	Liberal	Joseph-Édouard-Émile Léonard	Liberal	Appointed a judge of the Superior Court of Quebec	Yes
York West	January 15, 1902	Nathaniel Clarke Wallace	Conservative	Archibald Campbell	Liberal	Death	No
L'Islet	January 15, 1902	Arthur Miville Déchêne	Liberal	Onésiphore Carbonneau	Liberal	Called to the Senate	Yes
West Queen's	January 15, 1902	Louis Henry Davies	Liberal	Donald Farquharson	Liberal	Appointed a justice of the Supreme Court of Canada	Yes
Kingston	January 15, 1902	Byron Moffatt Britton	Liberal	William Harty	Liberal	Appointed a judge of the Court of King's Bench for Ontario	Yes
Hastings West	January 15, 1902	Henry Corby	Conservative	Edward Guss Porter	Conservative	Resignation	Yes
Beauce	January 8, 1902	Joseph Godbout	Liberal	Henri Sévérin Béland	Liberal	Called to the Senate	Yes
York	December 28, 1901	Alexander Gibson	Liberal	Alexander Gibson	Liberal	Election declared void	Yes
East Queen's	March 20, 1901	Donald Alexander MacKinnon	Liberal	Donald Alexander MacKinnon	Liberal	Election declared void	Yes
Bruce North	March 20, 1901	Alexander McNeill	Liberal-Conservative	James Halliday	Conservative	Election declared void	Yes

== See also ==
- List of federal by-elections in Canada

== Sources ==
- Parliament of Canada–Elected in By-Elections
