= Dufferin (federal electoral district) =

Former federal electoral district in Ontario, Canada

Ontario electoral district

Defunct federal electoral district
- Legislature: House of Commons
- District created: 1903
- District abolished: 1924
- First contested: 1904
- Last contested: 1921

Dufferin was a federal electoral district represented in the House of Commons of Canada from 1904 to 1925. It was located in the province of Ontario. This riding was created in 1903 from parts of Cardwell, Grey East, Simcoe South, Wellington Centre and Wellington North ridings.

It consisted of the county of Dufferin.

The electoral district was abolished in 1924 when it was merged with Simcoe South to create the new electoral district of Dufferin—Simcoe.

== Members of Parliament ==
This riding has elected the following members of Parliament:

Parliament	Years	Member	Party
Riding created from Cardwell, Grey East, Simcoe South, Wellington Centre and Wellington North
10th	1904–1908	John Barr	Conservative
11th	1908–1909†	John Barr	Conservative
11th	1909–1911	John Best	Conservative
12th	1911–1917	John Best	Conservative
13th	1917–1921	John Best	Government (Unionist)
14th	1921–1925	Robert John Woods	Progressive
Riding dissolved into Dufferin—Simcoe

== Election results ==
1904 Canadian federal election
Party	Candidate	Votes
Conservative	John Barr	2,100
Unknown	John Park	814

1908 Canadian federal election
Party	Candidate	Votes
Conservative	John Barr	2,240
Liberal	Jasper Noble Fish	797

On Mr. Barr's death, 19 November 1909:

By-election on 22 December 1909
Party	Candidate	Votes
Conservative	John Best	acclaimed

1911 Canadian federal election
Party	Candidate	Votes
Conservative	John Best	2,496
Liberal	David Bent Brown	1,037

1917 Canadian federal election
Party	Candidate	Votes
Government (Unionist)	John Best	3,797
Opposition (Laurier Liberals)	Thomas Charlo Dryden	806

1921 Canadian federal election
Party	Candidate	Votes
Progressive	Robert John Woods	4,052
Conservative	John Best	3,755

== See also ==
- List of Canadian electoral districts
- Historical federal electoral districts of Canada
