= Rockwood Academy (Ontario) =

School in Ontario, Canada

Coordinates: 43.61039°N 80.13291°W

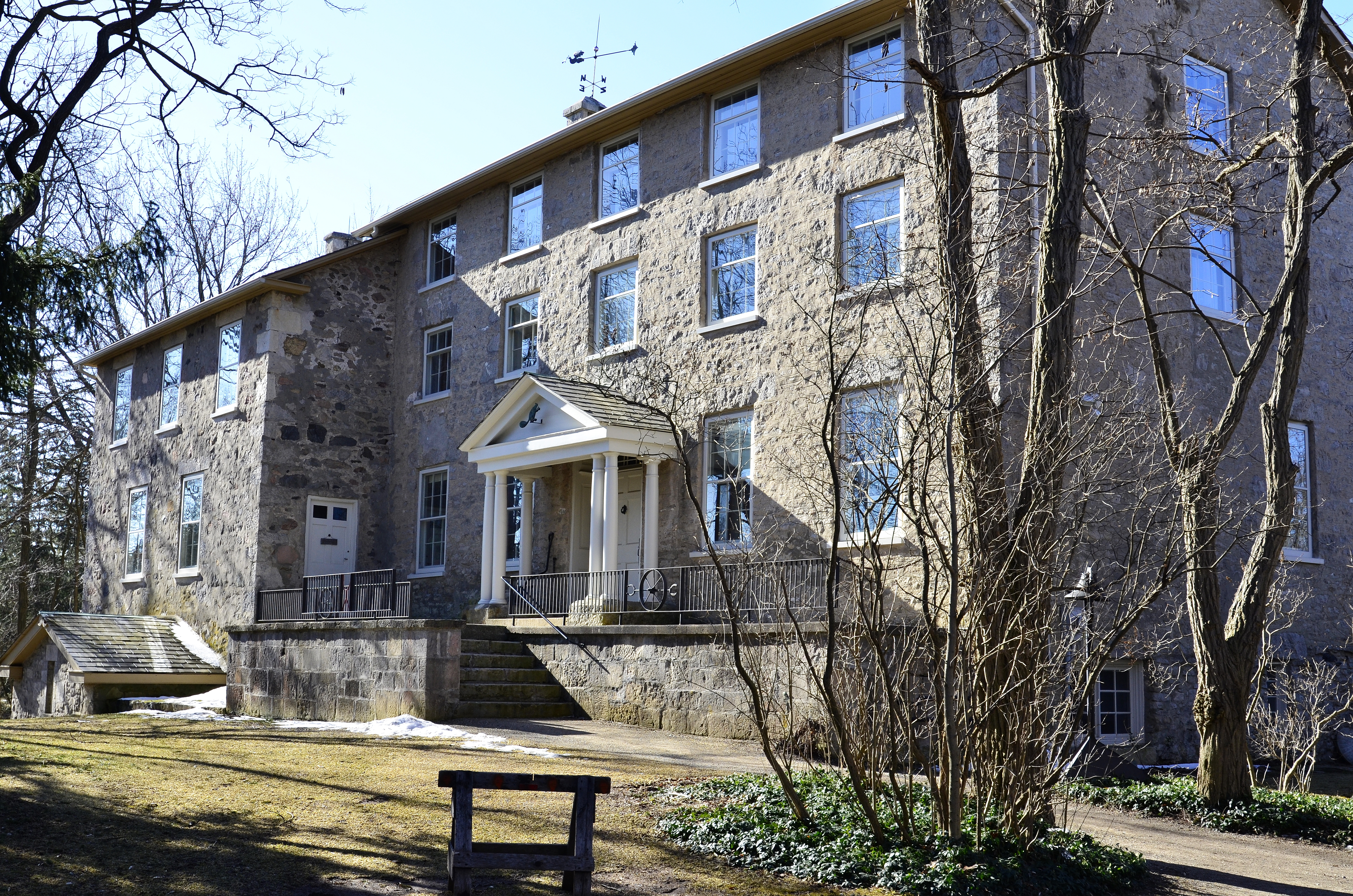
Rockwood Academy, 2017

Rockwood Academy was a private school located at 477 Main Street South, Rockwood, Ontario. Founded in 1850 by William Wetherald, a Quaker, it operated until 1883. Competition with the provincial government's collegiate institutes founded in the 1870s had lessened demand for such private education. Its three-storey stone building, constructed in 1853, still stands in the town.

== Reputation of the Academy ==
Wetherald had previously taught pupils privately in the evenings, and the number of these had grown to such an extent that he decided to open an academy school for older boys and young men. The original curriculum was reasonably standard, consisting of English, mathematics, and Latin, but was thorough. Tuition cost C$21 for three months, including room and board. This was not a large amount for the time; it enabled young men from modest backgrounds to attend, in addition to those whose families were wealthier.

Rockwood Academy soon acquired a reputation of being superior and having higher academic standards than the grammar schools of Canada West. In 1864 Wetherald sold the school to Donald McCaig and Alexander McMillan and accepted a position as superintendent of Haverford College near Philadelphia, Pennsylvania.

In 1871 McCaig left to become principal of Central School in Berlin, Ontario. McMillan continued at the academy until it closed in 1883. In the 1870s the Ontario government had created collegiate institutes to provide secondary education. These institutions were of sufficient quality to reduce demand for private schools in the area.

The original building was made of logs. In 1853 a three-storey stone building with a 2 1/2-storey annex was built to replace it. This building still stands. The campus also had a 2-acre (8,100 m^{2}) playground.

Alumni of the school include:

- James J. Hill, member of the Canadian Pacific Railway Syndicate and builder of the Great Northern Railway, who ascribed his success in large part due to his education at Rockwood,
- Arthur Sturgis Hardy, former Premier of Ontario,
- Sir Adam Beck, hydroelectric pioneer,
- Isaac Erb Bowman, Member of Provincial Parliament for Waterloo North,
- Henry Corby Jr., Member of Parliament for Hastings West, and Senator representing Belleville,

and several others.

== After the closure of the Academy ==
After the academy closed, the building remained, but it had fallen into disrepair by 1960, when Josef Drenters purchased it. He spent many years working on the restoration of the old stone building as well as a log barn and chapel on the property, as well as continuing his career as a sculptor. Drenters bequeathed the property to the Ontario Heritage Foundation under the condition that his family would still be able to live in it. The movie Agnes of God was filmed at the building. An Ontario historic plaque is located at the site of the building.

== Yosef Gertrudis Drenters (1930–1983) ==
The sudden death of Yosef Gertrudis Drenters in the winter of 1983 brought an early close to the career of a Canadian sculptor, artist and preservationist.

Born in 1930 in The Netherlands, his youth was spent in classical studies preparing for the priesthood. At the age of 14 he began to take drawing instructions from a local artist, Willem van Ejendhoven. Yosef was also influenced by his father, a skilled blacksmith, who was adept at making small works in forged iron.

In 1951 after giving up his monastic life, he came to Canada with his family, who first settled in British Columbia. His first years in Canada were spent working variously as a lumberjack, a rancher, a miner and a farmer. In 1954 the family moved to Ontario and purchased a large farm on Highway 24 north of Guelph, where in 1958 Yosef began experimenting in sculpture after several years of painting.

His first solo exhibition was organized by Florence Partridge, Chief Librarian of Massey Library at the Ontario Agricultural College. In 1960 his work was exhibited in Toronto at Dorothy Cameron's Here and Now gallery, and he was heralded by critics and collectors as a major Canadian sculptor. He received a Canada Council grant in 1961, was the subject of a CBC documentary film, and was accepted as a member of the Ontario Society of Artists.

The Canadian Department of Trade and Commerce commissioned him to create a sculpture for the Tokyo Trade Fair in 1965. His Pioneer Family won the competition for sculpture for the Ontario Pavilion at Expo 67, and he was commissioned as well to create a giant toy horse for La Ronde. In 1974, Drenters was made a member of the Royal Canadian Academy.

The Macdonald Stewart Art Centre in Guelph held the last exhibition of his work Images of the Madonna during the winter of 1982–1983 Many of his pieces continue to be displayed in public collections including the Agnes Etherington Art Centre in Kingston; the Art Gallery of Windsor, Edmonton Art Gallery, Hirshhorn Museum and Sculpture Garden, Smithsonian Institution, Princeton University Art Museum, Sarnia Public Library and Art Gallery, The University of Guelph, Wilfrid Laurier University and the Winnipeg Art Gallery.
