= John Best (Canadian politician) =

Canadian politician

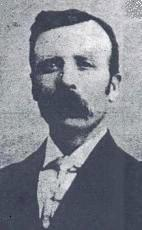

Member of the Canadian Parliament for Dufferin
- In office 1909–1921
- Preceded by: John Barr
- Succeeded by: Robert John Woods

Personal details
- Born: 11 July 1861 Geelong, Australia
- Died: 7 June 1923 (aged 62)
- Party: Conservative Party (1909–1917); Unionist Party (1917–1921); Conservative Party (1921–)
- Occupation: farmer

John Best (11 July 1861 in Geelong, Australia – 7 June 1923) was an Australian-born politician in Canada. He was acclaimed to the House of Commons of Canada, after the death of his predecessor John Barr, on 22 December 1909, as a member of the Conservative Party to represent the riding of Dufferin. He was re-elected in the 1911 election and was re-elected as a Unionist in 1917 then defeated in the 1921 election as a Conservative.
