= James Brown (Canadian politician) =

Canadian politician

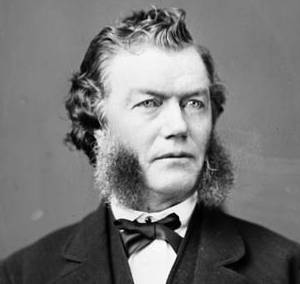
James Brown Source: Library and Archives Canada

James Brown (October 14, 1828 – April 24, 1897) was a Canadian businessman and politician. He represented Hastings West in the House of Commons of Canada as a Conservative member from 1867 to 1882.

He was born in Scotland in 1828 (1826 in some sources). He owned a company that manufactured iron agricultural implements in Belleville and served as the vice-president of the Belleville and North Hastings Railway. Brown also held the rank of lieutenant-colonel in the local militia, served as the mayor of Belleville in 1862 and 1863, and was a reeve for Hastings for six years. In 1861, he ran unsuccessfully for a seat in the assembly for the Province of Canada. Brown died in Belleville at the age of 68.
