= Henry Corby Jr. =

Canadian politician

The Honourable Henry Corby

Canadian Senator from Ontario
- In office 1912–1917
- Appointed by: Robert Borden

Member of Parliament for Hastings West
- In office 1888–1901
- Preceded by: Alexander Robertson
- Succeeded by: Edward Guss Porter

Personal details
- Born: May 2, 1851 Belleville, Canada West
- Died: April 23, 1917 (aged 65)
- Party: Conservative

Henry Corby (May 2, 1851 – April 23, 1917) was a Canadian businessman and politician. He represented Hastings West as a Conservative Member of Parliament (MP) from 1888 to 1901. Appointed to the Senate of Canada from Belleville, Ontario in 1912, he served until his death in office in 1917.

== Biography ==
He was born in Belleville, Canada West in 1851, the son of Henry Corby and Alma Williams, who married in England in 1832 before immigrating to Upper Canada. His father started a grocery and distillery. As a youth Corby attended school at the Rockwood Academy in Rockwood, Ontario.

He grew up in his father's business and, in 1881, took it over. The distillery later became part of Corby Distilleries. Corby contributed much to the city of Belleville: he donated funding to establish the public library, helped develop the park at Massassaga Point, and founded the Corby Charitable Fund. Corby also donated the land and funds to develop Corby Park.

In the late nineteenth century, Belleville was a major market town. Outlying farmers were hampered in getting their produce to market across the Bay of Quinte by the slow ferries. Corby joined with other major businessmen first, to establish a charter for a steam ferry in 1879. Next they began to raise money to build the first bridge across the Bay of Quinte; the swing bridge was started in 1887 and completed in 1891. The bridge was privately funded, and for decades the directors originally charged varying tolls to pedestrians and other users of the bridge.

In 1920 the City of Belleville, Hastings County, and Ontario provincial government together bought the bridge to operate as a public utility. The following year they dropped the tolls.

Along with his municipal activities, Corby became politically active. He was elected to Parliament representing Hastings West as a Conservative Party member, serving 1888 to 1901. He returned to his businesses but was later appointed to the Senate of Canada in 1912; he served until his death in office in 1917.
