= Robert Franklin Sutherland =

Canadian politician

The Hon. Robert Franklin Sutherland P.C.
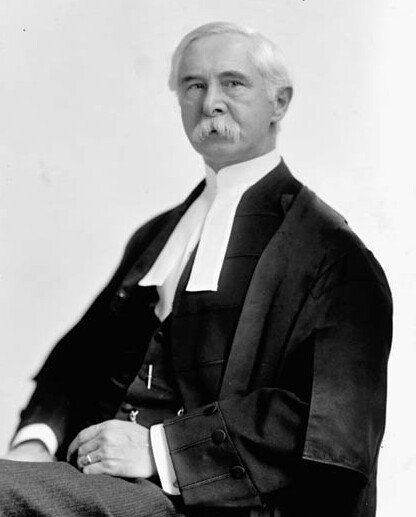

11th Speaker of the House of Commons of Canada
- In office January 11, 1905 – January 19, 1909
- Preceded by: Napoléon Belcourt
- Succeeded by: Charles Marcil

Member of the Canadian Parliament for Essex North
- In office 1900–1909
- Preceded by: William McGregor
- Succeeded by: Oliver James Wilcox

Personal details
- Born: April 5, 1859 Newmarket, Upper Canada
- Died: May 23, 1922 (aged 63) Toronto, Ontario, Canada
- Party: Liberal

Robert Franklin Sutherland, PC (April 5, 1859 – May 23, 1922) was a Canadian politician and Speaker of the House of Commons of Canada from 1905 to 1909, noted for his fine speaking ability and strong temperament.

== Biography ==
Sutherland was first elected to the House of Commons of Canada as a Liberal Member of Parliament for Essex North in the 1900 election. He was re-elected in the 1904 and 1908 elections.

He was born in Newmarket in Canada West in 1859. After studies at the University of Toronto and University of Western Ontario, Sutherland began his career as a lawyer in Windsor, Ontario. He was a member of the city council, and first ran for a seat in the House of Commons of Canada in 1900 and was elected. During the campaign in a riding with a large francophone and Catholic population, he was accused of having been a member of the anti-Catholic Protestant Protective Association. While he admitted having attended a meeting out of curiosity, he insisted that he refused to join the group upon learning of its anti-Catholic views. Once elected, he concentrated on constituency issues and obtaining grants for his riding.

By the time of the next general election in 1904, Sutherland had learned some French and was able to campaign in the language. Following the election, he was nominated by Sir Wilfrid Laurier to become Speaker of the House, and was the first anglophone Speaker to give part of his acceptance speech in French.

Laurier offered to renominate Sutherland for the Speakership following the 1908 election, but he declined, and was appointed the next year to a seat on Ontario's High Court. He became a respected judge and mediator.

He was later appointed to chair a Royal Commission in Ontario to investigate a proposal by Sir Adam Beck to establish a network of radial lines (that is, a system of inter-city streetcar lines). Sutherland's report argued against the scheme and it was not implemented.
