= Essex North (federal electoral district) =

Former federal electoral district in Ontario, Canada

Ontario electoral district

Defunct federal electoral district
- Legislature: House of Commons
- District created: 1882
- District abolished: 1924
- First contested: 1882
- Last contested: 1923 by-election

Essex North was a federal electoral district represented in the House of Commons of Canada from 1883 to 1925. It was located in the province of Ontario. This riding was created in 1882 when Essex riding was divided between Essex North and Essex South.

It initially consisted of the townships of West Sandwich, East Sandwich, Maidstone, Rochester and West Tilbury, the towns of Sandwich and Windsor, and the village of Belle River in the county of Essex.

In 1903, it was redefined to exclude the township of West Tilbury and include the township of Sandwich South, and the town of Walkerville.

In 1914, it was redefined to include the town of Objibway, and the village of Ford City.

The electoral district was abolished in 1924 when it was redistributed between Essex East and Essex West ridings.

== Members of Parliament ==
This riding has elected the following members of Parliament:

Parliament	Years	Member	Party
Riding created from Essex
5th	1882–1887	James Colebrooke Patterson	Conservative
6th	1887–1891	James Colebrooke Patterson	Conservative
7th	1891–1896	William McGregor	Liberal
8th	1896–1900	William McGregor	Liberal
9th	1900–1904	Robert Franklin Sutherland	Liberal
10th	1904–1908	Robert Franklin Sutherland	Liberal
11th	1908–1909	Robert Franklin Sutherland	Liberal
11th	1909–1911	Oliver James Wilcox	Conservative
12th	1911–1917	Oliver James Wilcox	Conservative
13th	1917–1921	William Costello Kennedy	Opposition (Laurier Liberals)
14th	1921–1921	William Costello Kennedy	Liberal
14th	1922–1923†	William Costello Kennedy	Liberal
14th	1923–1925	Albert Frederick Healy	Liberal
Riding dissolved into Essex East and Essex West

== Election results ==
1882 Canadian federal election
Party	Candidate	Votes
Conservative	James Colebrooke Patterson	1,714
Conservative	Joseph A. Kilroy	1,022

1887 Canadian federal election
Party	Candidate	Votes
Conservative	James Colebrooke Patterson	2,301
Liberal	Francis Cleary	2,165

1891 Canadian federal election
Party	Candidate	Votes
Liberal	William McGregor	2,892
Conservative	James Colebrooke Patterson	2,043

1896 Canadian federal election
Party	Candidate	Votes
Liberal	William McGregor	2,511
Conservative	Daniel Bpte. Odette	2,038
Patrons of Industry	Daniel Willis Mason	605
Independent	Alex McNeil	70

1900 Canadian federal election
Party	Candidate	Votes
Liberal	Robert Franklin Sutherland	3,046
Conservative	Solomon White	2,386

1904 Canadian federal election
Party	Candidate	Votes
Liberal	Robert Franklin Sutherland	3,037
Conservative	James Wesley Hanna	2,669

1908 Canadian federal election
Party	Candidate	Votes
Liberal	Robert Franklin Sutherland	3,227
Conservative	Oscar Ernest Fleming	2,726

On Mr. Sutherland's being named Justice of the High Court, Exchequer Division and Puisne Judge, High Court Division, Supreme Court of Canada, 21 October 1909:

By-election on 10 November 1909
Party	Candidate	Votes
Conservative	Oliver James Wilcox	2,463
Liberal	William J. McKee	2,379

1911 Canadian federal election
Party	Candidate	Votes
Conservative	Oliver James Wilcox	3,616
Liberal	Peter Anderson Dewar	3,440

1917 Canadian federal election
Party	Candidate	Votes
Opposition (Laurier Liberals)	William Costello Kennedy	7,164
Government (Unionist)	Ernest S. Wigle	6,718

1921 Canadian federal election
Party	Candidate	Votes
Liberal	William Costello Kennedy	14,176
Conservative	Harry James Neal	6,981

On Mr. Kennedy being named Minister of Railways and Canals, 29 December 1921:

By-election on 19 January 1922
Party	Candidate	Votes
Liberal	Hon. William Costello Kennedy	acclaimed

On Mr. Kennedy's death, 17 January 1923:

By-election on 1 March 1923
Party	Candidate	Votes
Liberal	Albert Frederick Healy	10,456
Conservative	Sidney Cecil Robinson	9,384

== See also ==
- List of Canadian electoral districts
- Historical federal electoral districts of Canada
