= Sharon Hayes =

Sharon Hayes may refer to:

- Sharon Hayes (politician)
- Sharon Hayes (artist)
