= Robert Milton Johnson =

Canadian politician

Member of Parliament for Moose Jaw
- In office December 1921 – February 1923
- Preceded by: James Alexander Calder
- Succeeded by: Edward Nicholas Hopkins

Personal details
- Born: Robert Milton Johnson; 26 January 1879 Collingwood Township, Ontario, Canada
- Died: 25 July 1943 (aged 64)
- Party: Progressive
- Profession: Farmer

Robert Milton Johnson (26 January 1879 – 25 July 1943) was a Progressive party member of the House of Commons of Canada. He was born in Collingwood Township, Ontario and became a farmer.

He was elected to Parliament at the Moose Jaw riding in the 1921 general election. During his term in Parliament, his election was annulled on 22 February 1923 and Johnson left the House of Commons. He made an unsuccessful attempt to win the Willow Bunch seat in the 1925 election. In the 1926 election, he returned to the Moose Jaw riding for another campaign but was also defeated. In the 1935 federal election, Johnson became the Social Credit party candidate for Moose Jaw, but drew the fewest votes of the riding.
