= William Costello Kennedy =

Canadian politician

The Honourable William Costello Kennedy PC

Member of the Canadian Parliament for Essex North
- In office 1917–1923
- Preceded by: Oliver James Wilcox
- Succeeded by: Albert Frederick Healy

Personal details
- Born: August 27, 1868 Ottawa, Ontario, Canada
- Died: January 17, 1923 (aged 54) Naples, Florida, United States
- Party: Liberal
- Cabinet: Minister of Railways and Canals (1921-1923)

William Costello Kennedy, PC (August 27, 1868 – January 17, 1923) was a Canadian politician.

Born in Ottawa, Ontario, he was first elected to the House of Commons of Canada in the riding of Essex North in the 1917 federal election as a Laurier-Liberal. He was re-elected as a Liberal in 1921. From 1921 until his death, he was the Minister of Railways and Canals in the government of William Lyon Mackenzie King.
