= Charles Edward Hanna =

Canadian politician

Member of Parliament for Hastings West
- In office November 1924 – September 1925
- Preceded by: Edward Guss Porter
- Succeeded by: riding dissolved

Personal details
- Born: Charles Edward Hanna; 17 May 1884 Belleville, Ontario
- Died: 10 October 1932 (aged 48)
- Party: Liberal
- Profession: merchant

Charles Edward Hanna (17 May 1884 – 10 October 1932) was a Liberal party member of the House of Commons of Canada. He was born in Belleville, Ontario and became a merchant in the hardware business.

Hanna was a municipal politician in Belleville, three years as an alderman and two years as mayor, and a member of the board of education.

He was elected to Parliament at the Hastings West riding in a by-election on 25 November 1924. After completing the remainder of the term of the 14th Canadian Parliament, Hanna sought re-election at Hastings South but was defeated by William Ernest Tummon of the Conservatives in the 1925 federal election. Hanna also made an unsuccessful campaign to unseat Tummon in the 1930 election.
