= West Queen's =

Former federal electoral district in Prince Edward Island, Canada

Prince Edward Island electoral district

Defunct federal electoral district
- Legislature: House of Commons
- District created: 1892
- District abolished: 1903
- First contested: 1896
- Last contested: By-election 1904

West Queen's was a federal electoral district in Prince Edward Island, Canada, that was represented in the House of Commons of Canada from 1896 to 1904. This riding was created in 1892 from parts of Queen's County riding. It was abolished in 1903 when it was merged into Queen's riding.

It consisted of the city of Charlottetown and the western part of Queen's County.

== Election results ==
1896 Canadian federal election
Party	Candidate	Votes
Liberal	Louis Henry Davies	1,985
Conservative	J.J. Jenkins	1,651

By-election: On Mr. Davies being appointed Minister of Marine and Fisheries, 11 July 1896

By-election on 30 July 1896
Party	Candidate	Votes
Liberal	Louis Henry Davies	acclaimed

1900 Canadian federal election
Party	Candidate	Votes
Liberal	Louis Henry Davies	2,528
Conservative	William S. Stewart	1,793

By-election: On Mr. Davies being appointed Puisne Judge, Supreme Court of Canada, 25 September 1901

By-election on 15 January 1902
Party	Candidate	Votes
Liberal	Donald Farquharson	2,108
Conservative	Angus Alexander McLean	1,633

By-election: On Mr. Farquharson's death, 26 June 1903

By-election on 16 February 1904
Party	Candidate	Votes
Liberal	Horace Haszard	2,190
Conservative	Angus Alexander McLean	1,879

== See also ==
- List of Canadian electoral districts
- Historical federal electoral districts of Canada
