= Edward Guss Porter =

Canadian politician

Edward Guss Porter K.C.
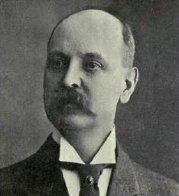

Member of the Canadian Parliament for Hastings West
- In office 1902–1924
- Preceded by: Henry Corby, Jr.
- Succeeded by: Charles Edward Hanna

Personal details
- Born: 28 May 1859 Consecon, Canada West
- Died: 23 December 1929 (aged 70)
- Party: Conservative

Edward Guss Porter (28 May 1859 – 23 December 1929) was a Canadian politician.

Born in Consecon, Prince Edward County, Canada West, the son of Robert and Hannah Porter, Porter was educated at Albert College. A lawyer, he was head of the firm Butler and Payne of Belleville, Ontario, he was a Belleville alderman for five years and Mayor of the City of Belleville, Ontario in 1891. He was elected to the Canadian House of Commons for the electoral district of Hastings West in a 1902 by-election, after the sitting MP, Henry Corby, resigned. A Conservative, he was re-elected in the following six federal elections. He resigned from parliament in 1924 in order to force a by-election as a protest against Murdock-Home Bank but was defeated. He died on 23 December 1929 and was buried in the Belleville Cemetery.
