= Oliver James Wilcox =

Canadian politician

Oliver James Wilcox (September 1, 1869 – December 2, 1917) was a farmer and political figure in Ontario, Canada. He represented Essex North in the House of Commons of Canada from 1909 to 1917 as a Conservative.

He was born in South Woodslee, Ontario, the son of John Wilcox and Mary Totten. In 1892, he married Mary Rachel Hamilton. Wilcox was reeve of Rochester Township. He served as president of North Essex Farmers Insurance Company. He was first elected to the House of Commons in a 1909 by-election held after Robert Franklin Sutherland was named to the Supreme Court of Ontario; he was reelected in 1911. Wilcox died in Essex while still in office, two weeks before the 1917 general election, at the age of 48.
