= Albert Frederick Healy =

Canadian politician

Member of Parliament for Essex North
- In office March 1923 – September 1925
- Preceded by: William Costello Kennedy
- Succeeded by: riding dissolved

Personal details
- Born: Albert Frederick Healy; 8 August 1873 Adelaide, Ontario
- Died: 7 March 1944 (aged 70) San Diego, California
- Party: Liberal
- Profession: lawyer

Albert Frederick Healy (8 August 1873 – 7 March 1944) was a Canadian lawyer and politician. Healy was a Liberal party member of the House of Commons of Canada. He was born in Adelaide, Ontario and became a lawyer.

He was first elected to Parliament at the Essex North riding in a by-election on 1 March 1923. After serving for the remainder of the term in the 14th Canadian Parliament, Healy left the House of Commons and did not seek another term in the 1925 general election. He died on 7 March 1944 in San Diego, California.
