= Horace Haszard =

Canadian politician

Horace Haszard (November 2, 1853 – May 11, 1922) was a Canadian wholesale merchant and political figure in Prince Edward Island, Canada. He represented West Queen's in the House of Commons of Canada in 1904 as a Liberal member.

He was born in Charlottetown, Prince Edward Island, the son of Henry Haszard and Hannah Catherine Cameron. He was educated there and worked for a time as a clerk for a wholesale dry goods firm in Montreal. Haszard returned to Charlottetown in 1873, where he entered business as a broker, insurance agent and manufacturer's representative. Haszard served on the Charlottetown City Council from 1885 to 1886 and from 1894 to 1895.
