= Robert John Woods =

Canadian politician and farmer

Member of the House of Commons for Dufferin
- In office 1921–1925

Personal details
- Born: 7 January 1859 Gorrie, Canada West
- Died: 19 June 1944 (aged 85)
- Party: Progressive

Robert John Woods (7 January 1859 – 19 June 1944) was a Canadian farmer and political figure. He represented Dufferin in the House of Commons of Canada as a Progressive member from 1921 to 1925.

Woods was born in Gorrie, Huron County, Canada West, and later moved to Carrick Township in Bruce County with his family. He purchased a farm in Melancthon Township in Dufferin County, where he served on the township council and later became reeve. Woods ran unsuccessfully for a seat in the provincial assembly in 1907 and 1908 as a Temperance Conservative. He was defeated in his bid for reelection in 1925. In 1937, he moved near Guelph.
