= Hastings West (federal electoral district) =

Former federal electoral district in Ontario, Canada

Ontario electoral district

Defunct federal electoral district
- Legislature: House of Commons
- District created: 1867
- District abolished: 1924
- First contested: 1867
- Last contested: 1924 by-election

Hastings West was a federal electoral district in the province of Ontario, Canada, that was represented in the House of Commons of Canada from 1867 to 1925. It was created by the British North America Act 1867 which divided the County of Hastings, divided into three ridings: Hastings West, Hastings East and Hastings North.

The West Riding consisted of the Town of Belleville, the Township of Sydney, and the Village of Trenton.

In 1903, the county of Hastings was divided into two ridings: Hastings West and Hastings East.

The west riding consisted of the townships of Sydney, Rawdon, Huntingdon, Marmora and Lake, Wollaston, Faraday, Herschel, McClure, Wicklow and Bangor, the city of Belleville, the town of Trenton, and the villages of Marmora and Sterling.

The electoral district was abolished in 1924 when it was redistributed between Hastings South and Hastings—Peterborough ridings.

== Members of Parliament ==
This riding has elected the following members of Parliament:

Parliament	Years	Member	Party
1st	1867–1872	James Brown	Conservative
2nd	1872–1874	James Brown	Conservative
3rd	1874–1878	James Brown	Conservative
4th	1878–1882	James Brown	Conservative
5th	1882–1887	Alexander Robertson	Conservative
6th	1887–1888	Alexander Robertson	Conservative
6th	1888–1891	Henry Corby Jr.	Conservative
7th	1891–1894	Henry Corby Jr.	Conservative
7th	1894–1896	Henry Corby Jr.	Conservative
8th	1896–1900	Henry Corby Jr.	Conservative
9th	1900–1901	Henry Corby Jr.	Conservative
9th	1902–1904	Edward Guss Porter	Conservative
10th	1904–1908	Edward Guss Porter	Conservative
11th	1908–1911	Edward Guss Porter	Conservative
12th	1911–1917	Edward Guss Porter	Conservative
13th	1917–1921	Edward Guss Porter	Government (Unionist)
14th	1921–1924	Edward Guss Porter	Conservative
14th	1924–1925	Charles Edward Hanna	Liberal
Riding dissolved into Hastings South and Hastings—Peterborough

== Election results ==
1867 Canadian federal election
Party	Candidate	Votes
Conservative	James Brown	773
Liberal	Rufus Holden	313
Eligible voters		2,264
Source: Canadian Parliamentary Guide, 1871

1872 Canadian federal election
Party	Candidate	Votes
Conservative	James Brown	1,030
Liberal	Reuben Patterson	575

1874 Canadian federal election
Party	Candidate	Votes
Conservative	James Brown	414
Conservative	Thomas Wills	49

1878 Canadian federal election
Party	Candidate	Votes
Conservative	James Brown	1,306
Conservative	Lewis Wallbridge	1,055

1882 Canadian federal election
Party	Candidate	Votes
Conservative	Alexander Robertson	1,317
Conservative	James Brown	1,081

1887 Canadian federal election
Party	Candidate	Votes
Conservative	Alexander Robertson	1,728
Liberal	John G. Frost	1,550

On Mr. Robertson's death, 29 February 1888:

By-election on 17 March 1888
Party	Candidate	Votes
Conservative	Henry A. Corby	acclaimed

1891 Canadian federal election
Party	Candidate	Votes
Conservative	Henry Corby	1,955
Liberal	R. C. Clute	1,595

On Mr. Corby's resignation, 22 June 1894:

By-election on 4 July 1894
Party	Candidate	Votes
Conservative	Henry A. Corby	acclaimed

1896 Canadian federal election
Party	Candidate	Votes
Conservative	H. Corby	1,836
Liberal	Thomas Ritchie	1,591

1900 Canadian federal election
Party	Candidate	Votes
Conservative	Henry Corby	2,094
Liberal	Stephen Johnston Young	1,252

On Mr. Corby's resignation, 28 February 1901:

By-election on 15 January 1902
Party	Candidate	Votes
Conservative	E. G. Porter	1,831
Liberal	J. G. Frost	1,330

1904 Canadian federal election
Party	Candidate	Votes
Conservative	E. Guss Porter	3,240
Liberal	Byron O. Lott	2,361

1908 Canadian federal election
Party	Candidate	Votes
Conservative	Edward Guss Porter	3,360
Liberal	Jesse Funnell	2,199

1911 Canadian federal election
Party	Candidate	Votes
Conservative	Edward Guss Porter	3,623
Liberal	William Henry Hubbell	1,852

1917 Canadian federal election
Party	Candidate	Votes
Government (Unionist)	Edward Guss Porter	5,710
Opposition (Laurier Liberals)	Robert James Graham	4,085

1921 Canadian federal election
Party	Candidate	Votes
Conservative	Edward Guss Porter	7,279
Progressive	Arza Daniel McIntosh	6,108

On Mr. Porter's resignation, 28 June 1924:

By-election on 25 November 1924
Party	Candidate	Votes
Liberal	Charles Edward Hanna	8,315
Conservative	E. G. Porter	7,901

== See also ==
- List of Canadian electoral districts
- Historical federal electoral districts of Canada
