= Edward Nicholas Hopkins =

Canadian politician

Edward Nicholas Hopkins (October 3, 1854 – July 14, 1935) was a Canadian farmer, manufacturer and political figure in Saskatchewan, Canada. He represented Moose Jaw in the House of Commons of Canada from 1923 to 1925 as a Progressive Party member.

He was born in Brownsville, Canada West (present-day Ontario), the son of Benjamin Hopkins, an Irish immigrant, and Margaret Loucks. He worked on the family farm until he was 14 and then was employed in cheese production. Hopkins came west in 1882, settling on land near Moose Jaw. He was president of the Grain Growers Association and of the Dairymen's Association of the Northwest Territories. Hopkins married Minnie Latham in 1889. She had migrated to Moose Jaw with her parents from England six years earlier. Hopkins was first elected to the House of Commons in a 1923 by-election. He was defeated when he ran for reelection in 1925. Moose Jaw's restaurant Hopkins Dining Parlour is named after him.
