= 1908 Canadian federal election =

- October 26, 1908

221 seats in the House of Commons 111 seats needed for a majority
- Turnout: 70.3% (▼1.3 pp)
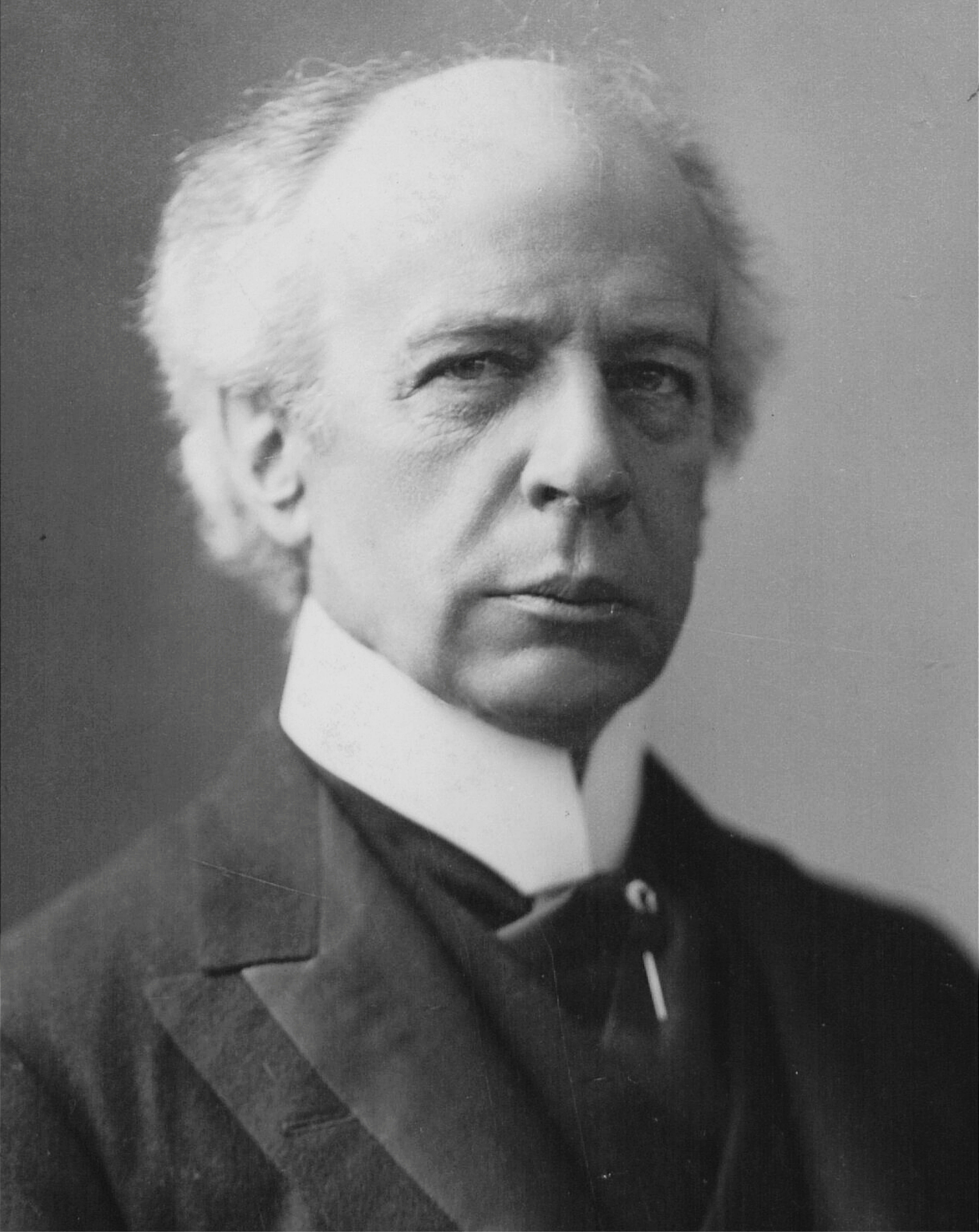

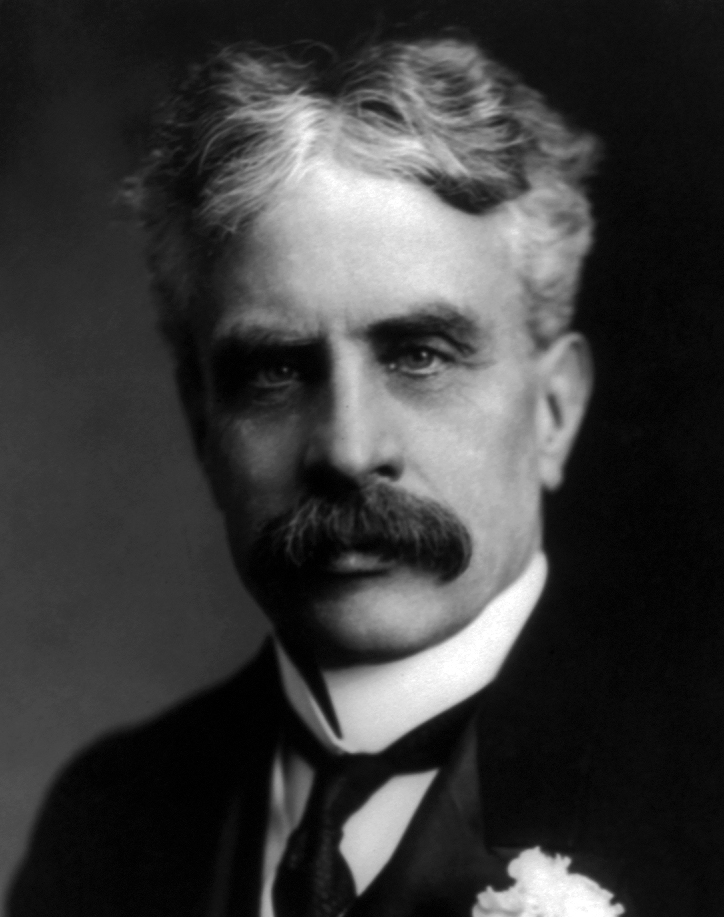
	First party	Second party
Leader	Wilfrid Laurier	Robert Borden
Party	Liberal	Conservative
Leader since	June 2, 1887	February 6, 1901
Leader's seat	Quebec East (Note: Laurier was also elected in Ottawa (City of); he chose to sit for Quebec East instead, and resigned as the Member of Parliament for Ottawa (City of).)	Halifax (Note: Borden was also elected in Carleton, which he represented during the previous Parliament; he chose to sit for Halifax instead, and resigned as the Member of Parliament for Carleton.)
Last election	137 seats, 50.9%	75 seats, 45.9%
Seats won	133	85
Seat change	▼4	▲10
Popular vote	570,311	539,374
Percentage	48.9%	46.2%
Swing	▼2.0 pp	▲0.3 pp

- The Canadian parliament after the 1908 election
Prime Minister before election
Wilfrid Laurier
Liberal
Prime Minister after election
Wilfrid Laurier
Liberal

The 1908 Canadian federal election was held on Monday October 26, 1908 to elect members of the House of Commons of Canada of the 11th Parliament of Canada. Prime Minister Sir Wilfrid Laurier's Liberal Party of Canada was re-elected for a fourth consecutive term in government with a majority government. The Liberals lost four seats and a small share of the popular vote.

Sir Robert Borden's Conservatives and Liberal-Conservatives won ten additional seats.

This was the first election following the creation of the provinces of Alberta and Saskatchewan. Following their creation in 1905, the two new provinces continued to be represented by MPs initially elected under the old Northwest Territories riding boundaries, some of which straddled the new provincial border. The remainder of the Northwest Territories that previously had Parliamentary representation lost it, although parts of the NWT would gain or regain representation after being added to Manitoba, Ontario and Quebec in 1912. A seat would not be created for the NWT itself again (which then contained the modern NWT and Nunavut) until 1949.

This election was the last time a prime minister managed to retain power into a fourth consecutive term.

== Electoral system ==
Most of the ridings elected one member through first post the post voting. But Halifax and Queen's (PEI) each elected two MPs through plurality block voting.

== National results ==

Party	Party leader	# of candidates	Seats			Popular vote		
Party	Party leader	# of candidates	1904	Elected	Change	#	%	Change
Liberal	Wilfrid Laurier	213	137	133	-2.9%	570,311	48.87%	-2.01pp
Conservative	Robert Borden	207	70	82	+17.1%	524,641	44.95%	+0.55pp
Liberal-Conservative	Robert Borden	4	5	3	-40.0%	14,733	1.26%	-0.27pp
Independent		15	1	1	-	16,903	1.45%	+0.45pp
Labour		3	-	1		10,400	0.89%	+0.68pp
Unknown		7	-	-	-	13,478	1.15%	+0.02pp
Socialist		5	-	-	-	6,071	0.52%	+0.35pp
Independent Conservative		2	1	1	-100%	5,314	0.46%	-0.04pp
Independent Liberal		5	-	-	-	5,191	0.44%	+0.41pp
Total		461	214	221	+2.8%	1,167,042	100%	
Sources: http://www.elections.ca -- History of Federal Ridings since 1867

== Results by province ==
Party		BC	AB	SK	MB	ON	QC	NB	NS	PE	YK	Total
Liberal	Seats:	2	4	9	2	37	52	11	12	3	1	133
Liberal	Popular vote (%):	35.9	50.2	56.6	45.4	45.0	53.0	56.2	51.0	50.4	40.2	48.9
Conservative	Seats:	5	2	1	8	46	12	2	5	1	-	82
Conservative	Vote (%):	46.8	38.1	36.8	51.5	49.2	39.5	43.8	44.5	49.6	10.8	45.0
Liberal-Conservative	Seats:		1			1			1			3
Liberal-Conservative	Vote (%):		6.4			1.5			4.5			1.3
Independent	Seats:	-	-	-	-	1	-					1
Independent	Vote (%):	8.9	3.7	0.6	0.1	1.8	1.1					1.5
Labour	Seats:					-	1					1
Labour	Vote (%):					0.7	2.6					0.9
Independent Conservative	Seats:			-		1						1
Independent Conservative	Vote (%):			5.9		0.4						0.5
Total seats		7	7	10	10	86	65	13	18	4	1	221
Parties that won no seats:
Unknown	Vote (%):	1.3				1.4	1.9				49.0	1.2
Socialist	Vote (%):	7.1	1.6		2.9	0.2						0.5
Independent Liberal	Vote (%):			0.1			1.8					0.4

== See also ==
- List of Canadian federal general elections
- List of political parties in Canada
- 11th Canadian Parliament
