= James Bonfield =

Canadian politician

Ontario MPP
- In office 1875–1883
- Preceded by: Eric Harrington
- Succeeded by: John Francis Dowling
- Constituency: Renfrew South

Personal details
- Born: 1825 Gortmore, County Tipperary, Ireland
- Died: 1883 (aged 57–58) Toronto, Ontario
- Party: Liberal
- Spouse: Catherine Tracy
- Occupation: Lumber merchant

James Bonfield (1825 – January 29, 1883) was an Ontario merchant and political figure. He represented Renfrew South in the Legislative Assembly of Ontario from 1875 to 1883 as a Liberal member.

He was born in Gortmore, County Tipperary, Ireland in 1825, the son of John Bonfield, and came to Canada in 1848. He worked as a clerk for lumber merchant John Egan, later opened his own general store and afterwards became a lumber merchant in Eganville. He served as reeve for Grattan Township. In 1854, he married Catherine Tracy.

He died in office shortly before the 1883 provincial election, and was succeeded by his son-in-law John Francis Dowling.

The Township of Bonfield, Ontario was named in his honour.

== Family ties ==
His daughter Elizabeth married John Francis Dowling who succeeded Bonfield as the member for Renfrew South in the provincial assembly.

Another daughter Margaret married Martin James Maloney, who represented Renfrew South in the House of Commons as a Conservative from 1925 to 1935.

One of Bonfield's grandson from Margaret, James Anthony Maloney, occupied Bonfield's Renfrew South seat in the legislature from 1956 to 1961 as a Progressive Conservative and served as Minister of Mines in the cabinet of Leslie Frost. James died in office like his grandfather, almost eight years later.

Another son of Margaret Arthur Maloney was the Progressive Conservative MP for Parkdale from 1952 to 1962, and in 1975 appointed the inaugural Ontario Ombudsman.

== Electoral history ==
1875 Ontario general election: Renfrew South
Party	Candidate	Votes
Liberal	James Bonfield	Acclaimed
Source: Elections Ontario

1879 Ontario general election: Renfrew South
Party	Candidate	Votes	%
Liberal	James Bonfield	837	54.28
Conservative	Eric Harrington	705	45.72
Total valid votes		1,542	67.72
Eligible voters		2,277	
Liberal hold			
Source: Elections Ontario
