= John McAndrew =

John McAndrew may refer to:

- John McAndrew (Gaelic footballer)
- John McAndrew (cricketer)
- John Alfred McAndrew, Ontario lawyer and political figure
