= Yakabuski =

Yakabuski is a surname. Notable people with the surname include:

- John Yakabuski (born 1957), Canadian politician
- Paul Yakabuski (1922–1987), Canadian politician
