= Aaron Abel Wright =

Canadian politician

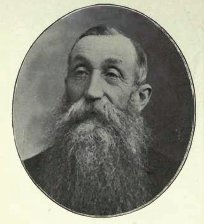

Member of Parliament for Renfrew South
- In office 1900–1908
- Preceded by: John Ferguson
- Succeeded by: Thomas Andrew Low

Personal details
- Born: June 6, 1840 Athens, Leeds County, Upper Canada
- Died: February 23, 1922 (aged 81) Renfrew, Ontario
- Party: Liberal
- Occupation: Merchant

Aaron Abel Wright (June 6, 1840 – February 23, 1922) was a Canadian politician.

== Biography ==
Born in Athens, Leeds County, Upper Canada, the son of Israel Wright and Fanny Stevens, he educated at the High School in Athens and at the Toronto Normal School. A merchant and President and Managing Director of the Renfrew Electric Company, Wrights was elected to the House of Commons of Canada for Renfrew South in the 1900 federal election. A Liberal, he was re-elected in the 1904 federal election. A Baptist, he married Jane Harvey on October 26, 1871.
