= Thomas Low =

Thomas Low may refer to:

- Tommy Low (1874–?), Scottish footballer
- Thomas Andrew Low (1871–1931), Canadian industrialist and politician
