= James O'Reilly (Canadian politician) =

Canadian politician

James O'Reilly, QC (September 16, 1823 – May 15, 1875) was a Canadian lawyer and politician who represented Renfrew South in the House of Commons of Canada from 1872 to 1874.

He was born in Westport, County Mayo, Ireland, the son of Peter O'Reilly, and came to Upper Canada in 1832 with his father. O'Reilly studied law with C. O. Benson in Belleville and later with John Willoughby Crawford.

He was called to the Ontario bar in 1847 and set up practice in Kingston. In 1850, he married Mary Jane Redmond. He was named a Queen's Counsel in 1864 and was later called to the Quebec bar. O'Reilly prosecuted Patrick James Whelan who was convicted for the assassination of D'Arcy McGee and hanged.

He served on Kingston City Council as a municipal councillor from 1850 to 1855, was the city's Recorder from 1864 to 1869 and also was a director of the Kingston and Pembroke Railway. O'Reilly commanded a company of volunteer militia, reaching the rank of major. He died in Kingston, aged 51.
