= John Ferguson (Canadian politician) =

Canadian politician

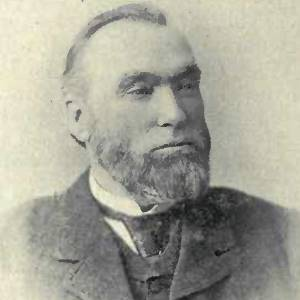
John Ferguson

John Ferguson (April 17, 1840 – July 7, 1908) was a Scottish-born farmer, lumberman and political figure in Ontario, Canada. He represented Renfrew South in the House of Commons of Canada from 1887 to 1900 as an Independent Conservative member.

He was born in Granart, Argyleshire, the son of Archibald Ferguson and Margaret Barr, and came to Canada West with his family in 1847, settling in Admaston. He was married three times: to a Miss Bremner around 1862, to Jessie Mackenzie in 1877 and to Margaret Bedington in 1890. Ferguson was defeated in the 1887 federal election but was elected in a by-election held later that year following the death of Robert Campbell. He was unsuccessful when he ran for reelection to the House of Commons in 1900. Around 1888, Ferguson became an agent for lumber baron J.R. Booth.
