= Renfrew South (federal electoral district) =

Former federal electoral district in Ontario, Canada

Ontario electoral district

Defunct federal electoral district
- Legislature: House of Commons
- District created: 1867
- District abolished: 1966
- First contested: 1867
- Last contested: 1965

Renfrew South was a federal riding represented in the House of Commons of Canada from 1867 to 1968. It was located in the province of Ontario. The federal riding was created by the British North America Act 1867 and was abolished in 1966, with the riding being apportioned into Frontenac—Lennox and Addington, Lanark and Renfrew, and Renfrew North.

== Riding history ==
The South Riding initially consisted of the townships of McNab, Bagot, Blithfield, Brougham, Horton, Adamston, Grattan, Matawatchan, Griffith, Lyndoch, Raglan, Radcliffe, Brudenell, Sebastopol, and the villages of Arnprior and Renfrew.

In 1872, the townships of Hagarty, Richards, Sherwood, Burns and Renfrew, Jones, were added to the South Riding.

In 1892, the part of the village of Eganville south of the River Bonnechère was added to the riding.

In 1924, "Renfrew South" was defined to consist of the part of the county of Renfrew lying south of and including the townships of Richards, Haggarty, Brudenell, Sebastopol, Grattan, Admaston and Horton, and including the part of the village of Eganville that lies in the township of Grattan.

In 1952, it was defined to consist of the part of the county of Renfrew lying south and west of and including the townships of Richards, Hagarty, Algoma South, Grattan, Admaston and Horton, the part of the village of Eganville lying within the township of Grattan, and, in the territorial district of Nipissing, the townships of Airy, Murchison, Dickens, Sabine, and Lyell.

The electoral district was abolished in 1966 when it was redistributed between Frontenac—Lennox and Addington, Lanark and Renfrew and Renfrew North ridings.

== Members of Parliament ==
This riding elected the following members of the House of Commons of Canada:

Parliament	Years	Member	Party
1st	1867–1869	Daniel McLachlin	Liberal
1st	1869–1872	John Lorn McDougall	Liberal
2nd	1872–1874	James O'Reilly	Liberal–Conservative
3rd	1874–1874	John Lorn McDougall	Liberal
3rd	1874–1875	John Lorn McDougall	Liberal
3rd	1875–1878	John Lorn McDougall	Liberal
4th	1878–1882	William Bannerman	Conservative
5th	1882–1887	Robert Campbell	Liberal
6th	1887–1887†	Robert Campbell	Liberal
6th	1887–1891	John Ferguson	Independent Conservative
7th	1891–1896	John Ferguson	Independent Conservative
8th	1896–1900	John Ferguson	Independent Conservative
9th	1900–1904	Aaron Abel Wright	Liberal
10th	1904–1908	Aaron Abel Wright	Liberal
11th	1908–1911	Thomas Andrew Low	Liberal
12th	1911–1912	Thomas Andrew Low	Liberal
12th	1912–1917	George Perry Graham	Liberal
13th	1917–1921	Isaac Ellis Pedlow	Opposition (Laurier Liberals)
14th	1921–1923	Thomas Andrew Low	Liberal
14th	1923–1925	Thomas Andrew Low	Liberal
15th	1925–1926	Martin James Maloney	Conservative
16th	1926–1930	Martin James Maloney	Conservative
17th	1930–1935	Martin James Maloney	Conservative
18th	1935–1940	James Joseph McCann	Liberal
19th	1940–1945	James Joseph McCann	Liberal
20th	1945–1949	James Joseph McCann	Liberal
21st	1949–1953	James Joseph McCann	Liberal
22nd	1953–1957	James Joseph McCann	Liberal
23rd	1957–1958	James William Baskin	Progressive Conservative
24th	1958–1962	James William Baskin	Progressive Conservative
25th	1962–1963	James William Baskin	Progressive Conservative
26th	1963–1965	Joe Greene	Liberal
27th	1965–1968	Joe Greene	Liberal
Riding dissolved into Lanark and Renfrew, Renfrew North and Frontenac—Lennox and Addington

== Election results ==
1867 Canadian federal election: South Riding of Renfrew
Party	Candidate	Votes
Liberal	Daniel McLachlin	acclaimed

By-election: On Mr. McLachlin's resignation, 12 July 1869: South Riding of Renfrew
Party	Candidate	Votes
Liberal	John Lorn McDougall	482
Liberal	Malcolm Cameron	264

1872 Canadian federal election: South Riding of Renfrew
Party	Candidate	Votes
Liberal-Conservative	James O'Reilly	916
Liberal	John Lorn McDougall	645

1874 Canadian federal election: South Riding of Renfrew
Party	Candidate	Votes
Liberal	John Lorn McDougall	738
Conservative	William Bannerman	668

By-election: On Mr. McDougall being unseated on petition, 24 October 1874: South Riding of Renfrew
Party	Candidate	Votes
Liberal	John Lorn McDougall	acclaimed

By-election: On Mr. McDougall being unseated on petition, 20 February 1875: South Riding of Renfrew
Party	Candidate	Votes
Liberal	John Lorn McDougall	803
Conservative	William Bannerman	748

1878 Canadian federal election: South Riding of Renfrew
Party	Candidate	Votes
Conservative	William Bannerman	962
Unknown	Robert Campbell	738

1882 Canadian federal election: South Riding of Renfrew
Party	Candidate	Votes
Liberal	Robert Campbell	913
Conservative	William Bannerman	759

1887 Canadian federal election: South Riding of Renfrew
Party	Candidate	Votes
Liberal	Robert Campbell	1,200
Independent Conservative	John Ferguson	1,134

By-election: On Mr. Campbell's death, 2 August 1887: South Riding of Renfrew
Party	Candidate	Votes
Independent Conservative	John Ferguson	1,299
Unknown	Duncan McIntyre	1,177

1891 Canadian federal election: South Riding of Renfrew
Party	Candidate	Votes
Independent Conservative	John Ferguson	1,642
Liberal	David Barr	1,198

1896 Canadian federal election: South Riding of Renfrew
Party	Candidate	Votes
Independent Conservative	John Ferguson	1,846
Patrons of Industry	Robert A. Jamieson	1,424

1900 Canadian federal election: South Riding of Renfrew
Party	Candidate	Votes
Liberal	Aaron Abel Wright	2,149
Independent Conservative	John Ferguson	1,796

1904 Canadian federal election: South Riding of Renfrew
Party	Candidate	Votes
Liberal	Aaron Abel Wright	2,168
Conservative	John McKay	1,980

1908 Canadian federal election: South Riding of Renfrew
Party	Candidate	Votes
Liberal	Thomas Andrew Low	2,721
Conservative	John MacKay	2,031

1911 Canadian federal election: South Riding of Renfrew
Party	Candidate	Votes
Liberal	Thomas Andrew Low	2,687
Conservative	Martin James Maloney	2,068

By-election: On Mr. Low's resignation, 22 February 1912: South Riding of Renfrew
Party	Candidate	Votes
Liberal	George Perry Graham	2,421
Conservative	M. J. Maloney	2,198

1917 Canadian federal election: South Riding of Renfrew
Party	Candidate	Votes
Opposition (Laurier Liberals)	Isaac Ellis Pedlow	3,256
Government (Unionist)	Lawrence Thomas Martin	3,182

1921 Canadian federal election: South Riding of Renfrew
Party	Candidate	Votes
Liberal	Thomas Andrew Low	4,083
Conservative	Robert George Wilson	2,675
Labour	John Henry Findlay	2,432
Progressive	Martin James Maloney	2,229

By-election: Acceptance by the Honourable Thomas Andrew Low of an office of emolument under the Crown, 6 September 1923: South Riding of Renfrew
Party	Candidate	Votes
Liberal	Thomas Andrew Low	acclaimed

1925 Canadian federal election: Renfrew South
Party	Candidate	Votes
Conservative	Martin James Maloney	6,336
Liberal	Thomas Andrew Low	4,925

1926 Canadian federal election: Renfrew South
Party	Candidate	Votes
Conservative	Martin James Maloney	5,207
Liberal	Joseph Lawrence Murray	4,986
Progressive	John F. Gibbons	1,823

1930 Canadian federal election: Renfrew South
Party	Candidate	Votes
Conservative	Martin James Maloney	6,404
Liberal	Thomas Andrew Low	6,144

1935 Canadian federal election: Renfrew South
Party	Candidate	Votes
Liberal	James Joseph McCann	6,054
Conservative	Martin James Maloney	3,440
Reconstruction	James P. Morrison	2,395

1940 Canadian federal election: Renfrew South
Party	Candidate	Votes
Liberal	James Joseph McCann	6,228
Conservative	Martin James Maloney	5,236

1945 Canadian federal election: Renfrew South
Party	Candidate	Votes
Liberal	James Joseph McCann	7,182
National Government	James Anthony Maloney	4,872
Co-operative Commonwealth	John Clifford McManus	835

1949 Canadian federal election: Renfrew South
Party	Candidate	Votes
Liberal	James Joseph McCann	7,909
Progressive Conservative	Allan Alexander McLean	6,412
Co-operative Commonwealth	John Clifford McManus	486

1953 Canadian federal election: Renfrew South
Party	Candidate	Votes
Liberal	James Joseph McCann	8,627
Progressive Conservative	Allan Alexander McLean	6,395
Co-operative Commonwealth	George Calver	382

1957 Canadian federal election: Renfrew South
Party	Candidate	Votes
Progressive Conservative	James William Baskin	8,782
Liberal	James Joseph McCann	7,791

1958 Canadian federal election: Renfrew South
Party	Candidate	Votes
Progressive Conservative	James William Baskin	9,259
Liberal	D. Wallace Stewart	8,148

1962 Canadian federal election: Renfrew South
Party	Candidate	Votes
Progressive Conservative	James William Baskin	8,732
Liberal	Murray Joseph Daly	8,254
New Democratic	Leonard Laventure	427
Social Credit	William John Slater	246

1963 Canadian federal election: Renfrew South
Party	Candidate	Votes
Liberal	Joe Greene	8,765
Progressive Conservative	James William Baskin	8,210
Social Credit	Leonard Eric Welk	393
New Democratic	Ernest Henry Briginshaw	316

1965 Canadian federal election: Renfrew South
Party	Candidate	Votes
Liberal	Joe Greene	8,932
Progressive Conservative	James William Baskin	7,505
New Democratic	Earl McDonald	581

== See also ==
- List of Canadian electoral districts
- Historical federal electoral districts of Canada
