= Harold Timmins =

Canadian politician

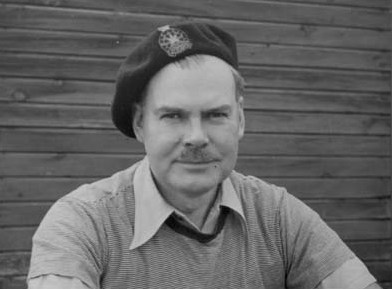
- Timmins between 1939 and 1945.

Member of Parliament for Parkdale
- In office October 1946 – June 1949
- Preceded by: Herbert Alexander Bruce
- Succeeded by: John Hunter

Personal details
- Born: Harold Aberdeen Watson Timmins; April 14, 1896 Alliston, Ontario
- Died: July 29, 1966 (aged 70) Long Point, Balsam Lake, Ontario
- Party: Progressive Conservative
- Spouse: Amy M. Fleming
- Profession: Lawyer, lecturer, judge

Harold Aberdeen Watson Timmins (April 14, 1895 – July 29, 1966) was a Canadian politician and jurist.

Timmins was born in Alliston, Ontario, the son of James S. Timmins and Charlotte Amelia Watson, and raised in the Toronto neighbourhood of Parkdale where he attended Parkdale Collegiate Institute before studying at the University of Toronto and Osgoode Hall Law School. He was called to the Ontario bar in 1920. Timmins was named a King's Counsel in 1942.

He served with the Canadian Army as a gunner during World War I and was wounded at the Battle of Arras.

A lawyer by profession who also lectured at Osgoode Hall Law School on contract law and liens, Timmins was a popular alderman on Toronto City Council representing Parkdale's Ward Six from 1944 until 1946 when he ran in a federal by-election in Parkdale. He was elected as a Progressive Conservative MP and sat in the House of Commons of Canada until his defeat in the 1949 federal election by John Hunter of the Liberals in what was considered an upset victory as Parkdale had been a safe Tory seat since its creation in the 1917 federal election.

During his time in the House of Commons, Timmins was an advocate for building housing for veteran's and for the creation of a national health plan.

In 1958, Timmins was appointed as a judge on the County Court of York. Prior to that he'd been a magistrate-at-large in Ontario and an official arbitrator for Toronto for three years.
