= Thomas Moore Costello =

Canadian politician

Ontario MPP
- In office 1926–1929
- Preceded by: John Carty
- Succeeded by: Thomas Patrick Murray
- Constituency: Renfrew South

Personal details
- Born: April 27, 1883; Brudenell, Renfrew County, Ontario
- Died: October 29, 1954 (aged 71) near Bothwell, Ontario
- Political party: Progressive Conservative Party of Ontario
- Spouse: Mae McKay
- Profession: Lawyer

Thomas Moore Costello (April 27, 1883 – October 29, 1954) was a lawyer, judge and political figure in Ontario. He represented Renfrew Southin the Legislative Assembly of Ontario from 1926 to 1929 as a Conservative member.

He was born in Brudenell, Renfrew County in 1883, the son of James Costello and Rachel Craig, and was educated in Brudenell, in Renfrew, at the University of Ottawa and at Osgoode Hall. Costello was called to the Ontario bar in 1914. He married Mae McKay. Costello ran unsuccessfully for a seat in the Ontario assembly in 1923. He was named a judge for the Huron County court in 1931. Still serving as Huron County Judge, Costello died in a collision on a highway intersection, when his vehicle collided with a truck, in 1954.
