= John Francis Dowling =

Canadian politician

Ontario MPP
- In office 1890–1894
- Preceded by: John Alfred McAndrew
- Succeeded by: Robert Adam Campbell
- In office 1883–1886
- Preceded by: James Bonfield
- Succeeded by: John Alfred McAndrew
- Constituency: Renfrew South

Personal details
- Born: December 3, 1851 Appleton, Lanark County, Canada West
- Died: September 25, 1926 (aged 74) Ottawa, Ontario
- Party: Liberal
- Spouse: Elizabeth Bonfield
- Profession: Doctor

John Francis Dowling (December 3, 1851 – September 25, 1926) was an Ontario physician and political figure. He represented Renfrew South in the Legislative Assembly of Ontario as a Liberal member from 1883 to 1886 and from 1890 to 1894.

He was born in Appleton, Lanark County, Canada West in 1851, the son of Irish immigrants. He studied at the University of Ottawa and McGill College where he obtained an MD CM degree in 1875. He set up practice in Eganville. In 1875, he married Elizabeth, the daughter of James Bonfield who had previously represented Renfrew South in the provincial assembly. Dowling's election in 1883 was appealed in 1883 and 1884; he won the by-elections that followed. He was defeated in the general election held in 1886 by John Alfred McAndrew but then reelected in 1890. He died on September 25, 1926.
