= David Spence (Canadian politician) =

Canadian politician

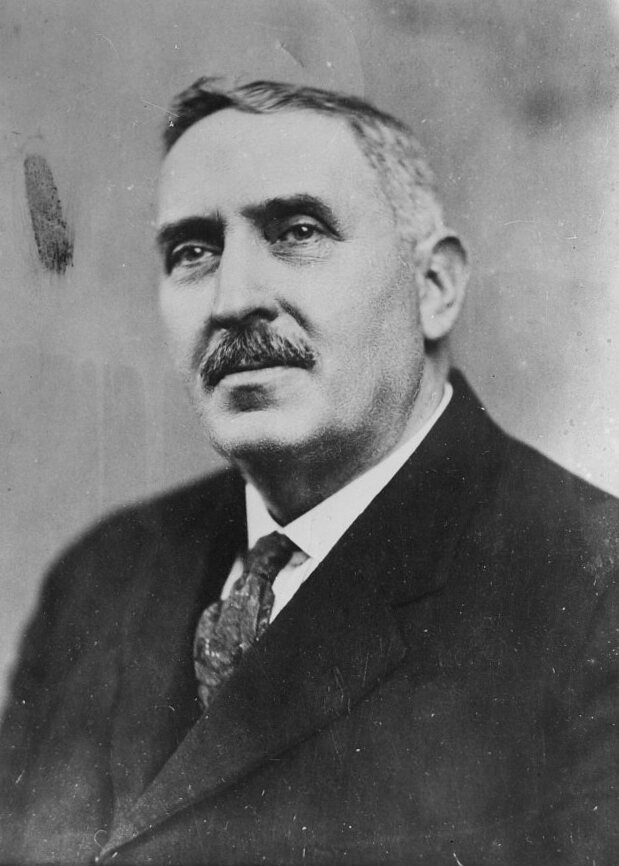
- Spence, c. 1925

Member of Parliament
- In office 1921–1940
- Preceded by: Herbert Mowat
- Succeeded by: Herbert A. Bruce
- Constituency: Parkdale

Alderman
- In office 1910–1916
- Preceded by: Multiple
- Succeeded by: Multiple
- Constituency: Toronto Ward 6

Personal details
- Born: January 25, 1867 Markethill, County Armagh, Ireland
- Died: February 13, 1940 (aged 73) Toronto
- Party: Conservative
- Spouse: Sarah Locke
- Children: 3 sons
- Profession: Businessman

David Spence (January 25, 1867 – February 13, 1940) was an Irish-born Canadian politician, businessman and army officer.

Spence was born in Markethill, County Armagh, Ireland and was educated at a state school before immigrating to North America in 1896. After spending a year in Pittsburgh he moved to Toronto where he established a wholesale fruit and commission business. He served as an alderman on Toronto City Council from 1910 to 1916 and was instrumental in winning approval for the construction of the Prince Edward Viaduct.

During World War I he helped form The Irish Regiment of Canada and was one of its officers but was not permitted to go overseas to fight because of his age.

Spence was first elected to the House of Commons of Canada as a Conservative in the 1921 federal election. He represented the Parkdale electoral district, and was re-elected in the four succeeding elections: 1925, 1926, 1930 and 1935. He served in the House for almost 19 years until his death prior to the 1940 federal election. He was already nominated as the Tory's Parkdale candidate when he died.

He intended to run as a Conservative in the 1917 federal election; but withdrew from the race in order to support Liberal-Unionist Herbert Mowat, who was running as a supporter of the Union Government formed by Conservative Prime Minister Robert Borden. Mowat was appointed to the bench prior to the 1921 federal election freeing up the riding for Spence to contest.
