= Eric Harrington =

Canadian politician

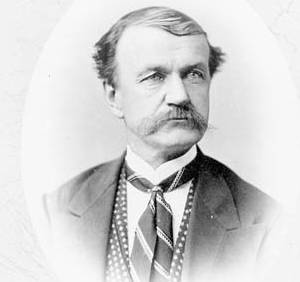

Ontario MPP
- In office 1871–1874
- Preceded by: John Lorn McDougall
- Succeeded by: James Bonfield
- Constituency: Renfrew South

Personal details
- Born: June 6, 1820 St. Andrews, Quebec
- Died: September 4, 1898 (aged 78) Arnprior, Ontario
- Party: Conservative
- Occupation: Merchant

Eric Harrington (June 6, 1820 - September 4, 1898) was an Ontario businessman and political figure. He represented Renfrew South in the Legislative Assembly of Ontario as a Conservative member from 1871 to 1874.

He was a merchant in Arnprior and served as warden for Renfrew County. He died in 1898.

== Electoral history ==
1871 Ontario general election: Renfrew South
Party	Candidate	Votes	%	±%
Conservative	Eric Harrington	448	63.46	+27.41
Liberal	Mr. Stewart	258	36.54	−27.41
Turnout		706	59.88	−11.29
Eligible voters		1,179		
Conservative gain from Liberal		Swing		+27.41
Source: Elections Ontario

1879 Ontario general election: Renfrew South
Party	Candidate	Votes	%
Liberal	James Bonfield	837	54.28
Conservative	Eric Harrington	705	45.72
Total valid votes		1,542	67.72
Eligible voters		2,277	
Liberal hold			
Source: Elections Ontario
