= Aleksandra Ziółkowska-Boehm =

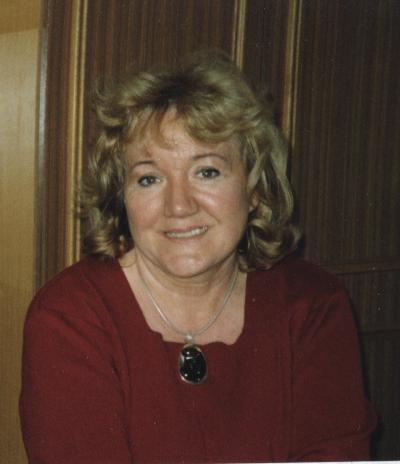
- Portrait of Ziółkowska-Boehm by Norman Boehm, 2014
- Born: 15 April 1949 (age 77); Łódź, Republic of Poland
- Occupations: Writer, editor, essayist, historian, biographer
- Spouse: Norman Boehm (m. 1990; died 2016)
- Children: 1
- Website: Aleksandra Ziolkowska-Boehm publications on Academia.edu

Aleksandra Ziółkowska-Boehm (born 15 April 1949) is a Polish-born United States–based writer and academic. She obtained her Ph.D. in humanistic studies at the Warsaw University. Her works include historical biographies, the current outlook of Native Americans, autobiographical stories of her travels, Ingrid Bergman (a relative of Ziółkowska-Boehm's husband, Norman Boehm), and cats.

== Biography ==
Ziółkowska-Boehm is the daughter of Henryk Ziółkowski (1916–1992) and Antonina (née Laśkiewicz; 1922–2009). She has two brothers, Henryk (born 1946) and Krzysztof (born 1950).

She attended the V Liceum ogólnokształcące im. W. Reymonta in her native Łódź. After this she studied five years of Polish language and literature at the University of Łódź. After her master's degree, she completed a Ph.D. in humanistic studies in Warsaw University. As a university student, she published her short stories and articles in Łódź and Warsaw newspapers and periodicals. She began her writing career as an assistant to Melchior Wańkowicz, a prominent Polish writer. For her help and research with his latest book, Wańkowicz dedicated that book to her, and in his will, he bequeathed all his archives to her. Aleksandra Ziolkowska-Boehm, Love for Family, Friends, and Books (Lanham, MD: Hamilton Books, 2015; ISBN 978076186568-1)

From 1977–81, she was a member of the Repertoire of the Polish Television Theater. She created the scenario for 2 Korpus w piosenkach Ref-Rena, a musical, for Warsaw TV in 1991. She appeared in four documentaries dedicated to: Zbigniew Brzezinski, Stanley Haidasz, Melchior Wańkowicz, and her own uncle, Korczak Ziółkowski. From 1989, she resided in Toronto, Canada as the recipient of three writing scholarships. Since April 1990, Ziółkowska-Boehm has lived permanently in the United States, in Wilmington, Delaware, spending nine years in Texas (Houston and Dallas).

== Personal life ==
From 1990 until his death in 2016, she was married to Norman Boehm.

Ziółkowska-Boehm has one son, Thomas Tomczyk, who is a journalist, photographer, and architect. He founded Bay Islands Voice, Motmot Magazine, and PAYA Magazine, and is the author of Roatan Magic Hidden Jewel of the Western Caribbean (ISBN 978-098297-140-6).

== Education and professional memberships ==
- Master's Degree in Literature from the University of Łódź (1973)
- Doctor's Degree in Humanities from the University of Warsaw (1979)

== Affiliations ==
Aleksandra Ziółkowska-Boehm is a member of a number of professional associations in Poland, the United Kingdom and the United States, including:

- Polish Writers Association Stowarzyszenie Pisarzy Polskich, SPP (Warsaw; 1990–)
- ZAIKS, Polish Society of Authors and Composers (Warsaw; 1976–)
- Zwiazek Pisarzy Polskich Na Obczyznie/Polish Writers Union Abroad, ZPPnO (London; 1990–)
- Polish American Historical Association (Central Connecticut State University, New Britain, CT; 2012–)
- Józef Piłsudski Institute of America (New York; 2012–)
- Polish Heritage Society of Philadelphia (2019–)
- Kosciuszko Foundation (New York; 1990–)
- Polish Institute of Arts and Sciences of America (New York; 1991–)
- PEN America (New York; 1998–)
- Fulbright Association (Washington D.C.; 2007–)

== Awards ==
- Oxford Language Center in England (1975)
- Canadian Polish Research Institute (1982)
- Adam Mickiewicz Foundation (Toronto, 1983)
- Ministry of Culture (Ontario) (1983)
- Institute of International Education in Washington, D.C. (1985)
- The Kosciuszko Foundation (NYC; 1990)
- Recipient Kontrasty award (Warsaw-Białystok, 1980)
- Zloty Exlibris award, Książnica Pomorska, Szczecin (2001)
- The Union of Polish Writers Abroad, London award (2007)
- Fellowship in literature by the Delaware Division of Arts ("for Artistic Excellence in Creative Nonfiction"; 2006)
- Fulbright scholarship (2006–07), and award (2008)
- Ignacy Paderewski medal by the Polish Army Veterans Association of America (2014)
- Gold Cross of Merit (20 June 2014)
- Gold Award by the Polish Booksellers Association (Warsaw, 20 October 2014)
- Skalny Civic Achievement Award, The Polish American Historical Association (PAHA), Central Connecticut State University, New Britain, Connecticut (2014)
- Honorary citizenship of the Gmina Sławno, Łódź Voivodeship (2014)
- Gloria Artis award (Warsaw, 2015)
- Turzanski Foundation Literary Award, Toronto, Ontario, Canada (2015)
- Polish Heritage Society of Philadelphia Award ("in recognition for outstanding literary achievements"; 2018)
- Polish Armenian Culture and Heritage Foundation - Expressions of Recognition and Admiration (Warsaw, 2019)
- Witness to History/Świadek Historii award ("in recognition of the special merits in commemorating the History of the Polish Nation"; IPN-Institute of National Remembrance, Warsaw, 2019)
- Albert Nelson Marquis Lifetime Achievement Award by Marquis Who's Who (2020)
- Outstanding Pole Abroad Award (New York 2020; Pangea Network USA, Polish Promotional Emblem Foundation "Teraz Polska")
- Title of "VIP Alumni of University of Łódź", 2021
- Title of Honorary Member of the "Major Hubal Family" Association ("For the author of many books about the fate of soldiers of the Polish Army Major" Hubal, including about Romuald Rodziewicz"), 2022
- Janusz Kurtyka Award (for books promoting Polish History; 2022)
- Krzyż Kawalerski Orderu Zasługi Rzeczpospolitej Polskiej (The Order of Merit of the Republic of Poland -“for memorializing recent Polish history”), 2025

== Works ==
In Poland:

- Blisko Wańkowicza (Near Wańkowicz); Wyd. Literackie Kraków 1975, 1978, 1988; ISBN 83-08-01917-X
- Z miejsca na miejsce (From One Place to Another); Kraków 1983, Warsaw 1986, 1997; ISBN 83-08-00982-4; ISBN 83-7021-009-0; ISBN 83-904286-6-0
- Kanada, Kanada (Canada, Canada...); Warsaw 1986; ISBN 83-7021-006-6
- Diecezja Łódzka i jej biskupi (Diocese in Łódź and its bishops); Łódź 1987; ISBN 83-85022-00-7
- Moje i zasłyszane (Mine and Overheard Stories); Warsaw 1988; ISBN 83-07-01275-9
- Kanadyjski senator (Canadian Senator); Warsaw 1989; ISBN 83-7021-023-6
- Na tropach Wańkowicza (On Wańkowicz Footsteps); Warsaw 1989, 1999; ISBN 978-83-7648-261-3 / ISBN 83-7180-349-4; Expanded Edition: Na tropach Wańkowicza po latach (In Wańkowicz's Footsteps - After the Years ); Warsaw 2009; ISBN 978-83-7648-261-3
- Proces M. Wańkowicza 1964 (The Trial of M. Wańkowicz 1964 ); Warsaw 1990; ISBN 83-85135-08-1
- Nie tylko Ameryka (Not only America ); Dom Ksiazki, Warsaw 1992; ISBN 83-900358-1-2
- Korzenie sa polskie (The Roots Are Polish ); Warsaw 1992; ISBN 83-7066-406-7
- Ulica Żółwiego Strumienia (Turtle Creek Boulevard); Dom Ksiazki, Warsaw 1995, Wyd. Twoj Styl 2004; ISBN 83-900358-5-5; ISBN 83-7163-263-0
- Amerykanie z wyboru i inni (American by Choice; Dom Ksiazki, Warsaw] 1998; ISBN 83-900358-7-1)
- Podróże z moją kotką (Travels with My Cat); Warsaw 2002, 2004; ISBN 83-88576-90-9 / ISBN 83-7386-102-5 (awarded "Book of the Year" by Polish bookstores, 23–29 December 2002)
- Nie minelo nic, procz lat (Nothing Changed, Only the Years Passed By); Warsaw 2003 (with Szymon Kobyliński; ISBN 83-7386-045-2)
- Kaja od Radosława czyli historia hubalowego krzyza (Kaia, Heroine of the 1944 Warsaw Rising); Muza, Warsaw 2006, ISBN 83-7319-975-6, 2014,ISBN 978-83-7758-635-8)
  The Union of Polish Writers Abroad (London) awarded it Best Book of the Year, 2007.
- Otwarta rana Ameryki (America's Open Wound); Bielsko Biała 2007; ISBN 978-83-7167-556-0
- Dwór w Kraśnicy i Hubalowy Demon (The Krasnica Estate and Hubal's Demon); PIW Warsaw 2009, 2015; ISBN 978-83-06-03221-5. For the book, she received honorary citizenship of County Slawno.
- Lepszy dzien nie przyszedl juz (A Better Day Has Not Come Yet); Iskry, Warsaw 2012; ISBN 978-83-244-0189-5
- Ingrid Bergman prywatnie (Ingrid Bergman In Private); Prószynski i S-ka, Warsaw 2013; ISBN 978-83-7839-518-8
- Druga bitwa o Monte Cassino i inne opowiesci, (Second Battle of Monte Cassino and other stories); Iskry, Warsaw 2014; ISBN 978-83-244-0363-9
- Wokół Wańkowicza (Around Wankowicz); Warsaw PIW 2019; ISBN 978-8366-27213-2
- Pisarskie delicje (Writing Delicious); Warsaw Bellona 2019; ISBN 978-8311-15655-5
- Melchior Wańkowicz przypominany (Melchior Wańkowicz Remembered); Wydawnictwo Naukowe Uniwersytetu Mikołaja Kopernika, Toruń 2024; ISBN 978-83231-5420-4
- Ocean czulosci (Ocean of Feelings); Bellona, Warsaw 2025; ISBN 978-83-11-17341-5

In CANADA:

- Senator Haidasz (Toronto 1983; ISBN 0-919786-10-3)
- Dreams and Reality Polish Canadian Identities (Toronto 1984; ISBN 0-9691756-0-4)
- The Roots Are Polish (Toronto 2000, 2004; ISBN 0-920517-05-6)
- Senator Stanley Haidasz - A Statesman for All Canadians (Montreal 2014; ISBN 978-0-9868851-1-2)

In USA:

- Open Wounds - A Native American Heritage (Nemsi Books, Pierpont, S.D. 2009; ISBN 978-0-9821427-5-2)
- On the Road With Suzy From Cat to Companion (2010 by Purdue University Press, West Lafayette, Indiana; ISBN 978-1-55753-554-2)
- Kaia Heroine of the 1944 Warsaw Rising (Lanham, MD: Lexington Books, 2012; ISBN 978-0-73917-270-4) / 2014, ISBN 978-0-7391-9053-1)
- The Polish Experience Through World War II: A Better Day Has Not Come (Lanham MD: Lexington Books, 2013; ISBN 978-0-7391-7819-5) / 2015; ISBN 978-1-4985-1083-7)
- Melchior Wańkowicz Poland's Master of the Written Word (Lanham MD: Lexington Books, 2013; ISBN 978-0-7391-7590-3 2017, ISBN 978-1-4985-5633-0)
- Polish Hero Roman Rodziewicz Fate of a Hubal Soldier in Auschwitz, Buchenwald, and Postwar England (Lanham, MD: Lexington Books, 2013; ISBN 978-0-7391-8535-3) 2017, ISBN 978-1-4985-5696-5)
- Ingrid Bergman and Her American Relatives (Lanham, MD: Hamilton Books, 2013; ISBN 978-0-7618-6150-8)
- Love for Family, Friends, and Books (Lanham, MD: Hamilton Books, 2015; ISBN 978076186568-1)
- Untold Stories of Polish Heroes From World War II (Lanham, MD: Hamilton Books, 2018; ISBN 978-0-7618-6983-2)

In BRASIL:

A ferida aberta da América (Donizela, Curitiba, Brasil 2024).ISBN 978-65-85273-29-9. In Portuguese, Translation: Matheus Moreira Pena.

== Sources ==
- James S. Pula, The Polish American Encyclopedia, McFarland, Jefferson, NC 2011, pg 564, ISBN 978-0-7864-3308-7
- Who Is Who In Polish America (ed. Boleslaw Wierzbianski). Bicentennial Publishing Corp. New York City 1996, ISBN 978-078 1805209
- Kto jest kim w Polsce (Who Is Who in Poland), Interpress, Warsaw 1989, ISBN 83-223-2073-6
- International Who's Who of Intellectuals, Cambridge, England 1999–2000, ISBN 0948875-45-3
- Five Thousand Personalities of the World, Raleigh, North Carolina 1992, ISBN 0-934544-68-9
- Polscy pisarze współcześni (Polish Contemporary Writers), (ed. Lesław Bartelski), Warsaw 1995, ISBN 83-01-11593-9
- Agata i Zbigniew Judyccy: Polonia. Słownik biograficzny, Warsaw: Wydawnictwo Naukowe PWN, 2000, ISBN 8301131861, ISBN 9788301131869
- Encyklopedia polskiej emigracji (ed. Kazimierz Dopierala), Volume 5, Oficyna Wydawnicza Kucharski Toruñ 2005, pp.425–26, ISBN 83-89376-15-6
- Wielka Encyklopedia Polonii Swiata (ed. Professor Zbigniew Piasek. In English and Polish). Instytut Edukacji i Rozwoju w Częstochowie oraz Wydawnictwo Akademii Polonijnej Educator, Częstochowa, 2014, pp. 371-373; ISBN 978-83-7542-116-3
- Encyclopaedia of World Polonia Heritage Ambassadors of World Polonia. Edited by Zbigniew S. Piasek, Wydawnictwo Politechniki Krakowskiej, Kraków 2020; ISBN 978-83-66531-19-2
- Marquis Who's Who in the East, New Providence, NJ, 1998 (USA, since 27th edition)
- Marquis Who's Who in the World 2000, New Providence, NJ. (USA, since 17th edition)
- Marquis Who's Who in America, New Providence, NJ (USA, since 54th edition)
- Marquis Who's Who of American Women, New Providence, NJ (USA, since 22nd edition)
- Contemporary Writers of Poland (ed. Danuta Blaszak), 2005; ISBN 978-1-4116-5338-2
- Krzysztof Narutowicz / Alicja Grajewska, Konstelacje, IW PAX, Warsaw 1980, pp. 142–50; ISBN 978-8321101590
- Krzysztof Maslon, Nie uciec nam od losu, Prószynski i S-ka, Warsaw 2006, pp. 29–37; ISBN 83-7469-326-6
- Jan Nowak-Jezioranski, Poland's Road to NATO, Towarzystwo Przyjaciól Ossolineum, Wrocław 2006; ISBN 83-7095-079-5
- Media related to Aleksandra Ziółkowska-Boehm at Wikimedia Commons
