= William Bannerman (politician) =

Canadian politician

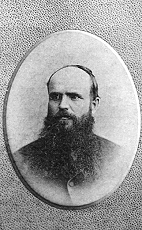

Member of Parliament for Renfrew South
- In office 1878–1882

Personal details
- Born: 5 November 1841 Kildonan, Sutherland, Scotland
- Died: 1914 (aged 72–73)
- Party: Conservative
- Profession: businessman, lumber merchant

William Bannerman (born 5 November 1841, in Kildonan, Sutherland, Scotland – 1914) was a Scottish-born Canadian politician.

The son of Thomas Bannerman and Barbara McCoy, he was educated in Scotland, went to sea as a boy and came to Canada West in 1857. Bannerman worked as a clerk in his uncle's store in McNab Township for seven years. In 1865, he established a lumber company in Renfrew. Bannerman married Isabella Campbell in 1867. He served as reeve of McNab Township for three years.

He was elected to the House of Commons of Canada in 1878 as a Member of the historical Conservative Party to represent the riding of Renfrew South and defeated in 1882. He was also defeated in elections in 1874 and 1875.
