= John Hunter (Canadian politician) =

Canadian federal politician

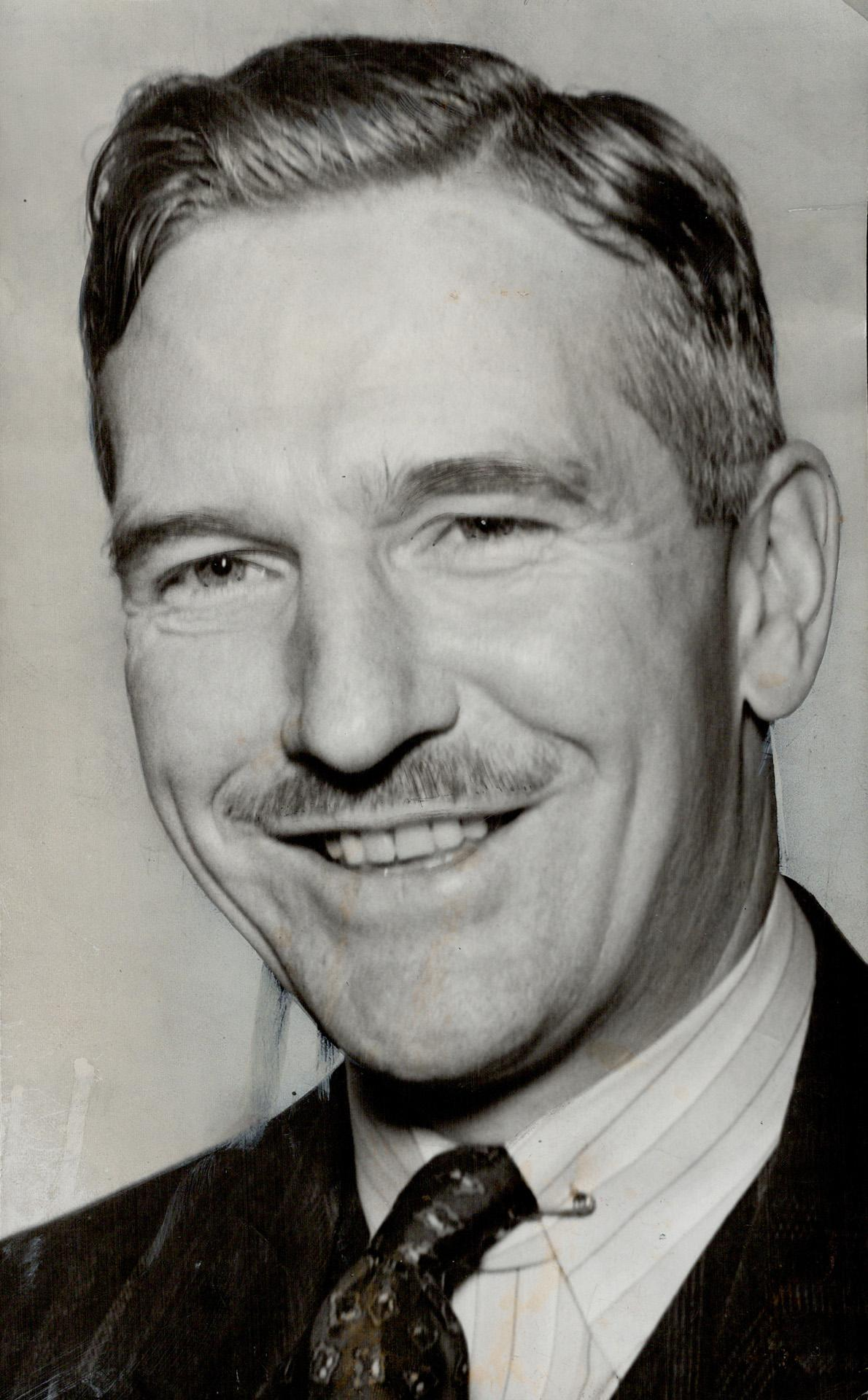
- Hunter in 1946

Member of Parliament
- In office June 1949 – June 1957
- Preceded by: Harold Timmins
- Succeeded by: Arthur Maloney
- Constituency: Parkdale

Personal details
- Born: John William Gordon Hunter; 28 January 1909 Toronto, Ontario
- Died: 15 April 1993 (aged 84) Toronto, Ontario
- Party: Liberal
- Spouse(s): Margaret Agnes Culhane (m. 21 June 1941)
- Profession: barrister, lawyer
- Committees: Chair, Standing Committee on Banking and Commerce (1956–1957)

John William Gordon Hunter (28 January 1909 – 15 April 1993) was a Liberal party member of the House of Commons of Canada.

Hunter studied at the University of Toronto and Osgoode Hall Law School to become a barrister and lawyer.

He was a candidate in a federal by-election at the Parkdale riding on 21 October 1946, but was unsuccessful. He unseated Harold Timmins at the 1949 general election. Hunter was re-elected in 1953, but was defeated in the 1957 election by Arthur Maloney of the Progressive Conservative party. Hunter was again unsuccessful in 1958. He died at Sunnybrook Health Sciences Centre in Toronto in 1993.
