= Robert Adam Campbell =

Canadian politician

Ontario MPP
- In office 1894–1899
- Preceded by: John Francis Dowling
- Succeeded by: Francis Robert Latchford
- Constituency: Renfrew South

Personal details
- Political party: Liberal
- Profession: Lumber merchant

Robert Adam Campbell was an Ontario businessman and political figure. He represented Renfrew South in the Legislative Assembly of Ontario from 1894 to 1899 as a Liberal member.

He was the son of Robert Campbell, who represented the same riding in the House of Commons. Campbell was a lumber merchant in Eganville.
