= Francis Robert Latchford =

Canadian politician and judge

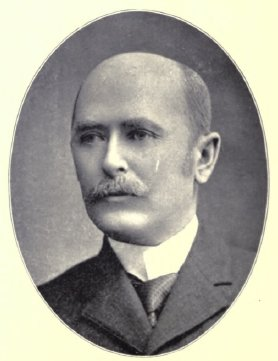

Ontario MPP
- In office 1899–1904
- Preceded by: Robert Adam Campbell
- Succeeded by: Thomas McGarry
- Constituency: Renfrew South

Personal details
- Born: April 30, 1856; Aylmer, Canada East
- Died: August 13, 1938 (aged 82); Toronto, Ontario
- Political party: Liberal
- Profession: Lawyer
- Cabinet: Commissioner of Public Works (1899–1904); Attorney General (1904–1905)

Francis Robert Latchford, KC (April 30, 1856 – August 13, 1938) was an Ontario lawyer, judge and political figure. He represented Renfrew South in the Legislative Assembly of Ontario from 1899 to 1904 as a Liberal member.

He was born in Aylmer, Canada East, the son of James Culhane Latchford, an Irish immigrant, and studied at the University of Ottawa. Latchford was called to the bar in 1886. He was named Queen's Counsel in 1899. Latchford served as Commissioner of Public Works from 1899 to 1904 and Attorney General of Ontario from 1904 to 1905. He was named a judge in the Supreme Court of Ontario in 1908 and served until his death. Latchford was also an amateur conchologist specializing in fresh water molluscs. He died in Toronto.
