= Herbert Alexander Bruce =

15th Lieutenant Governor of Ontario

The Honourable Herbert Bruce FRCS
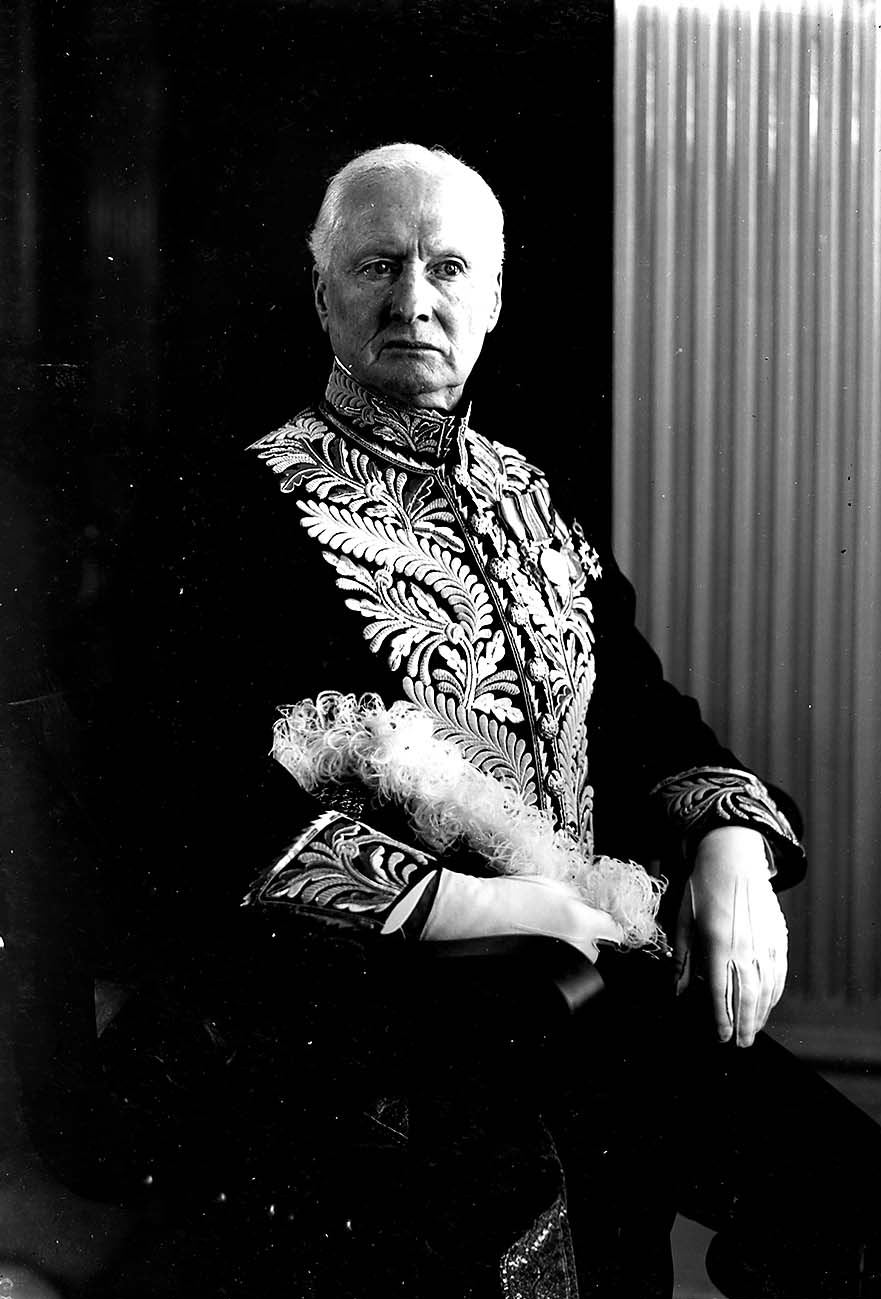

Member of the Canadian Parliament for Parkdale
- In office March 26, 1940 – March 30, 1946
- Preceded by: David Spence
- Succeeded by: Harold Timmins

15th Lieutenant Governor of Ontario
- In office November 1, 1932 – November 23, 1937
- Monarchs: George V Edward VIII; George VI
- Governors General: The Earl of Bessborough; The Lord Tweedsmuir
- Premier: George Stewart Henry; Mitchell Hepburn
- Preceded by: Sir William Mulock (acting)
- Succeeded by: Albert Edward Matthews

Personal details
- Born: Herbert Alexander Bruce; September 28, 1868 Blackstock, Ontario
- Died: June 23, 1963 (aged 94) Toronto, Ontario, Canada
- Party: Progressive Conservative
- Spouse: Angela Hall (m. 1919)
- Children: Herbert Maxwell Bruce
- Profession: Surgeon, professor

Herbert Alexander Bruce FRCS (September 28, 1868 – June 23, 1963), served as the 15th Lieutenant Governor of Ontario from 1932 to 1937.

== Biography ==
Born in Blackstock, Ontario near Port Perry, Bruce was educated as a surgeon at the University of Toronto and in Paris and Vienna. He was a member of the Royal College of Surgeons. He owned Wellesley Hospital in Toronto which he founded in 1911, and was a professor of surgery at the University of Toronto.

In 1916, during World War I, he was appointed inspector-general of the Canadian Army Medical Corps by Sir Sam Hughes, and attained the rank of colonel in the Canadian Army (Permanent Active Militia).

Bruce investigated medical practices in the army and issued a Report on the Canadian Army Medical Service which urged a complete reorganization of the medical corps. Few of his recommendations for general reorganization were immediately feasible from the military and economic points-of-view, and the manner of his appointment was protested by Sir William Osler as an affront to the medical profession. Bruce's report was disowned by the government at the time and he was dismissed from his duties, while his conservative patron, Hughes, was obliged to resign. In 1919, Bruce published Politics and the Canadian Army Medical Corps, criticizing the government for its actions but avoiding any specific denunciation of Hughes. Later in the war, as surgical consultant to the British forces, Bruce was able to advance some useful reforms in surgical management, including greater reliance on nurse-anesthetists and operating room technicians.

In 1920, Bruce purchased a farm on Bayview Avenue overlooking the Don Valley and built a Tudor-style mansion which he named Annandale.

In 1932, he was appointed Lieutenant Governor of Ontario by R.B. Bennett for a term that lasted until 1937. He often verbally clashed with new Ontario Premier Mitch Hepburn who attempted to curtail the extravagance of the vice-regal office in the face of the Great Depression. The lieutenant-governor's official residence, Chorley Park, was closed by the Hepburn government at the end of Bruce's term on the pretext of cutting costs.

While most lieutenant-governors are former politicians, Bruce took the unusual step of entering politics following his term as the King's representative. Following the sudden death of Conservative MP David Spence in the middle of the 1940 federal election campaign, Bruce contested and won Spence's seat in the House of Commons of Canada in the 1940 federal election. Sitting as the Conservative Member of Parliament for Parkdale, Bruce was an outspoken advocate of conscription. He was re-elected to a second term in the 1945 federal election, but retired from office in 1946.

His autobiography, Varied Operations, was published in 1958. He died in Toronto on June 23, 1963. He is buried in section Q-143 in Mount Pleasant Cemetery, Toronto.

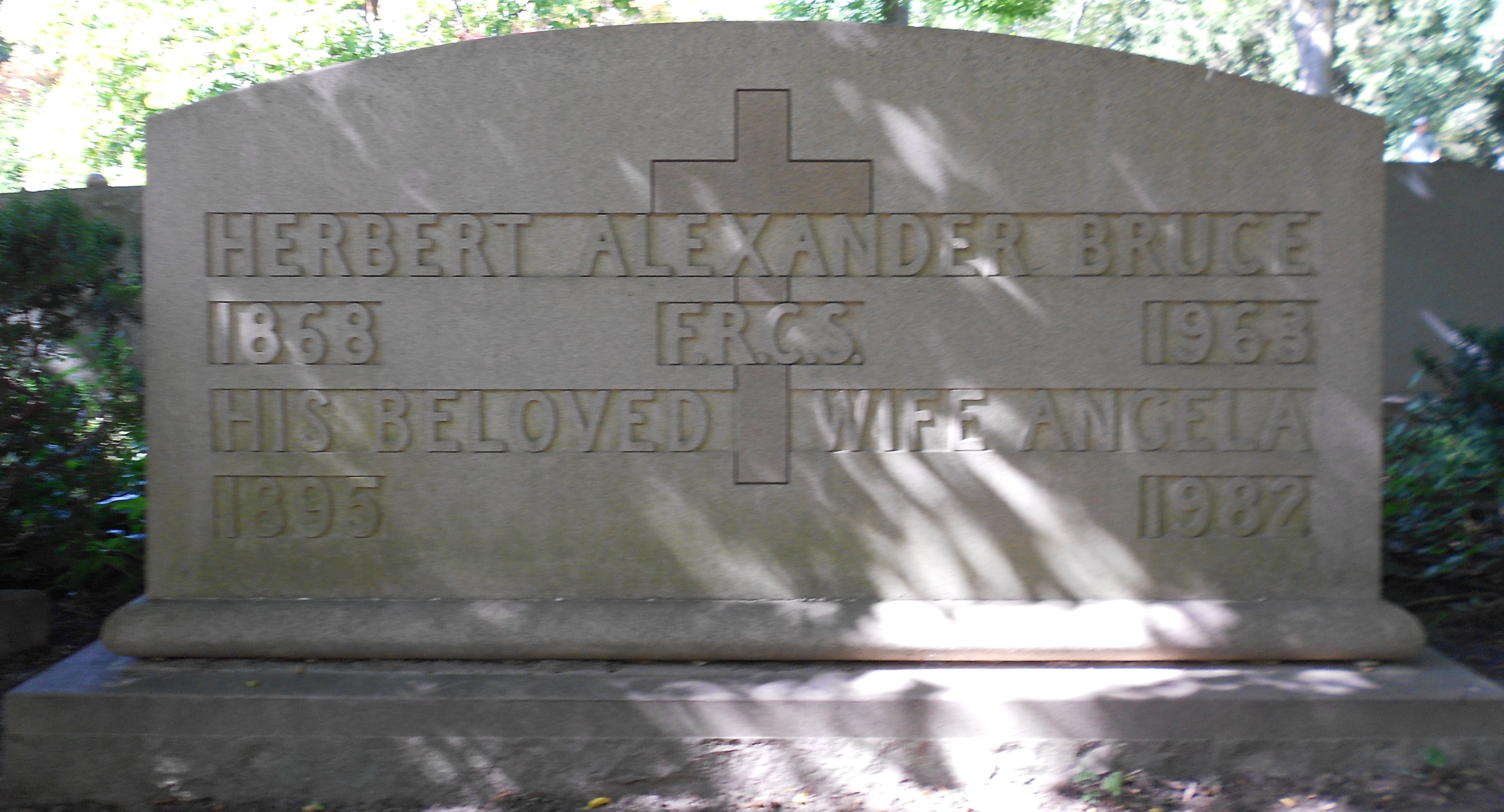
The gravestone of Bruce (section Q-143) in Mt. Pleasant Cemetery

Government offices
Preceded by Sir William Mulock (acting)	Lieutenant Governor of Ontario; 1932–1937	Succeeded by Albert Edward Matthews
