= James Shannon Dempsey =

Canadian politician

James Dempsey

Ontario MPP
- In office 1945–1955
- Preceded by: Thomas Patrick Murray
- Succeeded by: James Maloney
- Constituency: Renfrew South

Personal details
- Born: February 9, 1887 Calabogie, Ontario
- Died: October 24, 1955 (aged 68) Toronto, Ontario
- Party: Progressive Conservative
- Occupation: Contractor, lumberman

James Shannon Dempsey (February 9, 1887 – October 24, 1955) was a Canadian politician who was a Member of Provincial Parliament in Legislative Assembly of Ontario from 1945 to 1955. He represented the riding of Renfrew South for the Ontario Progressive Conservative Party.

He was born in Calabogie, Ontario and was a contractor and lumberman. He died in office of a heart attack in 1955.
