= Herbert Mowat =

Canadian politician

Herbert Macdonald Mowat, K.C.
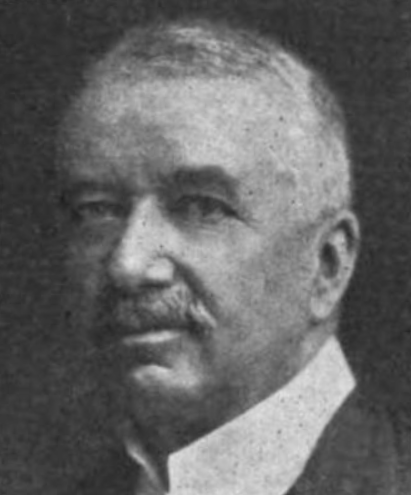

Member of Parliament
- In office 1917–1921
- Preceded by: first member
- Succeeded by: David Spence
- Constituency: Parkdale

Personal details
- Born: Herbert Macdonald Mowat; April 11, 1863 Kingston, Canada West
- Died: April 24, 1928 (aged 65) Toronto
- Party: Liberal-Unionist
- Spouse: Mary
- Profession: Lawyer, judge

Herbert Macdonald Mowat (April 11, 1863 – April 24, 1928) was a lawyer, jurist, and Canadian parliamentarian.

A nephew of longtime Ontario premier Oliver Mowat, Herbert Mowat was elected president of the Toronto Reform Association (the Toronto wing of the Liberal Party) in 1901 and then became president of the General Reform Association of Ontario (i.e. the Ontario Liberal Party) in 1905 and served in that position until 1911. He ran unsuccessfully for the Liberals in the 1911 federal election in the riding of Ontario North but was elected to the House of Commons of Canada in the 1917 federal election as a Liberal-Unionist from Parkdale. He was appointed to the Supreme Court of Ontario in 1921 and served on the bench until his death.

A longtime member of the Canadian Militia, he was not accepted for overseas service during World War I. Instead, he acted a military recruiter serving as Brigade Major of the 3rd and 8th Infantry Brigade at Camp Borden. He was also an active executive member of the British Empire League of Canada.

1911 Canadian federal election: Ontario North
Party	Candidate	Votes
Conservative	Samuel Simpson Sharpe	2,130
Liberal	Herbert Macdonald Mowat	1,572
