= James William Baskin =

Canadian politician

Member of the Canadian Parliament for Renfrew South
- In office June 10, 1957 – April 7, 1963
- Preceded by: James Joseph McCann
- Succeeded by: John James Greene

Personal details
- Born: January 4, 1920 Norwood, Ontario
- Died: January 8, 1999 (aged 79)
- Party: Progressive Conservative
- Occupation: businessman, lumberman

James William Baskin (January 4, 1920 – January 8, 1999) was a Canadian politician, businessman and lumberman. He was elected to the House of Commons of Canada as a Member of the Progressive Conservative Party to represent the riding of Renfrew South in the 1957 federal election. He was re-elected in 1958 and 1962.

The son of James Robert Baskin and Ethel Gill, he was educated in Norwood. In 1940, he married Gladys L. Scott. Baskin operated a wholesale lumber business in Renfrew.

He lost in the elections of 1963, 1965 and 1968, the latter in which he was a candidate for the riding of Lanark and Renfrew. Prior to his federal political experience, he served in World War II in the Royal Canadian Air Force for five years.
