= John Carty (Ontario politician) =

Canadian politician

Member of the Ontario Provincial Parliament for Renfrew South
- In office October 20, 1919 – October 18, 1926
- Preceded by: Thomas McGarry
- Succeeded by: Thomas Moore Costello

Personal details
- Party: United Farmers of Ontario

John Carty was a Canadian politician from the United Farmers of Ontario. He represented Renfrew South in the Legislative Assembly of Ontario from 1919 to 1926.

== See also ==
- 15th Parliament of Ontario
- 16th Parliament of Ontario
