= Thomas McGarry =

Canadian politician

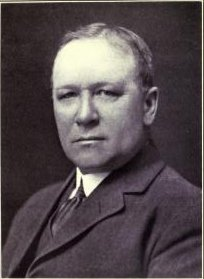

Ontario MPP
- In office 1905–1919
- Preceded by: Francis Robert Latchford
- Succeeded by: John Carty
- Constituency: Renfrew South

Personal details
- Born: August 19, 1871 Drummond Township, Lanark County, Ontario
- Died: March 22, 1935 (aged 63) Toronto, Ontario
- Party: Conservative

Thomas William McGarry (1871-1935) was a Canadian politician. He served as a Conservative Member of the Legislative Assembly of Ontario for Renfrew South from 1905 to 1919, and as provincial treasurer from 1914 to 1919. He was born to Thomas McGarry and Mary Dowdall. He died in 1935.

Political offices
Preceded by Isaac Benson Lucas	Treasurer of Ontario; 1914–1919	Succeeded by Peter Smith
