= Leonard Quilty =

Canadian politician

Ontario MPP
- In office 1962–1963
- Preceded by: James Anthony Maloney
- Succeeded by: Paul Yakabuski
- Constituency: Renfrew South

Personal details
- Born: March 27, 1920; Pembroke, Ontario
- Died: May 14, 2014 (aged 94); Renfrew, Ontario
- Political party: Liberal
- Occupation: Farmer

Leonard Joseph Quilty (March 27, 1920 – May 14, 2014) was a Canadian politician, who represented Renfrew South in the Legislative Assembly of Ontario from 1962 to 1963 as a Liberal member. He was elected in a by-election after the death of PC MPP James Anthony Maloney in October 1961. He was defeated in the general election held in 1963. While an MPP, Quilty served on six Standing Committees.

A farmer by profession, Quilty was a lifelong resident of Admaston Township, in Renfrew County, and he had a distinguished career in municipal politics in that area. He served as a Councillor, then Reeve, of Admaston and then as the Warden of Renfrew County. Quilty was married to Irene Wadsworth and they had three children, one of whom died as an infant. At the time of his death, he had eight grandchildren and eleven great-grandchildren.

He died in Bonnechere Manor in 2014 and was buried in Holywell Cemetery, both in Renfrew, Ontario.
