= James Joseph McCann =

Canadian politician

Member of the Canadian Parliament for Renfrew South
- In office October 14, 1935 – June 9, 1957
- Preceded by: Martin James Maloney
- Succeeded by: James William Baskin

Personal details
- Born: March 29, 1886 Perth, Ontario, Canada
- Died: April 11, 1961 (aged 75)
- Party: Liberal
- Cabinet: Minister of National War Services (1945-1948); Minister of National Revenue (1945-1957); Minister of Mines and Technical Surveys (1950)

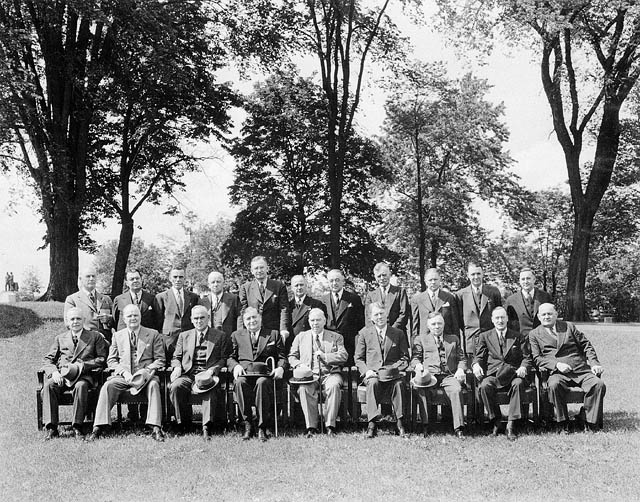
James Joseph McCann is the first man in the back row on the left.

James Joseph McCann, PC (March 29, 1886 – April 11, 1961) was a Canadian politician, born in Perth, Ontario, son of John A. McCann, a mason and licence-inspector, and Mary Hourigan, who were both of Irish descent.

Although he consistently reported his own birth-date as March 29, 1887, he was in fact born exactly one year earlier, and was originally named as James Parnell McCann. His birth registration gives this name in full, with the 1886 date, the entry for his parents' household in the 1901 census gives his name as James P. McCann and likewise supports the 1886 date, and the record of his first marriage in 1913 calls him James Parnell McCann. There is no possible doubt that the politician was the James Parnell McCann born in 1886, as his parents and wives are named in two different biographical dictionaries published during his own lifetime. It is possible he came to be known as James Joseph McCann following the early death of a younger brother named Joseph, born in 1895.

McCann took M.D. and C.M. degrees from Queen's University, Kingston, Ontario, in 1909 (graduating with the gold medal) and a post-graduate degree in medicine from the University of Chicago in 1911. Prior to entering political life, he practiced as a physician at Hamilton and at Renfrew, Ontario, serving for more than thirty years as Coroner for Renfrew County. He was first elected to the House of Commons of Canada representing the riding of Renfrew South in the 1935 federal election.

A Liberal, he was re-elected in 1940, 1945, 1949, and 1953. He was defeated in 1957. He held the following ministerial positions in the cabinets of Mackenzie King and Louis St. Laurent: Minister of National War Services, Minister of National Revenue, and Minister of Mines and Technical Surveys.

His death notice in the Daily Star states, "As finance minister in the immediate post-war years, he was charged with the responsibility of re-settling Canada's economy and was one of the first officials to warn of the danger of too-close economic ties with the U.S." His death notice in the Globe and Mail states, "As Revenue Minister he watched Government income soar to record peacetime levels and took a personal interest in the Canadian Broadcasting Corporation, which he had helped reorganize in 1941.... During his political career Dr. McCann was an early advocate in the Liberal Party for government health programs, many of which later became realities." McCann was twice married, but had no children.
