= Henry Joseph Maloney =

Canadian priest (1915-1987)

- Born: 15 April 1915; Eganville
- Died: 7 July 1987 (aged 72)
- Resting place: St. James Cemetery, Eganville
- Education: St. Patrick's College; University of Toronto
- Occupation: Priest
- Board member of: Loyalist College, Sir Sandford Fleming College
- Parent(s): Martin James Maloney; Mary Margaret Maloney
- Relatives: James A. Maloney (brother); Patrick J. Maloney (brother); Arthur Maloney (brother); Margaret Goden (sister); Mary Anthony Bonfield (sister); Elanor Lyons (sister); Anna Lyons (sister); Frances French (sister)

Ecclesiastical career
- Religion: Christianity
- Church: Roman Catholic Church
- Ordained: 1941
- Congregations: Our Lady of Mercy Church, Bancroft

Henry Joseph Maloney (15 April 1915 – 7 July 1987) was a Canadian priest, a school and college governor, and community leader based in Bancroft, Ontario.

Maloney was born in Eaganville in 1915, as the son of physician and politician Martin James Maloney. His three brothers included James Maloney who became a politician and Arthur Maloney who became a politician and the Ontario Ombudsman.

He was the founder of Our Lady of Mercy Separate School and credited for getting Bancroft connected to the Canadian telephone network. He was the first chair of the board of Loyalist College.

In the 1960s, Maloney persuaded the Canadian prime minister John Diefenbaker to sell uranium mined in Canada to the United Kingdom. As a result of his lobbying and negotiations, the closure of the two mines was postponed.

After Maloney's death, Canadian Broadcasting Corporation and The Bancroft Times reported on allegations of him perpetuating a sexual assault.

== Early life and education ==
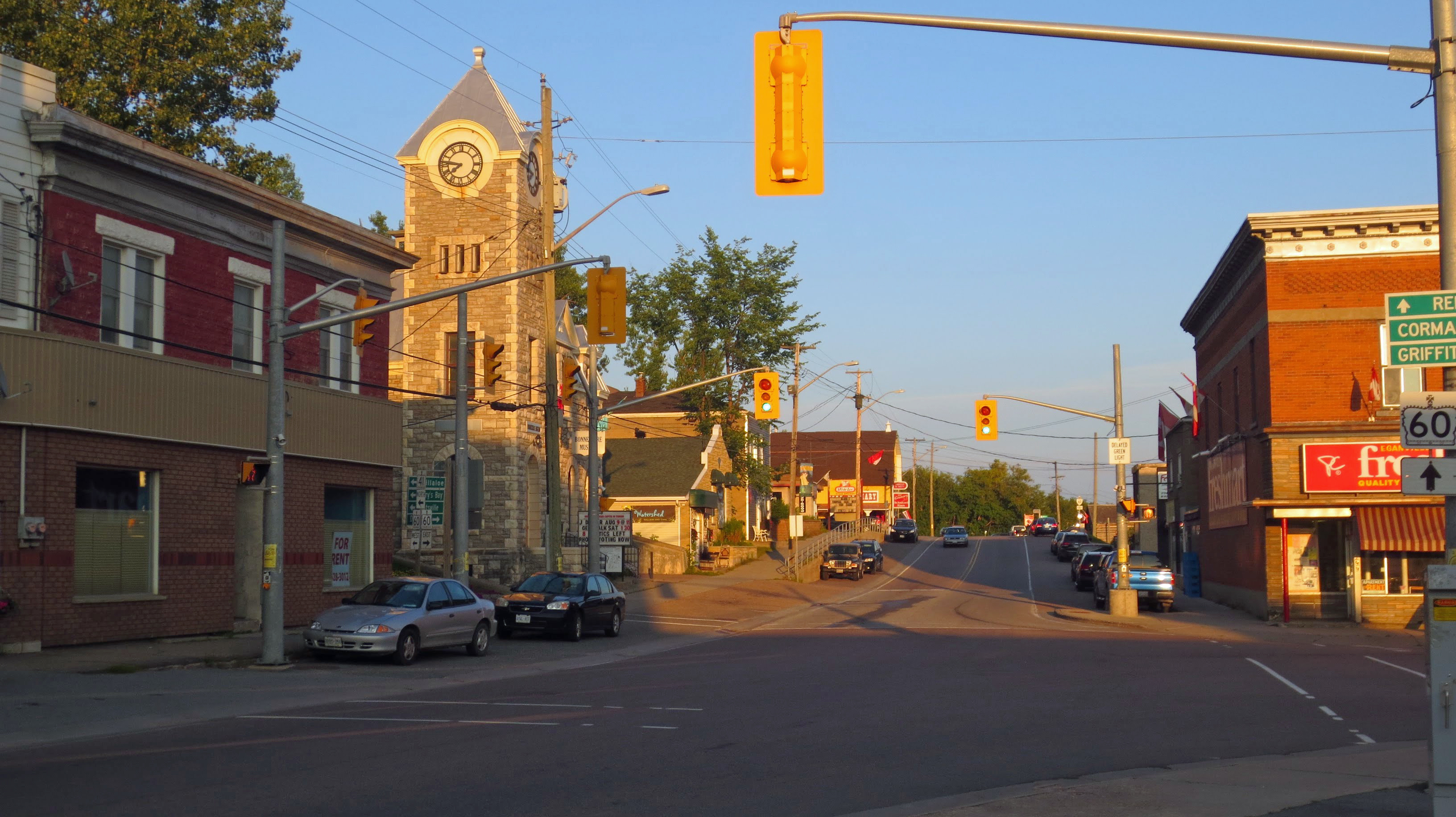
Eganville Ontario

Henry Maloney was born in Eganville on 15 April 1915 to a politician father, Martin James Maloney. His mother was Mary Margaret Maloney.

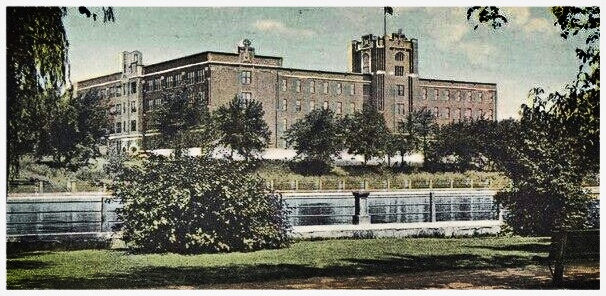
St Patrick's College, Ottawa

Maloney attended Eganville Roman Catholic Continuation school and St. Patrick's College in Ottawa.

He graduated with a bachelor's degree in philosophy from the University of Toronto in 1937.

== Career ==
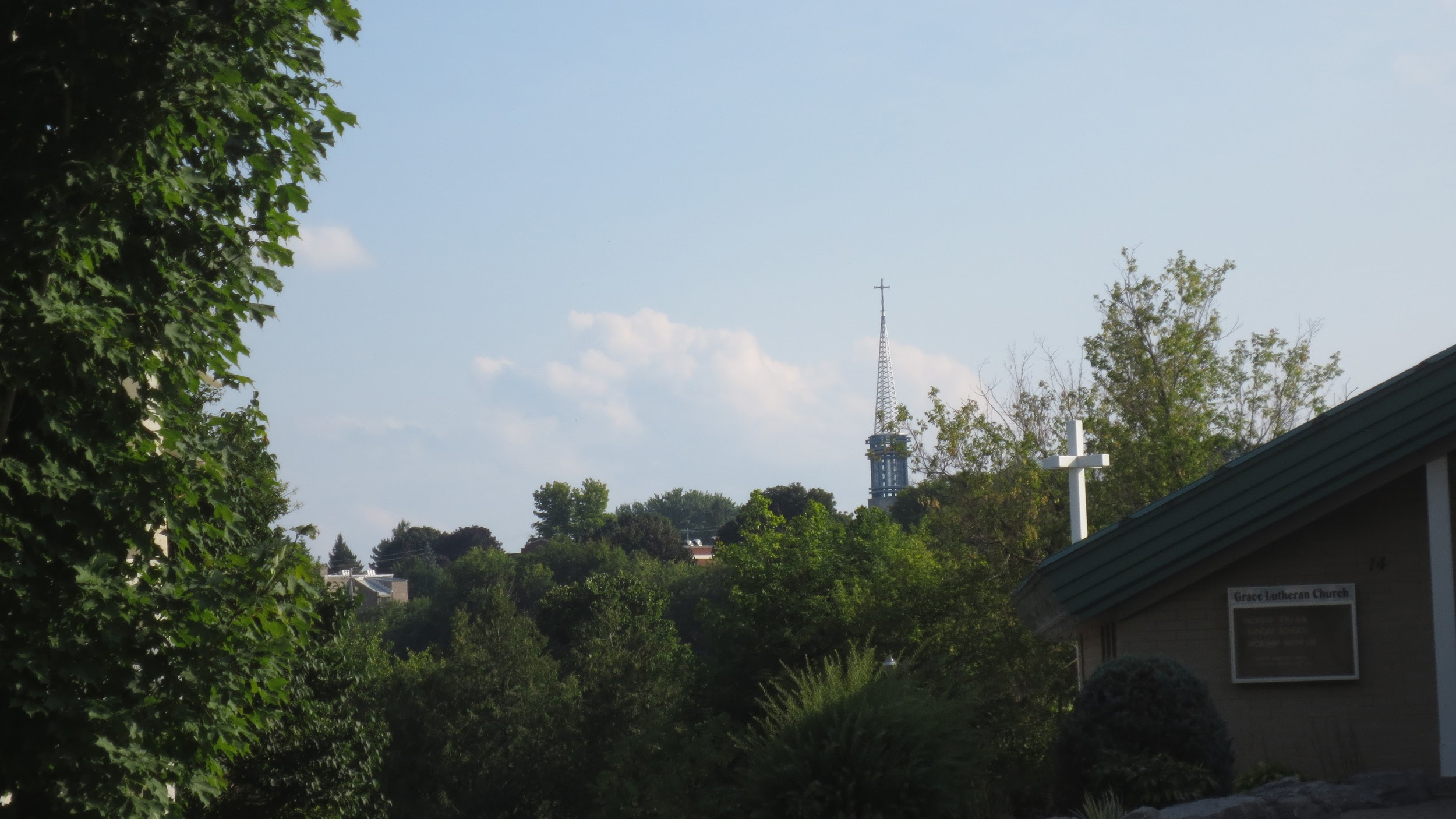
St. James the Less Catholic Church steeple (background), Eganville

=== Pastoral work ===
Maloney worked as a religious assistant in Eganville before being ordained as a catholic priest, by Bishop Charles Leo Nelligan, in 1941. He received his first pastoral assigned to Bancroft on 8 September 1957.

In 1961, he directed the first regional conference of the Catholic Woman's League of Canada.

The 25 year anniversary of his ordaining was celebrated in 1966.

For 29 years, Maloney worked for the Roman Catholic Diocese of Pembroke, based at Our Lady of Mercy Church in Bancroft. Maloney is credited with being responsible for causing Bancroft to be connected to the Canadian telephone network. He was a member of the Diocesan Committee of Liturgical music, and of the Barry's Bay Dennery Committee on Ecumenism, and an official of the Matrimonial Court of Pembroke Dioceses.

=== Educational governance ===
Maloney founded Our Lady of Mercy Separate School in September 1959 and chaired the board of directors that governed Sir Sandford Fleming College in Peterborough, Ontario.

He served on the board of directors of Loyalist College and was the first chair of the board. While College bylaws required to board members to resign after eight years, his significant popularity at the time influenced the Government of Ontario to permit him to stay on for an extra year until 1976, when he was aged 60 years.

=== Government relations ===
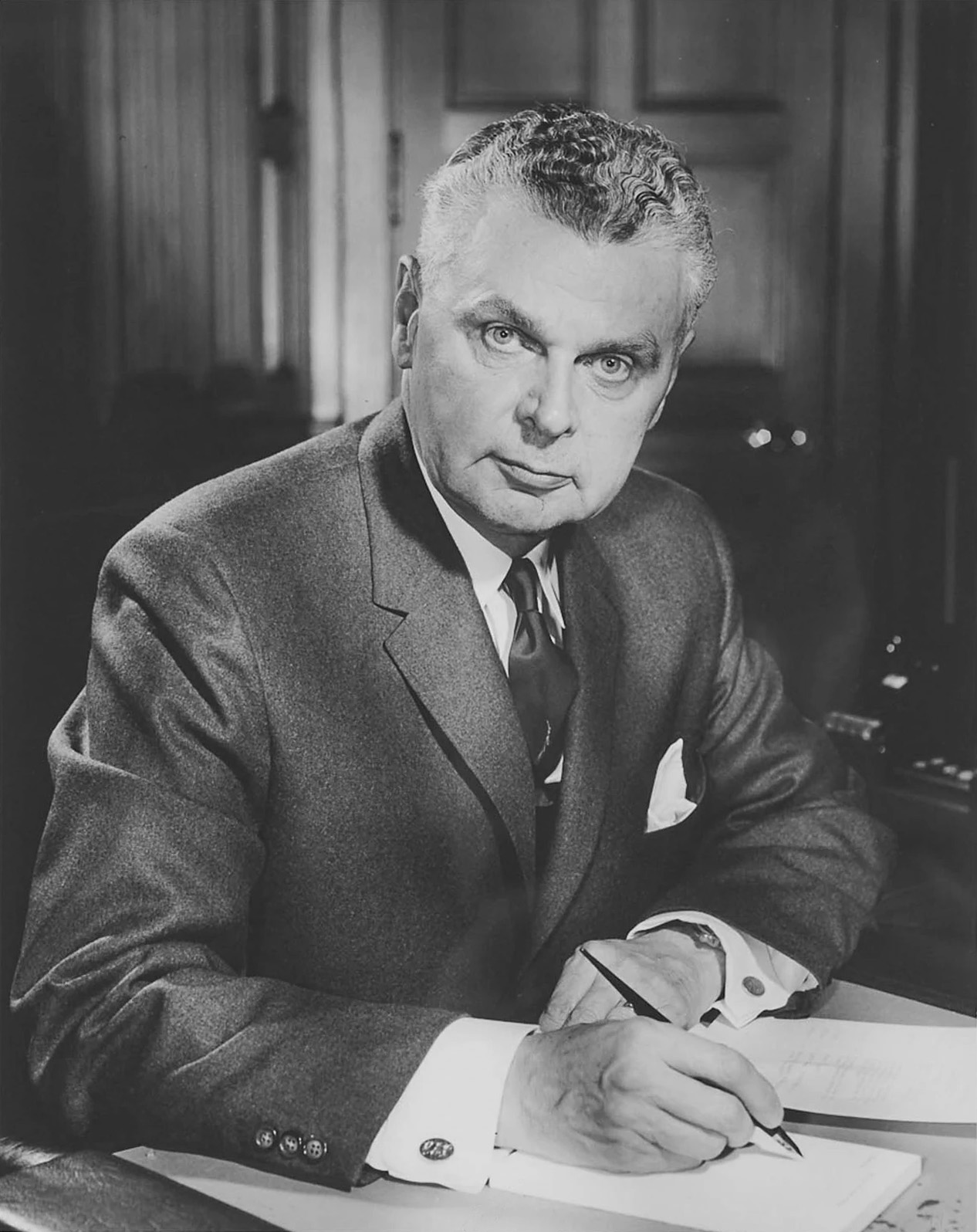
Prime Minister John Diefenbaker

In the 1960s, the Canadian government cancelled contracts to buy uranium from Faraday Uranium Mines Limited. The company owned and operated Greyhawk Mine, and Faraday Mine, and was the largest producer of uranium in the region, at a time when uranium was Canada's largest mineral export. An industrial commission was set up to deal with the unexpected closure, and Maloney was appointed as the chairman. Maloney led Bancroft's community demands of support from the Government of Ontario and Government of Canada which included a meeting with Canadian prime minister John Diefenbaker.

Prime Minister Diefenbaker was concerned by the rising influence of a Catholic priest in a region that was traditionally dominated by Protestant Christians. The prime minister discovered and enforced a previously forgotten contract with the United Kingdom obliging the UK to buy uranium from Canada, prolonging the financial viability of Bancroft's uranium mines by eighteen months, giving the Bancroft community time to plan for new economic activities. Maloney resigned from the commission in 1972, but rejoined it in 1976 when Faraday Mine was reopening as Madawaska Mine.

=== Criminal allegations ===
In 2015, The Bancroft Times, and in 2016 the Canadian Broadcasting Corporation reported allegations made by former student Mike Fitzgerald that Maloney had sexually assaulted Fitzgerald in 1973 while he was 17 years old.

The Eganville Leader newspaper also reported the allegations and that the Diocese of Pembroke settled a civil compensation claim.

While Diocese of Pembroke publicly rejected these claims, the 2015 financial settlement came with terms prohibiting Fitzgerald from speaking publicly about the details. During legal negotiations, Fitzgerald 's lawyers learned that a second lawsuit alleging abuse by Maloney in the late 1940's had been filed.

== Death ==
Maloney died 7 July 1987, and was buried in St. James Cemetery, Eganville.

== Family ==
Henry Maloney had three brothers: James Anthony Maloney (the Ontario Minister of Mines from 22 December 1958 to 1 October 1961), Patrick J. Maloney and Arthur Maloney who was the Ontario ombudsman. His sisters were Margaret Goden, Mary Anthony Bonfield, Elanor and Anna Lyons, and Frances French.
