= Stanley Haidasz =

Canadian politician

The Honourable Stanley Haidasz PC

Canadian Senator from Ontario
- In office 23 March 1978 – 4 March 1998
- Nominated by: Pierre Trudeau
- Appointed by: Jules Léger

Member of Parliament for Parkdale
- In office 18 June 1962 – 22 March 1978
- Preceded by: Arthur Maloney
- Succeeded by: Yuri Shymko

Member of Parliament for Trinity
- In office 10 June 1957 – 30 March 1958
- Preceded by: Donald Carrick
- Succeeded by: Edward Lockyer

Personal details
- Born: 4 March 1923 Toronto, Ontario, Canada
- Died: 6 August 2009 (aged 86)
- Party: Liberal
- Spouse: Natalia Gugala (m. 1950)
- Children: 4
- Profession: Cardiologist

Stanley Haidasz PC (4 March 1923 – 6 August 2009) was a Canadian politician and physician.

== Life and career ==
Haidasz was born to Polish parents who immigrated to Canada in 1910 from Stanislawów. He studied medicine. After graduating from the University of Toronto in 1951, he did post-graduate work in cardiology at the University of Chicago.

Haidasz entered politics when he ran in the 1957 election, and became the Liberal Member of Parliament (MP) for the Toronto riding of Trinity. He was defeated in the 1958 election in which John Diefenbaker led the Progressive Conservative Party to a landslide victory.

Haidasz returned to the House of Commons of Canada in the 1962 election, now representing the Toronto riding of Parkdale. He retained his seat through five succeeding elections until 1978 when he became the first Canadian of Polish descent to be appointed to the Senate of Canada. Prime Minister Pierre Trudeau recommended his appointment to the Senate to Governor General Jules Léger.

In 1964, he served as head of Canada's delegation to the World Food Program in Geneva, and as a delegate to the United Nations General Assembly.

He served as parliamentary secretary to a number of ministers in the 1960s. In 1972, he was appointed to the Cabinet as Canada's first Minister of State for multiculturalism and served in that position until 1974.

During his career, Haidasz was instrumental in the passage of Medicare, the Canada Pension Plan and Income Supplement, the Clean Air Act and other legislation. He also initiated the Anti-Smoking Tobacco Bill.

He retired from the Senate in 1998 upon reaching the mandatory retirement age of 75.

He was awarded a Commander Cross with Star of the Order of Merit of the Republic of Poland in 1998.

== Books about Stanley Haidasz ==
- Aleksandra Ziolkowska-Boehm "Senator Haidasz", Toronto 1983,ISBN 0-919786-10-3;
- Aleksandra Ziolkowska-Boehm "Kanadyjski senator", Warszawa 1989, ISBN 83-7021-023-6;
- Aleksandra Ziolkowska-Boehm "Amerykanie z wyboru inni", Warszawa 1998, ISBN 83-900358-7-1;
- Aleksandra Ziolkowska-Boehm "The Roots Are Polish" Toronto 2004, ISBN 0-920517-05-6;
- Aleksandra Ziolkowska-Boehm "Senator Stanley Haidasz A Statesman for All Canadians", Montreal 2014, ISBN 978-0-9868851-1-2.

== Archives ==
There is a Stanley Haidasz fonds at Library and Archives Canada.
