= Renfrew South (provincial electoral district) =

Former provincial electoral district in Ontario, Canada

Ontario electoral district

Defunct provincial electoral district
- Legislature: Legislative Assembly of Ontario
- District created: 1867
- District abolished: 1987
- First contested: 1867
- Last contested: 1985

Renfrew South was a provincial electoral district in Ontario, Canada. It was created in 1867 at the time of confederation and was abolished in 1986 before the 1987 election.

== Members of Provincial Parliament ==
Renfrew South
| Assembly | Years | Member | Party |
|---|---|---|---|
| 1st | 1867–1871 | John Lorn McDougall | Liberal |
| 2nd | 1871–1875 | Eric Harrington | Conservative |
| 3rd | 1875–1879 | James Bonfield | Liberal |
| 4th | 1879–1883 | James Bonfield | Liberal |
| 5th | 1883–1886 | John Francis Dowling | Liberal |
| 6th | 1886–1890 | John Alfred McAndrew | Liberal |
| 7th | 1890–1894 | John Francis Dowling | Liberal |
| 8th | 1894–1898 | Robert Adam Campbell | Liberal |
| 9th | 1898–1899 | Robert Adam Campbell | Liberal |
| 9th | 1899–1902 | Francis Robert Latchford | Liberal |
| 10th | 1902–1905 | Francis Robert Latchford | Liberal |
| 11th | 1905–1908 | Thomas McGarry | Conservative |
| 12th | 1908–1911 | Thomas McGarry | Conservative |
| 13th | 1911–1914 | Thomas McGarry | Conservative |
| 14th | 1914–1919 | Thomas McGarry | Conservative |
| 15th | 1919–1923 | John Carty | United Farmers |
| 16th | 1923–1926 | John Carty | United Farmers |
| 17th | 1926–1929 | Thomas Moore Costello | Conservative |
| 18th | 1929–1934 | Thomas Patrick Murray | Liberal |
| 19th | 1934–1937 | Thomas Patrick Murray | Liberal |
| 20th | 1937–1943 | Thomas Patrick Murray | Liberal |
| 21st | 1943–1945 | Thomas Patrick Murray | Liberal |
| 22nd | 1945–1948 | James Shannon Dempsey | Progressive Conservative |
| 23rd | 1948–1951 | James Shannon Dempsey | Progressive Conservative |
| 24th | 1951–1955 | James Shannon Dempsey | Progressive Conservative |
| 25th | 1955–1956 | James Shannon Dempsey | Progressive Conservative |
| 25th | 1956–1959 | James Maloney | Progressive Conservative |
| 26th | 1959–1962 | James Maloney | Progressive Conservative |
| 26th | 1962–1963 | Leonard Quilty | Liberal |
| 27th | 1963–1967 | Paul Yakabuski | Progressive Conservative |
| 28th | 1967–1971 | Paul Yakabuski | Progressive Conservative |
| 29th | 1971–1975 | Paul Yakabuski | Progressive Conservative |
| 30th | 1975–1977 | Paul Yakabuski | Progressive Conservative |
| 31st | 1977–1981 | Paul Yakabuski | Progressive Conservative |
| 32nd | 1981–1985 | Paul Yakabuski | Progressive Conservative |
| 33rd | 1985–1987 | Paul Yakabuski | Progressive Conservative |
Sourced from the Ontario Legislative Assembly
Merged into Renfrew North and Lanark-Renfrew ridings after 1987

== Election results ==
1985 Ontario general election
| Party | Candidate | Votes | % | ±% |
|---|---|---|---|---|
| Progressive Conservative | Paul Yakabuski | 14,182 | 51.97 | –3.69 |
| Liberal | Dermott Calver | 9,687 | 35.50 | –4.36 |
| New Democratic | Ish Theilheimer | 3,420 | 12.53 | +8.04 |
| Total valid votes | | 27,289 | 99.73 | |
| Total rejected ballots | | 74 | 0.27 | +0.08 |
| Turnout | | 27,363 | 68.55 | –2.52 |
| Eligible voters | | 39,918 | | |
| Progressive Conservative hold | | Swing | | +0.33 |
Source: Elections Ontario

1981 Ontario general election
| Party | Candidate | Votes | % | ±% |
|---|---|---|---|---|
| Progressive Conservative | Paul Yakabuski | 14,552 | 55.66 | +9.10 |
| Liberal | Dick Trainor | 10,420 | 39.85 | –2.73 |
| New Democratic | Lynne Pattinson | 1,174 | 4.49 | –6.36 |
| Total valid votes | | 26,146 | 99.81 | |
| Total rejected ballots | | 50 | 0.19 | +0.04 |
| Turnout | | 26,196 | 71.07 | –6.48 |
| Eligible voters | | 36,861 | | |
| Progressive Conservative hold | | Swing | | +5.91 |
Source: Elections Ontario

1977 Ontario general election
| Party | Candidate | Votes | % | ±% |
|---|---|---|---|---|
| Progressive Conservative | Paul Yakabuski | 12,666 | 46.56 | –7.64 |
| Liberal | Dick Trainor | 11,585 | 42.59 | +11.10 |
| New Democratic | Harry Pattinson | 2,952 | 10.85 | –1.90 |
| Total valid votes | | 27,203 | 99.85 | |
| Total rejected ballots | | 42 | 0.15 | –0.10 |
| Turnout | | 27,245 | 77.55 | +2.11 |
| Eligible voters | | 35,133 | | |
| Progressive Conservative hold | | Swing | | –9.37 |
Source: Elections Ontario

1975 Ontario general election
| Party | Candidate | Votes | % | ±% |
|---|---|---|---|---|
| Progressive Conservative | Paul Yakabuski | 13,886 | 54.20 | +0.33 |
| Liberal | Howard K. Haramis | 8,067 | 31.49 | –3.10 |
| New Democratic | Lawrence Smith | 3,267 | 12.75 | +1.21 |
| Libertarian | David Anderson | 401 | 1.57 | – |
| Total valid votes | | 25,621 | 99.75 | |
| Total rejected ballots | | 65 | 0.25 | –0.68 |
| Turnout | | 25,686 | 75.44 | –4.40 |
| Eligible voters | | 34,050 | | |
| Progressive Conservative hold | | Swing | | +1.72 |
Source: Elections Ontario

1971 Ontario general election
| Party | Candidate | Votes | % | ±% |
|---|---|---|---|---|
| Progressive Conservative | Paul Yakabuski | 9,370 | 53.87 | +1.09 |
| Liberal | Leonard Quilty | 6,017 | 34.59 | –8.76 |
| New Democratic | Jack McCullough | 2,008 | 11.54 | +7.66 |
| Total valid votes | | 17,395 | 99.07 | |
| Total rejected ballots | | 164 | 0.93 | +0.35 |
| Turnout | | 17,559 | 79.83 | +3.98 |
| Eligible voters | | 21,995 | | |
| Progressive Conservative hold | | Swing | | +4.92 |
Source: Elections Ontario

1967 Ontario general election
| Party | Candidate | Votes | % | ±% |
|---|---|---|---|---|
| Progressive Conservative | Paul Yakabuski | 7,776 | 52.77 | +1.00 |
| Liberal | Leonard Quilty | 6,387 | 43.35 | –2.48 |
| New Democratic | Jacqueline Brown | 572 | 3.88 | +1.49 |
| Total valid votes | | 14,735 | 99.42 | |
| Total rejected ballots | | 86 | 0.58 | +0.10 |
| Turnout | | 14,821 | 75.85 | –3.67 |
| Eligible voters | | 19,540 | | |
| Progressive Conservative hold | | Swing | | +1.74 |
Source: Elections Ontario

1963 Ontario general election
| Party | Candidate | Votes | % | ±% |
|---|---|---|---|---|
| Progressive Conservative | Paul Yakabuski | 7,736 | 51.78 | +6.65 |
| Liberal | Leonard Quilty | 6,847 | 45.83 | –0.25 |
| New Democratic | John B. Johnston | 358 | 2.40 | –6.40 |
| Total valid votes | | 14,941 | 99.52 | |
| Total rejected ballots | | 72 | 0.48 | –0.32 |
| Turnout | | 15,013 | 79.52 | –2.42 |
| Eligible voters | | 18,879 | | |
| Progressive Conservative gain from Liberal | | Swing | | +3.45 |
Source: Elections Ontario

Ontario provincial by-election, January 18, 1962 Death of James Maloney
| Party | Candidate | Votes | % | ±% |
|---|---|---|---|---|
| Liberal | Leonard Quilty | 7,009 | 46.08 | +3.03 |
| Progressive Conservative | Conlin Mulvihill | 6,865 | 45.13 | –11.83 |
| New Democratic | Leonard Laventure | 1,338 | 8.80 | – |
| Total valid votes | | 15,212 | 99.20 | |
| Total rejected ballots | | 122 | 0.80 | +0.36 |
| Turnout | | 15,334 | 81.94 | +2.04 |
| Eligible voters | | 18,714 | | |
| Liberal gain from Progressive Conservative | | Swing | | +7.43 |
Source: Elections Ontario

1959 Ontario general election
| Party | Candidate | Votes | % | ±% |
|---|---|---|---|---|
| Progressive Conservative | James Maloney | 8,411 | 56.96 | –1.53 |
| Liberal | Leonard Quilty | 6,356 | 43.04 | +1.53 |
| Total valid votes | | 14,767 | 99.57 | |
| Total rejected ballots | | 64 | 0.43 | +0.43 |
| Turnout | | 14,831 | 79.90 | – |
| Eligible voters | | 18,562 | | |
| Progressive Conservative hold | | Swing | | –1.53 |
Source: Elections Ontario

Ontario provincial by-election, January 12, 1956 Death of James Shannon Dempsey
| Party | Candidate | Votes | % | ±% |
|---|---|---|---|---|
| Progressive Conservative | James Maloney | 8,444 | 58.48 | +7.76 |
| Liberal | Nathaniel Lindsay | 5,994 | 41.52 | –4.10 |
| Total valid votes | | 14,438 | 100.00 | |
| Total rejected ballots | | – | | |
| Turnout | | 14,438 | – | – |
| Eligible voters | | | | |
| Progressive Conservative hold | | Swing | | +5.93 |
Source: Elections Ontario

1955 Ontario general election
| Party | Candidate | Votes | % | ±% |
|---|---|---|---|---|
| Independent PC | James Shannon Dempsey | 7,033 | 50.72 | –5.29 |
| Liberal | Nat E. Lindsay | 6,325 | 45.61 | +5.39 |
| Co-operative Commonwealth | Hector MacDonald Reid | 509 | 3.67 | –0.10 |
| Total valid votes | | 13,867 | 99.04 | |
| Total rejected ballots | | 135 | 0.96 | –0.04 |
| Turnout | | 14,002 | 77.83 | +8.72 |
| Eligible voters | | 17,991 | | |
| Independent PC hold | | Swing | | –5.34 |
Source: Elections Ontario

1951 Ontario general election
| Party | Candidate | Votes | % | ±% |
|---|---|---|---|---|
| Progressive Conservative | James Shannon Dempsey | 6,875 | 56.00 | +1.93 |
| Liberal | Murray S. Chown | 4,938 | 40.22 | +0.13 |
| Co-operative Commonwealth | George Calver | 463 | 3.77 | –2.07 |
| Total valid votes | | 12,276 | 99.00 | |
| Total rejected ballots | | 124 | 1.00 | +0.25 |
| Turnout | | 12,400 | 69.11 | –0.38 |
| Eligible voters | | 17,943 | | |
| Progressive Conservative hold | | Swing | | +0.90 |
Source: Elections Ontario

1948 Ontario general election
| Party | Candidate | Votes | % | ±% |
|---|---|---|---|---|
| Progressive Conservative | James Shannon Dempsey | 6,744 | 54.07 | +5.68 |
| Liberal | Murray S. Chown | 5,001 | 40.09 | –1.91 |
| Co-operative Commonwealth | Cameron R. John | 728 | 5.84 | –3.77 |
| Total valid votes | | 12,473 | 99.25 | |
| Total rejected ballots | | 94 | 0.75 | +0.12 |
| Turnout | | 12,567 | 69.49 | –4.60 |
| Eligible voters | | 18,084 | | |
| Progressive Conservative hold | | Swing | | +3.79 |
Source: Elections Ontario

1945 Ontario general election
| Party | Candidate | Votes | % | ±% |
|---|---|---|---|---|
| Progressive Conservative | James Shannon Dempsey | 5,864 | 48.39 | +2.19 |
| Liberal | Thomas Patrick Murray | 5,090 | 42.00 | –11.80 |
| Co-operative Commonwealth | John C. MacDonald | 1,164 | 9.61 | – |
| Total valid votes | | 12,118 | 99.37 | |
| Total rejected ballots | | 77 | 0.63 | –0.24 |
| Turnout | | 12,195 | 74.09 | +16.03 |
| Eligible voters | | 16,459 | | |
| Progressive Conservative gain from Liberal | | Swing | | +6.99 |
Source: Elections Ontario

1943 Ontario general election
| Party | Candidate | Votes | % | ±% |
|---|---|---|---|---|
| Liberal | Thomas Patrick Murray | 4,921 | 53.80 | +6.53 |
| Progressive Conservative | John James Foran | 4,226 | 46.20 | +7.68 |
| Total valid votes | | 9,147 | 99.13 | |
| Total rejected ballots | | 80 | 0.87 | +0.19 |
| Turnout | | 9,227 | 58.06 | –17.75 |
| Eligible voters | | 15,891 | | |
| Liberal hold | | Swing | | –0.58 |
Source: Elections Ontario

1937 Ontario general election
| Party | Candidate | Votes | % | ±% |
|---|---|---|---|---|
| Liberal | Thomas Patrick Murray | 5,887 | 47.27 | –17.90 |
| Conservative | John Henry Finlay | 4,797 | 38.52 | +3.70 |
| Independent Liberal | John Stephen McCann | 1,769 | 14.21 | – |
| Total valid votes | | 12,453 | 99.32 | |
| Total rejected ballots | | 85 | 0.68 | –0.03 |
| Turnout | | 12,538 | 75.82 | –0.19 |
| Eligible voters | | 16,537 | | |
| Liberal hold | | Swing | | –10.80 |
Source: Elections Ontario

1934 Ontario general election
| Party | Candidate | Votes | % | ±% |
|---|---|---|---|---|
| Liberal | Thomas Patrick Murray | 8,406 | 65.18 | +14.74 |
| Conservative | John Henry Finlay | 4,491 | 34.82 | –14.74 |
| Total valid votes | | 12,897 | 99.29 | |
| Total rejected ballots | | 92 | 0.71 | –0.03 |
| Turnout | | 12,989 | 76.00 | +8.57 |
| Eligible voters | | 17,090 | | |
| Liberal hold | | Swing | | +14.74 |
Source: Elections Ontario

1929 Ontario general election
| Party | Candidate | Votes | % | ±% |
|---|---|---|---|---|
| Liberal | Thomas Patrick Murray | 4,990 | 50.44 | – |
| Conservative | Thomas Moore Costello | 4,903 | 49.56 | –7.36 |
| Total valid votes | | 9,893 | 99.26 | |
| Total rejected ballots | | 74 | 0.74 | +0.35 |
| Turnout | | 9,967 | 67.43 | +4.16 |
| Eligible voters | | 14,781 | | |
| Liberal gain from Conservative | | Swing | | – |
Source: Elections Ontario

1926 Ontario general election
| Party | Candidate | Votes | % | ±% |
|---|---|---|---|---|
| Conservative | Thomas Moore Costello | 5,208 | 56.92 | +25.75 |
| Liberal–Progressive | John Carty | 3,941 | 43.08 | +5.67 |
| Total valid votes | | 9,149 | 99.61 | |
| Total rejected ballots | | 36 | 0.39 | –0.09 |
| Turnout | | 9,185 | 63.27 | –4.18 |
| Eligible voters | | 14,517 | | |
| Conservative gain from United Farmers | | Swing | | +10.04 |
Source: Elections Ontario

1923 Ontario general election
| Party | Candidate | Votes | % | ±% |
|---|---|---|---|---|
| United Farmers | John Carty | 3,653 | 37.41 | –14.12 |
| Liberal | John Stephen McCann | 3,068 | 31.42 | – |
| Conservative | Thomas Moore Costello | 3,044 | 31.17 | –17.30 |
| Total valid votes | | 9,765 | 99.52 | |
| Total rejected ballots | | 47 | 0.48 | –2.01 |
| Turnout | | 9,812 | 67.45 | –3.07 |
| Eligible voters | | 14,547 | | |
| United Farmers hold | | Swing | | –7.06 |
Source: Elections Ontario

1919 Ontario general election
| Party | Candidate | Votes | % | ±% |
|---|---|---|---|---|
| United Farmers | John Carty | 5,426 | 51.53 | – |
| Conservative | Thomas McGarry | 5,104 | 48.47 | – |
| Total valid votes | | 10,530 | 97.51 | |
| Total rejected ballots | | 269 | 2.49 | – |
| Turnout | | 10,799 | 70.52 | – |
| Eligible voters | | 15,314 | | |
| United Farmers gain from Conservative | | Swing | | – |
Source: Elections Ontario

Ontario provincial by-election, January 7, 1915 Ministerial by-election, upon appointment as Provincial Treasurer
| Party | Candidate | Votes |
|---|---|---|
| Conservative | Thomas McGarry | acclaimed |
Source: Elections Ontario

1914 Ontario general election
| Party | Candidate | Votes |
|---|---|---|
| Conservative | Thomas McGarry | acclaimed |
Source: Elections Ontario

1911 Ontario general election
| Party | Candidate | Votes |
|---|---|---|
| Conservative | Thomas McGarry | acclaimed |
Source: Elections Ontario

1908 Ontario general election
| Party | Candidate | Votes | % | ±% |
|---|---|---|---|---|
| Conservative | Thomas McGarry | 2,623 | 52.39 | –2.16 |
| Liberal | Bernard Gervase Connolly | 2,384 | 47.61 | +2.16 |
| Total valid votes | | 5,007 | 99.11 | |
| Total rejected ballots | | 45 | 0.89 | +0.23 |
| Turnout | | 5,052 | 77.82 | +7.17 |
| Eligible voters | | 6,492 | | |
| Conservative hold | | Swing | | –2.16 |
Source: Elections Ontario

1905 Ontario general election
| Party | Candidate | Votes | % | ±% |
|---|---|---|---|---|
| Conservative | Thomas McGarry | 2,457 | 54.55 | +14.31 |
| Liberal | Francis Robert Latchford | 2,047 | 45.45 | –14.31 |
| Total valid votes | | 4,504 | 99.34 | |
| Total rejected ballots | | 30 | 0.66 | +0.57 |
| Turnout | | 4,534 | 70.65 | +1.46 |
| Eligible voters | | 6,418 | | |
| Conservative gain from Liberal | | Swing | | +14.31 |
Source: Elections Ontario

1902 Ontario general election
| Party | Candidate | Votes | % | ±% |
|---|---|---|---|---|
| Liberal | Francis Robert Latchford | 2,676 | 59.76 | +5.06 |
| Conservative | Henry N. Moss | 1,802 | 40.24 | –5.06 |
| Total valid votes | | 4,478 | 99.91 | |
| Total rejected ballots | | 4 | 0.09 | +0.09 |
| Turnout | | 4,482 | 69.19 | – |
| Eligible voters | | 6,478 | | |
| Liberal hold | | Swing | | +5.06 |
Source: Elections Ontario

Ontario provincial by-election, November 14, 1899 Resignation to provide a seat for Latchford
| Party | Candidate | Votes | % | ±% |
|---|---|---|---|---|
| Liberal | Francis Robert Latchford | 1,826 | 54.70 | –0.50 |
| Conservative | Thomas McGarry | 1,512 | 45.30 | +23.30 |
| Total valid votes | | 3,338 | 100.00 | |
| Total rejected ballots | | – | | |
| Turnout | | 3,338 | – | – |
| Eligible voters | | | | |
| Liberal hold | | Swing | | –11.90 |
Source: Elections Ontario

1898 Ontario general election
| Party | Candidate | Votes | % | ±% |
|---|---|---|---|---|
| Liberal | Robert Adam Campbell | 2,455 | 55.21 | –44.76 |
| Independent | John Bonfield | 1,014 | 22.80 | – |
| Conservative | S. J. Dempsey | 978 | 21.99 | +21.96 |
| Total valid votes | | 4,447 | 98.91 | |
| Total rejected ballots | | 49 | 1.09 | –0.37 |
| Turnout | | 4,496 | 72.25 | +2.70 |
| Eligible voters | | 6,223 | | |
| Liberal hold | | Swing | | –22.38 |
Source: Elections Ontario

1894 Ontario general election
| Party | Candidate | Votes | % | ±% |
|---|---|---|---|---|
| Liberal | Robert Adam Campbell | 1,802 | 53.41 | –38.27 |
| Liberal | John Francis Dowling | 1,571 | 46.56 | –45.12 |
| Conservative | John Tierney | 1 | 0.03 | – |
| Total valid votes | | 3,374 | 98.54 | |
| Total rejected ballots | | 50 | 1.46 | +0.32 |
| Turnout | | 3,424 | 69.55 | +6.53 |
| Eligible voters | | 4,923 | | |
| Liberal hold | | Swing | | +3.42 |
Source: Elections Ontario

1890 Ontario general election
| Party | Candidate | Votes | % | ±% |
|---|---|---|---|---|
| Liberal | John Francis Dowling | 1,470 | 49.71 | –41.60 |
| Liberal | Robert Adam Campbell | 1,241 | 41.97 | –49.34 |
| Equal Rights | R. Leitch | 246 | 8.32 | – |
| Total valid votes | | 2,957 | 98.86 | |
| Total rejected ballots | | 34 | 1.14 | –0.79 |
| Turnout | | 2,991 | 63.02 | +3.82 |
| Eligible voters | | 4,746 | | |
| Liberal hold | | Swing | | +3.87 |
Source: Elections Ontario

1886 Ontario general election
| Party | Candidate | Votes | % | ±% |
|---|---|---|---|---|
| Liberal | John Alfred McAndrew | 1,050 | 45.85 | –34.88 |
| Liberal | John Francis Dowling | 1,041 | 45.46 | –35.27 |
| Conservative | John Tierney | 199 | 8.69 | – |
| Total valid votes | | 2,290 | 98.07 | |
| Total rejected ballots | | 45 | 1.93 | +1.93 |
| Turnout | | 2,335 | 59.20 | – |
| Eligible voters | | 3,944 | | |
| Liberal hold | | Swing | | +0.20 |
Source: Elections Ontario

Ontario provincial by-election, January 27, 1885 Void election
| Party | Candidate | Votes | % | ±% |
|---|---|---|---|---|
| Liberal | John Francis Dowling | 926 | 80.73 | +20.87 |
| Unknown | Harvey | 221 | 19.27 | – |
| Total valid votes | | 1,147 | 100.00 | |
| Total rejected ballots | | – | | |
| Turnout | | 1,147 | – | – |
| Eligible voters | | | | |
| Liberal hold | | Swing | | +10.44 |
Source: Elections Ontario

Ontario provincial by-election, January 18, 1884 Void election
| Party | Candidate | Votes | % | ±% |
|---|---|---|---|---|
| Liberal | John Francis Dowling | 1,017 | 59.86 | +7.03 |
| Conservative | Mr. Devine | 682 | 40.14 | –7.03 |
| Total valid votes | | 1,699 | 100.00 | |
| Total rejected ballots | | – | | |
| Turnout | | 1,699 | – | – |
| Eligible voters | | | | |
| Liberal hold | | Swing | | +7.03 |
Source: Elections Ontario

1883 Ontario general election
| Party | Candidate | Votes | % | ±% |
|---|---|---|---|---|
| Liberal | John Francis Dowling | 934 | 52.83 | –1.45 |
| Conservative | Mr. Devine | 834 | 47.17 | +1.45 |
| Total valid votes | | 1,768 | 98.28 | |
| Total rejected ballots | | 31 | 1.72 | +1.72 |
| Turnout | | 1,799 | 69.17 | +1.45 |
| Eligible voters | | 2,601 | | |
| Liberal hold | | Swing | | –1.45 |
Source: Elections Ontario

1879 Ontario general election
| Party | Candidate | Votes | % |
|---|---|---|---|
| Liberal | James Bonfield | 837 | 54.28 |
| Conservative | Eric Harrington | 705 | 45.72 |
| Total valid votes | | 1,542 | 67.72 |
| Eligible voters | | 2,277 | |
| Liberal hold | | | |
Source: Elections Ontario

1875 Ontario general election
| Party | Candidate | Votes |
|---|---|---|
| Liberal | James Bonfield | Acclaimed |
Source: Elections Ontario

1871 Ontario general election
| Party | Candidate | Votes | % | ±% |
|---|---|---|---|---|
| Conservative | Eric Harrington | 448 | 63.46 | +27.41 |
| Liberal | Mr. Stewart | 258 | 36.54 | −27.41 |
| Turnout | | 706 | 59.88 | −11.29 |
| Eligible voters | | 1,179 | | |
| Conservative gain from Liberal | | Swing | | +27.41 |
Source: Elections Ontario

1867 Ontario general election
| Party | Candidate | Votes | % |
|---|---|---|---|
| Liberal | John Lorn McDougall | 543 | 63.96 |
| Conservative | T.P. French | 306 | 36.04 |
| Total valid votes | | 849 | 71.17 |
| Eligible voters | | 1,193 | |
| Liberal pickup new district. | | | |
Source: Elections Ontario

== See also ==
- List of Ontario provincial electoral districts
- Canadian provincial electoral districts
