= Martin James Maloney =

Canadian politician (1875–1953)

Martin J. Maloney

Member of Parliament for Renfrew South
- In office October 1925 – October 1935
- Preceded by: Thomas Andrew Low
- Succeeded by: James Joseph McCann

Personal details
- Born: Martin James Maloney; 9 October 1875 Eganville, Ontario, Canada
- Died: 21 November 1953 (aged 76)
- Party: Conservative
- Spouse(s): Margaret Bonfield m. 19 February 1901
- Profession: physician

Martin James Maloney (9 October 1875 – 21 November 1953) was a Conservative member of the House of Commons of Canada. He was born in Eganville, Ontario and became a physician.

== Early life and education ==
Malone attended McGill University, where he attained his medical degrees (MD, CM). In 1901, he married Margaret Bonfield whose father was James Bonfield, a member of the Ontario provincial legislature.

== Career ==
He conducted unsuccessful election campaigns at the Renfrew South riding in the 1911 election, a 22 February 1912 by-election and the 1921 election. He ran as a Conservative, except in 1921 when he sought the seat for the Progressive party. Malone won Renfrew South in the 1925 general election and was re-elected there in 1926 and 1930. In the 1935 election, he was defeated by James Joseph McCann of the Liberal party. Maloney made an unsuccessful effort to unseat McCann in the 1940 federal election.

== Family life ==
He was married to Margaret Bonfield on 19 February 1901.

Together they had the following children

- James A. Maloney, who became a notable politician
- Henry Joseph Maloney, who became a priest
- Patrick J. Maloney, who became a notable pediatrician
- Arthur Maloney, who became a notable politician
- Margaret Godin
- Mary Anthony Maloney
- Eleanor Maloney
- Anna Lyons
- Frances French
- Catherine Maloney, who became a nun
