= Thomas Patrick Murray =

Canadian politician

Ontario MPP
- In office 1929–1945
- Preceded by: Thomas Moore Costello
- Succeeded by: James Shannon Dempsey
- Constituency: Renfrew South

Personal details
- Born: June 10, 1880 Barry's Bay, Ontario
- Died: October 1, 1981 (aged 101) Barry's Bay, Ontario
- Party: Liberal
- Spouse: Hannah Kiley
- Children: 9
- Occupation: Lumberman

Thomas Patrick Murray (June 10, 1880 – October 1, 1981) was an Ontario lumber merchant and political figure.

Born in Barry's Bay, he held a number of jobs prior to founding a lumber firm in 1902. A local politician for nearly a decade before being elected to the Legislative Assembly of Ontario as the member from Renfrew South, he served in the Assembly for 16 years, before being defeated in the 1945 provincial election.

== Early life ==
Murray was of Scottish descent, although his father had emigrated from Ireland and settled in Sherwood Township in 1865. Thomas was born June 10, 1880, in Barry's Bay, Ontario. He worked as "a wood chopper, lumberjack, railway laborer, farmer, log maker and manufacturing lumberman" prior to establishing his own lumber firm, M & T. Murray, with a mill in Martin's Siding in 1902. By 1952 the company operated three mills in Barry's Bay, Combermere, and Madawaska. Founded with his brother Michael, the duo partnered with John Omanique in 1912 to form the Murray and Omanique Lumber Co. The company was dissolved in 1929 and Murray's interest was renamed Murray Brothers, as his brothers Charles and Dan joined the business. He was active as an athlete and was involved in local baseball for over three decades. He married Hannah Kiely in 1910 and had nine children.

== Political career ==
Despite growing up in a Conservative family, Murray was a member of the Ontario Liberal Party. He served on the municipal council for three years, beginning in 1921, before being elected reeve in 1924 of the Sherwood, Jones, and Burns townships that made up the then-unincorporated village of Barry's Bay. In the 1929 Ontario provincial election, he ran for a seat in the Legislative Assembly of Ontario in the Renfrew South riding against incumbent Thomas Moore Costello of the Conservative Party, who had held the seat since 1926. Murray won by a narrow margin. Amid the Great Depression, and serving under a Conservative majority, Murray supported a provincial Depression-relief initiative to improve Renfrew County roads that improved the local infrastructure significantly. He was reelected three times, in 1934, 1937, and 1943, before being defeated by Conservative James Shannon Dempsey in the 1945 election.

== Later life ==
Murray returned to his lumber business following his defeat, but also remained active athletically, playing curling at a regional senior's level. Murray turned 100 in June 1980 and received a personalized birthday card from Wayne Gretzky. He died October 1, 1981, in Barry's Bay, at the age of 101. His grandson, Sean Conway, served as an MPP for Renfrew North from 1975 to 1999, and for Renfrew—Nipissing—Pembroke from 1999 until his 2003 retirement. The Thomas P. Murray Recreational Trails in Barry's Bay are named in his honor.
