= James Maloney (Ontario politician) =

Canadian politician (1905–1961)

Ontario MPP
- In office 1956–1961
- Preceded by: James Shannon Dempsey
- Succeeded by: Leonard Quilty
- Constituency: Renfrew South

Personal details
- Born: March 30, 1905 Eganville, Ontario, Canada
- Died: October 1, 1961 (aged 56) Ottawa, Ontario, Canada
- Party: Progressive Conservative
- Occupation: Lawyer

James Anthony Maloney (March 30, 1905 – October 1, 1961) was a Canadian politician who was a Member of Provincial Parliament in Legislative Assembly of Ontario from 1956 to 1961. He represented the riding of Renfrew South for the Ontario Progressive Conservative Party.

Born in Eganville, Ontario, he was the son of Martin James Maloney, who served in the House of Commons of Canada. His maternal grandfather, James Bonfield, was also a politician, having served as a Liberal member of the Ontario Legislature. He was trained as a lawyer at Osgoode Hall. Maloney died in office in 1961 of a heart attack.

== Cabinet positions ==
Frost ministry, Province of Ontario (1949–1961)
Cabinet post (1)
Predecessor	Office	Successor
Wilf Spooner	Minister of Mines; 1958-1961	George Wardrope

== Family ==
James Anthony Maloney had three brothers, Patrick John Maloney MD Henry Joseph Maloney and Arthur Maloney.
