= Thomas Andrew Low =

Canadian politician (1871–1931)

The Hon. Thomas Andrew Low
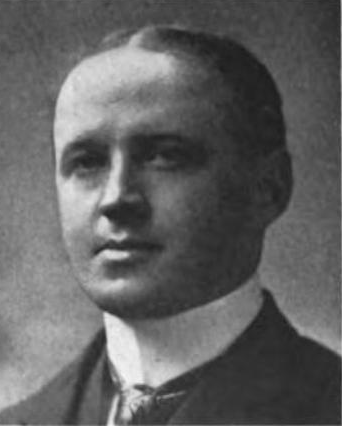

Member of the Canadian Parliament for Renfrew South
- In office 1908–1912
- Preceded by: Aaron Abel Wright
- Succeeded by: George Perry Graham
- In office 1921–1925
- Preceded by: Isaac Ellis Pedlow
- Succeeded by: Martin James Maloney

Personal details
- Born: March 12, 1871 Quebec City, Quebec, Canada
- Died: February 9, 1931 (aged 59) Renfrew, Ontario, Canada
- Cabinet: Minister Without Portfolio (1921–1923); Minister of Trade and Commerce (1923–1925)

Thomas Andrew Low, PC (March 12, 1871 – February 9, 1931) was a Canadian industrialist and politician.

Born in Quebec City, Quebec, the son of Alexander George Low and Margaret Henderson, he was educated in Pembroke, Ontario and became a manufacturer in Renfrew. Low was president of Renfrew Flour Mills, Renfrew Electric Products, the Renfrew Refrigerator Company, the Renfrew Manufacturing Company and the British Canadian Export Company. In 1904, he married Mary G. Dean. He was first elected to the House of Commons of Canada in the Ontario riding of Renfrew South in the 1908 federal election. A Liberal, he was re-elected in 1911 but resigned shortly afterward. He ran again in the 1921 election and was re-elected. He was defeated in the 1925 election and again in the 1930 election. From 1921 to 1923, he was a Minister without Portfolio. From 1923 to 1925, he was the Minister of Trade and Commerce.
