= Robert Campbell (Canadian politician) =

Canadian politician

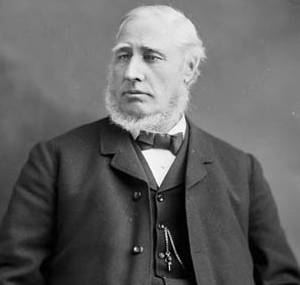
Robert Campbell Source: Library and Archives Canada

Robert Campbell (March 20, 1818 – June 14, 1887) was a Scottish-born Ontario businessman and political figure. He represented Renfrew South in the House of Commons of Canada from 1882 to 1887 as a Liberal member.

He was born in Glenurquhart, the son of Dugald Campbell, and came to Lochiel Township, Glengarry County, Upper Canada with his parents in 1820. Campbell entered the timber trade and was manager for John Egan on the Bonnechere River. In 1845, he married Elizabeth Lothian. He was named a justice of the peace and served on the municipal council for Eganville. He established his own lumber company with his son Robert Adam Campbell. He ran unsuccessfully for a seat in the House of Commons in 1878 before being elected in 1882. Campbell died in office in 1887.
