= Paul Yakabuski =

Canadian politician

Ontario MPP
- In office 1963–1987
- Preceded by: Leonard Quilty
- Succeeded by: Riding abolished
- Constituency: Renfrew South

Personal details
- Born: October 29, 1922 Barry's Bay, Ontario
- Died: July 31, 1987 (aged 64) Ottawa, Ontario
- Party: Progressive Conservative
- Spouse(s): Doreen Conway, Dorothy Diane
- Children: 14
- Occupation: Businessman

Military service
- Allegiance: Canadian
- Branch/service: Infantry
- Years of service: 1940–1945
- Rank: Lieutenant
- Unit: Stormont, Dundas and Glengarry Highlanders

Paul Joseph Yakabuski (October 29, 1922 – July 31, 1987) was a Canadian politician in Ontario. He served in the Legislative Assembly of Ontario from 1963 to 1987, as a member of the Progressive Conservative Party.

== Background ==
Yakabuski was born in Barry's Bay, Ontario, where his family had lived for more than a century after emigrating from the Kashub area of Poland. He married Doreen Mary Conway (April 6, 1924 – December 21, 1974) on December 7, 1946, and the couple had fourteen children. Fellow Progressive Conservative Member of Provincial Parliament (MPP) Norm Sterling once joked that Yakabuski "thought in terms of campaign organization" in his family planning.

Yakabuski served overseas in World War II as an infantry officer with the Stormont, Dundas and Glengarry Highlanders. On returning to Canada, he joined his father in managing the family's hardware, building supply and furniture business. He served on the St. Francis Memorial Hospital Board from 1955 to 1962. He was a Roman Catholic, and a member of the Knights of Columbus.

One of Yakabuski's sons, John Yakabuski, currently serves in the Ontario legislature for Renfrew—Nipissing—Pembroke as a Progressive Conservative. Another of his sons, Kim Yakabuski, was the life partner of former Attorney General of Ontario Ian Scott. His son Konrad Yakabuski is a columnist for the Globe and Mail.Yakabuski was also the cousin-in-law of prominent Liberal politician Sean Conway.

The Paul J. Yakabuski Community Centre in Barry's Bay was named in his honour. Yakabuski and his wife are buried in St. Lawrence O'toole R.C. Cemetery, in Barry's Bay.

== Politics ==
He was elected to the Barry's Bay council in 1951 by a single vote, was Reeve of Barry's Bay from 1952 to 1961.

Yakabuski was elected to the Ontario legislature in the 1963 provincial election, defeating Liberal Party candidate Leonard Quilty by 889 votes in Renfrew South. He was re-elected over Quilty by an increased margin in the 1967 election, and was returned without difficulty in 1971 and 1975. After a narrow victory over Liberal Dick Trainor in the 1977 election, he was again elected without difficulty in 1981 and 1985.

During his tenure, he was a backbench supporter of the John Robarts, Bill Davis and Frank Miller administrations. He served as the Parliamentary Assistant to the Minister of Natural Resources from 1975 to 1985.

He chose not seek re-election in 1987, and died on the day of his retirement.
