= Arthur Maloney =

Canadian politician (1919–1984)

Arthur Edward Martin Maloney

Member of Parliament for Parkdale
- In office June 1957 – June 1962
- Preceded by: John Hunter
- Succeeded by: Stanley Haidasz

Ombudsman of Ontario
- In office 1975–1979
- Succeeded by: Donald Morand

Personal details
- Born: 26 November 1919 Eganville, Ontario, Canada
- Died: 20 September 1984 (aged 64) Rockwood, Ontario, Canada
- Party: Progressive Conservative
- Spouse: Lillian LaBine (m. 1948)
- Profession: lawyer

Arthur Edward Martin Maloney QC (26 November 1919 – 20 September 1984) was a Progressive Conservative party member of the House of Commons of Canada and first Ontario Ombudsman from 1975 to 1979.

Maloney was born in Eganville, Ontario. He became a noted defence lawyer following his 1943 graduation from Osgoode Hall. In 1952 he unsuccessfully defended notorious bank robbers of The Boyd Gang. He was the son of Martin James Maloney, another Member of Parliament.

He was first elected for the Parkdale riding in the 1957 general election and re-elected for a second term in Parliament in the 1958 election. From August 1957 to February 1958 he was Parliamentary Assistant to the Minister of Labour. He was a principal author of the 1960 Canadian Bill of Rights. Maloney was defeated by Stanley Haidasz of the Liberal party in the 1962 election.

Several years of poor health began in 1979 when Maloney incurred a stroke, ending with a cancer diagnosis. In 1984, Maloney died at his residence in Rockwood, Ontario, from that cancer. His funeral at Toronto's St. Michael's Cathedral was officiated by Gerald Emmett Cardinal Carter and politician-turned-priest Sean O'Sullivan. Various political colleagues such as Roland Michener, John Crosbie and Ray Hnatyshyn attended the funeral.

== Family ==
Arthur has two brothers Henry Joseph Maloney and James Anthony Maloney.

== Books on Maloney's life ==
- Advocacy in court: A tribute to Arthur Maloney, Q.C., 1986, ISBN 978-0-88804-043-5
- The Life And Times of Arthur Maloney: The Last of the Tribunes, Charles Pullen, 1994, ISBN 978-1-55002-224-7
