= John McAndrew (cricketer) =

Australian cricketer

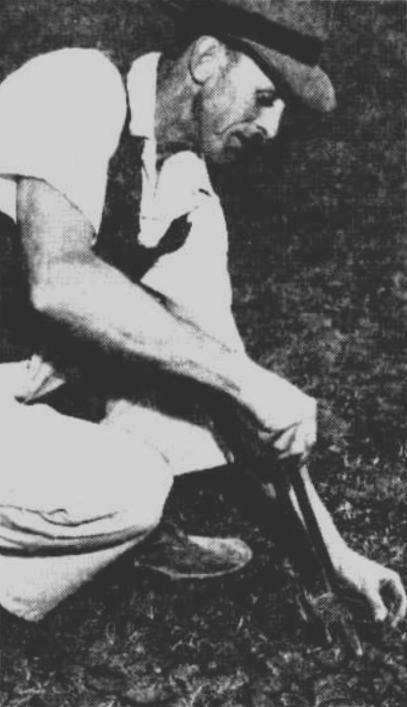
- McAndrew tending to Brisbane Cricket Ground wicket, 1954.

Personal information
- Born: 4 November 1889; Berry, New South Wales, Australia
- Died: 10 April 1961 (aged 71); Ipswich, Queensland, Australia
- Source: Cricinfo, 5 October 2020

John McAndrew (4 November 1889 – 10 April 1961) was an Australian cricketer. He played in eleven first-class matches for Queensland between 1914 and 1925. He served as chief groundsman of the Brisbane Cricket Ground in the 1950s.

== See also ==
- List of Queensland first-class cricketers
