= Isaac Ellis Pedlow =

Canadian politician

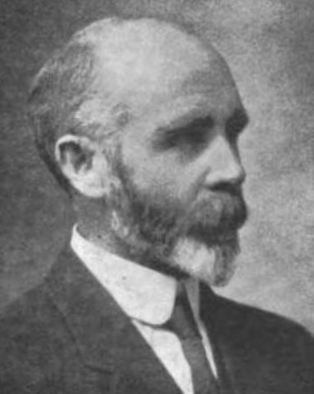

Member of the House of Commons of Canada
- In office 1917–1921
- Constituency: Renfrew South

Personal details
- Born: February 6, 1861; Lurgan, Ireland
- Died: February 13, 1954 (aged 93); Renfrew, Ontario
- Political party: Laurier Liberal
- Spouse: Annie Smith (m. 1889)
- Occupation: Merchant, politician

Isaac Ellis Pedlow (February 6, 1861 – February 13, 1954) was an Irish-born merchant and political figure in Ontario, Canada. He represented Renfrew South in the House of Commons of Canada from 1917 to 1921 as a Laurier Liberal.

He was born in Lurgan, County Armagh, the son of Henry Pedlow and Mary Ellis, was educated in Ireland and came to Canada in 1883. In 1889, he married Annie Smith. Pedlow was a dry goods merchant in Renfrew, Ontario. He died in Renfrew at the age of 93.
