= Parkdale (federal electoral district) =

Former federal electoral district in Ontario, Canada

Ontario electoral district

Defunct federal electoral district
- Legislature: House of Commons
- District created: 1914
- District abolished: 1976
- First contested: 1917
- Last contested: 1974

Parkdale was a Canadian federal electoral district represented in the House of Commons of Canada from 1917 to 1979 . It included the community of Parkdale in the western part of Toronto, Ontario. It was created in 1914 from Toronto West, and continued to exist until 1976 when most of it was merged into Parkdale—High Park with some sections into Trinity. The Parkdale — High Park district was then renamed to Taiaiako'n—Parkdale—High Park in 2022.

== Boundary history ==
It initially consisted of the part of the city of Toronto west of a line beginning where Queen Street West meets Lake Ontario, east along Queen Street West to Dovercourt Road, north the Canadian Pacific Railway, west to the boundary of Ward 7, then along the boundary of Ward 7 to the northwest corner of High Park.

In 1924, it was redefined to consist of the part of the city of Toronto east of Atlantic Avenue and Dovercourt Road, and south of Bloor Street, and west of Indian Road and following Indian Road, Howard Park Avenue, and Sunnyside Avenue.

In 1933, it was redefined to consist of the part of the city of Toronto east of the westerly limit of Davenport Riding from Lake Ontario to the line of the Canadian Pacific Railway; thence westerly along the line of the Canadian Pacific Railway to the boundary between ward six and ward seven of the city of Toronto; thence southerly along the boundary between ward six and ward seven to the point where it intersects Bloor Street; thence westerly along the centre line of Bloor Street to the centre line of Indian Road; thence southerly along the centre line of Indian Road to the centre line of Howard Park Avenue; thence easterly along the centre line of Howard Park Avenue to its intersection with the centre line of Sunnyside Avenue; thence southerly along the centre line of Sunnyside Avenue to Lake Ontario; thence easterly along Lake Ontario to Dufferin Street.

It was further redefined several times.

In 1966, it was defined to consist of the part of Toronto west of Atlantic Avenue and Dovercourt Road, south of Bloor Street, and east of Parkside Drive.

The electoral district was abolished in 1976 when it was merged with parts of the High Park-Humber Valley and Trinity districts to form Parkdale—High Park.

== Members of Parliament ==
This riding has elected the following members of Parliament:

Parliament	Years	Member	Party
Riding created from Toronto West
13th	1917–1921	Herbert Mowat	Government (Unionist)
14th	1921–1925	David Spence	Conservative
15th	1925–1926	David Spence	Conservative
16th	1926–1930	David Spence	Conservative
17th	1930–1935	David Spence	Conservative
18th	1935–1940	David Spence	Conservative
19th	1940–1945	Herbert Alexander Bruce	National Government
20th	1945–1946	Herbert Alexander Bruce	Progressive Conservative
20th	1946–1949	Harold Timmins	Progressive Conservative
21st	1949–1953	John Hunter	Liberal
22nd	1953–1957	John Hunter	Liberal
23rd	1957–1958	Arthur Maloney	Progressive Conservative
24th	1958–1962	Arthur Maloney	Progressive Conservative
25th	1962–1963	Stanley Haidasz	Liberal
26th	1963–1965	Stanley Haidasz	Liberal
27th	1965–1968	Stanley Haidasz	Liberal
28th	1968–1972	Stanley Haidasz	Liberal
29th	1972–1974	Stanley Haidasz	Liberal
30th	1974–1978	Stanley Haidasz	Liberal
30th	1978–1979	Yuri Shymko	Progressive Conservative
Riding dissolved into Parkdale—High Park and Trinity

== Election results ==
1917 Canadian federal election
Party	Candidate	Votes
Government (Unionist)	Herbert Mowat	13,306
Independent	Carson Alexander McCormack	7,736
Opposition (Laurier Liberals)	Gordon Waldron	3,698

1921 Canadian federal election
Party	Candidate	Votes
Conservative	David Spence	10,705
Liberal	William Douglas	5,487
Labour	James Simpson	2,723

1925 Canadian federal election
Party	Candidate	Votes
Conservative	David Spence	14,483
Liberal	Kenneth A. Christie	5,299

1926 Canadian federal election
Party	Candidate	Votes
Conservative	David Spence	11,897
Liberal	Bertram Tipping	4,133

1930 Canadian federal election
Party	Candidate	Votes
Conservative	David Spence	11,713
Liberal	Angus Gillies	5,823

1935 Canadian federal election
Party	Candidate	Votes
Conservative	David Spence	9,619
Liberal	John Leslie Prentice	7,761
Reconstruction	Clinton A. Hurlbut	3,572
Co-operative Commonwealth	Rose Henderson	3,249

1940 Canadian federal election
Party	Candidate	Votes
National Government	Herbert Alexander Bruce	13,605
Liberal	Jack Travers	12,487

1945 Canadian federal election
Party	Candidate	Votes
Progressive Conservative	Herbert Alexander Bruce	11,588
Liberal	Jack Travers	9,981
Co-operative Commonwealth	Ford Brand	4,188
Labor–Progressive	Dewar Ferguson	1,053

By-election: On Mr. Bruce's resignation, 21 October 1946
Party	Candidate	Votes
Progressive Conservative	Harold Timmins	8,212
Liberal	John Hunter	7,569
Co-operative Commonwealth	Ford Brand	6,470
Unknown	Elizabeth Morton	966
Unknown	Len Palmer	64

1949 Canadian federal election
Party	Candidate	Votes
Liberal	John Hunter	12,876
Progressive Conservative	Harold Timmins	10,137
Co-operative Commonwealth	Arthur Waters	6,242

1953 Canadian federal election
Party	Candidate	Votes
Liberal	John Hunter	10,391
Progressive Conservative	Irene McBrien	6,788
Co-operative Commonwealth	Archie A. Chisholm	3,788
Labor–Progressive	John Boychuk	765

1957 Canadian federal election
Party	Candidate	Votes
Progressive Conservative	Arthur Maloney	9,882
Liberal	John Hunter	7,671
Co-operative Commonwealth	Archie A. Chisholm	3,979
Independent PC	John Boland	342

1958 Canadian federal election
Party	Candidate	Votes
Progressive Conservative	Arthur Maloney	13,640
Liberal	John Hunter	8,599
Co-operative Commonwealth	Archie A. Chisholm	3,492
Labor–Progressive	Nelson Clarke	344

1962 Canadian federal election
Party	Candidate	Votes
Liberal	Stanley Haidasz	10,780
Progressive Conservative	Arthur Maloney	8,946
New Democratic	Tom Campbell	5,759
Social Credit	M. Watson Middleton	224

1963 Canadian federal election
Party	Candidate	Votes
Liberal	Stanley Haidasz	12,694
Progressive Conservative	William C. Dymond	6,308
New Democratic	Tom Campbell	5,538
Social Credit	Olive E. Calvert Sloan	259

1965 Canadian federal election
Party	Candidate	Votes
Liberal	Stanley Haidasz	11,974
Progressive Conservative	Felicity Cochrane	6,104
New Democratic	Ralph Dye	5,194

1968 Canadian federal election
Party	Candidate	Votes
Liberal	Stanley Haidasz	14,717
New Democratic	Bruce Rogers	8,983
Progressive Conservative	Kay Armstrong	5,057

1972 Canadian federal election
Party	Candidate	Votes
Liberal	Stanley Haidasz	12,214
Progressive Conservative	Lubor J. Zink	8,990
New Democratic	Mike Gurstein	6,478
No affiliation	Dennis Deveau	201

1974 Canadian federal election
Party	Candidate	Votes
Liberal	Stanley Haidasz	13,134
Progressive Conservative	Lubor J. Zink	7,133
New Democratic	Evelyn Cotter	4,479
Independent	Terence Young	144
Communist	Neil McLellan	132
Marxist–Leninist	Gordon MacLean	95

By-election: Resignation of the Hon. S. Haidasz, 16 October 1978
Party	Candidate	Votes
Progressive Conservative	Yuri Shymko	6,759
Liberal	Art Eggleton	5,721
New Democratic	Doug Little	4,806
Communist	Anna Larsen	190

== See also ==
- List of Canadian electoral districts
- Historical federal electoral districts of Canada
