= John Alfred McAndrew =

Canadian politician

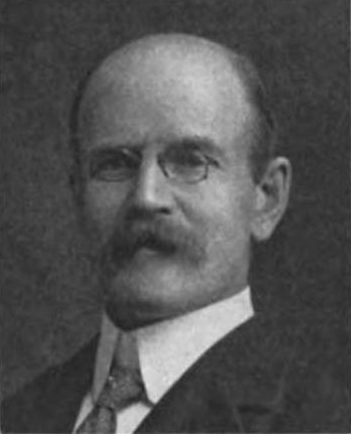

Ontario MPP
- In office 1886–1890
- Preceded by: John Francis Dowling
- Succeeded by: John Francis Dowling
- Constituency: Renfrew South

Personal details
- Born: December 27, 1859 Renfrew, Canada West
- Died: July 1, 1923 (aged 63) Toronto, Ontario
- Party: Liberal

John Alfred McAndrew (December 27, 1859 – July 1, 1923) was an Ontario lawyer and political figure. He represented Renfrew South in the Legislative Assembly of Ontario from 1886 to 1890 as a Liberal member.

He was born in Renfrew, Canada West in 1859, the son of John McAndrew, a Scottish immigrant. He studied at Renfrew, at Upper Canada College, the University of Toronto and the University of Edinburgh. McAndrew was called to the bar in 1885. After his term in office, he served as Chancery taxing officer and then registrar for the Court of Appeal for Ontario.
