= Lotbinière =

Lotbinière may refer to:

== Places ==
- Lotbinière Regional County Municipality, Quebec
  - Lotbinière, Quebec, a municipality
  - Sainte-Agathe-de-Lotbinière, Quebec, a municipality
  - Saint-Édouard-de-Lotbinière, Quebec, a parish
- Lotbinière (federal electoral district), a former federal electoral district in Quebec, Canada (formerly known as Lotbinière—L'Érable), now part of Lotbinière—Chutes-de-la-Chaudière
- Lotbinière (provincial electoral district), a provincial electoral district in Quebec.

== People ==
- Louis-Théandre Chartier de Lotbinière (c. 1612-c. 1688), first de Lotbinière in America and New-France magistrate
- Michel Chartier de Lotbinière, Marquis de Lotbinière (1723–1798), builder of the Fort Ticonderoga and 3rd seigneur of Lotbinière
- Michel-Eustache-Gaspard-Alain Chartier de Lotbinière (1748–1822), military officier, political figure in Lower Canada, seigneur of Rigaud and Vaudreuil and 4th seigneur of Lotbinière.
- Gaspard-Pierre-Gustave Joly de Lotbinière (1798–1865), merchant, first photographer of Athens and Egypt, married to Julie-Christine Chartier de Lotbinière, 5th seigneuresse of Lotbinière
- Antoine Chartier de Lotbinière Harwood (1825–1891), Quebec politician and lawyer and coseigneur of Vaudreuil
- Henri-Gustave Joly de Lotbinière (1829–1908), former Quebec Premier, federal cabinet minister, Lieutenant-Governor of British Columbia and 6th seigneur of Lotbinière
- Seymour de Lotbiniere (Lobby) (1905–1984), director of the British Broadcasting Corporation
