= Jean-Chrysostome Brauneis =

Jean-Chrysostome Brauneis may refer to:

- Jean-Chrysostome Brauneis I (1785–1832), Canadian composer, bandmaster, and music educator of German birth
- Jean-Chrysostome Brauneis II (1814–1871), Canadian composer, organist, and music educator
