= Robert Unwin Harwood =

19th-century Canadian politician

The Honourable Robert Unwin Harwood
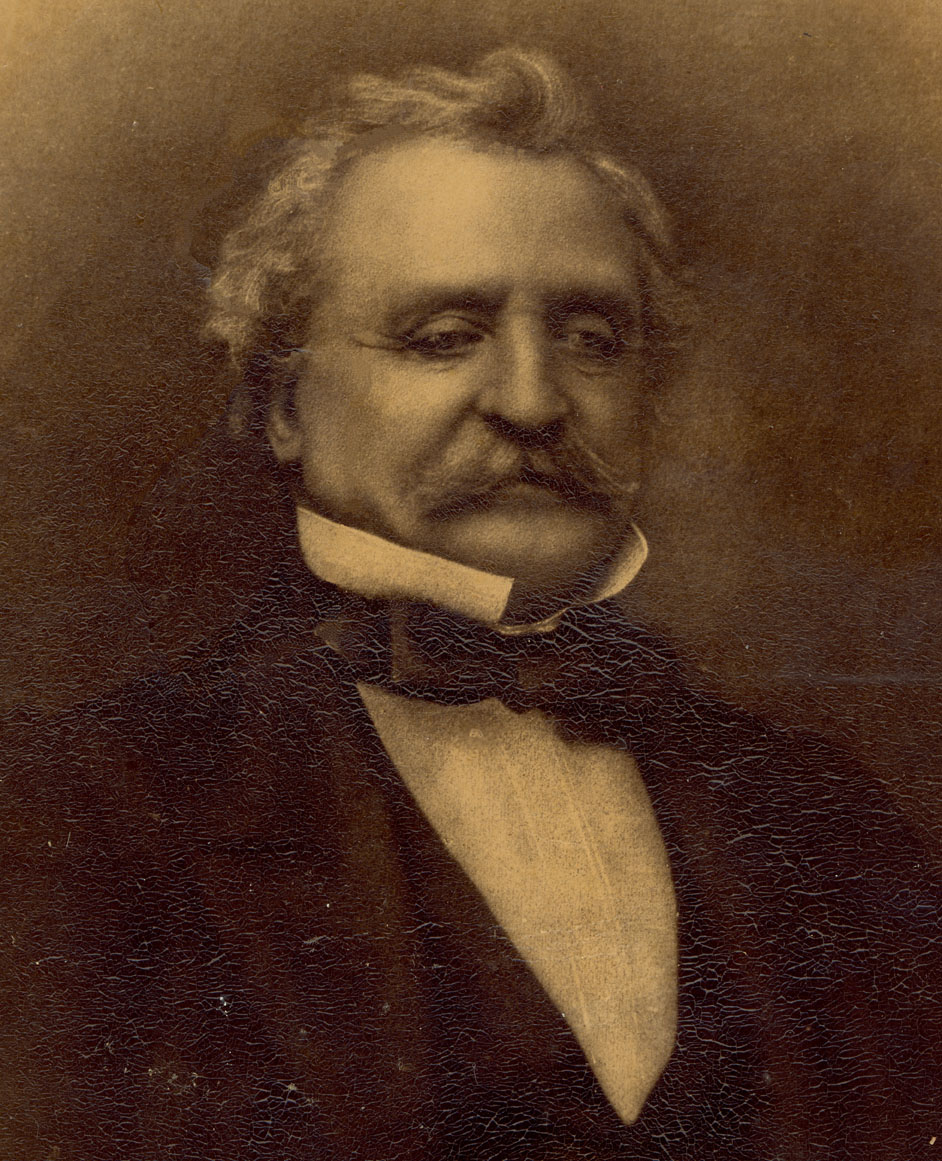

Member of the Legislative Council of Lower Canada
- In office 1832–1838

Member of the Special Council of Lower Canada
- In office 1839–1841

Member of the Legislative Assembly of the Province of Canada for Vaudreuil
- In office 1858–1860

Member of the Legislative Council of the Province of Canada for Rigaud
- In office 1860–1863

Personal details
- Born: 22 January 1798 Sheffield, England
- Died: 12 April 1863 (aged 65) Château Vaudreuil, Canada East
- Party: Moderate/Reform
- Occupation: Seigneur de Vaudreuil

Robert Unwin Harwood (January 22, 1798 – April 12, 1863) was the last seigneur of Vaudreuil, commanding officer of the Vaudreuil Militia, and for thirty years a political figure in Lower Canada and Canada East.

== Arrival in Canada ==
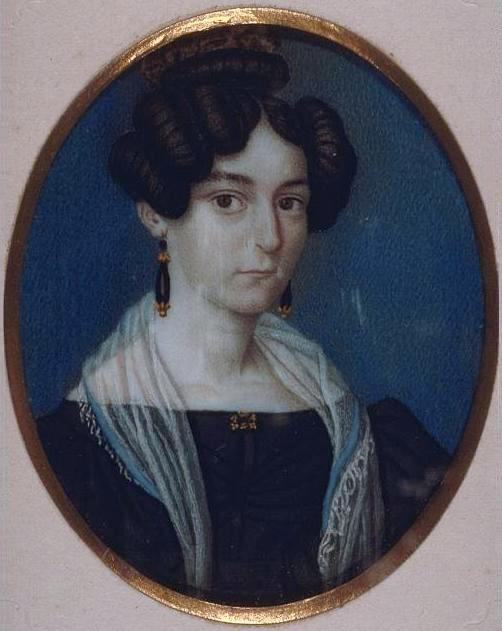
Marie-Louise Josephte (Chartier de Lotbinière) Harwood, Seigneuresse de Vaudreuil; painted by Anson Dickinson c. 1824. Courtesy of McCord Museum

Harwood was christened at Sheffield Cathedral, England, third son of William Harwood and Elizabeth Unwin. Representing William Harwood & Sons — his family's wholesale silver and hardware business in Sheffield that exported to Jamaica, Bermuda, Baltimore and Lower Canada — he came to Montreal in 1821. The obscure young merchant's fortunes were significantly improved when, two years later, he married Marie-Louise Josephte de Lotbinière (1803 - 1869), eldest daughter of Michel-Eustache-Gaspard-Alain Chartier de Lotbinière.

== Politics ==
He was named to the Legislative Council of Lower Canada in 1832 and served until the Lower Canada Rebellion led to the dissolution of the council. He was a member of the Special Council from August 1839 until it was dissolved in 1841. After several unsuccessful attempts, in 1858, he was elected to the Legislative Assembly of the Province of Canada for Vaudreuil; he resigned in 1860 to run (successfully) for a seat in the Legislative Council for Rigaud division. In 1853, Harwood helped found the Vaudreuil Railway Company.

== Seigneur de Vaudreuil ==
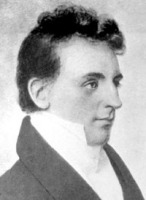
Robert Unwin Harwood, 1824

Despite being an Englishman who had married into the right to be called a seigneur, Harwood was held in great respect by his tenants. Exchanging a life of society and business in Montreal, he and his wife arrived in Vaudreuil in 1829 to bring the estate back to order. Rather than relying on rents as an income he built a large-scale co-operative mill to the great benefit of all those who lived on his land. He gave generously to churches, schools and the needy in Vaudreuil. He described his interest in pursuing reforms in agriculture and transportation as 'a hobby', but he displayed a firm grasp of the problems facing his tenants, and it revealed his genuine concern to improve things.

When it came to collecting his seigneurial dues he preferred leniency to litigation, adding to the respect and admiration that his tenents held for him. His brother in England on the other hand berated him for his liberal attitude writing to him that 'the management of property to advantage is a talent not possessed by many, and certainly not by our family'. But the French-speaking newspaper La Minerve wrote at his death,

Mr Harwood's conduct as a seigneur has been and remains irreproachable... Few seigneurs were as well liked by their censitaires as he was... The Hon. Robt. Harwood was much respected, indulgent to his tenantry, of unspotted reputation, courteous and considerate to all with whom he had relations.

== Chateau Vaudreuil ==
In 1830, Harwood rebuilt the old manor house at Vaudreuil where his wife had grown up, naming the new house 'Chateau Vaudreuil'. It was a large and imposing four-storey stone house on a hill, that burned down in 1870. After Harwood's death, when the Seigneurial system of New France had been abolished, his heirs sold the house and it subsequently became the College de St. Raphael before it was destroyed by fire. After the fire, under the foundation stone a leaden plate stamped with three fleurs de lys was found bearing the French inscription: (requires a source!)

This stone was laid by Lady Louise Elyzabeth de Joybert, wife of the high and powerful Seigneur Philippe de Rigaud (Philippe de Rigaud Vaudreuil), Chevalier, Marquis de Vaudreuil, Grand Cross Order of Saint Louis, Governor and Lieutenant-General to the King of all of New France in 1723, the 15th of March.

Lady Louise de Joybert was the daughter of Pierre de Joybert de Soulanges et de Marson and his wife Marie-Francoise (who died in Paris, 1732), the daughter of Louis-Théandre Chartier de Lotbinière, Mrs Harwood's great-great-great grandfather.

== Family ==
In 1823, at Vaudreuil, Robert Unwin Harwood married Marie-Louise-Josephte Chartier de Lotbinière (1803–1869), the eldest daughter of the Speaker of the House of Commons, Michel-Eustache-Gaspard-Alain Chartier de Lotbinière, and heiress to the Seigneury of Vaudreuil. Her mother, Mary Charlotte Munro, was a daughter of Captain The Hon. John Munro. The Harwood children became known as the de Lotbinière-Harwoods - co-seigneurs of Vaudreuil and first cousins of Sir Henri-Gustave Joly de Lotbinière, Prime Minister of Quebec and Lieutenant Governor of British Columbia. Their children were:

- Lt.-Colonel The Hon. Antoine Chartier de Lotbinière Harwood. He married Angelique Lefebvre de Bellefeuille, daughter of Eustache Antoine de Bellefeuille, Seigneur of Bellefeuille, Quebec, and a niece of John MacDonald of Garth.
- The Hon. Robert William de Lotbinière-Harwood. He married Mary Charlotte McGillis, another niece of John MacDonald of Garth. Their daughter married Major-General Sir Samuel Steele, of Lord Strathcona's Horse. Their son married Marie-Adelaide Masson, niece of The Rt. Hon. Louis-Rodrigue Masson, Lieutenant Governor of Quebec.
- William Bingham de Lotbinière-Harwood, merchant at Montreal.
- Alain Chartier de Lotbinière-Harwood (1836–1912), of Vaudreuil.
- The Hon. Henry Stanislas Harwood, of Vaudreuil and Montreal; father of Louis de Lotbiniere-Harwood.
- Charles Ladislas Harwood (1844–1887), of Vaudreuil.
- Marie-Louise de Lotbinière-Harwood (1830–1904). She married Antoine Eustache de Bellefeuille MacDonald (1828–1894), son of John MacDonald of Garth and nephew of The Hon. William McGillivray and General Sir Archibald Campbell. One son married a daughter of The Hon. Charles-Auguste-Maximilien Globensky and another married Anne Macdonald, niece of Sir William C. Macdonald.
- Marie-Antoinette-Charles de Lotbinière Harwood (1832–1896). In 1857, she married her cousin, The Rt. Hon. Sir Henri-Elzéar Taschereau, Chief Justice of Canada. One of their daughters married a son of The Hon. Joseph-Charles Taché, and another married her first cousin, Brigadier-General Alphonse Eugène Panet.
- Marie-Henriette-Cornélie de Lotbinière-Harwood (died 1878). In 1862, she married Lt.-Colonel The Hon. Charles-Eugène Panet.
- Elizabeth de Lotbinière-Harwood, died unmarried at Vaudreuil.

Robert Unwin Harwood died at Chateau Vaudreuil in 1863, and he and his family are buried in the Chartier de Lotbiniere (subsequently the de Lotbiniere-Harwood) vault at their church, Saint-Michel, Vaudreuil, built by Mrs Harwood's grandfather, Michel Chartier de Lotbinière, Marquis de Lotbinière.
