= Gustave Benjamin Boyer =

Canadian politician

The Hon. Gustave Benjamin Boyer
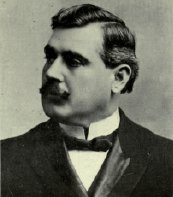

Senator for Rigaud, Quebec
- In office March 11, 1922 – December 2, 1927
- Appointed by: William Lyon Mackenzie King
- Preceded by: Arthur Boyer
- Succeeded by: Lawrence Alexander Wilson

Member of the Canadian Parliament for Vaudreuil-Soulanges
- In office 1917–1921
- Succeeded by: Joseph-Rodolphe Ouimet

Member of the Canadian Parliament for Vaudreuil
- In office 1904–1917
- Preceded by: Henry Stanislas Harwood

Personal details
- Born: November 29, 1871 Saint-Laurent, Quebec
- Died: December 2, 1927 (aged 56)
- Party: Liberal

Gustave Benjamin Boyer (November 29, 1871 – December 2, 1927) was a Canadian journalist and politician.

Born in Saint-Laurent, Quebec, the son of Benjamin Boyer and Angeline Latour, Boyer educated at the College of St. Laurent. He was official lecturer on agriculture in the Province of Quebec and contributed on agricultural questions for the La Patrie and Le Canada. He was first elected to the House of Commons of Canada for the electoral district of Vaudreuil in the general elections of 1904. A Liberal, he was re-elected in 1908, 1911, 1917, and 1921. In 1922, he was called to the Senate of Canada representing the senatorial division of Rigaud, Quebec on the advice of Prime Minister Mackenzie King. He served until his death in 1927. He was also mayor of Rigaud, Quebec in 1907, 1913–1916, and 1918–1919.

== Electoral record ==
1904 Canadian federal election: Vaudreuil
Party	Candidate	Votes
Liberal	Gustave Benjamin Boyer	1,297
Conservative	François de Sales-Alphonse Bastien	825

1908 Canadian federal election: Vaudreuil
Party	Candidate	Votes
Liberal	Gustave Benjamin Boyer	1,408
Conservative	Elzéar Montpetit	655

1911 Canadian federal election: Vaudreuil
Party	Candidate	Votes
Liberal	Gustave Benjamin Boyer	1,345
Conservative	Archibald de Léry Macdonald	1,130

1917 Canadian federal election
Party	Candidate	Votes	%
Opposition (Laurier Liberals)	Gustave Benjamin Boyer	4,075	90.90
Government (Unionist)	Julien-Firmin Bissonnette	408	9.10
Total valid votes		4,483	100.00

1921 Canadian federal election: Vaudreuil—Soulanges
Party	Candidate	Votes	%	±%
Liberal	Gustave Benjamin Boyer	5,366	63.53	-27.37
Independent	Adrien Pharand	2,787	33.00	
Progressive	Julien Charlebois	293	3.47	
Total valid votes		8,446	100.00	
