= Michel-Eustache-Gaspard-Alain Chartier de Lotbinière =

Canadian politician (1748 – 1822)

The Honourable Alain Chartier de Lotbinière
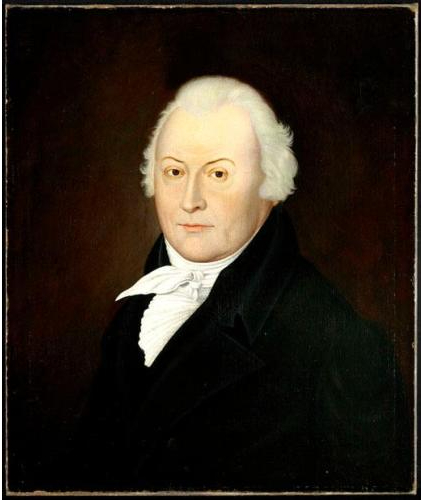

Member of the Legislative Assembly of Lower Canada for York
- In office 1792–1794

Speaker of the Legislative Assembly of Lower Canada
- In office 1794–1796

Member of the Legislative Council of Lower Canada
- In office 1796–1797

Personal details
- Born: 31 August 1748 Quebec City, New France
- Died: 1 January 1822 (aged 73) Montreal, Lower Canada
- Occupation: Seigneur

Michel-Eustache-Gaspard-Alain Chartier de Lotbinière (French pronunciation: [miʃɛl østaʃ ɡaspaʁ alɛ̃ ʃaʁtje də lɔtbinjɛʁ]; August 31, 1748 – January 1, 1822), 2nd Marquis de Lotbinière, though to keep political favour with the British he never used the title. He was seigneur of Vaudreuil, Lotbinière and Rigaud. He was the Speaker of the Legislative Assembly of Lower Canada who saw to it that the French language was recognised as equal to English in the Quebec Parliament, where a painting of him giving the speech still hangs above the Speaker's chair.

== Family ==
Born in the Quebec City in 1748, he was the son of Michel Chartier de Lotbinière, 1st Marquis de Lotbinière, and his wife Louise-Madeleine (1726–1809), daughter of Gaspard-Joseph Chaussegros de Léry (1682–1756), engineer-in-chief of New France. He was one of a distinguished group of first cousins that included The Hon. Antoine Juchereau Duchesnay, François-Joseph Chaussegros, Vicomte de Léry, Mme Jacques-Philippe Saveuse de Beaujeu, The Hon. Louis-René Chaussegros de Léry and The Hon. Charles-Étienne Chaussegros de Léry. He was the brother-in-law of The Hon. Pierre-Amable de Bonne. De Lotbinière inherited the title Marquis de Lotbinière in 1798, but he never used it. This choice was probably to keep political favor with the new rulers of Canada as his father had been in constant and open opposition to British rule for which in 1784 he had been awarded the Marquisate.

== Military life ==
Aged eleven, he served as a cadet during the Siege of Quebec in 1759. The following year he was gazetted second ensign with the French Army when they were stationed in Montreal before accompanying his father to France. In France, he resumed his studies with the thought of joining the French cavalry, but following the Treaty of Paris (1763) and the consequent loss of his father's land in America, he returned to Quebec and was commissioned as a military surveyor in 1768.

From 1770, his father had incurred many debts, so with the financial help of his father's friend Charles-François Tarieu de La Naudière, he kept the seigneuries of Lotbiniere, Vaudreuil, Rigaud and Rigaud de Vaudreuil (which he sold in 1772 to his uncle, Gaspard-Joseph Chaussegros de Léry) in the family by purchasing them from his father. Although only in his early twenties, through his immense properties, prestigious name and family connections he was now one of the most influential Canadian seigneurs.

Unlike his father, he immediately recognised the importance of working with the British and he therefore adapted himself to the circumstances in which he found himself. After the American invasion of Montreal in 1775, he was one of the first Canadian seigneurs to offer his services to the Governor Guy Carleton, 1st Baron Dorchester. He helped to defend Fort St Johns (later Saint-Jean-sur-Richelieu) against the Americans, but was captured and taken prisoner by them and removed to Albany, New York. It was during this time that he developed a strong friendship with William Bingham, whose only son later went on to marry one of his daughters. He was released in 1776, and on returning to Montreal in 1777, having won Carleton's trust, he was appointed a Justice of the Peace. He continued to serve in the Canadian militia and in 1794 became Lieutenant-Colonel of the Vaudreuil Battalion of Militia. In 1803, he was made a full Colonel, finally retiring from the militia in 1818. He died at his home in Montreal, 1822.

== Language debate, 1793 ==
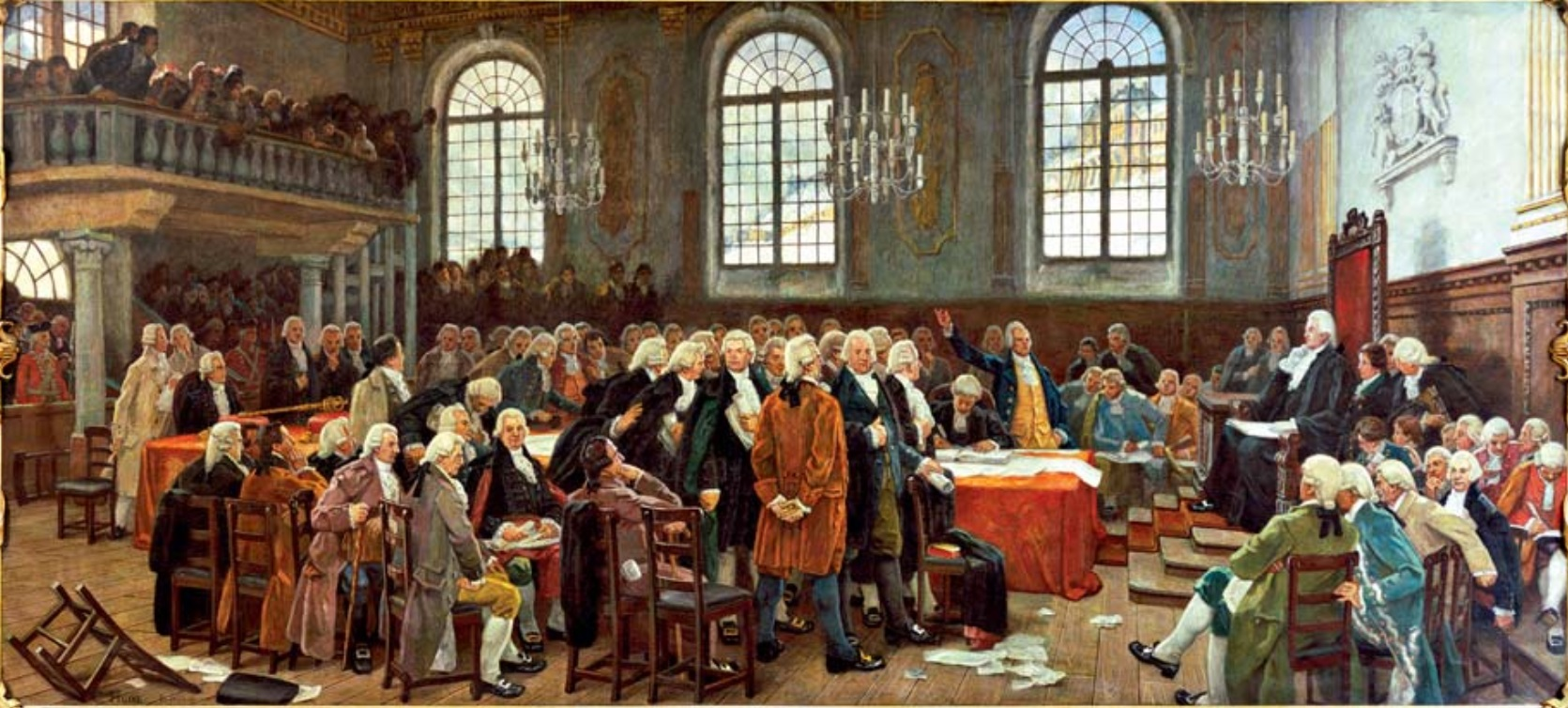
Charles Huot's depiction of Lotbinière giving his famous speech in Le débat sur les langues, 1793

In the Legislative Assembly of Lower Canada, Lotbinière was elected Speaker in the 1st Parliament of Lower Canada, having entered with his brother-in-law, Pierre-Amable de Bonne, for the riding of York which took in his seigneuries of Vaudreuil and Rigaud, Quebec. Politically he is best remembered for his role in sanctioning the use of French in the Parliamentary records. The moment is captured in a painting by Charles Huot which hangs above the Speaker's Chair in the present-day National Assembly of Quebec. In this speech, recorded in the Quebec Gazette on 31 January 1793, he asked for French and English to be given equal recognition in the House,

Since the majority of our constituents are placed in a special situation, we are obliged to depart from the ordinary rules and forced to ask for the use of a language which is not that of the empire; but, being as fair to others as we hope they will be to us, we should not want our language eventually to banish that of His Majesty's other subjects.

== Three heiresses ==
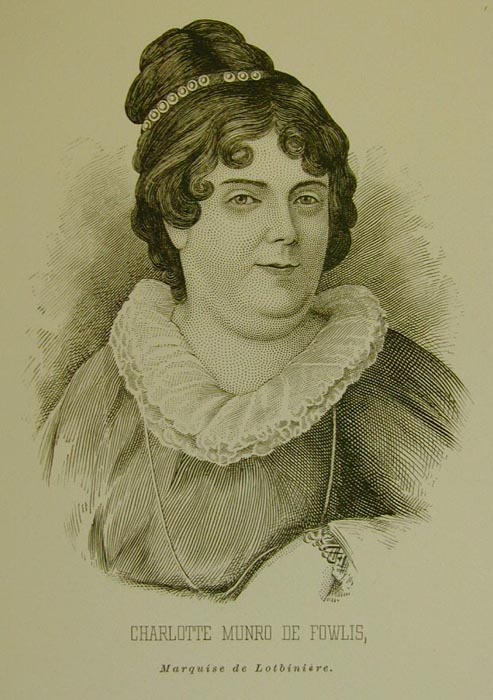
Charlotte (Munro) Chartier de Lotbinière, the mother of Lotbinière's three children

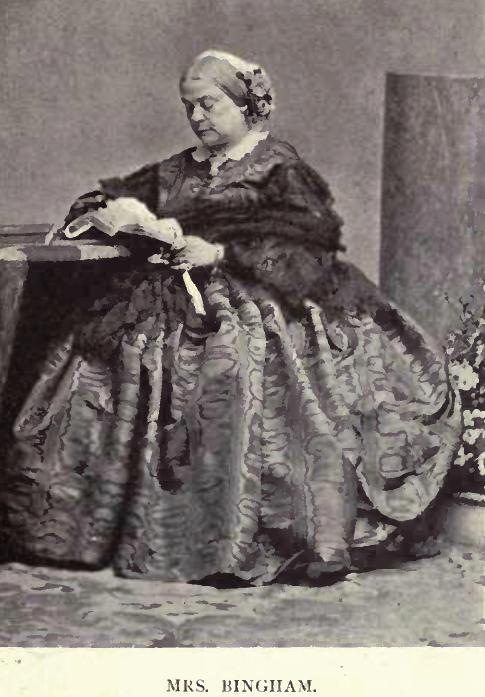
Mrs Marie Charlotte Bingham, wife of William Bingham

Chartier de Lotbinière was married twice. In 1770, he married Josette, sister of Lt.-Colonel Joseph-Marie Godefroy de Tonnancour. She died without children in 1799. In 1802, at Vaudreuil, he married Mary Charlotte Munro (1776–1834), the youngest daughter of Captain The Hon. John Munro of Fowlis and his wife Marie Talbot Gilbert Brouwer, of Albany, New York. They were the parents of three daughters, the heiresses who were known in Quebec as The Three Graces or Les Trois Cannelles.

- Their eldest daughter, Louise-Josephte (1803–1869), chose the family home of Vaudreuil as her dowry and married Robert Unwin Harwood. They were the parents of ten children, from whom descend the de Lotbinière-Harwood family.
- Their second daughter, Marie-Charlotte (1805–1866), was given Rigaud as her dowry. In 1821, she married the American millionaire, William Bingham (whose sister was married to Alexander Baring, 1st Baron Ashburton), the only son of Senator William Bingham of Philadelphia (an old friend of Charlotte's father), and his wife Ann Willing Bingham, daughter of Thomas Willing. They lived at Montreal in the house that would become Donegana's Hotel before moving to Paris, and later separated. He remained in Paris and she died at Oxford Terrace in London. They were the parents of two sons who died in early manhood and three daughters. All three daughters lived in France and married French Counts. The youngest, Georgina, married Count Raoul d'Eprémesnil, grandson of Jean-Jacques Duval d'Eprémesnil. The Seigneury of Rigaud was passed to Charlotte's eldest niece, Marie-Louise de Lotbinière-Harwood who married Antoine Eustache de Bellefeuille MacDonald, son of John MacDonald of Garth.
- Their youngest daughter, Julie-Christine (1810–1887), was given Lotbinière as her dowry, and she married Gaspard-Pierre-Gustave Joly de Lotbinière, the first man to photograph the Acropolis. They were the parents of a daughter and two sons. Their second son, Edmond, was killed at the Siege of Lucknow. From the eldest son, Sir Henri-Gustave Joly de Lotbinière, grandfather of Seymour de Lotbiniere, descend the Joly de Lotbinière family.

His grandsons, Antoine Chartier de Lotbinière Harwood and Henri-Gustave Joly de Lotbinière, both later became members of the legislative assembly for Canada East and then Quebec. Joly de Lotbinière also served as Prime Minister of Quebec and Lieutenant Governor of British Columbia. Two more grandsons, Robert Harwood and Henry Stanislas Harwood were Members of Parliament for Vaudreuil.

== See also ==
- Canadian Hereditary Peers
