= Donald McMillan (Quebec politician) =

Canadian politician

Donald McMillan (1807 – July 15, 1876) was a Canadian businessman and political figure. He represented Vaudreuil in the 1st Canadian Parliament as a Conservative member.

He was born in Scotland in 1807, the son of Hugh McMillan, and came to Glengarry County in Upper Canada in 1823. He married Olympe Mongenais. McMillan later moved to Rigaud, where he sold flour and feed. He also served as lieutenant-colonel in the local militia. He died at Rigaud in 1876.

His son Hugh also later represented Vaudreuil in the House of Commons.

== Electoral record ==
1867 Canadian federal election: Vaudreuil
Party	Candidate	Votes
Conservative	Donald McMillan	acclaimed
Source: Canadian Elections Database

Parliament of Canada
Preceded by None	Member of Parliament from Vaudreuil; 1867–1872	Succeeded by Robert William Harwood
