= Jean-Chrysostome Brauneis I =

Canadian composer, bandmaster and music educator

Jean-Chrysostome Brauneis I, sometimes referred to as John-Chrysostome Brauneis I (1785 – 15 September 1832, Quebec City), was a Canadian composer, bandmaster, and music educator of German birth. His compositional output mainly consisted of works for military bands. His best known work, Grand Overture of Quebec, was written in honour of Lady Mary Lennox, the daughter of the Duke of Richmond. It was first performed by the British Army's 60th Foot Regiment band on the occasion of the Duke of Richmond's visit to the Government House in Quebec City in February 1819.

== Life and career ==
Born in Germany, Brauneis was baptized soon after his birth on 29 March 1785 at Herrnsheim, near Worms. Trained as a musician in his native country, he joined the British Army's 70th Foot Regiment band with whom he traveled to Quebec City in 1813. After serving in the band in Upper Canada for five years, he resigned from his position in 1818 to become a music teacher in Quebec City where he gave instruction on the piano among other instruments.

Brauneis was appointed director of the Régiment d'artillerie band, a popular artillery battalion band in Quebec in 1831. One of the musicians in the band, Charles Sauvageau, was also his pupil. He died the following year; a victim of the 1832 cholera epidemic. His son, Jean-Chrysostome Brauneis II, was an important musician and teacher in Quebec City. His granddaughter, Marie-Josephine Sydney, was married to politician Henry Stanislas Harwood, and his great-grandson was the well known Canadian gynecologist Louis de Lotbiniere-Harwood.
