= Nick Discepola =

Italian-born Canadian politician and businessman

Member of Parliament for Vaudreuil-Soulanges
- In office October 25, 1993 – June 28, 2004
- Preceded by: Pierre Cadieux
- Succeeded by: Meili Faille

Personal details
- Born: November 27, 1949 Avellino, Italy
- Died: November 21, 2012 (aged 62) Toronto, Ontario, Canada
- Party: Liberal
- Spouse: Mary-Alice Discepola
- Children: Lisa Discepola, Marco Discepola, Laura Discepola, Michele Discepola

Nunzio "Nick" Discepola (November 27, 1949 – November 21, 2012) was an Italian-born Canadian politician and businessman.

== Education and career ==
Discepola obtained a Bachelor of Science (1972) and a Master of Business Administration (1977) from McGill University.

Before founding his own company in the high tech sector "N.D. Computer Resources" at the age of 26, he worked for Bell Canada and the federal government as a computer specialist.

From 1989 to 1992 he served as mayor of Kirkland, Quebec.

Discepola was a Member of Parliament representing the Liberal Party of Canada in the House of Commons of Canada in the riding of Vaudreuil from 1993 to 1997 (serving as Parliamentary Secretary to the Solicitor General from 1996 to 1998), and then Vaudreuil-Soulanges between 1997 and 2004. In 2004, he lost his seat to the Bloc Québécois's Meili Faille.

Discepola died on November 21, 2012, of cancer six days shy of his 63rd birthday.

== Electoral record ==
1993 Canadian federal election: Vaudreuil
Party	Candidate	Votes
Liberal	Nick Discepola	31,120
Bloc Québécois	Mario Turbide	25,133
Progressive Conservative	Richard Préfontaine	6,459
New Democratic	Yves Marie Christin	1,107
Natural Law	Eric E. Simon	727
Libertarian	Neal Ford	438
Commonwealth of Canada	Robert Charles	186
