= Lawrence Alexander Wilson =

Canadian politician

The Hon. Lawrence Alexander Wilson
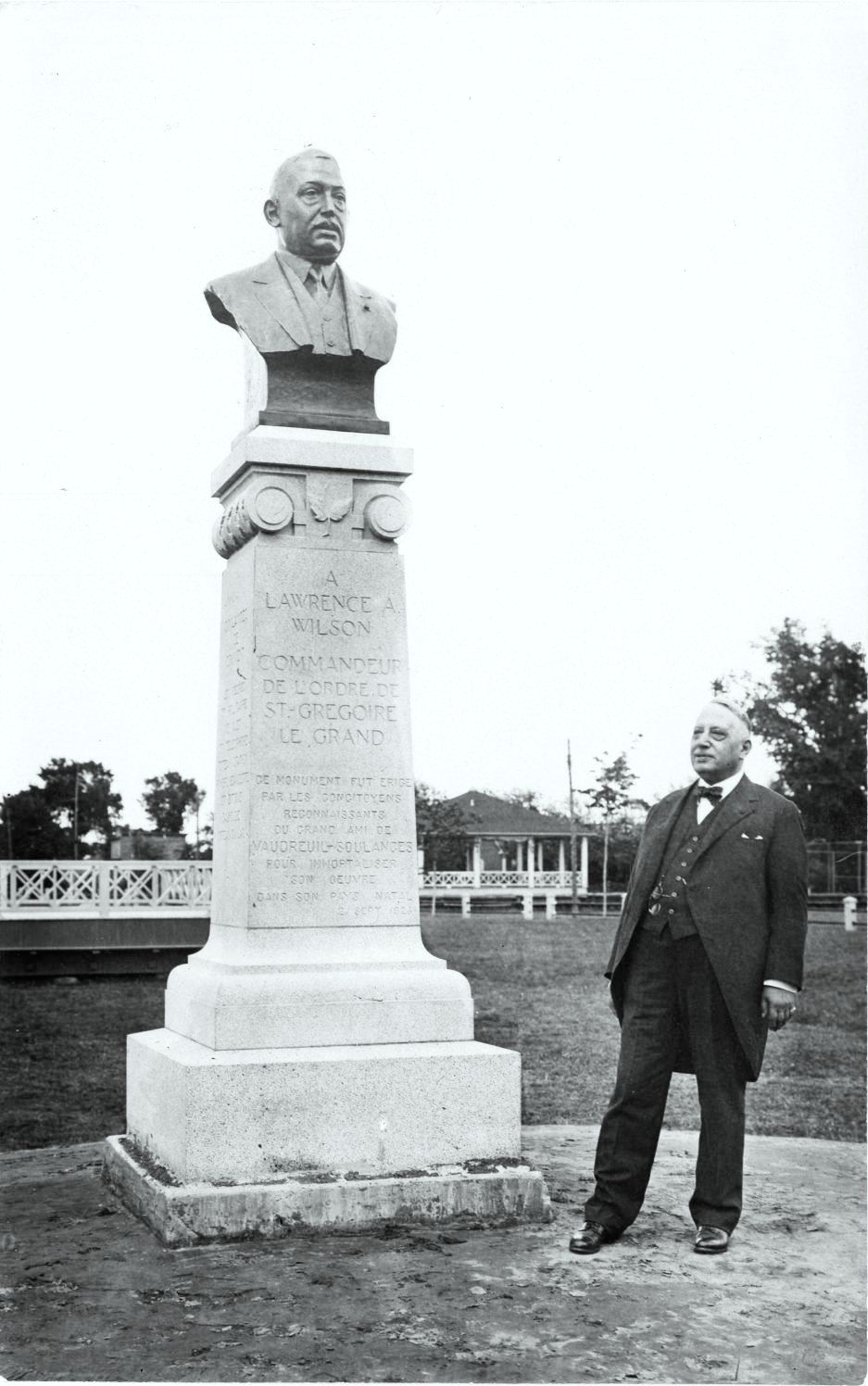

Member of the Canadian Parliament for Vaudreuil—Soulanges
- In office 1925–1929
- Preceded by: Joseph-Rodolphe Ouimet
- Succeeded by: Joseph Thauvette

Senator for Rigaud, Quebec
- In office 1930–1934
- Appointed by: William Lyon Mackenzie King
- Preceded by: Gustave Benjamin Boyer
- Succeeded by: Arthur Sauvé

Personal details
- Born: June 14, 1863 Montreal, Canada East
- Died: March 3, 1934 (aged 70)
- Party: Liberal

Lawrence Alexander Wilson (June 14, 1863 – March 3, 1934) was a Quebec business, philanthropic and political figure. He was prominent in the Coteau-du-Lac, Quebec and the Soulanges region.

The Wilson family came from Aberdeen, Scotland and settled in Lower Canada in the nineteenth century. Lawrence Alexander Wilson was born in Montreal, Lower Canada. From 1889 to 1921 he built up a business as a wholesale wine and liquor merchant.

In 1906, he founded the Quebec Land Company, a property development firm.

He entered politics in the 1920s and was elected to the House of Commons of Canada in the 1925 federal election as the Liberal MP for Vaudreuil—Soulanges and was re-elected in 1926 federal election. Wilson resigned his seat in February 1929 intending to retire from politics but was persuaded to run in the by-election to succeed himself and was returned to the House of Commons in July 1929.

Wilson was appointed to the Senate of Canada by William Lyon Mackenzie King in June 1930 and died in office four years later.

In 1923, Wilson donated part of his property to the town of Coteau-du-Lac for the creation of a park and $5,000 to construct a pavilion which was named after him.

Wilson's brother-in-law was Quebec legislator Maurice Perrault.

Canadian federal by-election, 29 July 1929
Party	Candidate	Votes	%	±%
On Mr. Wilson's resignation, 1 February 1929
Liberal	Lawrence Alexander Wilson	4,409	68.03	-6.44
Independent Liberal	Roland-Gilles Mousseau	1,766	27.25	
Independent Liberal	Émile Gagné	306	4.72	
Total valid votes		6,481	100.00	

1926 Canadian federal election: Vaudreuil—Soulanges
Party	Candidate	Votes	%	±%
Liberal	Lawrence Alexander Wilson	5,391	74.47	-2.23
Conservative	Eugène Leroux	1,848	25.53	+2.23
Total valid votes		7,239	100.00	

1925 Canadian federal election: Vaudreuil—Soulanges
Party	Candidate	Votes	%	±%
Liberal	Lawrence Alexander Wilson	5,554	76.70	+13.17
Conservative	Eugène Leroux	1,687	23.30	
Total valid votes		7,241	100.00	

Note: Change in popular vote is calculated from popular vote in the 1921 general election.
