= Louis de Lotbiniere-Harwood =

Canadian gynaecologist

Louis de Lotbinière-Harwood
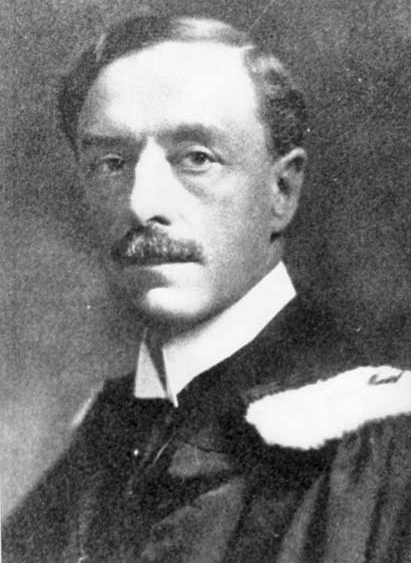

Dean of Medicine at Université de Montréal
- In office 1918–1934

President of the Hôpital Notre-Dame

President of L'Union Médicale du Canada

Personal details
- Born: 27 April 1866 Manor of Vaudreuil, Canada East
- Died: 15 May 1934 (aged 68) 564 Sherbrooke Street, Montreal

Louis de Lotbinière-Harwood (1866–1934) F.A.C.S., was a Canadian gynaecologist. He was Dean of Medicine at Université de Montréal, the second campus of Université Laval. He was President of the Medical Union of Canada, President of the Hôpital Notre-Dame and President of the Radium Institute, Paris. His reputation as an educator and a surgeon extended throughout North America and Europe, recognised through his creation as an Officier de Le Légion d'honneur in France. He has been referred to as the 'Father of Canadian Gynaecology'.

== Early life ==
Born at the Manor of Vaudreuil, he was the son of the Hon. Henry Stanislas Harwood and his wife Josephine Sydney Brauneis, daughter of Jean-Chrysostome Brauneis II. He was a nephew of Antoine Chartier de Lotbinière Harwood, Robert Harwood and Sir Henri Elzéar Taschereau, and a first cousin of the wife of Major-General Sir Sam Steele.

De Lotbiniere-Harwood was educated at the Séminaire de Ste-Thérèse and afterwards at the Séminaire de Rigaud. In 1890, de Lotbiniere-Harwood graduated in medicine from Université Laval, Quebec City. In 1894, he went to Europe to take a course of advanced studies, particularly gynaecology. In France, he had the opportunity to study under, and serve as the assistant to, Samuel Jean de Pozzi, who was then France's foremost gynaecologist and would remain his mentor.

== Career ==
Returning to Montreal in 1896, de Lotbinière-Harwood was appointed assistant gynaecologist at the Hôpital Notre-Dame under Dr Brennan, until Brennan's death in 1903 when he became the head gynaecologist. During World War I, he was the moving spirit in the patriotic effort that resulted in the foundation of the General Military Hospital of Laval located at Joinville-le-Pont near Paris.

He was widely regarded as the accredited international link between the English and French members of his profession, and France rewarded him for this by making him an Officer of the Légion d'honneur. He was one of the promoters of the conference of French-speaking members of the medical profession which was first held in Montreal and was attended by all the prominent French doctors of the day in Europe and North America.

He held several the prominent office: Dean of the Medical Faculty of University of Montreal (1918); Professor of Gynaecology at the University of Montreal; Superintendent of the University Council; President of the Hôpital Notre-Dame; President of the Radium Institute, Paris; corresponding Secretary of the Surgical Society of Paris; Vice-President of the Royal College of Physicians and Surgeons of Canada; Vice-President of the Association of French-speaking Doctors of North America; Fellow of the American College of Surgeons; member of the General Board of Examiners; President of the Medical Union of Canada and vice-president of the Cercle Universitaire. He was a director of and a contributor to L'Union Medicale du Canada for fifteen years. A contemporary at the University of Montreal (where some described him as the 'Father of Canadian Gynaecology') said of him,

A charming man, never reading, in no way devoted to letters, he yet possessed an untiring activity, a great ambition, a talent for action and government which made him a remarkable dean. One need not look for his writings, he wrote little. One need not analyse his teaching, he made scarcely more of this. But, with the help of his friends, he reorganised the Faculty of Medicine, accomplished the reconstruction of the Notre-Dame Hospital, and in the direction of the University of Montreal, he took a leading part... His charm and his distinguished manners had gained for him the respect of every one whom he met. His high stature, the dignity of his bearing, the distinction of his gesture commanded general attention... a gentleman with all the meaning that this word implies... Gifted with great executive ability, a nimble mind, tact and unusual charm of manner, he would seem to have been destined for pre-eminence in any station.

== Family ==
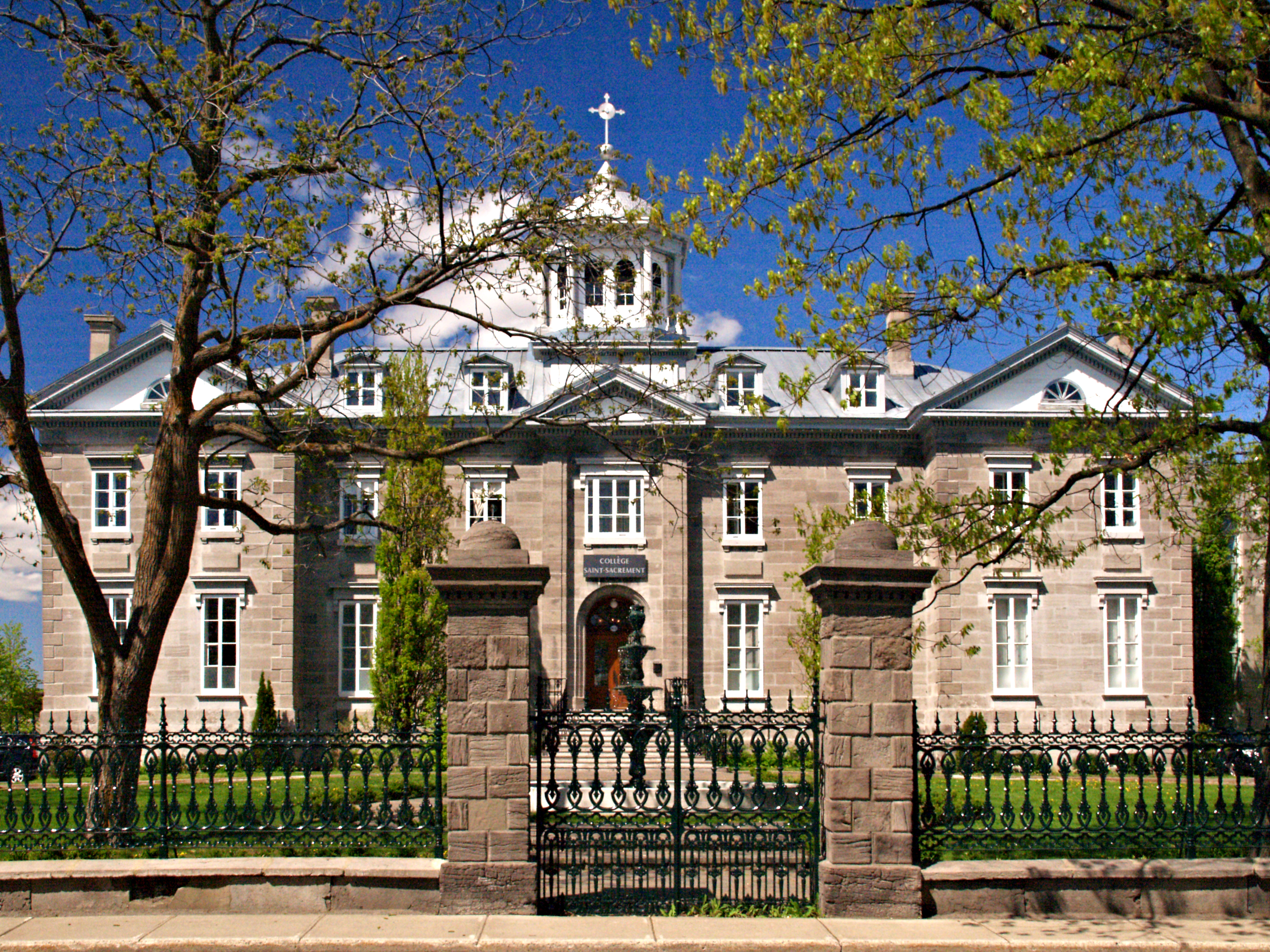
Château de Terrebonne, the childhood home of his first wife who was also his cousin

De Lotbinière-Harwood was a farmer and cattle breeder. He was vice-president of the Holstein (cattle) Breeders Association of Quebec, and his farm where he lived at Vaudreuil, Het Loo, was noted for its fine herd of Holstein-Friesen cattle.

He was married three times. In 1891, he married his cousin, Marie-Berthe-Adéline Masson (1871-1904), daughter of Henri Masson (1836-1880) and Coralie Globensky, niece of Lt.-Colonel Maximilien Globensky. She was a granddaughter of Joseph Masson of Château de Terrebonne, and the stepdaughter of another of his relations, Sir Henri-Thomas Taschereau, brother of Louis-Alexandre Taschereau, Prime Minister of Quebec. She died while travelling in Europe at Paris. They were the parents of two sons, Robert and Joseph Henri Masson de Lotbiniere-Harwood. and two daughters, Mrs Jean-Georges Bernard de Languedoc and Mrs Charles Frederick Clouston Porteous, both of Montreal, Quebec. Colonel Porteous was a first cousin through his mother's family, the Drurys, of Lady Beaverbrook.

He next married another cousin, Catherine Delphine de Bellefeuille-MacDonald of Alexandria, Ontario. His third wife, Marie-Berthe Brosseau (1883-1958), was a cousin of his first wife, daughter of Joseph Brosseau and Louise de Castonguay. She had three children by him: William, Pierre and Marie-Berthe de Lotbinière Harwood. His youngest daughter was married twice: firstly at Montreal to William Campbell James Meredith; secondly in London to Cyril Bertram Mills (1902–1991). De Lotbinière-Harwood is buried with his three wives and two eldest daughters at the Mount Royal Cemetery.

== See also ==
- Dr L. deL. Harwood Prefers Developing Institutions Already in Operation, 1925
- Montreal Lauded as Example of Two Races Living in Harmony Under One Flag, 1929
- City Welcomes French Doctors, 1930
- Inauguration of Notre Dame Addition Attracts Distinguished Citizens, 1932
- American College of Physicians in Convention Here, 1933
