= Hugh McMillan (politician) =

Canadian politician

Hugh McMillan (19 December 1839 – 31 October 1895) was a Quebec businessman and political figure. He represented Vaudreuil in the House of Commons of Canada as a Conservative member from 1883 to 1891 and from 1892 to 1893.

McMillan was born in Rigaud, Lower Canada, the son of Donald McMillan and Olympe Mongenais. He served on the county council and was a captain in the local militia. In 1862, he married Agnes Mongenais, the daughter of Jean-Baptiste Mongenais, who was then representing Vaudreuil in the Legislative Assembly of the Province of Canada. From 1865 to 1873, McMillan ran the grain and feed business established by his father at Rigaud, later building and operating a sawmill there. He died in Rigaud at the age of 55.

== Electoral record ==
1882 Canadian federal election: Vaudreuil
| Party | Candidate | Votes |
|---|---|---|
| Conservative | Hugh McMillan | 522 |
| Unknown | Alfred Lapointe | 490 |
| Unknown | F.X. Archambault | 418 |
| Unknown | H.A. Desrosiers | 10 |

1887 Canadian federal election: Vaudreuil
| Party | Candidate | Votes |
|---|---|---|
| Conservative | Hugh McMillan | 996 |
| Liberal | E. Lalonde | 783 |

1891 Canadian federal election: Vaudreuil
| Party | Candidate | Votes |
|---|---|---|
| Liberal | Henry Stanislas Harwood | 1,087 |
| Conservative | Hugh McMillan | 989 |

By-election on 29 February 1892 On Mr. Harwood being unseated, 8 January 1892
| Party | Candidate | Votes |
| Conservative | Hugh McMillan | acclaimed |

Parliament of Canada
| Preceded by Jean-Baptiste Mongenais | Member of Parliament for Vaudreuil; 1882–1891 | Succeeded by Henry Stanislas Harwood |
| Preceded by Henry Stanislas Harwood | Member of Parliament for Vaudreuil; 1892–1893 | Succeeded by Henry Stanislas Harwood |
