= Joseph Thauvette =

Canadian politician

Member of Parliament for Vaudreuil-Soulanges
- In office July 1930 – April 1945
- Preceded by: Lawrence Alexander Wilson
- Succeeded by: Louis-René Beaudoin

Personal details
- Born: 8 July 1876 Les Cèdres, Quebec, Canada
- Died: 24 November 1955 (aged 79)
- Party: Liberal
- Spouse(s): Alma Legault m. 17 September 1901
- Profession: physician

Joseph Thauvette (8 July 1876 – 24 November 1955) was a Liberal party member of the House of Commons of Canada. He was born in Les Cèdres, Quebec, and became a physician by career.

== Education ==
Thauvette attended Bourget College in Rigaud where he received a Bachelor of Science degree.

== Career ==
Thauvette served as mayor of Vaudreuil, Quebec.

He was first elected to Parliament at the Vaudreuil—Soulanges riding in the 1930 general election and re-elected there in 1935 and 1940. After completing his term in the 19th Canadian Parliament, Thauvette did not seek re-election in 1945.

== Electoral record ==
1940 Canadian federal election: Vaudreuil—Soulanges
Party	Candidate	Votes	%	±%
Liberal	Joseph Thauvette	4,381	48.19	-19.95
National Government	J.-E.-Philippe Deguire	2,210	24.31	-4.38
Independent Liberal	Édouard Charlebois	1,441	15.85	
Independent Liberal	J.-Ernest Chevrier	1,059	11.65	
Total valid votes		9,091	100.00	

Note: "National Government" vote is compared to Conservative vote in 1935 election.

1935 Canadian federal election: Vaudreuil—Soulanges
Party	Candidate	Votes	%	±%
Liberal	Joseph Thauvette	5,983	68.14	+17.17
Conservative	Horace-Joseph Gagné	2,519	28.69	-0.05
Reconstruction	Albert Lacombe	279	3.18	
Total valid votes		8,781	100.00	

1930 Canadian federal election: Vaudreuil—Soulanges
Party	Candidate	Votes	%	±%
Liberal	Joseph Thauvette	4,313	50.96	-17.07
Conservative	Horace-Joseph Gagné	2,432	28.74	
Independent Liberal	Roland-Gilles Mousseau	1,718	20.30	-6.95
Total valid votes		8,463	100.00	
