= Hal Herbert =

Canadian politician

Member of Parliament for Vaudreuil
- In office October 30, 1972 – September 3, 1984
- Preceded by: René Émard
- Succeeded by: Pierre Cadieux

Personal details
- Born: June 17, 1922 London, England
- Died: July 25, 2003 (aged 81) Canada
- Party: Liberal
- Spouse: Madeleine Lemieux Herbert
- Children: Louise Herbert and Thomas Herbert
- Committees: Chairman, Standing Committee on Finance, Trade and Economic Affairs (1973-1974)
- Portfolio: Parliamentary Secretary to the Minister of Public Works (1978-1979); Parliamentary Secretary to the Minister of State for Urban Affairs (1978-1979); Deputy Chair of Committees of the Whole (1984)

Harold Thomas Herbert (June 17, 1922 – July 25, 2003) was a British-born Canadian politician. He introduced the Private Member's Bill in 1982 which amended the Holidays Act to change the name of Canada's national holiday from "Dominion Day" to "Canada Day".

Born in London, England, he joined the Royal Air Force in 1940 and took flight training in Canada in 1941. During the World War II, he flew Spitfires on high-altitude photo-reconnaissance trips and was awarded a Distinguished Flying Cross. After the war, he studied engineering in Scotland and moved to Canada in 1948. He eventually became a partner with a Montreal construction firm.

He was elected to the House of Commons of Canada in the 1972 federal election representing the riding of Vaudreuil. A Liberal, he was re-elected in 1974, 1979, and 1980. He was defeated in 1984. In 1978, he was the Parliamentary Secretary to the Minister of State for Urban Affairs and Parliamentary Secretary to the Minister of Public Works. In 1984, he was the Deputy Chair of Committees of the Whole.

== Electoral record ==
1972 Canadian federal election: Vaudreuil
Party	Candidate	Votes
Liberal	Hal Herbert	27,372
Progressive Conservative	Jeannette-T. Burley	11,477
Social Credit	Joseph-Endré De Csavossy	4,526
New Democratic	Michel Beauséjour	3,573
Independent	André Théoret	3,066
Independent	Walter J. Williams	330

1974 Canadian federal election: Vaudreuil
Party	Candidate	Votes
Liberal	Hal Herbert	29,685
Progressive Conservative	Ron Brown	12,422
New Democratic	Tom Rees	4,397
Social Credit	Sarah Audet	2,752
Independent	Gaëtan Boyer	805

1979 Canadian federal election: Vaudreuil
Party	Candidate	Votes
Liberal	Hal Herbert	41,508
Progressive Conservative	Diana Togneri	7,787
New Democratic	Lorne Brown	4,512
Social Credit	Mario G. Turbide	3,625
Rhinoceros	Claude Simard	1,177
Libertarian	Claude Lévesque	437
Union populaire	Jérome Chaput	237

1980 Canadian federal election: Vaudreuil
Party	Candidate	Votes
Liberal	Hal Herbert	39,159
New Democratic	Lorne Brown	7,309
Progressive Conservative	Thomas Thé	6,277
Union populaire	Guy Cousineau	513
Libertarian	Irena Bubniuk	479
Marxist–Leninist	Michelle Duford	234
lop.parl.ca

1984 Canadian federal election: Vaudreuil
Party	Candidate	Votes
Progressive Conservative	Pierre Cadieux	37,499
Liberal	Hal Herbert	20,362
New Democratic	Anne Erskine	7,993
Rhinoceros	Nicole B.D. Pans	1,470
Parti nationaliste	Benoît Duchesne	1,017
Libertarian	Gordon Gouldson	345
Commonwealth of Canada	Jacques Cartier	139
