= René Émard =

Canadian politician (1914–1984)

Member of Parliament for Vaudreuil
- In office 25 June 1968 – 29 October 1972
- Preceded by: Riding created
- Succeeded by: Hal Herbert

Member of Parliament for Vaudreuil—Soulanges
- In office 8 April 1963 – 24 June 1968
- Preceded by: Marcel Bourbonnais
- Succeeded by: Riding abolished

Personal details
- Born: 1 September 1914 Châteauguay, Quebec, Canada
- Died: 7 June 1984 (aged 69)
- Party: Liberal
- Profession: unionist

René Émard (1 September 1914 – 7 June 1984) was a Liberal party member of the House of Commons of Canada. He was born in Châteauguay, Quebec and worked as a unionist. He served during the Second World War in the Régiment de Maisonneuve and the Régiment de la Chaudière. He was a member of the Canadian occupation force in the Netherlands.

He was first elected in the riding of Vaudreuil—Soulanges in the 1963 general election and re-elected in the same district in the 1965. In the 1968 election, he was elected to a third term in the district of Vaudreuil. Émard retired from Parliament in 1972. He served as mayor of L'Île-Perrot, Quebec from 1977 to 1981.

The Rue René-Émard in Montreal was named in his honour in 1987.

== Electoral record ==
1968 Canadian federal election: Vaudreuil
Party	Candidate	Votes
Liberal	René Émard	29,830
Progressive Conservative	Harold G. Fairhead	7,654
New Democratic	Maurice Daviau	2,905

1965 Canadian federal election: Vaudreuil—Soulanges
Party	Candidate	Votes	%	±%
Liberal	René Émard	8,955	50.79	+1.04
Progressive Conservative	Marcel Bourbonnais	6,580	37.32	+2.59
New Democratic	Roger Carrier	1,346	7.63	
Ralliement créditiste	Jean-Marie Veilleux	750	4.25	-9.22
Total valid votes		17,631	100.00	

Note: Ralliement créditiste vote is compared to Social Credit vote in the 1963 election.

1963 Canadian federal election: Vaudreuil—Soulanges
Party	Candidate	Votes	%	±%
Liberal	René Émard	8,639	49.75	+3.72
Progressive Conservative	J.-Marcel Bourbonnais	6,031	34.73	-12.81
Social Credit	Marcel Lessard	2,340	13.48	+7.05
Independent	Gérard Raymond	354	2.04	
Total valid votes		17,364	100.00	
