= Peter Schiefke =

Canadian environmentalist and politician

Peter Schiefke MP
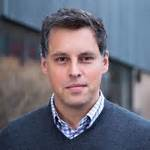
- Schiefke in 2016

Chair of the Canadian House of Commons Standing Committee on Transport, Infrastructure and Communities
- Incumbent
- Assumed office September 2021
- Minister: Omar Alghabra; Pablo Rodriguez; Anita Anand; Chrystia Freeland; Steven MacKinnon
- Preceded by: Vance Badawey

Member of Parliament for Vaudreuil Vaudreuil—Soulanges (2015-2025)
- Incumbent
- Assumed office 19 October 2015
- Preceded by: Jamie Nicholls

Personal details
- Born: April 13, 1979 (age 47) Montreal, Quebec, Canada
- Party: Liberal
- Spouse: Dr. Paula Ruttle
- Education: Concordia University; McGill University
- Profession: Environmentalist

Peter Schiefke MP (born 13 April 1979) is a Canadian environmentalist and Liberal politician, who was elected to represent the riding of Vaudreuil (formerly Vaudreuil-Soulanges) in the House of Commons of Canada in the 2015 federal election.

== Biography ==
Born in Hudson, Quebec, Peter is a graduate of Dalkeith Elementary School and Rosemount High School. He holds a Bachelor of Arts in Political Science from Concordia University and a Master of Science in Renewable Resources from McGill University.

During his time at Concordia University, Peter was actively involved in student life and politics. In 2002, he launched the We Will Always Remember (WWAR) project, aimed at raising awareness among youth of the sacrifices made by Canadian service men and women around the world, for which he received the Minister of Veterans Affairs Commendation in 2003. In 2006, he and fellow political science student Awel Uwihanganye founded the Concordia Volunteer Abroad Program (CVAP), now known as Community, Empowerment, Education, Development (CEED). He served as the Executive Director of the organization for 4 years, until he left to pursue his graduate studies at McGill university. Twenty years later, the organization still organizes cooperation and development projects in the Gulu region of Uganda.

Peter Schiefke also co-founded Youth Action Montreal in 2006 with fellow political science student, Mohamed Shuriye, to promote the engagement of Montreal college and university students in sustainable development and environmental protection. In 2007, this organization organized the conference "Less Talk, More Action: A Youth Summit on Climate Change", which was headlined by former American Vice President Al Gore and Canadian scientist and environmental activist Dr. David Suzuki. The event brought together thousands of people at the Palais des congrès de Montréal. In 2009, he was appointed National Director of The Climate Reality Project Canada Foundation, founded by Al Gore, and after his 5 year term was appointed to the Board of Directors.

During his time as an undergraduate university student, Peter was also a member of the Quebec pop group INMOTION. From September 2000 to October 2004, INMOTION had some success, performing over 170 shows, appearing on the Radio-Canada television program La Fureur, and reaching the number one spot on the Quebec francophone radio charts for the groups’ second single, “Sauve Moi”.

At the time of the 2025 Canadian federal election, he lived in Vaudreuil-sur-le-Lac.

== Political career ==
Peter Schiefke ran for the Liberal Party of Canada nomination in Vaudreuil-Soulanges in July 2014, with the federal election scheduled for the following year. On the of 24 February 2015, he was selected as the official Liberal candidate on the second ballot at a riding nomination meeting. On the 19th of October, he was elected with 46.6% of the vote, defeating sitting New Democratic Party MP Jamie Nicholls.

In December 2015 he was appointed Parliamentary Secretary to the Prime Minister for Youth. As Parliamentary Secretary for Youth, he worked closely with Prime Minister Trudeau in the creation of the first-ever Prime Minister’s Youth Council, the creation of the first-ever Youth Policy for the Government of Canada, and advocated for increases to student aid, bursaries, and entrepreneurship programs. In August 2018, he was asked to take on additional responsibilities and serve as the Parliamentary Secretary to the Minister of Border Security and Organized Crime Reduction, Bill Blair. In this role, he helped lead the implementation of the Cannabis Act, which legalized recreational use of cannabis in Canada on 17 October 2018, and helped lead Canada’s response to the record numbers of asylum seekers and irregular migrants entering Canada through irregular and regular points of entry.

He ran again in the 2019 election and was re-elected with 47.3% of the vote. Prime Minister Justin Trudeau subsequently appointed him the Parliamentary Secretary for Environment and Climate Change in December 2019. During his time as Parliamentary Secretary, he was asked to take on a leadership role in the Government efforts to protect 25% of Canada’s Nature by 2025, update and strengthen Canada’s Environmental Protection Act (CEPA) that had not been updated since 1999, and implement a ban on harmful single-use plastics. The ban on harmful single-use plastics was announced by Prime Minister Justin Trudeau on the 7th of October 2020, and came into force in 2022. Updated CEPA legislation, Bill C-28: Strengthening Environmental Protection for a Healthier Canada Act, was tabled in the House of Commons on the 13th of April, 2021, but ultimately died on the order paper when the election was called on the 15th of August of that same year. CEPA legislation was re-introduced in the 44th Parliament, and was subsequently adopted. In March 2021, Prime Minister Trudeau appointed him the Parliamentary Secretary to the Minister of Immigration, Refugees, and Citizenship and he served in that capacity until the Federal election was called on 15 August of the same year.

On September 20, 2021, he was elected for a third term as the Member of Parliament for Vaudreuil-Soulanges, receiving 46.4% of the vote. On 16 December 2021, he was elected the Chair of the House of Commons Standing Committee on Transport, Infrastructure, and Communities.

On April 28, 2025, Peter was elected for a fourth consecutive term, receiving 57.8% of the vote. Shortly after, he took his seat in the House of Commons to serve the citizens of the newly named riding of “Vaudreuil” in the 45th Parliament. He continues to serve as the Chaiman of the House of Commons Standing Committee on Transport, Infrastructure, and Communities.

== Awards ==
- 2003 | Minister of Veterans Affairs Commendation: Awarded in recognition of his outstanding service to Canadian Veterans through education and awareness initiatives.
- 2008 | Forces Avenir Award for Peace Justice & Humanitarian Aid: Awarded for the founding of the Concordia Volunteer Abroad Program and its strong and positive impact in the lives of people in developing nations.
- 2010 | YMCA Peace Prize Recipient: Best international humanitarian project-Concordia Volunteer Abroad Program.
- 2024 | Bestowed the title of Commander of the Royal Order of Civil Merit by his Majesty, King Felipe VI of Spain. Awarded in recognition of his unparalleled in Parliament to strengthen economic, social and political relations between Canada and the Kingdom of Spain.

== Electoral record ==
2025 Canadian federal election: Vaudreuil
Party	Candidate	Votes	%	±%	Expenditures
Liberal	Peter Schiefke	40,982	57.87	+10.40	$112,901.21
Conservative	Thomas Barré	16,179	22.85	+6.37	$3,651.27
Bloc Québécois	Christopher Massé	10,571	14.93	–6.03	$7,851.33
New Democratic	Kalden Dhatsenpa	1,602	2.26	–8.37	$0.00
Green	Dave Hamelin-Schuilenburg	957	1.35	–1.18	$1,744.20
People's	Jean Boily	527	0.74	N/A	$328.60
Total valid votes/expense limit		70,818	99.09	+0.93	$140,823.58
Total rejected ballots		652	0.91	–0.93	
Turnout		71,470	74.86	+8.16	
Eligible voters		95,475			
Liberal notional hold		Swing		+2.02	
Source: Elections Canada

2021 Canadian federal election: Vaudreuil—Soulanges
Party	Candidate	Votes	%	±%	Expenditures
Liberal	Peter Schiefke	30,001	46.5	-0.8	$86,137.80
Bloc Québécois	Thierry Vadnais-Lapierre	14,308	22.2	-2.2	$2,242.01
Conservative	Karen Cox	10,556	16.3	+4.8	$10,931.31
New Democratic	Niklas Brake	6,780	10.5	-0.3	$403.80
Green	Cameron Stiff	1,631	2.5	-2.5	$1,085.30
Free	Ginette Destrempes	1,288	2.0	N/A	$399.41
Total valid votes/expense limit		64,564	98.1	–	$125,354.78
Total rejected ballots		1,233	1.9		
Turnout		65,797	66.9		
Eligible voters		98,289			
Liberal hold		Swing		+0.7	
Source: Elections Canada

2019 Canadian federal election: Vaudreuil—Soulanges
Party	Candidate	Votes	%	±%	Expenditures
Liberal	Peter Schiefke	32,254	47.3	+0.68	$108,254.46
Bloc Québécois	Noémie Rouillard	16,600	24.4	+9.36	none listed
Conservative	Karen Cox	7,804	11.5	-2.31	none listed
New Democratic	Amanda MacDonald	7,368	10.8	-11.51	none listed
Green	Cameron Stiff	3,405	5.0	+2.79	none listed
People's	Kaylin Tam	711	1.0		none listed
Total valid votes/expense limit		68,142	100.0		
Total rejected ballots		962			
Turnout		69,104	72.4		
Eligible voters		95,435			
Liberal hold		Swing		-4.34	
Source: Elections Canada

2015 Canadian federal election: Vaudreuil—Soulanges
Party	Candidate	Votes	%	±%	Expenditures
Liberal	Peter Schiefke	30,550	46.62	+34.23	–
New Democratic	Jamie Nicholls (Note: Nicholls is now known as Jae due to gender transition.)	14,627	22.31	-21.19	–
Bloc Québécois	Vincent François	9,858	15.04	-8.62	–
Conservative	Marc Boudreau	9,048	13.81	-3.8	–
Green	Jennifer Kaszel	1,445	2.21	-0.63	–
Total valid votes/expense limit		65,528	100.0		$231,083.77
Total rejected ballots		714	–	–	
Turnout		66,242	–	–	
Eligible voters		89,766			
Source: Elections Canada
