= Marcel Bourbonnais =

Canadian politician

Member of the Canadian Parliament for Vaudreuil—Soulanges
- In office 1958–1963
- Preceded by: Louis-René Beaudoin
- Succeeded by: René Émard

Personal details
- Born: 27 February 1918 Quebec City, Quebec, Canada
- Died: 14 October 1996 (aged 78)
- Party: Progressive Conservative Party
- Occupation: Draftsman engineer foreman technician

J.-Marcel Bourbonnais (27 February 1918 – 14 October 1996) was a Canadian politician, draftsman, engineer, foreman and technician. He was elected to the House of Commons of Canada in 1958 as a Member of the Progressive Conservative Party to represent the riding of Vaudreuil—Soulanges. He was re-elected in 1962 and defeated in the elections of 1957, 1963 and 1965.

1965 Canadian federal election: Vaudreuil—Soulanges
Party	Candidate	Votes	%	±%
Liberal	René Émard	8,955	50.79	+1.04
Progressive Conservative	Marcel Bourbonnais	6,580	37.32	+2.59
New Democratic	Roger Carrier	1,346	7.63	
Ralliement créditiste	Jean-Marie Veilleux	750	4.25	-9.22
Total valid votes		17,631	100.00	

Note: Ralliement créditiste vote is compared to Social Credit vote in the 1963 election.

1958 Canadian federal election: Vaudreuil—Soulanges
Party	Candidate	Votes	%	±%
Progressive Conservative	Marcel Bourbonnais	8,161	52.87	+21.36
Liberal	Armand Asselin	7,274	47.13	-21.36
Total valid votes		15,435	100.00	

1957 Canadian federal election: Vaudreuil—Soulanges
Party	Candidate	Votes	%	±%
Liberal	Louis-René Beaudoin	9,055	68.49	-10.48
Progressive Conservative	Marcel Bourbonnais	4,166	31.51	+10.48
Total valid votes		13,221	100.00	
