= Pierre Cadieux =

Canadian politician and lawyer

The Honourable Pierre Cadieux PC

Deputy Leader of the Government in the House of Commons
- In office April 21, 1991 – June 24, 1993
- Prime Minister: Brian Mulroney
- Leader: Harvie Andre
- Preceded by: Marcel Danis
- Succeeded by: Alfonso Gagliano

Minister of State (Fitness and Amateur Sport)
- In office April 21, 1991 – June 24, 1993
- Prime Minister: Brian Mulroney
- Preceded by: Marcel Danis
- Succeeded by: Mary Collins (as minister of Amateur Sport)

Solicitor General of Canada
- In office February 23, 1990 – April 20, 1991
- Prime Minister: Brian Mulroney
- Preceded by: Pierre Blais
- Succeeded by: Doug Lewis

Minister of Indian Affairs and Northern Development
- In office January 30, 1989 – February 22, 1990
- Prime Minister: Brian Mulroney
- Preceded by: Bill McKnight
- Succeeded by: Tom Siddon

Minister of Labour
- In office June 30, 1986 – January 30, 1989
- Prime Minister: Brian Mulroney
- Preceded by: Bill McKnight
- Succeeded by: Jean Corbeil

Member of Parliament for Vaudreuil
- In office November 5, 1984 – September 8, 1993
- Preceded by: Hal Herbert
- Succeeded by: Nick Discepola

Personal details
- Born: Pierre H. Cadieux; April 6, 1948 (age 77) Hudson, Quebec, Canada
- Party: Progressive Conservative
- Occupation: Politician; Lawyer

Pierre H. Cadieux PC (born April 6, 1948) is a lawyer and former Canadian politician.

Born in Hudson, Quebec, Cadieux was first elected to the House of Commons of Canada as the Progressive Conservative Member of Parliament for Vaudreuil, Quebec in the 1984 federal election that brought Brian Mulroney to power.

In 1986, he was appointed to the Canadian Cabinet as minister of Labour, and in 1989, was moved in a cabinet shuffle to minister of Indian Affairs and Northern Development. In that position, future Prime Minister Kim Campbell served under him as minister of state. In 1990, he was shuffled again to the position of Solicitor-General of Canada, and in 1991, he became Deputy Government House Leader and minister of State for Fitness and Amateur Sport and for Youth.

Cadieux left Cabinet when Mulroney retired as prime minister, and did not run in the 1993 federal election.

1988 Canadian federal election: Vaudreuil
Party	Candidate	Votes
Progressive Conservative	Pierre Cadieux	30,392
Liberal	Jean Blais	16,393
New Democratic	Suzanne Aubertin	6,185
Green	Yves-Marie Christin	912
Rhinoceros	Maureen Decelles	671
Commonwealth of Canada	Isajlovic Momcilo	43

Parliament of Canada
Preceded by Hal Herbert	Member of Parliament for Vaudreuil; 1984–1993	Succeeded by Nick Discepola
Political offices
Preceded by William Hunter McKnight	Minister of Indian Affairs and Northern Development; January 30, 1989 – February 22, 1990	Succeeded by Thomas Edward Siddon
Preceded by Pierre Blais	Solicitor General of Canada; February 23, 1990 – April 20, 1991	Succeeded by Douglas Grinslade Lewis
Preceded by Marcel Danis	Deputy Leader of the Government in the House of Commons; April 21, 1991 – June 24, 1993	Succeeded by Alfonso Gagliano
Preceded by Marcel Danis	Progressive Conservative Party Deputy House Leader; April 21, 1991 – June 24, 1993	Succeeded by Bill Matthews
