= Louis-René Beaudoin =

Canadian politician (1912–1970)

The Honourable Louis-René Beaudoin PC

23rd Speaker of the House of Commons of Canada
- In office November 12, 1953 – October 13, 1957
- Preceded by: William Ross Macdonald
- Succeeded by: Roland Michener

Member of Parliament for Vaudreuil—Soulanges
- In office June 11, 1945 – March 30, 1958
- Preceded by: Joseph Thauvette
- Succeeded by: Marcel Bourbonnais

Personal details
- Born: May 5, 1912 Montreal, Quebec, Canada
- Died: February 21, 1970 (aged 57) Montreal, Quebec, Canada
- Party: Liberal
- Spouses: Margaret Louise Wespiser (m. 1937; div. 1958); Alice Margaret Outram (m. 1958; div. 1964)
- Profession: Barrister

Louis-René Beaudoin PC (May 5, 1912 – February 21, 1970) was Speaker of the House of Commons of Canada from 1953 to 1957.

Though trained as a lawyer, Beaudoin came from a working class background and financed his education by working as a bus driver and labourer. He became a legal advisor to the Quebec Federation of Labour and volunteered for the Quebec Liberal Party prior to winning election to Parliament. He founded a law firm in Montreal with Maurice Riel during the 1950s under the name Beaudoin, Riel, Geoffrion & Vermette now known as Dunton Rainville.

Beadouin was first elected to the House of Commons of Canada in the 1945 election as a Liberal from Quebec. He became Deputy Speaker in 1952 and was appointed Speaker of the House of Commons on November 12, 1953.

Beaudoin's nomination was seconded by Leader of the Opposition George Drew. His reputation as a competent Speaker grew until the Pipeline Debate in 1956 in which the government invoked closure repeatedly in an attempt to force legislation through the house and force a vote with a minimum of debate.

In the course of the debate, Beaudoin initially ruled that debate could occur on an appeal of a ruling by the Deputy Speaker. The next day, Beaudoin reversed his ruling and moved that the vote on the appeal proceed without debate. The Opposition was outraged and a number of Members of Parliament (MPs) stormed the Chair, calling the Speaker a "traitor" and "coward".

The following Monday, George Drew introduced a motion of censure against Beaudoin whom he accused of destroying the Speakership. The Liberal majority defeated the motion, but less than a month later, Mr. Drew called attention to a newspaper in which there was a letter by Beaudoin criticizing the behaviour of opposition members during the pipeline debate. Beaudoin argued it was a private letter, not intended to be published. The following day, however, he placed his resignation before the House. Prime Minister Louis St. Laurent was out of the country, but on returning, he persuaded Mr. Beaudoin to stay on until the end of the Parliament.

Beaudoin's reputation was destroyed. While he was re-elected to the House in the 1957 election, he had lost interest in political life and did not contest the 1958 election.

After obtaining a Reno, Nevada divorce from his wife of 21 years, he married Alice Margaret Outram, 24 years his junior, and moved to the United States. Briefly enrolled in a doctoral program at Columbia University, he left without finishing his thesis and spent the remainder of his life drifting from job to job, eventually finding work as a bartender at Freddy's Tavern in Tempe, Arizona. In 1964 his second marriage failed and the following year he returned to Canada. For part of 1965 he taught high school French at Morin Heights High School in the Quebec Laurentians. He attempted to re-enter politics for the 1968 federal election, but failed to secure the Liberal nomination.

In February 1970 he died aged 57 of a heart attack.

1953 Canadian federal election: Vaudreuil—Soulanges
Party	Candidate	Votes	%	±%
Liberal	Louis-René Beaudoin	8,463	78.97	+11.40
Progressive Conservative	Roger-Paul Sullivan	2,254	21.03	-11.40
Total valid votes		10,717	100.00	

1949 Canadian federal election: Vaudreuil—Soulanges
Party	Candidate	Votes	%	±%
Liberal	Louis-René Beaudoin	7,622	67.56	+4.62
Progressive Conservative	J.-Omer Lalonde	3,659	32.44	
Total valid votes		11,281	100.00	

1945 Canadian federal election: Vaudreuil—Soulanges
Party	Candidate	Votes	%	±%
Liberal	Louis-René Beaudoin	6,267	62.94	+14.75
Independent	Jean Lamarche	1,880	18.88	
Bloc populaire	Robert Stocker	1,619	16.26	
Co-operative Commonwealth	J.-Albert Bourbonnais	191	1.92	
Total valid votes		9,957	100.00	

== Archives ==
There is a Louis-René Beaudoin fonds at Library and Archives Canada. Archival reference number is R3298.
