= Meili Faille =

Canadian politician

Meili Faille MP

Member of Parliament for Vaudreuil-Soulanges
- In office June 28, 2004 – May 2, 2011
- Preceded by: Nick Discepola
- Succeeded by: Jamie Nicholls

Personal details
- Born: June 18, 1972 (age 54) Montreal, Quebec, Canada
- Party: Bloc Québécois
- Profession: project coordinator

Meili Faille (born June 18, 1972) is a Canadian politician. She was a Bloc Québécois member of the House of Commons of Canada, being first elected in the 2004 election in the district of Vaudreuil-Soulanges. Prior to being elected, Faille was a consultant and project coordinator. From 2004 to 2008 she was the Bloc shadow critic of Citizenship and Immigration.

During the 38th Parliament, Meili Faille was Vice-Chair of Standing Committee on Citizenship and Immigration (CIMM) from October 14, 2004 through October 7, 2005.

Faille, a Canadian of Taiwanese descent, was born in Montreal, Quebec. Prior to being elected, Faille was Project Leader and Primary Consultant for Groupe LGS (1996–2004). Faille has worked as intern for the Secretary General of the Canadian Human Rights Commission (1993), was Ministerial editor for special projects and briefing notes for the Minister of Employment and Immigration (1992–1993, was an intern in the Cabinet for the Minister of Physical Education and Amateur Sports (1991–1992), was an intern in the Cabinet for the Solicitor General of Canada (1990–1991) and was an intern in the cabinet of the Minister of Northern Canadian and Indian Affairs (1989).

Faille holds a Bachelor's in Business Administration from the Université du Québec en Outaouais in Hull, Quebec, and studied Applied Sciences and Chemical Engineering at the University of Ottawa.

Faille studied classical (7 years) and contemporary (2 years) piano and followed an apprenticeship for two years under renowned artist Marcel Bourbonnais.

2011 Canadian federal election: Vaudreuil—Soulanges
Party	Candidate	Votes	%	±%	Expenditures
New Democratic	Jamie Nicholls (Note: Nicholls is now known as Jae due to gender transition.)	30,177	43.61	+33.98	
Bloc Québécois	Meili Faille	17,781	25.69	-15.65	
Conservative	Marc Boudreau	11,360	16.41	-7.28	
Liberal	Lyne Pelchat	8,023	11.59	-9.74	
Green	Jean-Yves Massenet	1,864	2.69	-1.32	
Total valid votes/expense limit		69,205	100.00		
Total rejected ballots		763	1.09		
Turnout		69,968	67.23		

2008 Canadian federal election: Vaudreuil—Soulanges
Party	Candidate	Votes	%	±%	Expenditures
Bloc Québécois	Meili Faille	27,044	41.34	-1.82	$80,072
Conservative	Michael Fortier	15,496	23.69	+4.69	$87,967
Liberal	Brigitte Legault	13,954	21.33	-6.96	$32,958
New Democratic	Maxime Héroux-Legault	6,298	9.63	+4.09	$1,519
Green	Jean-Yves Massenet	2,625	4.01	+0.10	$1,913
Total valid votes/expense limit		65,417	100.00	$96,487	
Total rejected ballots		729	1.10		
Turnout		66,146	67.76		

2006 Canadian federal election: Vaudreuil—Soulanges
Party	Candidate	Votes	%	±%	Expenditures
Bloc Québécois	Meili Faille	27,012	43.16	-1.13	$85,133
Liberal	Marc Garneau	17,768	28.39	-10.41	$79,413
Conservative	Stephane Bourgon	11,889	19.00	+10.81	$35,090
New Democratic	Bert Markgraf	3,468	5.54	+1.64	$3,385
Green	Pierre Pariseau-Legault	2,450	3.91	+0.14	$1,144
Total valid votes/expense limit		62,587	100.00	$85,543	

2004 Canadian federal election: Vaudreuil—Soulanges
Party	Candidate	Votes	%	±%	Expenditures
Bloc Québécois	Meili Faille	24,675	44.29	+4.31	$67,962
Liberal	Nick Discepola	21,613	38.80	-12.77	$57,607
Conservative	Robert Ramage	4,558	8.18	-3.99	$25,438
New Democratic	Bert Markgraf	2,175	3.90	+2.13	$2,698
Green	Julie C. Baribeau	2,103	3.77	–	$1,206
Marijuana	Charles Soucy	585	1.05	–	
Total valid votes/expense limit		55,709	100.00	$81,759	

Note: Conservative vote is compared to the total of the Canadian Alliance vote and Progressive Conservative vote in 2000 election.
