= Joseph-Rodolphe Ouimet =

Canadian politician

Member of Parliament for Vaudreuil—Soulanges
- In office March 1922 – September 1925
- Preceded by: Gustave Benjamin Boyer
- Succeeded by: Lawrence Alexander Wilson

Personal details
- Born: 16 November 1878 L'Île-Bizard, Quebec
- Died: 21 August 1948 (aged 69) Saint-Polycarpe, Quebec
- Party: Liberal
- Spouse: Hortense Mousseau
- Profession: notary

Joseph-Rodolphe Ouimet (16 November 1878 – 21 August 1948) was a Liberal party member of the House of Commons of Canada. He was born in L'Île-Bizard, Quebec and became a notary.

The son of Adolphe Ouimet and Clephire Nantel, he was educated at the Collège Sainte-Marie de Montréal and entered practice as a notary in Saint-Polycarpe. In 1905, Ouimet married Hortense Mousseau, the sister of Joseph-Octave Mousseau.

He was elected to Parliament at the Vaudreuil—Soulanges riding in a by-election on 21 March 1922. After serving for the remainder of the 14th Canadian Parliament, Ouimet left federal politics and did not seek another term in the 1925 election.
