= Jean-Baptiste Mongenais =

Canadian politician

Jean-Baptiste Mongenais (November 24, 1803 – May 28, 1887) was a Quebec businessman and political figure. He was a Conservative member representing Vaudreuil in the House of Commons of Canada from 1879 to 1882.

He was born in Rigaud, Lower Canada in 1823 and grew up there. He became a farmer and merchant and was also a shareholder and administrator for the Vaudreuil Railway Company. Mongenais helped found the Collège Bourget at Rigaud. In 1848, he was elected to the Legislative Assembly for Vaudreuil; he was reelected in 1851, 1854 and 1861. Mongenais was a justice of the peace and served in the local militia, becoming lieutenant-colonel in 1869. He retired from business in 1857. After Confederation, he was first elected to the House of Commons at the age of 76. He died at Rigaud in 1887.

His son-in-law, Hugh McMillan, also represented Vaudreuil in the House of Commons.

1878 Canadian federal election: Vaudreuil
Party	Candidate	Votes
Conservative	Jean-Baptiste Mongenais	764
Liberal–Conservative	Robert Harwood	702

Parliament of Canada
Preceded by Robert Harwood	Member of Parliament for Vaudreuil; 1878–1882	Succeeded by Hugh McMillan
