= Charles Sauvageau =

Canadian composer and conductor

Michel-Charles Sauvageau (October or November 1807 – 16 June 1849) was a Canadian conductor, composer, and music educator. He is believed to be the first native of what is now Quebec to devote his entire life to music. An August 1844 article in the periodical Le Ménestrel described him as the "first national musician [of Canada]".

== Life ==
Born in Quebec City, Sauvageau was a largely self-taught musician, although he most likely received some instruction from Jean-Chrysostome Brauneis I for whose band he played in 1831–1832. In 1833 he founded his own quadrille band, which he conducted until his death 16 years later. He also conducted several other enemies, including the Quebec Militia Artillery Band (1833–1836), the band of the Petit Séminaire (1841–1844), Musique Canadienne (beginning in 1842), the band for the St Jean-Baptiste Society (from 1842), and the Quebec Philharmonic Union (1848–49). His music was published in the Canadian literary magazine Literary Garland.

Sauvageau was also active as an organizer of concerts and informal evenings of musical entertainment within his native city. Many of these events featured performances by his private students, such as Joseph Lyonnais and Napoléon Aubin; the latter of whom became his brother-in-law. His son Flavien (born 1831) was a violin prodigy, but he died at the age of 15 on 12 June 1846 in the fire that destroyed the St-Louis theatre.

Towards the end of his life, Sauvageau ran a music store. He died in Quebec City at the age of 41.
