= Jae Nicholls =

Canadian politician (born 1971)

Mayor of Hudson, Quebec
- In office November, 2017 – November, 2021
- Preceded by: Ed Prévost
- Succeeded by: Chloe Hutchison

Member of the Canadian Parliament for Vaudreuil-Soulanges
- In office May 2, 2011 – October 19, 2015
- Preceded by: Meili Faille
- Succeeded by: Peter Schiefke

Personal details
- Born: October 15, 1971 (age 54) Montreal, Quebec, Canada
- Party: New Democratic Party
- Profession: Landscape architect

Jae Nicholls (aka Jamie Nicholls; born October 15, 1971) is a Canadian social democrat and politician. They were a New Democratic Party Member of Parliament from 2011 to 2015 and was later the mayor of Hudson, Quebec.

Born in Montreal and raised in Hudson, Nicholls attended both St-Thomas elementary and Hudson High School. They became a New Democrat while enrolled at Malaspina College (now Vancouver Island University) in Nanaimo, BC at the age of 18. They graduated from the University of Victoria with a Bachelor of Fine Arts in Visual Arts in 1995. During that period, they were an outspoken social and environmental activist in Victoria, BC.

Upon graduating, Nicholls lived and taught in South Korea and Turkey. They were a lecturer in Visual Communication Design in the Faculty of Communications at Istanbul's Bahcesehir University until 2003. They returned to Canada to pursue a graduate degree in landscape architecture from the School of Architecture and Landscape Architecture at the University of British Columbia. Graduating in 2007, they returned to Quebec to work as a landscape architect.

Nicholls is a former Member of Parliament in Canada's 41st parliament. They were elected to represent Vaudreuil-Soulanges in the House of Commons of Canada in the 2011 election. On June 20, 2011 Jack Layton appointed them to serve as the Vice-Chair for standing committee on Transport, Infrastructure and Communities for the official opposition. In 2015, she was appointed Vice-Chair for the standing committee on Official Languages. She was defeated in the 2015 Red Tide election by Liberal Peter Schiefke.

In November 2017, Nicholls was elected mayor of Hudson, Quebec. She lost in the 2021 municipal election.

They live in Rigaud with their wife Amanda MacDonald and their five children. Nicholls is transgender and started publicly identifying as gender fluid/non-binary after leaving politics.

== Life and career ==
After studying and working in Vancouver, South Korea, and Turkey, they returned to Quebec permanently in 2007. Before their election to Parliament, Nicholls worked in a variety of fields: arts and design teacher, environmental researcher, ecological intervention adviser, registered landscape architect (AAPQ) and was a board member of COBAVER (Conseil des bassins versants Vaudreuil-Soulanges).

To win their seat in the House of Commons, Nicholls defeated incumbent Bloc Québécois MP Meili Faille. They were friends in high school.

Working as a landscape architect while they were enrolled at McGill University's School of Urban Planning, Nicholls was one of five current McGill students, alongside undergraduates Mylène Freeman, Matthew Dubé, Charmaine Borg and Laurin Liu, elected to Parliament in the 2011 election following the NDP's unexpected mid-campaign surge in Quebec.

Following their defeat in the 2015 election, Nicholls ran for mayor of Hudson in Quebec's 2017 municipal elections, and won the election.

== Electoral history ==
2017 Quebec municipal elections: Hudson
Mayoral candidate	Vote	%
Jae Nicholls	1,788	73.64
William Nash	507	20.88
Joseph H. Eletr	133	5.48
Total	2428	100.00
Source: Ministry of Municipal Affairs and Housing (Quebec)

2015 Canadian federal election: Vaudreuil—Soulanges
Party	Candidate	Votes	%	±%	Expenditures
Liberal	Peter Schiefke	30,550	46.62	+34.23	–
New Democratic	Jae Nicholls	14,627	22.31	-21.19	–
Bloc Québécois	Vincent François	9,858	15.04	-8.62	–
Conservative	Marc Boudreau	9,048	13.81	-3.8	–
Green	Jennifer Kaszel	1,445	2.21	-0.63	–
Total valid votes/Expense limit		65,528	100.0		$231,083.77
Total rejected ballots		714	–	–	
Turnout		66,242	–	–	
Eligible voters		89,766			
Source: Elections Canada

2011 Canadian federal election: Vaudreuil—Soulanges
Party	Candidate	Votes	%	±%	Expenditures
New Democratic	Jamie Nicholls (Note: Nicholls is now known as Jae due to gender transition.)	30,177	43.61	+33.98	
Bloc Québécois	Meili Faille	17,781	25.69	-15.65	
Conservative	Marc Boudreau	11,360	16.41	-7.28	
Liberal	Lyne Pelchat	8,023	11.59	-9.74	
Green	Jean-Yves Massenet	1,864	2.69	-1.32	
Total valid votes/expense limit		69,205	100.00		
Total rejected ballots		763	1.09		
Turnout		69,968	67.23		
