= Jean-Chrysostome Brauneis II =

Canadian music educator, organist, composer (1814–1871)

Jean- or John-Chrysostome Brauneis II, (26 January 1814 – 11 August 1871) was a Canadian composer, organist, and music educator. A multifaceted musician, Brauneis instructed students in many musical subjects, including composition, conducting, guitar, harp, organ, piano, violin, voice, and theory. Considered Canada's first native musician to be trained in Europe, he was a highly influential teacher and figure in the classical music scene in 19th century Montreal. His most well known composition, The Royal Welcome Waltzes (1869), is still performed in concert and was recorded on disc by Symphony Nova Scotia in 1987.

== Life and career ==
Born in Quebec City, Brauneis was the son of composer and bandmaster Jean-Chrysostome Brauneis I. He began his studies with his father, but went on to become the first native born Canadian to study music in Europe, where he resided from 1830 until 1833. After returning to Canada, he served as organist at Notre-Dame Church from 1833 until 1844, and then in the same position at Saint-Jacques Cathedral until 1857 when he was succeeded by Romain-Octave Pelletier I. In 1837 he founded the short lived 'Société de Musique', Montreal's first music society.

For more than 30 years, Brauneis taught music at the Congregation of Notre Dame of Montreal in addition to teaching privately and at other schools. He began his teaching career teaching piano and organ, introducing his students to the great classical composers and the piano studies of Muzio Clementi, Johann Baptist Cramer, and Carl Czerny. In 1842 he began teaching singing, offering vocal lessons in the tradition of the German school of singing. He also taught lessons in guitar, harp, and violin performance in addition to giving instruction in music theory and composition. He also led a band in Montreal and worked as a piano tuner and seller of imported instruments.

As a composer, Brauneis wrote mainly symphonic works, dances, and pieces for the piano and organ. His 1835 Mass with orchestral accompaniment was positively received with a complimentary review in La Minerve on 12 July 1835. In 1848 the publishing company Lovell & Gibson published his "Marche de la St. Jean Baptiste" and his "The Montreal Bazaar Polka". In 1849 his "The Monklands Polka" was published by both Dubois Publishers and by Mead Brothers Publishers. In 1869 he self-published his most enduring work, The Royal Welcome Waltzes; a series of waltzes named after Canadian cities which are dedicated to Prince Arthur, Duke of Connaught and Strathearn. Three of these waltzes were later published by the Canadian Musical Heritage Society in their first volume of Canadian music.

Brauneis died in Montreal in 1871 at the age of 57. His daughter, Marie-Josephine Sydney, was married to politician Henry Stanislas Harwood, and his grandson was the well known Canadian gynecologist Louis de Lotbiniere-Harwood.
