= Henry Stanislas Harwood =

Canadian politician

The Honourable Henry Stanislas Harwood
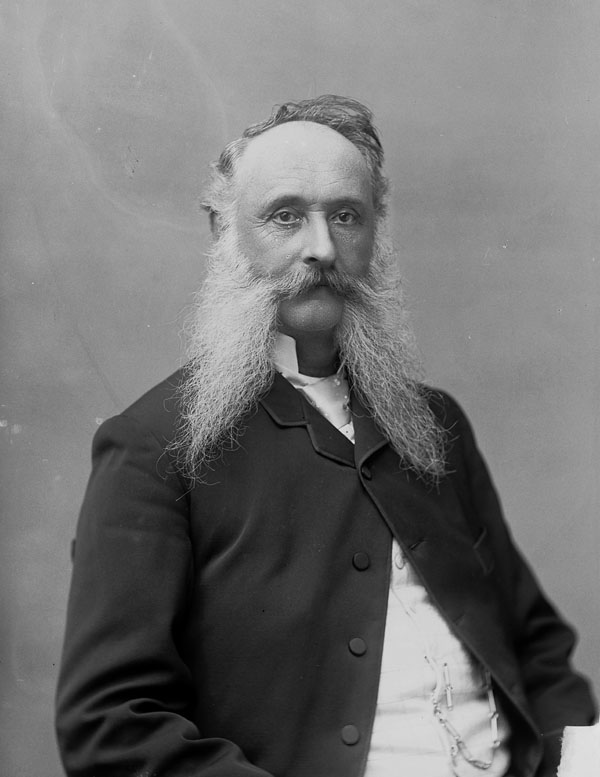

Member of the House of Commons of Canada for Vaudreuil
- In office 1891–1892

Member of the House of Commons of Canada for Vaudreuil
- In office 1893–1904

Personal details
- Born: 8 August 1838 Vaudreuil, Lower Canada
- Died: 28 August 1911 (aged 73) Montreal. Quebec
- Occupation: Seigneur & Politician

Henry Stanislas de Lotbiniere Harwood (August 8, 1838 – August 28, 1911) was a landowner and political figure in Quebec. He represented Vaudreuil in the House of Commons of Canada as a Liberal member from 1891 to 1892 and 1893 to 1904.

Born at the Manor of Vaudreuil, Quebec, the sixth child and fourth son of Robert Unwin Harwood and Marie-Louise-Josephte Chartier de Lotbiniere (1803–1869), Seigneuress of Vaudreuil, the eldest daughter of Michel-Eustache-Gaspard-Alain Chartier de Lotbiniere, de jure 2nd Marquis de Lotbiniere. His brother, Robert William Harwood, had also represented Vaudreuil in the House of Commons and another brother, Antoine Chartier de Lotbiniere Harwood represented Vaudreuil in the Quebec Assembly. He was a nephew of Pierre-Gustave Joly de Lotbinière and a first cousin of Sir Henri-Gustave Joly de Lotbiniere, Prime Minister of Quebec. His brother-in-law, Sir Henri-Elzear Taschereau, was Chief Justice of Canada.

He was educated at the Collège Sainte-Marie de Montréal, and afterwards at the Université Laval, Quebec City. He was the co-seigneur of Vaudreuil and became the Provincial land surveyor, later serving as the Mayor of Vaudreuil. His Parliamentary election in 1892 was declared invalid and Hugh McMillan was elected in the by-election that followed; after an appeal, another by-election was held and Harwood was elected by acclamation. In 1864, he married Marie-Josephine Sydney (1840-1912), daughter of Jean-Chrysostome Brauneis II (1814–1871), organist, composer and teacher - the first Canadian to study music in Europe (1830–33). They were the parents of Louis de Lotbiniere-Harwood and Josephine, the wife of William Rafael Kappelle de Kappelle, Count de Kappelle, of Belgium.

== Electoral record ==
1896 Canadian federal election: Vaudreuil
Party	Candidate	Votes
Liberal	Henry Stanislas Harwood	1,296
Conservative	Aldéric Séguin	801

1900 Canadian federal election: Vaudreuil
Party	Candidate	Votes
Liberal	Henry Stanislas Harwood	1,140
Conservative	Alfred Lapointe	665
