= Robert Harwood (politician) =

Canadian politician

Robert William de Lotbinière-Harwood (October 27, 1826 – June 29, 1897) was a landowner and political figure in Lower Canada and Quebec. He represented Vaudreuil in the House of Commons of Canada as a Liberal-Conservative member from 1872 to 1878.

== Career ==
Harwood was born in Montreal, Lower Canada, the son of Robert Unwin Harwood and Marie-Louise-Josephte de Lotbiniere, daughter of Michel-Eustache-Gaspard-Alain Chartier de Lotbinière. He was a brother of Antoine Chartier de Lotbinière Harwood and Henry Stanislas Harwood, and a first cousin of Sir Henri-Gustave Joly de Lotbinière, who served as the Prime Minister of Quebec and Lieutenant Governor of British Columbia. He was educated at the Collège Saint-Sulpice in Montreal, and became a Captain in the Vaudreuil Militia, also serving as a warden for the County of Vaudreuil. Harwood ran unsuccessfully for a seat in the Quebec assembly in 1871. He was defeated in a bid for re-election to the federal seat in 1878 by Jean-Baptiste Mongenais.

He lived at, and shared ownership of, the old Seigneury of Vaudreuil with his siblings and lived there with his wife, Mary Charlotte McGillis (1836–1918). They were married in 1856. She was the daughter of John McGillis (1805–1897), a lawyer of St. Johns, Quebec, by his wife Elizabeth (1820–1893), daughter of William Caldwell of Caldwell. John McGillis was the heir to his uncle Hugh McGillis (1767–1848), one of the partners in the North West Company, who bought the house of Sir John Johnson, 2nd Baronet in Williamstown, Ontario, which John McGillis inherited and where the future Mrs Harwood was brought up. Harwood's sister, Marie-Louise, also married into the McGillis family. Her husband, Antoine Eustache de Bellefeuille MacDonald was a son of Emily McGillis, Mrs Harwood's aunt. MacDonald was a brother-in-law of William McGillivray, nephew of Simon McTavish and Sir Archibald Campbell, 1st Baronet.

Harwood died at his home in Vaudreuil, Quebec at the age of 70. His son, Charles-Auguste de Lotbiniere-Harwood (1869–1954) of Vaudreuil, married Marie-Adelaide Masson, granddaughter of Joseph Masson of Manoir Terrebonne, Quebec. His daughter, Marie-Elizabeth de Lotbiniere-Harwood (1859–1951), married Major-General Sir Sam Steele of Lord Strathcona's Horse.

1872 Canadian federal election: Vaudreuil
| Party | Candidate | Votes |
|---|---|---|
| Liberal–Conservative | Robert Harwood | 962 |
| Unknown | Godard | 727 |
Source: Canadian Elections Database

1874 Canadian federal election: Vaudreuil
| Party | Candidate | Votes |
|---|---|---|
| Liberal–Conservative | Robert Harwood | acclaimed |
Source: lop.parl.ca

1878 Canadian federal election: Vaudreuil
| Party | Candidate | Votes |
|---|---|---|
| Conservative | Jean-Baptiste Mongenais | 764 |
| Liberal–Conservative | Robert Harwood | 702 |

== Photographs ==
- Robert William Harwood's house at Vaudreuil
