= Seymour de Lotbiniere =

British television executive (1905–1984)

Seymour Joly de Lotbiniere CVO OBE (21 October 1905 – 6 November 1984) known as "Lobby" was a Director of the British Broadcasting Corporation and pioneer of outside broadcasts. He is recognised as developing the technique of sports commentary on radio and subsequently television, and he masterminded the televising of the 1953 Coronation of Queen Elizabeth II. Christopher Martin-Jenkins wrote of him that "he was a towering figure both physically and mentally", the "physically" referring to his height of six feet eight inches (203 cm).

== Early life and education ==
Lotbiniere was the second son of Brigadier-General Henri-Gustave Joly de Lotbinière (1868–1960) D.S.O., and his wife Mildred Louisa, daughter of Charles Seymour Grenfell J.P., of Carshalton. His grandfather, Sir Henri-Gustave Joly de Lotbinière (1829–1908), was Premier of the Canadian province of Quebec, a federal cabinet minister, and Lieutenant-Governor of British Columbia.

He was educated at St Cyprian's School, Eton and Trinity College, Cambridge. He practised as a member of the Chancery Bar before joining the BBC in 1932.

== British Broadcasting Corporation ==
He was the BBC's director of outside broadcasting from 1935 to 1940. After receiving its Royal Charter in 1926, the BBC had been technically innovative in broadcasting sporting events, but its commentators were largely untrained and often unskilled in the art of broadcasting. De Lotbiniere introduced modern methods of commentary, dispensing with the dependence on maps and grids published in the Radio Times to assist the listener. He also realised that ball-by-ball cricket commentary could make compelling radio and in the mid-1930s employed Howard Marshall to begin commentating on cricket, rather than only giving reports. In addition to sporting events, de Lotbiniere was also in charge of the embryonic televising of the 1937 Coronation of King George VI. When television resumed after World War II, de Lotbiniere resumed his post as director of outside broadcasting in 1945, remaining until the mid-1950s. During this period, he oversaw the televising of the 1948 Summer Olympics, and the Coronation of Queen Elizabeth II. The BBC's most ambitious undertaking so far, the Coronation received over seven hours continuous coverage for an audience of more than 20 million people. It was a formative event in the development of television in Britain.

== Personal life ==
In 1968, shortly before his retirement, Lotbiniere bought back Brandon Hall, Suffolk, which had originally been purchased by his father after service with the Canadian Army in World War I and sold after his death in 1960. As a child he had been attracted by Brandon's history. He and his brother had taken torches and ropes to Grimes Graves to explore the pits long before they were opened for public inspection. He became the owner of a private gunflint museum and took a specialist interest in gun flints.

Lotbiniere's only child Henry, born in 1945, was a barrister, who suffered severe facial disfigurement caused by cancer. He defied the disease by carrying on working, and openly showing his pleasure in being alive. He became widely familiar when his portrait was painted by the young Glaswegian artist Mark Gilbert. Seymour de Lotbiniere was the cousin, once removed, of Anthony, or Tony, de Lotbiniere, a documentary film maker for the BBC.

== Publications ==
- "Gunflint recognition", in: International Journal of Nautical Archaeology; 13 (3), 206–209.
- Introduction to S. B. J. Skertchly's The Manufacture of Gunflints (first published by HMSO, 1879) Bloomfield, Ont.: Museum Restoration Service, c1984 ISBN 0-919316-86-7
