= Antoine Chartier de Lotbinière Harwood =

Canadian politician

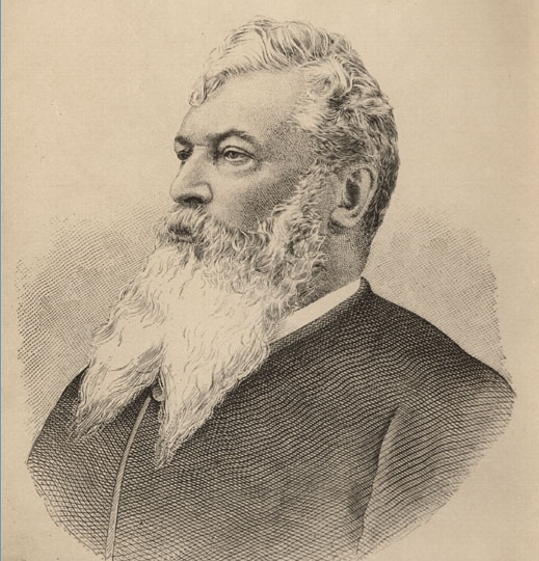

Member of the Legislative Assembly of Quebec for Vaudreuil
- In office 1867–1871
- Succeeded by: Émery Lalonde, Sr.

Personal details
- Born: April 23, 1825 Montreal, Lower Canada
- Died: August 6, 1891 (aged 66) Montreal, Quebec
- Party: Conservative

Antoine Chartier de Lotbinière Harwood (April 23, 1825 – August 6, 1891) was a Quebec lawyer and political figure. He represented Vaudreuil in the Legislative Assembly of Quebec from 1867 to 1871.

He was born in Montreal in 1825, the son of Robert Unwin Harwood and Marie-Louise-Josephte, the daughter of Michel-Eustache-Gaspard-Alain Chartier de Lotbiniere, and studied at the Petit Séminaire de Montréal. He studied law and was admitted to the bar in 1848. He was coseigneur of Vaudreuil, inherited by his mother, Marie-Louise-Josephte Chartier de Lotbinière. He served as secretary for the Vaudreuil Railway Company which his father had helped establish. Harwood also served as captain in the local militia, later becoming lieutenant-colonel.

In 1863, he was elected to the Legislative Assembly of the Province of Canada for Vaudreuil. After Confederation, he represented the same riding in the Quebec legislative assembly.

He died at Montreal in 1891. He was married to Angelique Lefebvre de Bellefeuille, daughter of Eustache Antoine de Bellefeuille, Seigneur of Bellefeuille, Quebec and Adjutant-General of the Quebec Militia, by his wife, Maragaret McGillis, daughter of Duncan McGillis (1754–1838), Senior Partner of the North West Company. They died without children.

His brothers, Henry Stanislas and Robert William, were members of the Canadian House of Commons. He was a first cousin of Sir Henri-Gustave Joly de Lotbinière, Prime Minister of Quebec and Lieutenant Governor of British Columbia.
