= Vaudreuil (federal electoral district) =

Federal electoral district in Quebec, Canada

Coordinates: 45.37°N 74.19°W

Quebec electoral district
- Interactive map of riding boundaries from the 2025 federal election

Federal electoral district
- Legislature: House of Commons
MP
Peter Schiefke
Liberal
- District created: 1867
- First contested: 1867
- Last contested: 2025
- District webpage: profile, map

Demographics
- Population (2011): 111,905
- Electors (2015): 89,766
- Area (km²): 408
- Pop. density (per km²): 274.3
- Census division: Vaudreuil-Soulanges
- Census subdivision(s): Vaudreuil-Dorion, Saint-Lazare, Pincourt, L'Île-Perrot, Notre-Dame-de-l'Île-Perrot, Rigaud, Hudson, Terrasse-Vaudreuil, Vaudreuil-sur-le-Lac, Pointe-Fortune

Vaudreuil (French pronunciation: [vodʁœj]; until 2025 Vaudreuil—Soulanges, [vodʁœj sulɑ̃ʒ]) is a federal electoral district in Quebec, Canada, which has been represented in the House of Commons since 1867.

It consists of the Vaudreuil-Soulanges Regional County Municipality. The neighbouring ridings are Argenteuil—Papineau—Des Collines, Mirabel, Lac-Saint-Louis, Châteauguay—Les Jardins-de-Napierville, Vallée-du-Haut-Saint-Laurent and Prescott—Russell—Cumberland.

Since 2015 its member of Parliament (MP) has been Peter Schiefke of the Liberal Party.

== Profile ==
In recent electoral history, the Liberals have been dominant after taking the riding from the NDP in 2015. Their strength comes particularly from Vaudreuil, Dorion and Ile Perrot. The Bloc has its best showings in the south of the constituency, in Les Cèdres, with pockets in Vaudreuil and Rigaud. The Conservatives have also historically done relatively well, with notable showings in 2006 and 2008 (when they came second to the Bloc).

== Demographics ==
According to the 2021 Canadian census, 2023 representation order

Racial groups: 80.5% White, 4.6% South Asian, 4.2% Black, 2.2% Arab, 1.8% Latin American, 1.7% Filipino, 1.4% Indigenous, 1.3% Chinese
Languages: 53.9% French, 33.9% English, 1.9% Spanish, 1.7% Arabic, 1.6% Punjabi, 1.2% Romanian, 1.1% Russian, 1.0% Italian
Religions: 65.0% Christian (48.4% Catholic, 3.7% Christian Orthodox, 1.8% Anglican, 11.1% Other), 3.7% Muslim, 1.7% Sikh, 1.5% Hindu, 1.1% Jewish, 26.4% None
Median income: $45,600 (2020)
Average income: $56,250 (2020)

== History ==
It was originally created by the British North America Act, 1867 as Vaudreuil. It initially consisted of Isle Perrot, the Seigniories of Vaudreuil and Rigaud, and the first, second, third and fourth ranges of the Township of Newton and augmentation adjacent.

It was merged with Soulanges in 1914 and was renamed Vaudreuil—Soulanges. In keeping with the usual Canadian naming practices, the appellations 'Vaudreuil' and 'Soulanges' were linked by an em-dash as the two counties remained officially separate, and their combination was for electoral purposes only. It was renamed Vaudreuil in 1966, adding a portion of the Island of Montreal and Île Bizard in the process. At the time, it was defined to consist of:

- that part of the City of Pierrefonds situated southwest of the Town of Roxboro;
- the Towns of Baie-D'Urfé, Beaconsfield, Dorion, Île-Cadieux, Île-Perrot, Kirkland, Pincourt, Pointe-du-Moulin, Rigaud, Sainte-Anne-de-Bellevue, Sainte-Geneviève and Vaudreuil;
- the Counties of Soulanges and Vaudreuil;
- the village municipality of Senneville;
- the parish municipality of Saint-Raphaël-de-l'Île-Bizard.

In 1976, it was redefined to consist of:

- the Towns of Baie-D'Urfé, Dorion, Hudson, Île-Cadieux, Île-Perrot, Kirkland, Pincourt, Pointe-du-Moulin, Rigaud, Sainte-Anne-de-Bellevue, Sainte-Geneviève and Vaudreuil;
- the Counties of Soulanges and Vaudreuil;
- the village municipality of Senneville and the parish municipality of Saint-Raphaël-de-l'Île-Bizard;
- that part of the City of Pierrefonds lying southwest of the Town of Dollard-des-Ormeaux.

In 1987, it was redefined to consist of:

- the towns of Baie-D'Urfé, Dorion, Hudson, Île-Cadieux, Île-Perrot, Kirkland, Pincourt, Rigaud, Saint-Anne-de-Bellevue and Vaudreuil;
- in the County of the Île de Montréal: the Village Municipality of Senneville;
- the counties of Vaudreuil and Soulanges.

In 1996, it was redefined to consist of:

- the cities of Dorion, Hudson, L'Île-Cadieux, L'Île-Perrot, Pincourt, Rigaud and Vaudreuil;
- the County Regional Municipality of Vaudreuil-Soulanges.

In 1997, it was renamed Vaudreuil-Soulanges, as it had been realigned to be perfectly co-terminal to the Vaudreuil-Soulanges Regional County Municipality.

This riding lost territory to Salaberry—Suroît during the 2012 electoral redistribution and was renamed "Vaudreuil—Soulanges".

Following the 2022 federal electoral redistribution the riding was renamed back to Vaudreuil. It lost the municipalities of Les Cèdres and Pointe-des-Cascades to Beauharnois—Salaberry—Soulanges—Huntingdon.

=== Members of Parliament ===
This riding has elected the following members of Parliament:

Parliament	Years	Member	Party
Vaudreuil
1st	1867–1872	Donald McMillan	Conservative
2nd	1872–1874	Robert Harwood	Liberal–Conservative
3rd	1874–1878	Robert Harwood	Liberal–Conservative
4th	1878–1882	Jean-Baptiste Mongenais	Conservative
5th	1882–1887	Hugh McMillan	Conservative
6th	1887–1891	Hugh McMillan	Conservative
7th	1891–1892	Henry Stanislas Harwood	Liberal
7th	1892–1893	Hugh McMillan	Conservative
7th	1883–1896	Henry Stanislas Harwood	Liberal
8th	1896–1900	Henry Stanislas Harwood	Liberal
9th	1900–1904	Henry Stanislas Harwood	Liberal
10th	1904–1908	Gustave Benjamin Boyer	Liberal
11th	1908–1911	Gustave Benjamin Boyer	Liberal
12th	1911–1917	Gustave Benjamin Boyer	Liberal
Vaudreuil—Soulanges; Riding created from Vaudreuil and Soulanges
13th	1917–1921	Gustave Benjamin Boyer	Liberal
14th	1921–1922	Gustave Benjamin Boyer	Liberal
14th	1922–1925	Joseph-Rodolphe Ouimet	Liberal
15th	1925–1926	Lawrence Alexander Wilson	Liberal
16th	1926–1930	Lawrence Alexander Wilson	Liberal
17th	1930–1935	Joseph Thauvette	Liberal
18th	1935–1940	Joseph Thauvette	Liberal
19th	1940–1945	Joseph Thauvette	Liberal
20th	1945–1949	Louis-René Beaudoin	Liberal
21st	1949–1953	Louis-René Beaudoin	Liberal
22nd	1953–1957	Louis-René Beaudoin	Liberal
23rd	1957–1958	Louis-René Beaudoin	Liberal
24th	1958–1962	Marcel Bourbonnais	Progressive Conservative
25th	1962–1963	Marcel Bourbonnais	Progressive Conservative
26th	1963–1965	René Émard	Liberal
27th	1965–1968	René Émard	Liberal
Vaudreuil
28th	1968–1972	René Émard	Liberal
29th	1972–1974	Hal Herbert	Liberal
30th	1974–1979	Hal Herbert	Liberal
31st	1979–1980	Hal Herbert	Liberal
32nd	1980–1984	Hal Herbert	Liberal
33rd	1984–1988	Pierre Cadieux	Progressive Conservative
34th	1988–1993	Pierre Cadieux	Progressive Conservative
35th	1993–1997	Nick Discepola	Liberal
Vaudreuil-Soulanges
36th	1997–2000	Nick Discepola	Liberal
37th	2000–2004	Nick Discepola	Liberal
38th	2004–2006	Meili Faille	Bloc Québécois
39th	2006–2008	Meili Faille	Bloc Québécois
40th	2008–2011	Meili Faille	Bloc Québécois
41st	2011–2015	Jamie Nicholls (Note: Nicholls is now known as Jae due to gender transition.)	New Democratic
Vaudreuil—Soulanges
42nd	2015–2019	Peter Schiefke	Liberal
43rd	2019–2021	Peter Schiefke	Liberal
44th	2021–2025	Peter Schiefke	Liberal
Vaudreuil
45th	2025–present	Peter Schiefke	Liberal

== Election results ==
=== Vaudreuil, 2025-present ===
2025 Canadian federal election
Party	Candidate	Votes	%	±%	Expenditures
Liberal	Peter Schiefke	40,982	57.87	+10.40	$112,901.21
Conservative	Thomas Barré	16,179	22.85	+6.37	$3,651.27
Bloc Québécois	Christopher Massé	10,571	14.93	–6.03	$7,851.33
New Democratic	Kalden Dhatsenpa	1,602	2.26	–8.37	$0.00
Green	Dave Hamelin-Schuilenburg	957	1.35	–1.18	$1,744.20
People's	Jean Boily	527	0.74	N/A	$328.60
Total valid votes/expense limit		70,818	99.09	+0.93	$140,823.58
Total rejected ballots		652	0.91	–0.93	
Turnout		71,470	74.86	+8.16	
Eligible voters		95,475			
Liberal notional hold		Swing		+2.02	
Source: Elections Canada

2021 federal election redistributed results
Party	Vote	%
Liberal	28,437	47.47
Bloc Québécois	12,558	20.96
Conservative	9,870	16.47
New Democratic	6,372	10.64
Green	1,514	2.53
Free	1,158	1.93
Total valid votes	59,909	98.16
Rejected ballots	1,124	1.84
Registered voters/ estimated turnout	91,504	66.70

=== Vaudreuil—Soulanges, 2015–2025 ===
2021 Canadian federal election: Vaudreuil—Soulanges
Party	Candidate	Votes	%	±%	Expenditures
Liberal	Peter Schiefke	30,001	46.5	-0.8	$86,137.80
Bloc Québécois	Thierry Vadnais-Lapierre	14,308	22.2	-2.2	$2,242.01
Conservative	Karen Cox	10,556	16.3	+4.8	$10,931.31
New Democratic	Niklas Brake	6,780	10.5	-0.3	$403.80
Green	Cameron Stiff	1,631	2.5	-2.5	$1,085.30
Free	Ginette Destrempes	1,288	2.0	N/A	$399.41
Total valid votes/expense limit		64,564	98.1	–	$125,354.78
Total rejected ballots		1,233	1.9		
Turnout		65,797	66.9		
Eligible voters		98,289			
Liberal hold		Swing		+0.7	
Source: Elections Canada

2019 Canadian federal election: Vaudreuil—Soulanges
Party	Candidate	Votes	%	±%	Expenditures
Liberal	Peter Schiefke	32,254	47.3	+0.68	$108,254.46
Bloc Québécois	Noémie Rouillard	16,600	24.4	+9.36	none listed
Conservative	Karen Cox	7,804	11.5	-2.31	none listed
New Democratic	Amanda MacDonald	7,368	10.8	-11.51	none listed
Green	Cameron Stiff	3,405	5.0	+2.79	none listed
People's	Kaylin Tam	711	1.0		none listed
Total valid votes/expense limit		68,142	100.0		
Total rejected ballots		962			
Turnout		69,104	72.4		
Eligible voters		95,435			
Liberal hold		Swing		-4.34	
Source: Elections Canada

2015 Canadian federal election: Vaudreuil—Soulanges
Party	Candidate	Votes	%	±%	Expenditures
Liberal	Peter Schiefke	30,550	46.62	+34.23	–
New Democratic	Jamie Nicholls	14,627	22.31	-21.19	–
Bloc Québécois	Vincent François	9,858	15.04	-8.62	–
Conservative	Marc Boudreau	9,048	13.81	-3.8	–
Green	Jennifer Kaszel	1,445	2.21	-0.63	–
Total valid votes/expense limit		65,528	100.0		$231,083.77
Total rejected ballots		714	–	–	
Turnout		66,242	–	–	
Eligible voters		89,766			
Source: Elections Canada

2011 federal election redistributed results
Party	Vote	%
New Democratic	24,134	43.50
Bloc Québécois	13,129	23.66
Conservative	9,770	17.61
Liberal	6,873	12.39
Green	1,574	2.84

=== Vaudreuil-Soulanges, 1997–2015 ===
2011 Canadian federal election: Vaudreuil—Soulanges
Party	Candidate	Votes	%	±%	Expenditures
New Democratic	Jamie Nicholls (Note: Nicholls is now known as Jae due to gender transition.)	30,177	43.61	+33.98	
Bloc Québécois	Meili Faille	17,781	25.69	-15.65	
Conservative	Marc Boudreau	11,360	16.41	-7.28	
Liberal	Lyne Pelchat	8,023	11.59	-9.74	
Green	Jean-Yves Massenet	1,864	2.69	-1.32	
Total valid votes/expense limit		69,205	100.00		
Total rejected ballots		763	1.09		
Turnout		69,968	67.23		

2008 Canadian federal election: Vaudreuil—Soulanges
Party	Candidate	Votes	%	±%	Expenditures
Bloc Québécois	Meili Faille	27,044	41.34	-1.82	$80,072
Conservative	Michael Fortier	15,496	23.69	+4.69	$87,967
Liberal	Brigitte Legault	13,954	21.33	-6.96	$32,958
New Democratic	Maxime Héroux-Legault	6,298	9.63	+4.09	$1,519
Green	Jean-Yves Massenet	2,625	4.01	+0.10	$1,913
Total valid votes/expense limit		65,417	100.00	$96,487	
Total rejected ballots		729	1.10		
Turnout		66,146	67.76		

2006 Canadian federal election: Vaudreuil—Soulanges
Party	Candidate	Votes	%	±%	Expenditures
Bloc Québécois	Meili Faille	27,012	43.16	-1.13	$85,133
Liberal	Marc Garneau	17,768	28.39	-10.41	$79,413
Conservative	Stephane Bourgon	11,889	19.00	+10.81	$35,090
New Democratic	Bert Markgraf	3,468	5.54	+1.64	$3,385
Green	Pierre Pariseau-Legault	2,450	3.91	+0.14	$1,144
Total valid votes/expense limit		62,587	100.00	$85,543	

2004 Canadian federal election: Vaudreuil—Soulanges
Party	Candidate	Votes	%	±%	Expenditures
Bloc Québécois	Meili Faille	24,675	44.29	+4.31	$67,962
Liberal	Nick Discepola	21,613	38.80	-12.77	$57,607
Conservative	Robert Ramage	4,558	8.18	-3.99	$25,438
New Democratic	Bert Markgraf	2,175	3.90	+2.13	$2,698
Green	Julie C. Baribeau	2,103	3.77	–	$1,206
Marijuana	Charles Soucy	585	1.05	–	
Total valid votes/expense limit		55,709	100.00	$81,759	

Note: Conservative vote is compared to the total of the Canadian Alliance vote and Progressive Conservative vote in 2000 election.

2000 Canadian federal election: Vaudreuil—Soulanges
Party	Candidate	Votes	%	±%
Liberal	Nick Discepola	26,292	51.56	+6.56
Bloc Québécois	Éric Cimon	17,587	34.49	+1.09
Alliance	Dean Drysdale	4,188	8.21	+7.12
Progressive Conservative	Stratos Psarianos	2,020	3.96	-14.59
New Democratic	Shaun G. Lynch	904	1.77	+0.75
Total valid votes		50,991	100.00	

Note: Canadian Alliance vote is compared to the Reform vote in 1997 election.

1997 Canadian federal election: Vaudreuil—Soulanges
Party	Candidate	Votes	%
Liberal	Nick Discepola	23,676	45.00
Bloc Québécois	René St-Onge	17,574	33.40
Progressive Conservative	Jean Lajoie	9,760	18.55
Reform	Peter McLoughlin	573	1.09
New Democratic	Jason Sigurdson	538	1.02
Natural Law	Eric E. Simon	490	0.93
Total valid votes		52,611	100.00

=== Vaudreuil, 1968–1997 ===
1993 Canadian federal election: Vaudreuil
Party	Candidate	Votes
Liberal	Nick Discepola	31,120
Bloc Québécois	Mario Turbide	25,133
Progressive Conservative	Richard Préfontaine	6,459
New Democratic	Yves Marie Christin	1,107
Natural Law	Eric E. Simon	727
Libertarian	Neal Ford	438
Commonwealth of Canada	Robert Charles	186

1988 Canadian federal election: Vaudreuil
Party	Candidate	Votes
Progressive Conservative	Pierre Cadieux	30,392
Liberal	Jean Blais	16,393
New Democratic	Suzanne Aubertin	6,185
Green	Yves-Marie Christin	912
Rhinoceros	Maureen Decelles	671
Commonwealth of Canada	Isajlovic Momcilo	43

1984 Canadian federal election: Vaudreuil
Party	Candidate	Votes
Progressive Conservative	Pierre Cadieux	37,499
Liberal	Hal Herbert	20,362
New Democratic	Anne Erskine	7,993
Rhinoceros	Nicole B.D. Pans	1,470
Parti nationaliste	Benoît Duchesne	1,017
Libertarian	Gordon Gouldson	345
Commonwealth of Canada	Jacques Cartier	139

1980 Canadian federal election: Vaudreuil
Party	Candidate	Votes
Liberal	Hal Herbert	39,159
New Democratic	Lorne Brown	7,309
Progressive Conservative	Thomas Thé	6,277
Union populaire	Guy Cousineau	513
Libertarian	Irena Bubniuk	479
Marxist–Leninist	Michelle Duford	234
lop.parl.ca

1979 Canadian federal election: Vaudreuil
Party	Candidate	Votes
Liberal	Hal Herbert	41,508
Progressive Conservative	Diana Togneri	7,787
New Democratic	Lorne Brown	4,512
Social Credit	Mario G. Turbide	3,625
Rhinoceros	Claude Simard	1,177
Libertarian	Claude Lévesque	437
Union populaire	Jérome Chaput	237

1974 Canadian federal election: Vaudreuil
Party	Candidate	Votes
Liberal	Hal Herbert	29,685
Progressive Conservative	Ron Brown	12,422
New Democratic	Tom Rees	4,397
Social Credit	Sarah Audet	2,752
Independent	Gaëtan Boyer	805

1972 Canadian federal election: Vaudreuil
Party	Candidate	Votes
Liberal	Hal Herbert	27,372
Progressive Conservative	Jeannette-T. Burley	11,477
Social Credit	Joseph-Endré De Csavossy	4,526
New Democratic	Michel Beauséjour	3,573
Independent	André Théoret	3,066
Independent	Walter J. Williams	330

1968 Canadian federal election: Vaudreuil
Party	Candidate	Votes
Liberal	René Émard	29,830
Progressive Conservative	Harold G. Fairhead	7,654
New Democratic	Maurice Daviau	2,905

=== Vaudreuil—Soulanges, 1917–1968 ===
1965 Canadian federal election: Vaudreuil—Soulanges
Party	Candidate	Votes	%	±%
Liberal	René Émard	8,955	50.79	+1.04
Progressive Conservative	Marcel Bourbonnais	6,580	37.32	+2.59
New Democratic	Roger Carrier	1,346	7.63	
Ralliement créditiste	Jean-Marie Veilleux	750	4.25	-9.22
Total valid votes		17,631	100.00	

Note: Ralliement créditiste vote is compared to Social Credit vote in the 1963 election.

1963 Canadian federal election: Vaudreuil—Soulanges
Party	Candidate	Votes	%	±%
Liberal	René Émard	8,639	49.75	+3.72
Progressive Conservative	J.-Marcel Bourbonnais	6,031	34.73	-12.81
Social Credit	Marcel Lessard	2,340	13.48	+7.05
Independent	Gérard Raymond	354	2.04	
Total valid votes		17,364	100.00	

1962 Canadian federal election: Vaudreuil—Soulanges
Party	Candidate	Votes	%	±%
Progressive Conservative	J.-Marcel Bourbonnais	8,392	47.54	-5.33
Liberal	Pierre Léger	8,126	46.03	-1.09
Social Credit	Gabriel Godin	1,135	6.43	
Total valid votes		17,653	100.00	

1958 Canadian federal election: Vaudreuil—Soulanges
Party	Candidate	Votes	%	±%
Progressive Conservative	Marcel Bourbonnais	8,161	52.87	+21.36
Liberal	Armand Asselin	7,274	47.13	-21.36
Total valid votes		15,435	100.00	

1957 Canadian federal election: Vaudreuil—Soulanges
Party	Candidate	Votes	%	±%
Liberal	Louis-René Beaudoin	9,055	68.49	-10.48
Progressive Conservative	Marcel Bourbonnais	4,166	31.51	+10.48
Total valid votes		13,221	100.00	

1953 Canadian federal election: Vaudreuil—Soulanges
Party	Candidate	Votes	%	±%
Liberal	Louis-René Beaudoin	8,463	78.97	+11.40
Progressive Conservative	Roger-Paul Sullivan	2,254	21.03	-11.40
Total valid votes		10,717	100.00	

1949 Canadian federal election: Vaudreuil—Soulanges
Party	Candidate	Votes	%	±%
Liberal	Louis-René Beaudoin	7,622	67.56	+4.62
Progressive Conservative	J.-Omer Lalonde	3,659	32.44	
Total valid votes		11,281	100.00	

1945 Canadian federal election: Vaudreuil—Soulanges
Party	Candidate	Votes	%	±%
Liberal	Louis-René Beaudoin	6,267	62.94	+14.75
Independent	Jean Lamarche	1,880	18.88	
Bloc populaire	Robert Stocker	1,619	16.26	
Co-operative Commonwealth	J.-Albert Bourbonnais	191	1.92	
Total valid votes		9,957	100.00	

1940 Canadian federal election: Vaudreuil—Soulanges
Party	Candidate	Votes	%	±%
Liberal	Joseph Thauvette	4,381	48.19	-19.95
National Government	J.-E.-Philippe Deguire	2,210	24.31	-4.38
Independent Liberal	Édouard Charlebois	1,441	15.85	
Independent Liberal	J.-Ernest Chevrier	1,059	11.65	
Total valid votes		9,091	100.00	

Note: "National Government" vote is compared to Conservative vote in 1935 election.

1935 Canadian federal election: Vaudreuil—Soulanges
Party	Candidate	Votes	%	±%
Liberal	Joseph Thauvette	5,983	68.14	+17.17
Conservative	Horace-Joseph Gagné	2,519	28.69	-0.05
Reconstruction	Albert Lacombe	279	3.18	
Total valid votes		8,781	100.00	

1930 Canadian federal election: Vaudreuil—Soulanges
Party	Candidate	Votes	%	±%
Liberal	Joseph Thauvette	4,313	50.96	-17.07
Conservative	Horace-Joseph Gagné	2,432	28.74	
Independent Liberal	Roland-Gilles Mousseau	1,718	20.30	-6.95
Total valid votes		8,463	100.00	

Canadian federal by-election, 29 July 1929
Party	Candidate	Votes	%	±%
On Mr. Wilson's resignation, 1 February 1929
Liberal	Lawrence Alexander Wilson	4,409	68.03	-6.44
Independent Liberal	Roland-Gilles Mousseau	1,766	27.25	
Independent Liberal	Émile Gagné	306	4.72	
Total valid votes		6,481	100.00	

1926 Canadian federal election: Vaudreuil—Soulanges
Party	Candidate	Votes	%	±%
Liberal	Lawrence Alexander Wilson	5,391	74.47	-2.23
Conservative	Eugène Leroux	1,848	25.53	+2.23
Total valid votes		7,239	100.00	

1925 Canadian federal election: Vaudreuil—Soulanges
Party	Candidate	Votes	%	±%
Liberal	Lawrence Alexander Wilson	5,554	76.70	+13.17
Conservative	Eugène Leroux	1,687	23.30	
Total valid votes		7,241	100.00	

Note: Change in popular vote is calculated from popular vote in the 1921 general election.

1921 Canadian federal election: Vaudreuil—Soulanges
Party	Candidate	Votes	%	±%
Liberal	Gustave Benjamin Boyer	5,366	63.53	-27.37
Independent	Adrien Pharand	2,787	33.00	
Progressive	Julien Charlebois	293	3.47	
Total valid votes		8,446	100.00	

By-election on 21 March 1922 On Mr. Boyer being called to the Senate, 11 March 1922
Party	Candidate	Votes
Liberal	Joseph-Rodolphe Ouimet	acclaimed

Note: Liberal vote is compared to Opposition vote in 1917 general election.

1917 Canadian federal election
Party	Candidate	Votes	%
Opposition (Laurier Liberals)	Gustave Benjamin Boyer	4,075	90.90
Government (Unionist)	Julien-Firmin Bissonnette	408	9.10
Total valid votes		4,483	100.00

=== Vaudreuil, 1867–1914 ===
1911 Canadian federal election: Vaudreuil
Party	Candidate	Votes
Liberal	Gustave Benjamin Boyer	1,345
Conservative	Archibald de Léry Macdonald	1,130

1908 Canadian federal election: Vaudreuil
Party	Candidate	Votes
Liberal	Gustave Benjamin Boyer	1,408
Conservative	Elzéar Montpetit	655

1904 Canadian federal election: Vaudreuil
Party	Candidate	Votes
Liberal	Gustave Benjamin Boyer	1,297
Conservative	François de Sales-Alphonse Bastien	825

1900 Canadian federal election: Vaudreuil
Party	Candidate	Votes
Liberal	Henry Stanislas Harwood	1,140
Conservative	Alfred Lapointe	665

1896 Canadian federal election: Vaudreuil
Party	Candidate	Votes
Liberal	Henry Stanislas Harwood	1,296
Conservative	Aldéric Séguin	801

By-election on 12 April 1893 On election being declared void, 1 March 1893
Party	Candidate	Votes
Liberal	Henry Stanislas Harwood	acclaimed

By-election on 29 February 1892 On Mr. Harwood being unseated, 8 January 1892
Party	Candidate	Votes
Conservative	Hugh McMillan	acclaimed

1891 Canadian federal election: Vaudreuil
Party	Candidate	Votes
Liberal	Henry Stanislas Harwood	1,087
Conservative	Hugh McMillan	989

1887 Canadian federal election: Vaudreuil
Party	Candidate	Votes
Conservative	Hugh McMillan	996
Liberal	E. Lalonde	783

1882 Canadian federal election: Vaudreuil
Party	Candidate	Votes
Conservative	Hugh McMillan	522
Unknown	Alfred Lapointe	490
Unknown	F.X. Archambault	418
Unknown	H.A. Desrosiers	10

1878 Canadian federal election: Vaudreuil
Party	Candidate	Votes
Conservative	Jean-Baptiste Mongenais	764
Liberal–Conservative	Robert Harwood	702

1874 Canadian federal election: Vaudreuil
Party	Candidate	Votes
Liberal–Conservative	Robert Harwood	acclaimed
Source: lop.parl.ca

1872 Canadian federal election: Vaudreuil
Party	Candidate	Votes
Liberal–Conservative	Robert Harwood	962
Unknown	Alfred Lapointe (Godard)	727
Source: Canadian Elections Database

1867 Canadian federal election: Vaudreuil
Party	Candidate	Votes
Conservative	Donald McMillan	acclaimed
Source: Canadian Elections Database

== See also ==
- List of Canadian electoral districts
- Historical federal electoral districts of Canada
