= Monique Vézina =

Canadian politician (1935–2024)

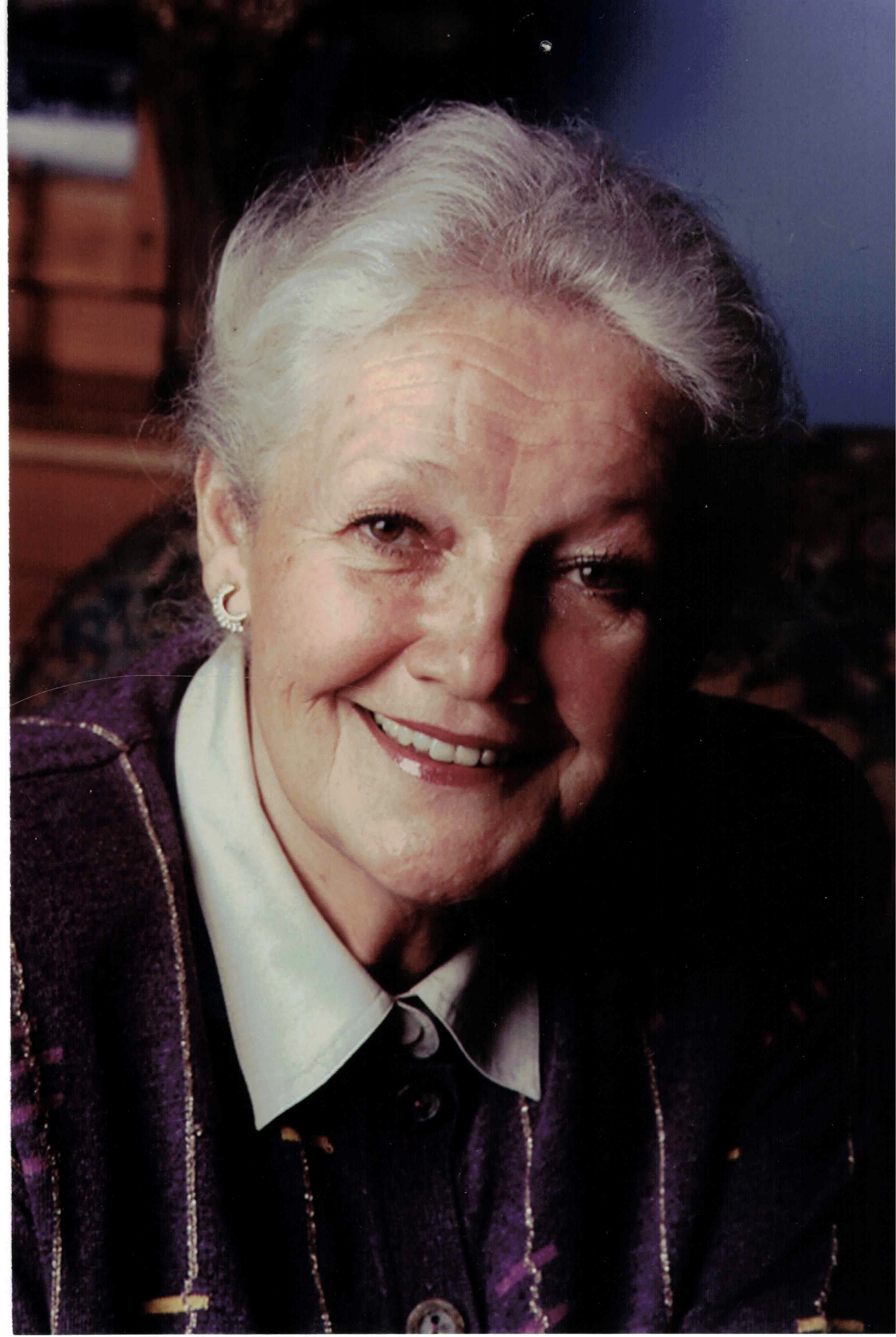
Monique Vézina

Monique Vézina, PC OQ (July 13, 1935 – December 15, 2024) was a Canadian politician and cabinet minister in the government of Brian Mulroney. She subsequently worked with a non-governmental organization in the field of international development.

== Life and career ==
Vézina was born in Rimouski, Quebec on July 13, 1935. Prior to entering politics, she worked for numerous community agencies in the fields of education, family services and women's rights in the Lower Saint Lawrence River valley region of Quebec. In 1976, she became chair of the Federation of the Caisses Populaires Desjardins (a credit union organization) in her region, and joined the executive of the Quebec-wide Mouvement Desjardins. From 1978 to 1982, she served as a member of the Conseil supérieur de l’éducation and as vice-president of the Régie de l’assurance automobile du Québec.

Vézina entered politics in the 1984 general election being elected as the Progressive Conservative Member of Parliament for Rimouski—Témiscouata. She was one of a number of Quebec nationalists recruited to the PC Party as part of the creation of a coalition that could win power. She was appointed to the first Cabinet of Prime Minister Brian Mulroney as Minister of External Relations (a junior portfolio to the Secretary of State for External Affairs), and as Minister responsible for La Francophonie. Her focus in Cabinet was in the field of international development.

In 1986, she became Minister of Supply and Services. From 1987 to 1993, she held a succession of junior portfolios as a Minister of State first for Transport (1987–1988), for Employment and Immigration (1988–1993), and for Seniors (1988–1993). From January to June 1993, she again served as Minister for External Relations and Minister responsible for la Francophonie. She decided not to remain in politics following Mulroney's retirement, and left Cabinet in June 1993 when Kim Campbell became PC leader and prime minister. Vézina did not run in the 1993 general election.

After leaving politics, Vézina remained active in the field of international development as a member of the board of directors of the Montreal-based Centre d’éducation et de coopération internationale from 1994 to 1997. In 1995, she chaired the Commission des aînés and the Commission nationale sur l’avenir du Québec, bodies set up by the Parti Québécois government of Quebec in preparation for the 1995 Quebec referendum. The next year, she was elected Patriote de l’année by the Quebec nationalist Société Saint-Jean-Baptiste de Montréal, and was named a member of l’Ordre du mérite coopératif québécois.

In 1998, Vézina caused controversy in English Canada by stating that she had never been a Canadian federalist.

Vézina served as vice-president of the Conseil des relations internationales de Montréal, president of the Mouvement national des Québécoises et Québécois and of the Conférence des peuples de langue française. She died on December 15, 2024, at the age of 89.

== Honours ==
In 2007, she was made an Officer of the National Order of Quebec.

Parliament of Canada
Preceded by Eva Côté	Member of Parliament for Rimouski—Témiscouata; 1984–1993	Succeeded by Suzanne Tremblay
Political offices
Preceded by Stewart McInnes	Minister of Supply and Services; 1986–1987	Succeeded by Michel Côté
