= Rimouski (federal electoral district) =

Former federal electoral district in Quebec, Canada

Quebec electoral district

Defunct federal electoral district
- Legislature: House of Commons
- District created: 1867
- District abolished: 2003
- First contested: 1867
- Last contested: 2000

Rimouski (French pronunciation: [ʁimuski]; also known as Rimouski—Témiscouata, Rimouski—Mitis and Rimouski-Neigette-et-la Mitis) was a federal electoral district in Quebec, Canada, that was represented in the House of Commons of Canada from 1867 to 2003.

It was created by the British North America Act, 1867 as "Rimouski" riding.

After the 1980 federal election, it was renamed "Rimouski—Témiscouata". In 1996, it was renamed "Rimouski", and before the 1997 election, it was renamed "Rimouski—Mitis". Before the 2000 election, it was renamed "Rimouski-Neigette-et-la Mitis".

It was abolished in 2003 when it was redistributed into Rimouski—Témiscouata and Matapédia—Matane ridings.

== Members of Parliament ==
This riding has elected the following members of Parliament:

| Parliament | Years | Member | Party |
|---|---|---|---|
Rimouski
| 1st | 1867–1872 | George Sylvain | Conservative |
| 2nd | 1872–1874 | Jean-Baptiste Romuald Fiset | Liberal |
| 3rd | 1874–1878 | Jean-Baptiste Romuald Fiset | Liberal |
| 4th | 1878–1882 | Jean-Baptiste Romuald Fiset | Liberal |
| 5th | 1882–1887 | Louis Adolphe Billy | Conservative |
| 6th | 1887–1891 | Jean-Baptiste Romuald Fiset | Liberal |
| 7th | 1891–1896 | Adolph-Philippe Caron | Conservative |
| 8th | 1896–1897 | Jean-Baptiste Romuald Fiset | Liberal |
| 8th | 1897–1900 | Jean Auguste Ross | Liberal |
| 9th | 1900–1904 | Jean Auguste Ross | Liberal |
| 10th | 1904–1908 | Jean Auguste Ross | Liberal |
| 11th | 1908–1911 | Jean Auguste Ross | Liberal |
| 12th | 1911–1917 | Herménégilde Boulay | Conservative |
| 13th | 1917–1921 | Émmanuel d'Anjou | Opposition (Laurier Liberals) |
| 14th | 1921–1924 | Émmanuel d'Anjou | Liberal |
| 14th | 1924–1925 | Eugène Fiset | Liberal |
| 15th | 1925–1926 | Eugène Fiset | Liberal |
| 16th | 1926–1930 | Eugène Fiset | Liberal |
| 17th | 1930–1935 | Eugène Fiset | Liberal |
| 18th | 1935–1940 | Eugène Fiset | Liberal |
| 19th | 1940–1944 | Émmanuel d'Anjou | Liberal |
| 19th | 1944–1945 | Émmanuel d'Anjou | Bloc populaire |
| 19th | 1945–1945 | Émmanuel d'Anjou | Independent |
| 20th | 1945–1949 | Gleason Belzile | Liberal |
| 21st | 1949–1950 | Gleason Belzile | Liberal |
| 21st | 1950–1953 | Joseph Hervé Rousseau | Independent Liberal |
| 22nd | 1953–1957 | Gérard Légaré | Liberal |
| 23rd | 1957–1958 | Gérard Légaré | Liberal |
| 24th | 1958–1962 | Émilien Morissette | Progressive Conservative |
| 25th | 1962–1963 | Gérard Légaré | Liberal |
| 26th | 1963–1964 | Gérard Ouellet | Social Credit |
| 26th | 1964–1965 | Gérard Ouellet | Progressive Conservative |
| 27th | 1965–1968 | Louis Guy LeBlanc | Liberal |
| 28th | 1968–1972 | Louis Guy LeBlanc | Liberal |
| 29th | 1972–1974 | Eudore Allard | Social Credit |
| 30th | 1974–1979 | Eudore Allard | Social Credit |
| 31st | 1979–1980 | Eudore Allard | Social Credit |
| 32nd | 1980–1984 | Eva Côté | Liberal |
Rimouski—Témiscouata
| 33rd | 1984–1988 | Monique Vézina | Progressive Conservative |
| 34th | 1988–1993 | Monique Vézina | Progressive Conservative |
| 35th | 1993–1997 | Suzanne Tremblay | Bloc Québécois |
Rimouski—Mitis
| 36th | 1997–2000 | Suzanne Tremblay | Bloc Québécois |
Rimouski—Neigette-et-la Mitis
| 37th | 2000–2004 | Suzanne Tremblay | Bloc Québécois |
Riding dissolved into Haute-Gaspésie—La Mitis—Matane—Matapédia and Rimouski-Neigette—Témiscouata—Les Basques

== Election results ==
=== Rimouski ===
1867 Canadian federal election
| Party | Candidate | Votes |
|---|---|---|
| Conservative | George Sylvain | 1,152 |
| Unknown | A. Michaud | 697 |
| Eligible voters | | 2,753 |
Source: Canadian Parliamentary Guide, 1871

1872 Canadian federal election
| Party | Candidate | Votes |
|---|---|---|
| Liberal | Jean-Baptiste Romuald Fiset | 1,381 |
| Conservative | George Sylvain | 1,150 |

1874 Canadian federal election
| Party | Candidate | Votes |
|---|---|---|
| Liberal | Jean-Baptiste Romuald Fiset | 1,728 |
| Unknown | A.P. Letendre | 354 |

1878 Canadian federal election
| Party | Candidate | Votes |
|---|---|---|
| Liberal | Jean-Baptiste Romuald Fiset | 2,003 |
| Conservative | Hector-Louis Langevin | 1,554 |

1882 Canadian federal election
| Party | Candidate | Votes |
|---|---|---|
| Conservative | Louis Adolphe Billy | 1,648 |
| Liberal | Jean-Baptiste Romuald Fiset | 1,540 |

1887 Canadian federal election
| Party | Candidate | Votes |
|---|---|---|
| Liberal | Jean-Baptiste Romuald Fiset | 2,228 |
| Conservative | Louis Taché | 1,660 |

1891 Canadian federal election
| Party | Candidate | Votes |
|---|---|---|
| Conservative | Adolph-Philippe Caron | 2,061 |
| Liberal | Jean-Baptiste Romuald Fiset | 1,799 |

1896 Canadian federal election
| Party | Candidate | Votes |
|---|---|---|
| Liberal | Jean-Baptiste Romuald Fiset | 2,443 |
| Conservative | Louis Taché | 2,177 |

By-election on 6 November 1897 On Fiset being summoned to the Senate, 20 October 1897
| Party | Candidate | Votes |
| Liberal | Jean Auguste Ross | acclaimed |

1900 Canadian federal election
| Party | Candidate | Votes |
|---|---|---|
| Liberal | Jean Auguste Ross | 2,794 |
| Conservative | Louis Taché | 2,525 |

1904 Canadian federal election
| Party | Candidate | Votes |
|---|---|---|
| Liberal | Jean Auguste Ross | 3,272 |
| Conservative | William Price | 3,006 |

1908 Canadian federal election
| Party | Candidate | Votes |
|---|---|---|
| Liberal | Jean Auguste Ross | 3,737 |
| Conservative | Herménégilde Boulay | 3,148 |

1911 Canadian federal election
| Party | Candidate | Votes |
|---|---|---|
| Conservative | Herménégilde Boulay | 4,179 |
| Liberal | Jean Auguste Ross | 3,747 |

1917 Canadian federal election
| Party | Candidate | Votes |
|---|---|---|
| Opposition (Laurier Liberals) | Joseph-Émile-Stanislas-Émmanuel D'Anjou | acclaimed |

1921 Canadian federal election
| Party | Candidate | Votes |
|---|---|---|
| Liberal | Joseph-Émile-Stanislas-Émmanuel D'Anjou | 6,363 |
| Progressive | Alfred Lavoie | 1,247 |

By-election on 2 September 1924 On D'Anjou's acceptance of the Registrar of Deeds for the County of Rimouski, 19 July 1924
| Party | Candidate | Votes |
| Liberal | Eugène Fiset | 5,701 |
| Conservative | Jean-Marie Joseph Elzéar Sasseville | 3,876 |

1925 Canadian federal election
| Party | Candidate | Votes |
|---|---|---|
| Liberal | Eugène Fiset | 5,142 |
| Conservative | Gérard Simard | 3,167 |

1926 Canadian federal election
| Party | Candidate | Votes |
|---|---|---|
| Liberal | Eugène Fiset | 5,623 |
| Conservative | Alphonse Garon | 2,926 |
| Independent | Alphonse Aubin | 417 |

1930 Canadian federal election
| Party | Candidate | Votes |
|---|---|---|
| Liberal | Eugène Fiset | 6,257 |
| Conservative | Herménégilde Boulay | 4,722 |

1935 Canadian federal election
| Party | Candidate | Votes |
|---|---|---|
| Liberal | Eugène Fiset | 9,238 |
| Conservative | René-Édouard Asselin | 4,495 |
| Reconstruction | Georges-Arthur Morin | 732 |

1940 Canadian federal election
| Party | Candidate | Votes |
|---|---|---|
| Liberal | Joseph-Émile-Stanislas-Émmanuel D'Anjou | 9,766 |
| Conservative | Jean Blanchet | 5,928 |

1945 Canadian federal election
| Party | Candidate | Votes |
|---|---|---|
| Liberal | Gleason Belzile | 10,730 |
| Independent | Joseph-Émile-Stanislas-Émmanuel D'Anjou | 8,084 |
| Social Credit | Joseph-Arthur Couture | 834 |

1949 Canadian federal election
| Party | Candidate | Votes |
|---|---|---|
| Liberal | Gleason Belzile | 11,708 |
| Progressive Conservative | Adrien Gagné | 7,389 |
| Independent Liberal | J.-E.-S.-Emmanuel D'Anjou | 3,614 |
| Union des électeurs | Aurélien Gagné | 1,491 |

By-election on 16 October 1950 On Belzile's death, 25 July 1950
| Party | Candidate | Votes |
| Independent Liberal | Joseph Hervé Rousseau | 9,976 |
| Liberal | Maurice Tessier | 9,431 |
| Independent | Lucien Robitaille | 1,124 |

1953 Canadian federal election
| Party | Candidate | Votes |
|---|---|---|
| Liberal | Gérard Légaré | 8,554 |
| Progressive Conservative | Dérome Asselin | 8,201 |
| Independent Liberal | Joseph-Hervé Rousseau | 5,478 |
| Independent Liberal | Blaise Lavoie | 1,668 |

1957 Canadian federal election
| Party | Candidate | Votes |
|---|---|---|
| Liberal | Gérard Légaré | 14,642 |
| Progressive Conservative | Dérome Asselin | 9,754 |

1958 Canadian federal election
| Party | Candidate | Votes |
|---|---|---|
| Progressive Conservative | Émilien Morissette | 16,426 |
| Liberal | Gérard Légaré | 11,503 |
| Social Credit | Jean-Nil Jean | 534 |

1962 Canadian federal election
| Party | Candidate | Votes |
|---|---|---|
| Liberal | Gérard Légaré | 9,955 |
| Social Credit | Gérard Ouellet | 9,171 |
| Progressive Conservative | Émilien Morissette | 8,956 |
| New Democratic | Maurice Loyer | 393 |

1963 Canadian federal election
| Party | Candidate | Votes |
|---|---|---|
| Social Credit | Gérard Ouellet | 12,414 |
| Liberal | Gérard Légaré | 12,274 |
| Progressive Conservative | Fernand Dionne | 3,192 |
| New Democratic | Raymond D'Auteuil | 1,297 |

1965 Canadian federal election
| Party | Candidate | Votes |
|---|---|---|
| Liberal | Guy Leblanc | 11,372 |
| Ralliement créditiste | J.A. Young | 7,245 |
| New Democratic | Raymond D'Auteuil | 6,783 |
| Progressive Conservative | Gérard Ouellet | 1,477 |

1968 Canadian federal election
| Party | Candidate | Votes |
|---|---|---|
| Liberal | Guy Leblanc | 12,073 |
| Progressive Conservative | Gilles Carle | 9,445 |
| Ralliement créditiste | Félix Gagnon | 2,937 |

1972 Canadian federal election
| Party | Candidate | Votes |
|---|---|---|
| Social Credit | Eudore Allard | 13,241 |
| Liberal | Guy Leblanc | 11,097 |
| Progressive Conservative | Blondin Laplante | 5,657 |
| New Democratic | J.-Adalbert Beaulieu | 732 |

1974 Canadian federal election
| Party | Candidate | Votes |
|---|---|---|
| Social Credit | Eudore Allard | 15,085 |
| Liberal | Sandy Burgess | 13,698 |
| Progressive Conservative | Henri-Paul Lepage | 893 |
| New Democratic | Serge Bernier | 528 |
| Independent | Robert Corneau | 410 |
| Marxist–Leninist | Jules Painchaud | 89 |

1979 Canadian federal election
| Party | Candidate | Votes |
|---|---|---|
| Social Credit | Eudore Allard | 16,821 |
| Liberal | Eva Côté | 16,716 |
| Progressive Conservative | Jean Brisson | 2,556 |
| New Democratic | Guy Poulin | 492 |
| Rhinoceros | Renaud Guénette | 455 |
| Union populaire | Nicolas Lavoie | 80 |

1980 Canadian federal election
| Party | Candidate | Votes |
|---|---|---|
| Liberal | Eva Côté | 21,482 |
| Social Credit | Eudore Allard | 10,839 |
| Progressive Conservative | Jacques Blanchard | 3,999 |
| New Democratic | René Mcdonald | 1,155 |
| Rhinoceros | Jacques Saintonge | 627 |
| Independent | Régine Valois | 166 |
| Marxist–Leninist | Normand Fournier | 74 |

=== Rimouski—Témiscouata ===
1984 Canadian federal election
| Party | Candidate | Votes |
|---|---|---|
| Progressive Conservative | Monique Vézina | 25,516 |
| Liberal | Eva Côté | 14,234 |
| New Democratic | Guy Poulin | 1,250 |
| Parti nationaliste | Pierre Bouchard | 840 |
| Rhinoceros | Jacques St-Onge | 752 |
| Commonwealth of Canada | Marc Carrier | 64 |

1988 Canadian federal election
| Party | Candidate | Votes |
|---|---|---|
| Progressive Conservative | Monique Vézina | 23,789 |
| Liberal | Eva Côté | 10,561 |
| New Democratic | Pierre Boisjoli | 2,417 |
| Independent | Eudore Allard | 1,210 |

1993 Canadian federal election
| Party | Candidate | Votes |
|---|---|---|
| Bloc Québécois | Suzanne Tremblay | 23,118 |
| Liberal | André Reid | 9,454 |
| Progressive Conservative | Jean Morin | 4,622 |
| Independent | François-Michel Denis | 598 |
| Natural Law | Gilles Roussel | 400 |
| New Democratic | Alex En Hwa Ng | 335 |

=== Rimouski—Mitis ===
1997 Canadian federal election
| Party | Candidate | Votes | % | ±% | Expenditures |
|---|---|---|---|---|---|
| Bloc Québécois | Suzanne Tremblay | 17,282 | 47.00 | | $53,089 |
| Liberal | Réal Marmen | 11,112 | 30.22 | – | $47,800 |
| Progressive Conservative | Jean Roy | 7,901 | 21.49 | | $32,225 |
| New Democratic | Elizabeth Clark | 479 | 1.30 | | $0 |
| Total valid votes | | 36,774 | 100.00 | | |
| Total rejected ballots | | 1,211 | | | |
| Turnout | | 37,985 | 68.24 | | |
| Electors on the lists | | 55,665 | | | |
Sources: Official Results, Elections Canada and Financial Returns, Elections Canada.

=== Rimouski—Neigette-et-la Mitis ===
2000 Canadian federal election
| Party | Candidate | Votes |
|---|---|---|
| Bloc Québécois | Suzanne Tremblay | 19,759 |
| Liberal | Réal Marmen | 9,795 |
| Alliance | Gerard Gosselin | 1,280 |
| Progressive Conservative | Réal Blais | 1,150 |
| Natural Law | Lyse Beauchemin | 673 |
| New Democratic | René Lemieux | 525 |

== See also ==
- List of Canadian electoral districts
- Historical federal electoral districts of Canada
