= Gleason Belzile =

Canadian politician (1898–1950)

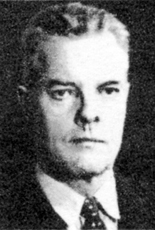

Member of the Canadian Parliament for Rimouski
- In office 1945–1950
- Preceded by: Joseph-Émile-Stanislas-Émmanuel D'Anjou
- Succeeded by: Joseph Hervé Rousseau

Personal details
- Born: August 30, 1898 Rimouski, Quebec, Canada
- Died: July 25, 1950 (aged 51)
- Party: Liberal
- Occupation: notary

Gleason Belzile (August 30, 1898 – July 25, 1950) was a Canadian politician and notary. He was elected to the House of Commons of Canada in 1945 as a Member of the Liberal Party to represent the riding of Rimouski. He was re-elected in 1949. He was made Parliamentary Assistant to the Minister of Finance for three terms. He died while in office and a by-election was held in which Joseph Hervé Rousseau succeeded him.
