= Émmanuel d'Anjou =

Canadian politician

Member of Parliament for Rimouski
- In office 25 March 1940 – 10 June 1945
- Preceded by: Eugène Fiset
- Succeeded by: Gleason Belzile
- In office 17 December 1917 – 19 July 1924
- Preceded by: Herménégilde Boulay
- Succeeded by: Eugène Fiset

Personal details
- Born: Joseph-Émile-Stanislas-Émmanuel d'Anjou; 31 March 1884 Saint-Fabien-de-Rimouski, Quebec, Canada
- Died: 19 November 1966 (aged 82)
- Party: Laurier Liberals (1917–1921); Liberal (1921–1944); Bloc populaire (1944–1945); Independent (1945–1949)
- Profession: insurance agent and broker

Joseph-Émile-Stanislas-Émmanuel d'Anjou (31 March 1884 – 19 November 1966) was an Independent Liberal, Independent, Liberal and Laurier Liberal member of the House of Commons of Canada. He was born in Saint-Fabien-de-Rimouski, Quebec and was employed as an insurance broker.

D'Anjou attended Seminary at Rimouski, then Université Laval. He became Secretary and President of the Young Liberal Association of Quebec.

He was first elected to Parliament at the Rimouski riding in the 1917 general election, initially under the "Laurier Liberal" banner used as a result of the Conscription Crisis of 1917 which split the Liberals into pro-conscription Liberal Unionists and anti-conscription "Laurier Liberal" factions. He was re-elected there in 1921 as a Liberal. d'Anjou resigned on 4 October 1924 to open the seat for Eugène Fiset.

Fifteen years later, after Fiset resigned from Parliament to become Quebec's Lieutenant-Governor, d'Anjou returned to the Rimouski riding, winning in the 1940 election. On 22 June 1944, as a result of the Conscription Crisis of 1944, d'Anjou left the Liberals and crossed the floor to join the Bloc populaire which opposed conscription during World War II. By the end of his term in the 19th Canadian Parliament, d'Anjou left the Bloc and aligned with an independent anti-conscription candidates group headed by Frédéric Dorion. D'Anjou ran as an independent candidate at Rimouski in the 1945 election, but lost to Gleason Belzile of the Liberals. d'Anjou was also unsuccessful in unseating Belzile in 1949.
