= George di Madeiros Loy =

Canadian politician

Member of the Canadian Parliament for Beauharnois
- In office 1900–1904
- Preceded by: Joseph Gédéon Horace Bergeron
- Succeeded by: Joseph Gédéon Horace Bergeron

Personal details
- Born: 27 November 1840 Coteau Landing, Lower Canada
- Died: 14 December 1936 (aged 96)
- Party: Liberal

George di Madeiros Loy (27 November 1840 – 14 December 1936) was a farmer and political figure in Quebec. He represented Beauharnois in the House of Commons of Canada from 1900 to 1904 as a Liberal.

He was born in Coteau-Landing, Lower Canada, the son of a Portuguese father and American mother. Loy was educated in Coteau-Landing and Ogdensburg, New York. In 1868, he married Elizabeth Wilson. He was mayor of Valleyfield from 1894 to 1899. His election in 1900 was declared void in 1902 but Loy won the subsequent by-election. He was defeated when he ran for reelection in 1904.

Loy also operated a paper mill in Valleyfield owned by Alexander Buntin.

1900 Canadian federal election: Beauharnois
Party	Candidate	Votes	%	±%
Liberal	George di Madeiros Loy	2,016		
Conservative	Joseph-Gédéon-Horace Bergeron	1,739		

By-election on election being declared void, 26 March 1902
Party	Candidate	Votes	%	±%
Liberal	George di Madeiros Loy	1,822		
Conservative	Joseph-Gédéon-Horace Bergeron	1,663		

1900 Canadian federal election: Beauharnois
Party	Candidate	Votes	%	±%
Liberal	George di Madeiros Loy	2,016		
Conservative	Joseph-Gédéon-Horace Bergeron	1,739		

1904 Canadian federal election: Beauharnois
Party	Candidate	Votes	%	±%
Conservative	Joseph-Gédéon-Horace Bergeron	2,075		
Liberal	George di Madeiros Loy	1,828		

1908 Canadian federal election: Beauharnois
Party	Candidate	Votes	%	±%
Liberal	Louis-Joseph Papineau	1,843		
Conservative	Joseph-Gédéon-Horace Bergeron	1,814		
