= Louis LeBlanc =

Louis LeBlanc may refer to:

- Louis Leblanc (born 1991), Canadian ice hockey player
- Louis Guy LeBlanc (1921–1990), Canadian politician
