= Eudore Allard =

Canadian politician

Member of the Canadian Parliament for Rimouski
- In office 1972–1980
- Preceded by: Louis Guy LeBlanc
- Succeeded by: Eva Côté

Personal details
- Born: 27 August 1915 Carleton, Quebec
- Died: 17 September 2001 (aged 86)
- Party: Social Credit

Eudore Allard (27 August 1915 – 17 September 2001) was a Social Credit Party member of the House of Commons of Canada. He was born in Carleton, Quebec and became a sales representative and hotel operator by career.

He initially attempted to enter Parliament at the Matapédia—Matane electoral district in the 1962 and 1963 federal elections but was unsuccessful.

Allard won the Rimouski riding in the 1972 election and was re-elected there in the 1974 and 1979 elections defeating Sandy Burgess and Eva Côté respectively. After serving terms in the 29th, 30th and 31st Canadian Parliaments, Allard was defeated in the 1980 election by Liberal party candidate Côté.

His final attempt to re-enter Canadian Parliament was made at the Rimouski—Témiscouata riding in the 1988 federal election as an independent candidate.
