= Sandy Burgess =

Canadian radio personality

Sandy Burgess was a Québécois radio personality known for his populist rhetoric and being an ardent Québécois nationalist while still supporting Federalism.

== Biography ==
Burgess was born in 1931 in Rimouski, Quebec. (Note: The Burgess family traces lineage back to René Lepage de Sainte-Claire, the original French colonial Burgess of Rimouski.) He had initially studied at the Rimouski Seminary in order to become a Catholic priest, however, pivoted to radio, being hired at Progrès du Golfe in 1953, a local regional station of CJBR for the Gaspé Peninsula, beginning a nearly 40 year career in radio. During his time for Golfe Burgess would write over 1,800 articles. Burgess' highly emotional style of reporting, and his emphasis on the well-being of the country's French-speaking workers, was extremely popular among the Québécois community.

Burgess made a name for himself in fighting corruption in Québécois journalism, beginning when the mayor of Rimouski, who was also a used car salesman, tried to pressure Burgess into writing a puff piece on his car dealership with his political connections, with Burgess becoming a local symbol for righteousness, integrity, and justice. Burgess was also a vocal opponent of the Eastern Quebec Development Office, which attempted to shift Quebec towards a service economy, arguing that the effort was harmful to Québécois farmers and foresters. Despite his vocal opposition to the government, and support of Québécois nationalism, Burgess was still an ardent supporter of the Liberals, and was a Federalist. Although Burgess also received criticism for opposing Feminist movements.

Burgess would leave the world of Radio to run for Rimouski's Parliament seat in the 1974 election as a Liberal although he would narrowly lose to Eudore Allard of the Social Credit Party with 13,698 votes to Allard's 15,085. After the 1980 Labour Conflict Burgess became disillusioned in the Liberal party and returned to radio, continuing his work as a radio host until his death.

Burgess died suddenly in August 1983, at the age of 52.

== Legacy ==
In 2009 a foundation would be created in Burgess' name to promote French-speaking journalism. In 2022 the foundation would sponsor a biography of Burgess, titled Sandy Burgess : La voix d’un géant (Sandy Burgess: The voice of a Giant) published in 2022.

Rue Sandy-Burgess in Rimouski was named in honor of Burgess in 2008.
