= Joseph-Gédéon-Horace Bergeron =

Canadian politician (1854–1917)

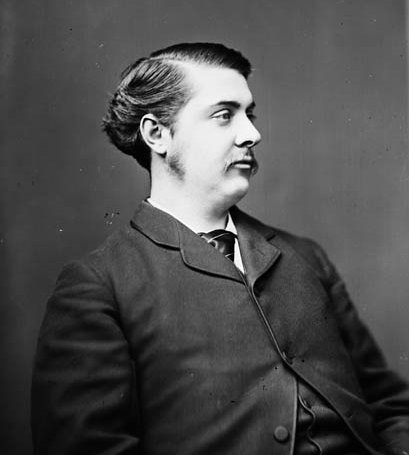

Member of the Canadian Parliament for Beauharnois
- In office 1879–1900
- Preceded by: Michael Cayley
- Succeeded by: George di Madeiros Loy
- In office 1904–1908
- Preceded by: George di Madeiros Loy
- Succeeded by: Louis-Joseph Papineau

Personal details
- Born: October 13, 1854 Rigaud, Canada East
- Died: January 22, 1917 (aged 62)
- Party: Conservative
- Portfolio: Deputy Speaker and Chair of Committees of the Whole of the House of Commons (1891-1896)

Joseph-Gédéon-Horace Bergeron (October 13, 1854 – January 22, 1917) was a Canadian politician.

Born in Rigaud, Canada East, the son of T. R. Bergeron and Leocadie Caroline Delphine Coursol, Bergeron was educated at the Jesuits' College, Montreal and took a commercial course at the Montreal Business College, where he obtained a diploma. In March 1877, he received a B.C.L. from McGill University. He was called to the Quebec Bar in July 1877.

Bergeron was first elected to the House of Commons of Canada for the riding of Beauharnois in January 1879 after the death of the sitting member, Michael Cayley. A Conservative, he was acclaimed at the general elections held in 1882 and re-elected in 1887, 1891, and 1896. He was defeated in 1900 but was re-elected again in 1904 before losing in 1908. From 1891 to 1896, he was the Deputy Speaker and Chairman of Committees of the Whole of the House of Commons.

== Electoral record ==
By-election on Cayley's death, January 9, 1879
Party	Candidate	Votes	%	±%
Conservative	Joseph-Gédéon-Horace Bergeron	776		
Unknown	L. A. Seers	763		
Unknown	J. B. C. St. Amour	28		

1882 Canadian federal election: Beauharnois
Party	Candidate	Votes	%	±%
Conservative	Joseph-Gédéon-Horace Bergeron	acclaimed		

1887 Canadian federal election: Beauharnois
Party	Candidate	Votes	%	±%
Independent Conservative	Joseph-Gédéon-Horace Bergeron	1,432		
Conservative	Philippe Pelletier	1,210		

1891 Canadian federal election: Beauharnois
Party	Candidate	Votes	%	±%
Conservative	Joseph-Gédéon-Horace Bergeron	1,458		
Liberal	L. A. Seers	1,155		

1896 Canadian federal election: Beauharnois
Party	Candidate	Votes	%	±%
Conservative	Joseph-Gédéon-Horace Bergeron	1,582		
Liberal	Joseph-Israël Tarte	1,534		

1900 Canadian federal election: Beauharnois
Party	Candidate	Votes	%	±%
Liberal	George di Madeiros Loy	2,016		
Conservative	Joseph-Gédéon-Horace Bergeron	1,739		

By-election on election being declared void, 26 March 1902
Party	Candidate	Votes	%	±%
Liberal	George di Madeiros Loy	1,822		
Conservative	Joseph-Gédéon-Horace Bergeron	1,663		

1900 Canadian federal election: Beauharnois
Party	Candidate	Votes	%	±%
Liberal	George di Madeiros Loy	2,016		
Conservative	Joseph-Gédéon-Horace Bergeron	1,739		

1904 Canadian federal election: Beauharnois
Party	Candidate	Votes	%	±%
Conservative	Joseph-Gédéon-Horace Bergeron	2,075		
Liberal	George di Madeiros Loy	1,828		

1908 Canadian federal election: Beauharnois
Party	Candidate	Votes	%	±%
Liberal	Louis-Joseph Papineau	1,843		
Conservative	Joseph-Gédéon-Horace Bergeron	1,814		

1911 Canadian federal election: Beauharnois
Party	Candidate	Votes	%	±%
Conservative	Louis-Joseph Papineau	1,876		
Conservative	Joseph-Gédéon-Horace Bergeron	1,849		
