= Minister responsible for La Francophonie (Canada) =

Canadian federal cabinet office

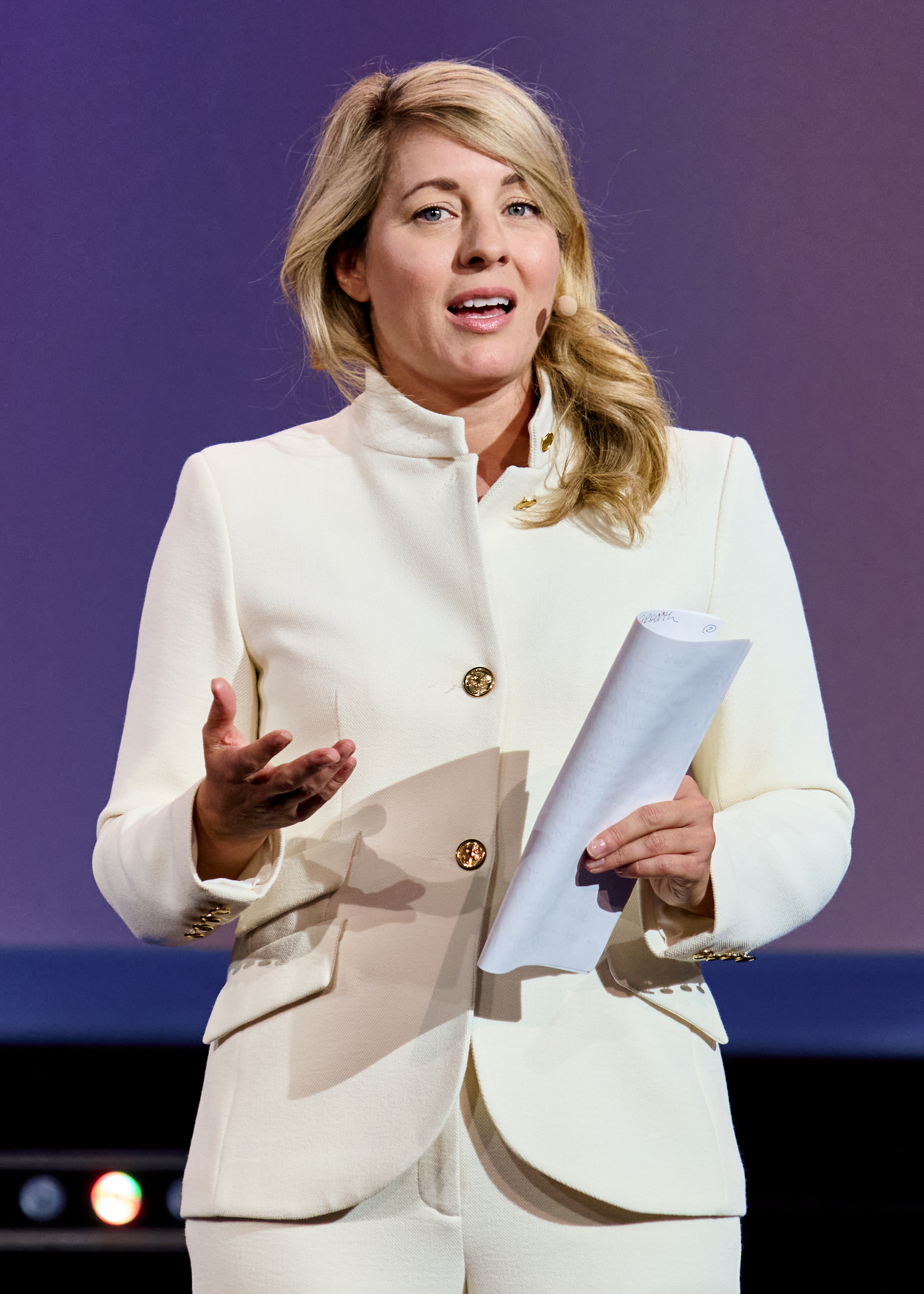
- Incumbent; Mélanie Joly since 18 July 2018
- Department of Global Affairs
- Style: The Honourable
- Member of: Cabinet; Privy Council
- Appointer: Monarch (represented by the governor general) on the advice of the prime minister
- Term length: At His Majesty's pleasure
- Inaugural holder: Jean-Luc Pépin
- Formation: 1983
- Website: www.international.gc.ca/franco/index.aspx?lang=eng

The Minister responsible for La Francophonie is a member of the Canadian Cabinet who handles relations with the Organisation internationale de la Francophonie, an international community of francophone nations considered the French equivalent of the Commonwealth of Nations.

== Role ==
The Minister responsible for the Francophonie is one of three ministers currently associated with the department Global Affairs Canada. A similar position exists at the provincial level in the Government of Quebec.

It is traditional that the minister be from Quebec or from a Francophone community outside Quebec. It is tacitly understood that the minister should speak French fluently.

== List of ministers ==
- Jean-Luc Pépin (1983–1984)
- Jean Chrétien (1984)
- Monique Vézina (1984–1986)
- Monique Landry (1986–1993)
- Monique Vézina (1993) (second time)
- André Ouellet (1993–1996)
- Pierre Pettigrew (1996)
- Don Boudria (1996–1997)
- Diane Marleau (1997–1999)
- Ronald Duhamel* (1999–2002)
- Denis Paradis* (2002–2003)
- Denis Coderre (2003–2004)
- Jacques Saada (2004–2006)
- Josée Verner (2006–2007)
- Maxime Bernier (2007–2008)
- Josée Verner (2008–2011); second time
- Bernard Valcourt (2011–2013)
- Steven Blaney (2013)
- Christian Paradis (2013–2015)
- Marie-Claude Bibeau (2015–2018)
- Mélanie Joly (2018–present)

(*)Secretary of State responsible for La Francophonie and not a member of Cabinet.
