= Beauharnois (federal electoral district) =

Former federal electoral district in Quebec, Canada

Coordinates: 45.249°N 73.988°W

Quebec electoral district

Defunct federal electoral district
- Legislature: House of Commons
- District created: 1947
- District abolished: 1952
- First contested: 1949
- Last contested: 1949

Beauharnois (French pronunciation: [boaʁnwa]; also known as Beauharnois—Salaberry) was a federal electoral district in Quebec, Canada, that was represented in the House of Commons of Canada from 1867 to 1935, from 1949 to 1953, and from 1968 to 1972.

Beauharnois riding was created in the British North America Act 1867. It was merged into Beauharnois—Laprairie riding in 1933.

In 1947, "Beauharnois" riding was re-created from Beauharnois—Laprairie and Châteauguay—Huntingdon.

In 1952, it became "Beauharnois—Salaberry". It reverted to "Beauharnois" from 1966 to 1971, and from 1976 to 1977. The rest of time it was known as "Beauharnois—Salaberry" as it is known as today.

- See Beauharnois—Salaberry for information on this riding after 1952.

== Description ==
Beauharnois initially consisted of the area bounded on the northeast and the southeast by the County of Châteauguay, on the southwest by the southwestern limits of the Seigniory of Beauharnois, on the northwest by the Châteauguay St. Lawrence boundary, including all islands nearest to and wholly or in part opposite the said county. It comprised the Parishes of Saint Clément, Saint Louis de Gonzague, Saint Stanislas de Kostka, Ste. Cecile and Saint Timothée.

In 1924, it was redefined to consisted of the County of Beauharnois, including the City of Valleyfield.

It was abolished in 1933 and redistributed into Beauharnois—Laprairie and Châteauguay—Huntingdon.

In 1947, it was recreated and defined to consist of the county of Beauharnois, the city of Salaberry-de-Valleyfield, the towns of Maple Grove and Beauharnois, the municipality of St. Joachim-de-Châteauguay, the towns of Châteauguay and De Léry, and the municipality of St. Anicet and Ste. Barbe.

It was renamed Beauharnois—Salaberry in 1952.

== Members of Parliament ==
This riding has elected the following members of Parliament:

Parliament	Years	Member	Party
Beauharnois
1st	1867–1872	Michael Cayley	Conservative
2nd	1872–1874	Ulysse-Janvier Robillard	Independent Conservative
3rd	1874–1878	Ulysse-Janvier Robillard	Independent Conservative
4th	1878–1878	Michael Cayley	Conservative
4th	1879–1882	Joseph-Gédéon-Horace Bergeron	Conservative
5th	1882–1887	Joseph-Gédéon-Horace Bergeron	Conservative
6th	1887–1891	Joseph-Gédéon-Horace Bergeron	Independent Conservative
7th	1891–1896	Joseph-Gédéon-Horace Bergeron	Conservative
8th	1896–1900	Joseph-Gédéon-Horace Bergeron	Conservative
9th	1900–1902	George di Madeiros Loy	Liberal
9th	1902–1904	George di Madeiros Loy	Liberal
10th	1904–1908	Joseph-Gédéon-Horace Bergeron	Conservative
11th	1908–1911	Louis-Joseph Papineau	Liberal
12th	1911–1917	Louis-Joseph Papineau	Conservative
13th	1917–1921	Louis-Joseph Papineau	Opposition (Laurier Liberals)
14th	1921–1925	Louis-Joseph Papineau	Liberal
15th	1925–1926	Maxime Raymond	Liberal
16th	1926–1930	Maxime Raymond	Liberal
17th	1930–1935	Maxime Raymond	Liberal
Riding dissolved into Beauharnois—Laprairie
Riding re-created from Beauharnois—Laprairie and Châteauguay—Huntingdon
21st	1949–1953	Robert Cauchon	Liberal
Riding renamed Beauharnois—Salaberry

== Election results ==
=== Beauharnois, 1867–1935 ===
1867 Canadian federal election
Party	Candidate	Votes
Conservative	Michael Cayley	724
Unknown	Paul Denis	691
Source: Canadian Elections Database

1872 Canadian federal election
Party	Candidate	Votes	%	±%
Independent Conservative	Ulysse-Janvier Robillard	854		
Conservative	Michael Cayley	764		
Source: Canadian Elections Database

1874 Canadian federal election
Party	Candidate	Votes	%	±%
Independent Conservative	Ulysse-Janvier Robillard	711		
Unknown	M. Branchaud	346		
Conservative	Désiré Girouard	314		
Source: Canadian Elections Database

1878 Canadian federal election
Party	Candidate	Votes	%	±%
Conservative	Michael Cayley	879		
Unknown	M. F. W. Valois	107		
Source: Canadian Elections Database

By-election on Cayley's death, January 9, 1879
Party	Candidate	Votes	%	±%
Conservative	Joseph-Gédéon-Horace Bergeron	776		
Unknown	L. A. Seers	763		
Unknown	J. B. C. St. Amour	28		

1882 Canadian federal election
Party	Candidate	Votes	%	±%
Conservative	Joseph-Gédéon-Horace Bergeron	acclaimed		

1887 Canadian federal election
Party	Candidate	Votes	%	±%
Independent Conservative	Joseph-Gédéon-Horace Bergeron	1,432		
Conservative	Philippe Pelletier	1,210		

1891 Canadian federal election
Party	Candidate	Votes	%	±%
Conservative	Joseph-Gédéon-Horace Bergeron	1,458		
Liberal	L. A. Seers	1,155		

1896 Canadian federal election
Party	Candidate	Votes	%	±%
Conservative	Joseph-Gédéon-Horace Bergeron	1,582		
Liberal	Joseph-Israël Tarte	1,534		

1900 Canadian federal election
Party	Candidate	Votes	%	±%
Liberal	George di Madeiros Loy	2,016		
Conservative	Joseph-Gédéon-Horace Bergeron	1,739		

By-election on election being declared void, 26 March 1902
Party	Candidate	Votes	%	±%
Liberal	George di Madeiros Loy	1,822		
Conservative	Joseph-Gédéon-Horace Bergeron	1,663		

1900 Canadian federal election
Party	Candidate	Votes	%	±%
Liberal	George di Madeiros Loy	2,016		
Conservative	Joseph-Gédéon-Horace Bergeron	1,739		

1904 Canadian federal election
Party	Candidate	Votes	%	±%
Conservative	Joseph-Gédéon-Horace Bergeron	2,075		
Liberal	George di Madeiros Loy	1,828		

1908 Canadian federal election
Party	Candidate	Votes	%	±%
Liberal	Louis-Joseph Papineau	1,843		
Conservative	Joseph-Gédéon-Horace Bergeron	1,814		

1911 Canadian federal election
Party	Candidate	Votes	%	±%
Conservative	Louis-Joseph Papineau	1,876		
Conservative	Joseph-Gédéon-Horace Bergeron	1,849		

1917 Canadian federal election
Party	Candidate	Votes	%	±%
Opposition	Louis-Joseph Papineau	acclaimed		

1921 Canadian federal election
Party	Candidate	Votes	%	±%
Liberal	Louis-Joseph Papineau	5,147		
Conservative	Rodolphe Monty	3,272		

1925 Canadian federal election
Party	Candidate	Votes	%	±%
Liberal	Maxime Raymond	4,724		
Conservative	Stanislas Wilfrid Laroche	3,223		

1926 Canadian federal election
Party	Candidate	Votes	%	±%
Liberal	Maxime Raymond	4,843		
Conservative	Tancrède Fortin	2,565		
Liberal	Achille Bergevin	374		

1930 Canadian federal election
Party	Candidate	Votes	%	±%
Liberal	Maxime Raymond	5,714		
Conservative	Joseph-Hormisdas Lebeuf	3,989		
Source: Canadian Elections Database

=== Beauharnois, 1949–1953 ===
1949 Canadian federal election
Party	Candidate	Votes	%	±%
Liberal	Robert Cauchon	11,631		
Progressive Conservative	Joseph Primeau	4,547		
Union des électeurs	Gilbert Rondeau	397		

== See also ==
- List of Canadian electoral districts
- Historical federal electoral districts of Canada
