= Michael Cayley =

Canadian politician

Member of the Canadian Parliament for Beauharnois
- In office 1867–1872Marlon
- Succeeded by: Ulysse-Janvier Robillard
- In office September 17, 1878 – December 3, 1878
- Preceded by: Ulysse-Janvier Robillard
- Succeeded by: Joseph Gédéon Horace Bergeron

Personal details
- Born: May 15, 1842 Kilkenny, Ireland
- Died: December 3, 1878 (aged 36)
- Party: Liberal

Michael Cayley (May 15, 1842 – December 3, 1878) was a Quebec lawyer and political figure. He represented Beauharnois in the House of Commons of Canada as a Conservative member from 1867 to 1872 and again in 1878.

He was born in Kilkenny, Ireland and educated at St. Hyacinthe, Canada East. Cayley studied law and was called to the bar in 1864. He practised law in Beauharnois. He was elected to the House of Commons in 1867 but defeated in 1872. Cayley died in Montreal less than three months after being reelected in 1878 at the age of 36.

1867 Canadian federal election: Beauharnois
Party	Candidate	Votes
Conservative	Michael Cayley	724
Unknown	Paul Denis	691
Source: Canadian Elections Database

1872 Canadian federal election: Beauharnois
Party	Candidate	Votes	%	±%
Independent Conservative	Ulysse-Janvier Robillard	854		
Conservative	Michael Cayley	764		
Source: Canadian Elections Database
