= Maxime Raymond =

Canadian politician (1883–1961)

Maxime Raymond K.C.
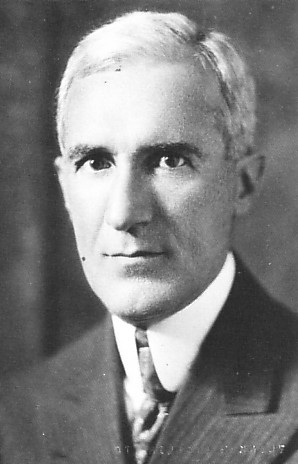

Member of the Canadian Parliament for Beauharnois
- In office 29 October 1925 – 13 October 1935

Member of the Canadian Parliament for Beauharnois—Laprairie
- In office 14 October 1935 – 26 June 1949

Personal details
- Born: 25 December 1883 Saint-Stanislas-de-Kostka, Quebec, Canada
- Died: 13 July 1961 (aged 77)
- Party: Liberal, Bloc populaire
- Profession: Lawyer

Maxime Raymond (25 December 1883 – 13 July 1961) was a Canadian politician, businessman and lawyer in Quebec.

Raymond was born in Saint-Stanislas-de-Kostka, Quebec. In the 1925 Canadian federal election he ran as a Liberal candidate in the district of Beauharnois, and won. He was re-elected in 1926 and 1930. In 1935 and 1940 he was elected in the district of Beauharnois—Laprairie. Raymond was one of three Liberal MPs who broke with the party to oppose Canada's entry into the Second World War in 1939, arguing that Canada should restrict its efforts to home defence and not send its troops abroad.

He formally left the Liberals over the issue of conscription and became the Leader of the Bloc populaire canadien on 10 February 1943. Raymond was re-elected in 1945 as a Bloc populaire MP but did not run for re-election in 1949.

== Electoral record ==
1925 Canadian federal election: Beauharnois
Party	Candidate	Votes	%	±%
Liberal	Maxime Raymond	4,724		
Conservative	Stanislas Wilfrid Laroche	3,223		

1926 Canadian federal election: Beauharnois
Party	Candidate	Votes	%	±%
Liberal	Maxime Raymond	4,843		
Conservative	Tancrède Fortin	2,565		
Liberal	Achille Bergevin	374		

1930 Canadian federal election: Beauharnois
Party	Candidate	Votes	%	±%
Liberal	Maxime Raymond	5,714		
Conservative	Joseph-Hormisdas Lebeuf	3,989		
Source: Canadian Elections Database

1935 Canadian federal election
Party	Candidate	Votes	%	±%
Liberal	Maxime Raymond	10,052		
Conservative	Noël Beausoleil	3,954		

1940 Canadian federal election
Party	Candidate	Votes	%	±%
Liberal	Maxime Raymond	11,244		
National Government	Hormisdas Roy	3,471		

1945 Canadian federal election
Party	Candidate	Votes	%	±%
Bloc populaire	Maxime Raymond	10,716		
Liberal	Robert Cauchon	10,378		
Progressive Conservative	Arthur W. Sullivan	1,779		

== Footnotes ==
Parliament of Canada
Preceded by Louis-Joseph Papineau (Liberal)	MP for Beauharnois—Laprairie; 1925–1949	Succeeded by Robert Cauchon (Liberal)
