= Gérard Légaré =

Canadian politician

Member of Parliament for Rimouski
- In office August 1953 – March 1958
- Preceded by: Joseph Hervé Rousseau
- Succeeded by: Émilien Morissette
- In office June 1962 – April 1963
- Preceded by: Émilien Morissette
- Succeeded by: Gérard Ouellet

Personal details
- Born: 11 July 1908 Chicoutimi, Quebec, Canada
- Died: 1 November 1997 (aged 89) Drummondville, Quebec, Canada
- Party: Liberal
- Profession: Editor, journalist, printer, publisher

Gérard Légaré (11 July 1908 – 1 November 1997) was a Liberal party member of the House of Commons of Canada. He was an editor, journalist, printer and publisher by career. He was born in Chicoutimi, Quebec.

He was first elected at the Rimouski riding in the 1953 general election, then re-elected there for a second term in the 1957 election. In the 1958 election he was defeated by Émilien Morissette of the Progressive Conservative party, but won back the riding in the 1962 election.

The 25th Canadian Parliament was Légaré's last term in federal office. During the 1963 election campaign, Social Credit candidate Gérard Ouellet was reported to be winning the rural areas of Rimouski. New Democratic Party candidate Raymond D'Auteuil attracted younger urban voters whom Liberal campaigners admittedly ignored. After a judicial recount of ballots, Ouellet won Rimouski with 140 more votes than Légaré. By that June, Légaré was hired to assist Jean-Paul Deschatelets, the Minister of Public Works in Lester B. Pearson's new government.

Légaré joined the Immigration Appeal Board in 1967, becoming its vice-chair in March 1976. He was also an editorial assistant for the federal Centennial Commission.
