= Rodolphe Monty =

Canadian politician

The Honourable Rodolphe Monty PC KC
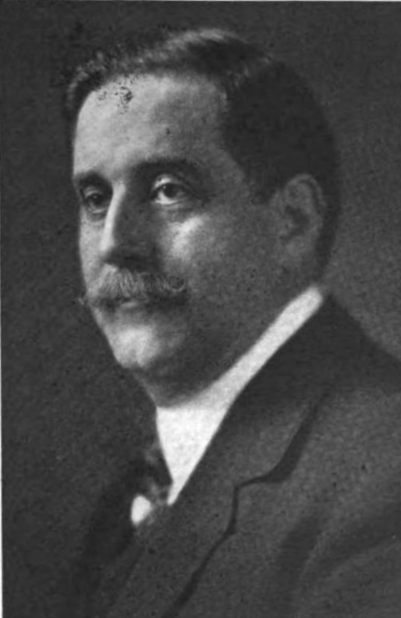

Secretary of State for Canada
- In office September 21, 1921 – December 28, 1921
- Preceded by: Henry Lumley Drayton
- Succeeded by: Arthur Bliss Copp

Personal details
- Born: November 30, 1874 Montreal, Quebec, Canada
- Died: December 1, 1928 (aged 54) St. Hyacinthe, Quebec, Canada
- Party: Conservative

Rodolphe Monty PC KC (November 30, 1874 – December 1, 1928) was a Canadian politician.

== Early life ==
Born in Montreal, Quebec, Monty was educated in law at Université Laval and McGill University. He was called to the Bar of Quebec in 1897 and was created a King's Counsel in 1909.

== Political career ==
In September 1921, Monty was appointed Secretary of State of Canada in the cabinet of Arthur Meighen. A Conservative, he was defeated in the 1921 federal election in the riding of Beauharnois. He was also defeated in the riding of Laurier—Outremont in the 1925 election.

== Electoral history ==
1925 Canadian federal election: Laurier—Outremont
Party	Candidate	Votes
Liberal	Joseph-Alexandre Mercier	12,889
Conservative	Rodolphe Monty	10,105

1921 Canadian federal election: Beauharnois
Party	Candidate	Votes
Liberal	Louis-Joseph Papineau	5,147
Conservative	Rodolphe Monty	3,272
