= Beauharnois—Laprairie =

Former federal electoral district in Quebec, Canada

Quebec electoral district

Defunct federal electoral district
- Legislature: House of Commons
- District created: 1933
- District abolished: 1947
- First contested: 1935
- Last contested: 1945

Beauharnois—Laprairie (French pronunciation: [boaʁnwa lapʁɛʁi]) was a federal electoral district in Quebec, Canada, that was represented in the House of Commons of Canada from 1935 to 1949.

This riding was created in 1933 from Beauharnois and Laprairie—Napierville ridings. It was abolished in 1947 when it was redistributed into Beauharnois, Châteauguay—Huntingdon—Laprairie and Saint-Jean—Iberville—Napierville ridings.

It consisted of the county of Beauharnois (excluding the municipality of St-Etienne), the county of Laprairie, the municipalities of Ste-Philomène, St-Joachim and the towns of De Léry and of Châteauguay, and the municipality of Ste-Barbe.

== Members of Parliament ==
This riding elected the following members of Parliament:

Parliament	Years	Member	Party
Beauharnois—Laprairie; Riding created from Beauharnois and Laprairie—Napierville
18th	1935–1940	Maxime Raymond	Liberal
19th	1940–1943	Maxime Raymond	Liberal
19th	1943–1945	Maxime Raymond	Bloc populaire
20th	1945–1949	Maxime Raymond	Bloc populaire
Riding dissolved into Beauharnois, Châteauguay—Huntingdon—Laprairie and Saint-Jean—Iberville—Napierville

== Electoral history ==
1935 Canadian federal election
Party	Candidate	Votes	%	±%
Liberal	Maxime Raymond	10,052		
Conservative	Noël Beausoleil	3,954		

1940 Canadian federal election
Party	Candidate	Votes	%	±%
Liberal	Maxime Raymond	11,244		
National Government	Hormisdas Roy	3,471		

1945 Canadian federal election
Party	Candidate	Votes	%	±%
Bloc populaire	Maxime Raymond	10,716		
Liberal	Robert Cauchon	10,378		
Progressive Conservative	Arthur W. Sullivan	1,779		

== See also ==
- List of Canadian electoral districts
- Historical federal electoral districts of Canada
