= Jean Auguste Ross =

Canadian politician

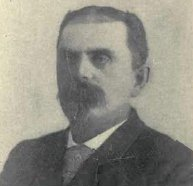

Member of the Canadian Parliament for Rimouski
- In office 1897–1911
- Preceded by: Jean-Baptiste Romuald Fiset
- Succeeded by: Herménégilde Boulay

Personal details
- Born: September 6, 1851 Rimouski, Canada East
- Died: February 3, 1920 (aged 68)
- Party: Liberal

Jean Auguste Ross (September 6, 1851 – February 3, 1920) was a Canadian physician and politician.

== Life and career ==
Born in Rimouski, Canada East, the son of John Ross and Caroline Talbot, Ross was educated at Ste. Anne and Rimouski Seminaries. He received his medical education from Université Laval and then started practicing medicine in Rimouski. He was also Coroner for the District of Rimouski and a Quarantine Officer for the port. He was first elected to the House of Commons of Canada for the electoral district of Rimouski in an 1897 by-election. A Liberal, he was re-elected in 1900, 1904, and 1908. He was defeated in 1911.
