= Suzanne Tremblay =

Canadian politician (1937–2020)

Opposition House Leader
- In office March 17, 1997 – April 25, 1997
- Leader: Gilles Duceppe
- Preceded by: Gilles Duceppe
- Succeeded by: Randy White

Member of the Canadian Parliament for Rimouski-Neigette-et-La Mitis (Rimouski—Mitis 1997-2000) (Rimouski—Témiscouata 1993-1997)
- In office October 25, 1993 – June 28, 2004
- Preceded by: Monique Vézina
- Succeeded by: Riding dissolved

Personal details
- Born: January 24, 1937 Montreal, Quebec
- Died: September 26, 2020 (aged 83) Rimouski, Quebec
- Party: Bloc Québécois

Suzanne Tremblay (French pronunciation: [syzan tʁɑ̃blɛ]; January 24, 1937 – September 26, 2020) was a Canadian politician from Quebec who served as a Bloc Québécois member of the House of Commons of Canada from 1993 to 2004.

== Early life ==
Born in Montreal, Tremblay received a Queen Elizabeth II Scholarship to attend Tufts University in the United States, where she earned a Master's degree in pre-school education. She then completed a certificate in educational studies at the Université de Lyon and a certificate in child care studies at the University of London.

== Political career ==
Tremblay was first elected to the House of Commons of Canada in the 1993 federal election for the riding of Rimouski—Témiscouata. She was re-elected in the 1997 election for the riding of Rimouski-Mitis and in the 2000 election for Rimouski-Neigette-et-La Mitis. She announced her intention not to run again in the 2004 federal election.

She was occasionally a controversial figure, once pointing out that Quebec Premier Jean Charest's first name was really "John" in an attempt to discredit him as a representative of the true Quebec; the Bloc Québécois leader Gilles Duceppe distanced himself from this comment. Tremblay also made similar comments attacking Radio-Canada journalist Joyce Napier for not having a francophone name, and pop singer Céline Dion for purportedly turning her back on her Québécoise identity in her pursuit of pop stardom.

Following Tremblay's announcement of her retirement from the House of Commons, Louise Thibault, a municipal councillor in Le Bic, became the Bloc Québécois candidate in the new riding of Rimouski-Neigette—Témiscouata—Les Basques, and won the 2004 election. Tremblay ran in the resulting by-election to fill Thibault's municipal council seat, running primarily on a campaign of opposing the then-proposed amalgamation of Le Bic with Rimouski. She lost narrowly to Pierre Garon, a local farmer and trucker who had not previously been active in politics.

== Death ==
Tremblay died on September 26, 2020, from cancer.

== Electoral record ==
2000 Canadian federal election
Party	Candidate	Votes
Bloc Québécois	Suzanne Tremblay	19,759
Liberal	Réal Marmen	9,795
Alliance	Gerard Gosselin	1,280
Progressive Conservative	Réal Blais	1,150
Natural Law	Lyse Beauchemin	673
New Democratic	René Lemieux	525

1997 Canadian federal election: Rimouski—Mitis
Party	Candidate	Votes	%	±%	Expenditures
Bloc Québécois	Suzanne Tremblay	17,282	47.00		$53,089
Liberal	Réal Marmen	11,112	30.22	–	$47,800
Progressive Conservative	Jean Roy	7,901	21.49		$32,225
New Democratic	Elizabeth Clark	479	1.30		$0
Total valid votes		36,774	100.00		
Total rejected ballots		1,211			
Turnout		37,985	68.24		
Electors on the lists		55,665			
Sources: Official Results, Elections Canada and Financial Returns, Elections Canada.

1993 Canadian federal election
Party	Candidate	Votes
Bloc Québécois	Suzanne Tremblay	23,118
Liberal	André Reid	9,454
Progressive Conservative	Jean Morin	4,622
Independent	François-Michel Denis	598
Natural Law	Gilles Roussel	400
New Democratic	Alex En Hwa Ng	335
