= Bloc populaire =

Bloc populaire canadien
- Leader: André Laurendeau
- Founded: September 8, 1942
- Dissolved: July 6, 1947
- Ideology: Anti-conscriptionism; Quebec nationalism

The Bloc populaire canadien (French pronunciation: [blɔk pɔpylɛʁ kanadjɛ̃], lit. 'Canadian Popular Bloc'), often shortened to the Bloc populaire or the Bloc, was a political party in the Canadian province of Quebec from 1942 to 1947. It was founded on September 8, 1942, by opponents of conscription during the Second World War. The party ran candidates at both federal and provincial levels. In the 1945 federal election, the party made a minor breakthrough by winning two seats in the House of Commons.

== Origin ==
In early 1942, Liguori Lacombe formed the anti-conscriptionist Parti canadien which finished strongly in two February by-elections.

In the April 27, 1942 national plebiscite on conscription held in Canada, a little more than 70% of Quebec voters refused to free the federal government from its promise to avoid a general mobilization, while about 80 per cent of the citizens of the rest of Canada accepted it. (see also Second Conscription Crisis)

The party was inspired by the nationalist ideas of Henri Bourassa and supported by Montreal mayor Camillien Houde. Jean Drapeau and Pierre Elliot Trudeau were members in their youth.

In addition to opposing conscription, the party aimed to defend provincial autonomy and the rights of French-Canadians.

== Provincial level ==
At the provincial level, it was led by André Laurendeau and won four seats in the 1944 Quebec general election, but soon lost popularity. Laurendeau resigned in July 1947, and the party dissolved and did not participate in the 1948 general election.

== Federal level ==
At the federal level it was led by Maxime Raymond, who had been Member of Parliament (MP) from the province of Quebec since the 1925 federal election. He and two of his Liberal colleagues (Édouard Lacroix and Pierre Gauthier) crossed the floor to sit as Bloc populaire canadien MPs.

The Bloc populaire won a federal by-election in 1943.

The Bloc populaire's entry into provincial politics antagonized Quebec Premier Maurice Duplessis, leader of the Union Nationale, who henceforth transferred his party's federal support to the "Independent Group" of anti-conscription MPs led by Frédéric Dorion in the 1945 federal election.

In the 1945 federal election, the Bloc nominated 35 candidates. All of them except two ran in Quebec-based ridings. (Lionel Campeau, ran in the district of Nipissing in Northern Ontario and Léandre Maisonneuve ran in the Eastern Ontario riding of Prescott. Only two candidates were elected as Members of Parliament: Maxime Raymond and René Hamel. Though former Montreal mayor Camillien Houde was officially listed as an independent candidate, he was reported to be the Bloc populaire's co-leader in the 1945 election.

In addition to the Bloc populaire, there was also an "Independent Group" of five anti-conscription MPs led by Frédéric Dorion which included Liguori Lacombe, Wilfrid Lacroix, Sasseville Roy and Emmanuel D'Anjou (D'Anjou had joined the Bloc in June 1944 but had left to join Dorion's group by the time of the 1945 election). Additionally, Arthur Cardin quit Mackenzie King's cabinet in May 1942 over the conscription issue to sit as an anti-conscription independent MP.

== Decline ==
The Second World War ended in 1945, and by the late 1940s the party's concerns had largely become a non-issue. Many insiders abandoned the party. The Bloc populaire canadien contested neither the 1948 provincial election nor the 1949 federal election, and soon ceased to exist.

== Publications ==
The party published a modest and short-lived weekly newspaper, Le Bloc, in 1944 and 1945, with a circulation of about 15,000 copies. The newspaper was under the responsibility of Victor Trépanier in early 1944 and of Léopold Richer in 1944–1945. The party also published a series of ten brochures reproducing the texts of radio speeches by its leaders.

== Quebec provincial election results ==
General election	# of candidates	# of seats won	% of popular vote
1944	80	4	14.40%

== Members of the Legislative Assembly of Quebec ==
MLA	District	Region	Years of service	Background
Ovila Bergeron	Stanstead	Eastern Townships	1944–1948 (Note: Bergeron did not run for re-election in 1948.)	Manager of a Credit Union
Édouard Lacroix	Beauce	Chaudière-Appalaches	1944–1945 (Note: Lacroix never took his seat at the Legislative Assembly. He resigned on May 14, 1945 and did not run for re-election.)	Lumber Merchant & Liberal MP
André Laurendeau	Montréal-Laurier	Montreal East	1944–1948 (Note: Laurendeau sat as an independent member by July 6, 1947. He did not run for re-election in 1948.)	Journalist
Albert Lemieux	Beauharnois	Montérégie	1944–1948 (Note: Lemieux did not run for re-election in 1948.)	Lawyer

== Members of the Canadian House of Commons ==
MP	District	Region	Years of service	Background
Joseph Armand Choquette	Stanstead	Eastern Townships	1943–1945 (Note: Choquette lost re-election in 1945.)	Farmer
Joseph-Émile-Stanislas-Émmanuel D'Anjou	Rimouski	Bas-Saint-Laurent	1917-1924; 1940–1945 (Note: D'Anjou left the Liberals and joined the Bloc on June 22, 1944. He subsequently left the Bloc to join Frédéric Dorion's group of Independent anti-conscription MPs. He ran as an independent in the 1945 federal election and was defeated.)	Insurance Broker & Liberal MP
Pierre Gauthier	Portneuf	Québec	1936–1958 (Note: Gauthier left the Liberals and joined the Bloc Populaire on February 18, 1943. He became Liberal again on June 11, 1945 and was re-elected as a candidate of that party that same year.)	Physician & Liberal MP
René Hamel	Saint-Maurice—Laflèche	Mauricie	1945–1949 (Note: Hamel sat as an independent member by July 27, 1949. He lost re-election in 1949.)	Lawyer
Édouard Lacroix	Beauce	Chaudière-Appalaches	1925–1945 (Note: Lacroix left the Liberals and joined the Bloc Populaire on February 18, 1943. He resigned his seat on July 11, 1944 to switch to provincial politics.)	Lumber Merchant & Liberal MP
Maxime Raymond	Beauharnois—Laprairie	Montérégie	1925–1949 (Note: Raymond left the Liberals and joined the Bloc Populaire on February 10, 1943. He did not run for re-election in 1949.)	Lawyer & Liberal MP

== Notable defeated candidate ==
Candidate	District	Region	Year	Background
Jean Drapeau	Outremont; Montréal-Jeanne-Mance	Montreal West; Montreal East	1942 (federal); 1944 (provincial)	Lawyer
Roger Duhamel	St. James	Montreal	1945 (federal)	author

== Prominent insider ==
Member	Region	Years	Background
Pierre Elliott Trudeau	Montreal	1942–1945	Student

== See also ==
- Conscription Crisis of 1944
- Politics of Quebec
- List of Quebec general elections
- National Assembly of Quebec
- Timeline of Quebec history
