= CBRX-FM =

Radio station in Rimouski, Quebec, Canada

- Rimouski, Quebec; Canada
- Broadcast area: Eastern Quebec
- Frequency: 101.5 MHz

Programming
- Format: Public Music
- Network: Ici Musique

Ownership
- Owner: Canadian Broadcasting Corporation

History
- First air date: 1947
- Former call signs: CJBR (1947–1990s)
- Call sign meaning: Canadian Broadcasting Corporation Rimouski X

Technical information
- Class: C
- ERP: 100 watts horizontal polarization only
- HAAT: 319 metres (1,047 ft)

Links
- Website: ICI Musique

CBRX-FM is a Canadian radio station which broadcasts SRC's Ici Musique network at 101.5 FM in Rimouski, Quebec.

The station launched as CJBR in 1947 and changed to its current callsign in the 1990s after receiving CRTC approval to broadcast at 101.5 MHz.

== Transmitters ==
Rebroadcasters of CBRX-FM
City of licence	Identifier	Frequency	Power	Class	RECNet	CRTC Decision	Notes
Matane	CBRX-FM-1	107.5 FM	31,700 watts	C1	Query	2002-122	48°49′51.96″N 67°22′5.16″W
Rivière-du-Loup	CBRX-FM-3	90.7 FM	100,000 watts	C	Query	2002-122	47°34′36.84″N 69°22′58.08″W
Sept-Îles	CBRX-FM-2	96.1 FM	84,800 watts	C1	Query	2002-122	50°8′56.04″N 66°28′9.12″W

== See also ==
- CJBR-FM
