= Émilien Morissette =

Canadian politician

Member of Parliament for Rimouski
- In office March 1958 – June 1962
- Preceded by: Gérard Légaré
- Succeeded by: Gérard Légaré

Personal details
- Born: 16 March 1927 Mont-Joli, Quebec, Canada
- Party: Progressive Conservative
- Profession: economist

Émilien Morissette (born 16 March 1927) was a Progressive Conservative party member of the House of Commons of Canada. He was an economist by career.

He was first elected at the Rimouski riding in the 1958 general election, defeating Liberal party incumbent Gérard Légaré. After serving his only term, the 24th Canadian Parliament, Légaré won Rimouski back from Morissette in the 1962 general election.
