= Louis Adolphe Billy =

Canadian politician and lawyer

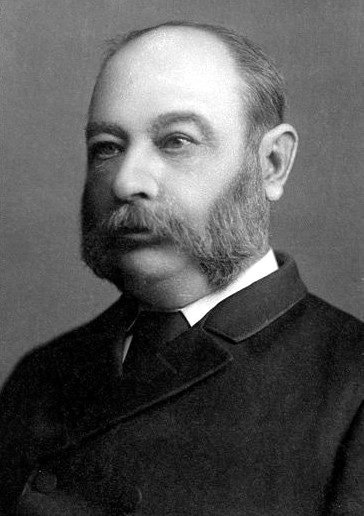

Member of the Canadian Parliament for Rimouski
- In office 1882–1887
- Preceded by: Jean-Baptiste Romuald Fiset
- Succeeded by: Jean-Baptiste Romuald Fiset

Personal details
- Born: October 13, 1834 Gentilly, Lower Canada
- Died: March 20, 1907 (aged 72)
- Party: Conservative Party
- Occupation: lawyer

Louis Adolphe Billy (October 13, 1834 in Gentilly, Lower Canada – March 20, 1907) was a Quebec born politician and lawyer. He was elected to the House of Commons of Canada in 1882 as a Member of the Conservative Party to represent the riding of Rimouski.
