= George Sylvain =

Canadian politician

George Sylvain (August 28, 1819 – February 25, 1891) was a Quebec businessman and political figure. He represented Rimouski in the 1st Canadian Parliament as a Conservative member.

He was born Michel-George Sylvain in Saint-Vallier, Lower Canada in 1819. He entered the forestry business working for the William Price Company at Montmagny and was later put in charge of a new operation at Le Bic. He also managed sawmills for the company along the lower Saint Lawrence. Sylvain served as lieutenant in the local militia and postmaster. He was mayor of Le Bic from 1855 to 1874 and from 1875 to 1876. He also served as Vice-Consul in the region for Norway and Sweden. In 1861, Sylvain was elected to the Legislative Assembly of the Province of Canada for Rimouski; he was reelected in 1863 and again after Confederation. In 1887, he was named Crown Lands agent and served in that post until his death at Rimouski in 1891.

Parliament of Canada
| Preceded by None | Member of Parliament from Rimouski; 1867–1872 | Succeeded by Jean-Baptiste Romuald Fiset |
