= Herménégilde Boulay =

Canadian politician (1861–1942)

Member of the Canadian Parliament for Rimouski
- In office 1911–1917
- Preceded by: Jean Auguste Ross
- Succeeded by: Joseph-Émile-Stanislas-Émmanuel D'Anjou

Personal details
- Born: March 20, 1861 St. Donat, Canada East
- Died: May 18, 1942 (aged 81)
- Party: Conservative Party (1908–1917); Unionist (1917–1921); Conservative Party
- Occupation: farmer manufacturer merchant trader

Herménégilde Boulay (March 20, 1861 – May 18, 1942) was a Canadian politician, farmer, manufacturer, merchant and trader. He was elected to the House of Commons of Canada as a Member of the historical Conservative Party in 1911 to represent the riding of Rimouski. He was defeated in the election of 1908, 1917, 1921 and 1930. The elections of 1917 and 1921 he contested in Matane.

Born in St. Donat, Canada West, Boulay served as mayor of Sayabec, Quebec, before entering federal politics.
