= Joseph Rousseau =

Canadian politician

Member of Parliament for Rimouski
- In office October 1950 – August 1953
- Preceded by: Gleason Belzile
- Succeeded by: Gérard Légaré

Personal details
- Born: Joseph Hervé Rousseau; 22 October 1877 Trois-Pistoles, Quebec
- Died: 5 June 1964 (aged 86)
- Party: Independent Liberal
- Spouse(s): Belanger m. 8 May 1905; Yvonne Langis m. unknown
- Profession: notary

Joseph Hervé Rousseau (22 October 1877 – 5 June 1964) was an Independent Liberal member of the House of Commons of Canada. He was born in Trois-Pistoles, Quebec and became a notary by career.

He was educated at Ste-Anne-de-la-Pocatière College, then at Université Laval where he received his Bachelor of Civil Law degree. For twelve years he was president of the Trois-Pistoles school commission, and once unsuccessfully campaigned for a seat in the Legislative Assembly of Quebec.

Rousseau was first elected to Parliament at the Rimouski riding in a by-election on 16 October 1950. After completing his term in the 21st Canadian Parliament he was defeated in the 1953 election by Gérard Légaré, the official Liberal party candidate on that occasion.
