= Jean-Baptiste Romuald Fiset =

Canadian politician

The Hon. Jean-Baptiste Romuald Fiset
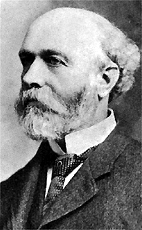

Member of the Canadian Parliament for Rimouski
- In office 1872–1882
- Preceded by: George Sylvain
- Succeeded by: Louis Adolphe Billy
- In office 1887–1891
- Preceded by: Louis Adolphe Billy
- Succeeded by: Adolphe-Philippe Caron
- In office 1896–1897
- Preceded by: Adolphe-Philippe Caron
- Succeeded by: Jean Auguste Ross

Senator for Gulf, Quebec
- In office October 20, 1897 – January 5, 1917
- Appointed by: Wilfrid Laurier
- Preceded by: Théodore Robitaille
- Succeeded by: David Ovide L'Espérance

Personal details
- Born: 7 February 1843 St-Cuthbert, Canada East
- Died: 5 January 1917 (aged 73) Rimouski, Quebec
- Party: Liberal
- Children: Eugène Fiset

Jean-Baptiste Romuald Fiset (7 February 1843 – 5 January 1917) was a Canadian physician and parliamentarian.

Born in St-Cuthbert, Canada East, the son of Henri Fiset, he was educated at the Collège de Montréal and the Université Laval. Fiset practised medicine at Rimouski. He also served on the town council and was mayor of Rimouski. In 1869, he married Aimée Plamondon.

Fiset was elected five times as the Liberal Member of Parliament representing the Quebec electoral district of Rimouski in the House of Commons of Canada. He was first elected in the Canadian federal election of 1872, and was re-elected in 1874 and 1878. Although he was defeated in 1882, he regained his seat in 1887. This pattern repeated when he lost once again in 1891, but regained his seat a final time in 1896.

A notable moment in his career in the house took place on 30 March 1874 when Fiset guided a hooded Louis Riel into the parliament buildings so that he might sign the parliamentary registry and thereby become an official Member of Parliament. Despite having been elected to parliament as the member for Provencher, Riel at that time was a fugitive because of his role in execution of Thomas Scott during the Red River Rebellion of 1869–1870.

Fiset was appointed to the Senate of Canada on 20 October 1897 on the recommendation of Sir Wilfrid Laurier. He represented the senatorial division of Gulf, Quebec until his death in Rimouski at the age of 73.
