= Eugène Fiset =

Canadian politician

Major-General The Honourable Sir Eugène Fiset KCMG DSO ED
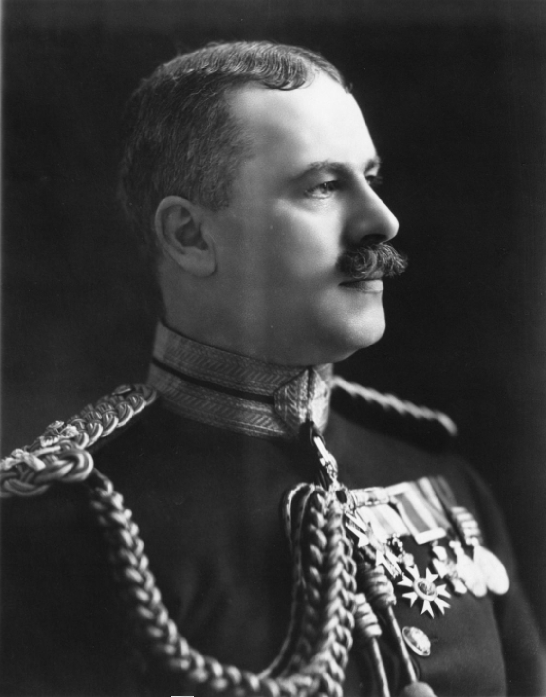

18th Lieutenant Governor of Quebec
- In office December 30, 1939 – October 3, 1950
- Monarch: George VI
- Governors General: The Lord Tweedsmuir; The Earl of Athlone; The Viscount Alexander of Tunis
- Premier: Adélard Godbout; Maurice Duplessis
- Preceded by: Ésioff-Léon Patenaude
- Succeeded by: Gaspard Fauteux

Member of the Canadian Parliament for Rimouski
- In office September 2, 1924 – December 30, 1939
- Preceded by: Joseph-Émile-Stanislas-Émmanuel D'Anjou
- Succeeded by: Joseph-Émile-Stanislas-Émmanuel D'Anjou

Personal details
- Born: March 15, 1874 Rimouski, Quebec, Canada
- Died: June 8, 1951 (aged 77) Quebec
- Party: Liberal
- Spouse(s): Zoé-Mary Stella Taschereau, daughter of Thomas Linière Taschereau
- Relations: Jean-Baptiste Romuald Fiset, father
- Education: Laval University
- Occupation: physician, military officer

Major-General Sir Marie-Joseph-Eugène Fiset, KCMG, DSO, ED (March 15, 1874 – June 8, 1951) was a Canadian physician, military officer, Deputy Minister of Militia and Defence, Member of Parliament, the 18th Lieutenant Governor of Quebec, and the 3rd Canadian Surgeon General.

== Early life ==
Born in Rimouski, Quebec, the son of Jean-Baptiste Romuald Fiset and Aimee Plamondon, Fiset was educated at Rimouski College and received a Bachelor of Arts degree and M.D. from Laval University.

== Military career ==
He joined the 89th Temiscouata and Rimouski Battalion of Infantry at the age of 16. His military career continued during his studies, he was promoted to the rank of lieutenant while a student. In 1899, he succeeded his father as surgeon to the 89th Battalion but, a few months later, joined the Second (Special Service) Battalion of The Royal Canadian Regiment with the rank of major and saw service in the South African War. For his service in the war, he was appointed a Companion of the Distinguished Service Order (DSO) in the October 1902 South African Honours list.

With the end of his tour of duty in South Africa in 1900, Fiset interned at the Nose and Throat Hospital in London and L'Hôpital Saint-Antoine in Paris.

After a year he returned to Rimouski before becoming an adjutant in the Royal Canadian Army Medical Corps. In 1902, he was part of the Canadian Coronation Contingent for King Edward VII's coronation and travelled to the United Kingdom as the Surgeon-Lieutenant of The Royal Canadian Regiment. In 1903, he was promoted to the rank of colonel and became Director-General of the service.

Fiset was promoted to the rank of Surgeon General (Major General) at the beginning of World War I. He was knighted for his service in the war while the French government named him a Commandeur of the Legion of Honour.

== Political career ==
He retired in 1923 and began a political career sitting in the House of Commons of Canada as the Liberal MP for Rimouski from 1924 until 1939. He served as Deputy Minister of Militia and Defence.

On December 30, 1939, Fiset became Lieutenant-Governor of Quebec. On two occasions during the war he opened the legislative assembly wearing his major general's uniform in order to express support for the war effort. He remained in office until October 1, 1950.

== See also ==
- Université Laval
