= CJBR-FM =

Radio station in Rimouski, Quebec, Canada

- Rimouski, Quebec; Canada
- Broadcast area: Bas-Saint-Laurent
- Frequency: 89.1 MHz

Programming
- Language: French
- Format: News/Talk
- Network: Ici Radio-Canada Première

Ownership
- Owner: Canadian Broadcasting Corporation

History
- First air date: November 15, 1937
- Former frequencies: 900 kHz (–2001)
- Call sign meaning: Jules Brillant/Rimouski; Brillant founded the station in 1937

Technical information
- Class: C1
- ERP: 29,539 watts average 46,387 watts peak horizontal polarization 5,876 watts average 9,515 watts peak vertical polarization
- HAAT: 297 metres (974 ft)
- Transmitter coordinates: 48°19′41.16″N 68°50′7.08″W

Links
- Website: Ici Radio-Canada Première

CJBR-FM is a French-language Canadian radio station located in Rimouski, Quebec. Owned and operated by the (government-owned) Canadian Broadcasting Corporation (French: Société Radio-Canada), it broadcasts on 89.1 MHz using a directional antenna with an average effective radiated power of 19,400 watts and a peak effective radiated power of 38,800 watts (class C1). The station has an ad-free news/talk format and is part of the Ici Radio-Canada Première network, which operates across Canada. Like all other Première stations, but unlike most FM stations, CJBR-FM broadcasts in mono.

== History ==
Previously known as CJBR when the station was on the AM band on 900 kHz, the station moved to FM in 2001. It is one of the few CBC/SRC stations to not have a call sign beginning with CB, as it was originally a privately owned station; CJBR was an affiliate of Radio-Canada from the station's opening in 1937 until it was bought by Radio-Canada in 1977. The call sign "CJBR" stands for Canada Jules Brillant Rimouski (Jules Brillant being the founder of the station). When it bought the station in 1977 from Telemedia (who acquired Brillant's broadcasting properties in 1970), Radio-Canada initially wanted to change the call sign to CBSL, but this plan was discarded after a petition was circulated against this change. A new private radio station, CFLP (now CJOI-FM), was opened in Rimouski the following year.

The station originally broadcast on 1030 kHz with 1,000 watts. On March 29, 1941, the station moved to 900 kHz. Power was increased to 5,000 watts full-time in 1947, and to 10,000 watts full-time in 1956. The AM transmitter was shut down on September 6, 2001 at 9 AM. Its FM sister station, originally called CJBR-FM, had to change its own call sign to CBRX-FM.

The station's current local programs are Info-réveil, in the mornings from 6 a.m. to 9 a.m., and Le monde aujourd'hui in the afternoons, 3:30 p.m. to 6 p.m. CJBR-FM also co-produces D'Est en est, a pan-regional program produced in turn with CBGA-FM Matane and CBSI-FM Sept-Îles and heard afternoons during the summer months. On public holidays, its local programs are replaced with local shows airing provincewide produced by different outlets in turn (except Montreal and Quebec City). Its Saturday morning program, Samedi et rien d'autre, originates from CBF-FM Montreal.

== Repeater ==
CJBR-FM operates only one relay station, namely CJBR-FM-1 in Rivière-du-Loup. That station opened in 1992 and operates on 89.5 MHz with an effective radiated power of 100,000 watts (class C) using an omnidirectional antenna located at 47°34′36.84″N 69°22′58.08″W. Listeners west of the area are served by Quebec City station CBV-FM and its relays, and listeners east of the area are served by CBGA-FM and its relays.

== Notable hosts ==
- Pierre Nadeau OC CQ, announcer from 1956 to 1957
- Sandy Burgess
