= Gérard Ouellet =

Canadian politician

Member of Parliament for Rimouski
- In office April 1963 – September 1965
- Preceded by: Gérard Légaré
- Succeeded by: Louis Guy LeBlanc

Personal details
- Born: 17 February 1913 East Hartford, Connecticut, United States
- Died: 3 April 1975 (aged 62) Rimouski, Quebec
- Party: Progressive Conservative; Social Credit
- Spouse: Germaine Parent
- Profession: farmer

Gérard Ouellet (17 February 1913 – 3 April 1975) was a member of the House of Commons of Canada. He was a farmer by career.

Ouellet was born in East Hartford, Connecticut, United States, the son of Emile Ouellet and Celina-Rose Berube. He was first elected as a Social Credit party candidate at the Rimouski riding in the 1963 general election after an earlier unsuccessful attempt to win the riding in the 1962 election. On 23 April 1964, Ouellet left the Social Credit party and joined the Progressive Conservative party for the remainder of his term in the 26th Canadian Parliament. In the 1965 federal election, Ouellet was defeated at Rimouski by Louis Guy LeBlanc of the Liberal party.
