= Ulysse-Janvier Robillard =

Canadian politician

Member of the Canadian Parliament for Beauharnois
- In office 1872–1878
- Preceded by: Michael Cayley
- Succeeded by: Michael Cayley

Personal details
- Born: 1826 Ste-Geneviève, Lower Canada
- Died: 1 January 1900 (aged 73–74)
- Party: Independent Conservative

Ulysse-Janvier Robillard (5 January 1826 – 27 December 1900) was a merchant and political figure in Lower Canada, later Quebec, Canada. He represented Beauharnois in the House of Commons of Canada from 1872 to 1878 as an Independent Conservative.

He was born in Ste-Geneviève, Lower Canada, the son of Joseph Robillard, and was educated there. Robillard was mayor of Beauharnois from 1864 to 1866. He was a produce and grain merchant in Beauharnois. Robillard was married twice: first to Eulalie Paiement and then to Marie-Virginie Lanaud in 1871. He died in Montreal at the age of 74.

1872 Canadian federal election: Beauharnois
Party	Candidate	Votes	%	±%
Independent Conservative	Ulysse-Janvier Robillard	854		
Conservative	Michael Cayley	764		
Source: Canadian Elections Database

1874 Canadian federal election: Beauharnois
Party	Candidate	Votes	%	±%
Independent Conservative	Ulysse-Janvier Robillard	711		
Unknown	M. Branchaud	346		
Conservative	Désiré Girouard	314		
Source: Canadian Elections Database
