= Louis Guy LeBlanc =

Canadian politician

- Official 1968 portrait

Member of Parliament for Rimouski
- In office November 1965 – September 1972
- Preceded by: Gérard Ouellet
- Succeeded by: Eudore Allard

Personal details
- Born: 23 January 1921 Saint-Gabriel, Quebec
- Died: 10 November 1990 (aged 69)
- Party: Liberal
- Profession: consulting forestry engineer, land surveyor, life insurance agent

Louis Guy LeBlanc (23 January 1921 – 10 November 1990) was a Liberal party member of the House of Commons of Canada. He was born in Saint-Gabriel, Quebec and became a consulting forestry engineer, land surveyor and life insurance agent by career.

He was first elected at the Rimouski riding in the 1965 general election, then re-elected there in the 1968 election. After completing his term in the 28th Canadian Parliament, LeBlanc was defeated at Rimouski in the 1972 federal election.
