= Louis-Joseph Papineau (Beauharnois, Quebec politician) =

Canadian politician (1861–1932)

Member of the Canadian Parliament for Beauharnois
- In office 1908–1925
- Preceded by: Joseph Gédéon Horace Bergeron
- Succeeded by: Maxime Raymond

Member of the Legislative Assembly of Quebec for Beauharnois
- In office 1927–1931
- Preceded by: Arthur Plante
- Succeeded by: Gontran Saintonge

Personal details
- Born: January 3, 1861 Sainte-Geneviève, Quebec, Canada
- Died: April 24, 1932 (aged 71) Salaberry-de-Valleyfield, Quebec
- Party: Liberal (1908–1911); Conservative (1911–1917); Laurier Liberal (1917–1921); Liberal (1921–1925)
- Other political affiliations: Quebec Liberal Party

Louis-Joseph Papineau (French pronunciation: [lwi ʒozɛf papino]; January 3, 1861 – April 24, 1932) was a Canadian politician and lawyer. He was first elected to the House of Commons of Canada in the 1908 federal election as the Liberal MP for Beauharnois, Quebec. He crossed the floor to join the Conservatives and was re-elected in the 1911 federal election. As a result of the Conscription Crisis of 1917, Papineau crossed the floor yet again to rejoin his old party and was re-elected in the 1917 federal election as a Laurier Liberal. He was re-elected in 1921, again as a Liberal before retiring from parliament with the 1925 federal election.

He was elected to the Legislative Assembly of Quebec in Beauharnois in the 1927 Quebec election for the Quebec Liberal Party. He did not run for re-election in 1931.

== Electoral record ==
1908 Canadian federal election: Beauharnois
Party	Candidate	Votes	%	±%
Liberal	Louis-Joseph Papineau	1,843		
Conservative	Joseph-Gédéon-Horace Bergeron	1,814		

1911 Canadian federal election: Beauharnois
Party	Candidate	Votes	%	±%
Conservative	Louis-Joseph Papineau	1,876		
Conservative	Joseph-Gédéon-Horace Bergeron	1,849		

1917 Canadian federal election: Beauharnois
Party	Candidate	Votes	%	±%
Opposition	Louis-Joseph Papineau	acclaimed		

1921 Canadian federal election: Beauharnois
Party	Candidate	Votes	%	±%
Liberal	Louis-Joseph Papineau	5,147		
Conservative	Rodolphe Monty	3,272		
