= Eva Côté =

Canadian politician (1934–2019)

Eva Lachance Côté (1 January 1934 in Rimouski, Quebec, Canada – 7 June 2019 in Beaupré, Quebec) was a Liberal party member of the House of Commons of Canada. She was an executive secretary by career.

She served in one term, the 32nd Canadian Parliament, after election at the Rimouski electoral district in the 1980 federal election. A previous attempt at national office in the 1979 federal election was also unsuccessful as was the attempt at re-election in the 1984 federal election at Rimouski—Témiscouata.
