= 1945 Canadian federal election =

- June 11, 1945

245 seats in the House of Commons 123 seats needed for a majority
- Opinion polls
- Turnout: 75.3% (▲5.4 pp)
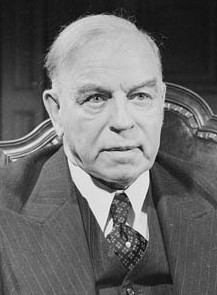

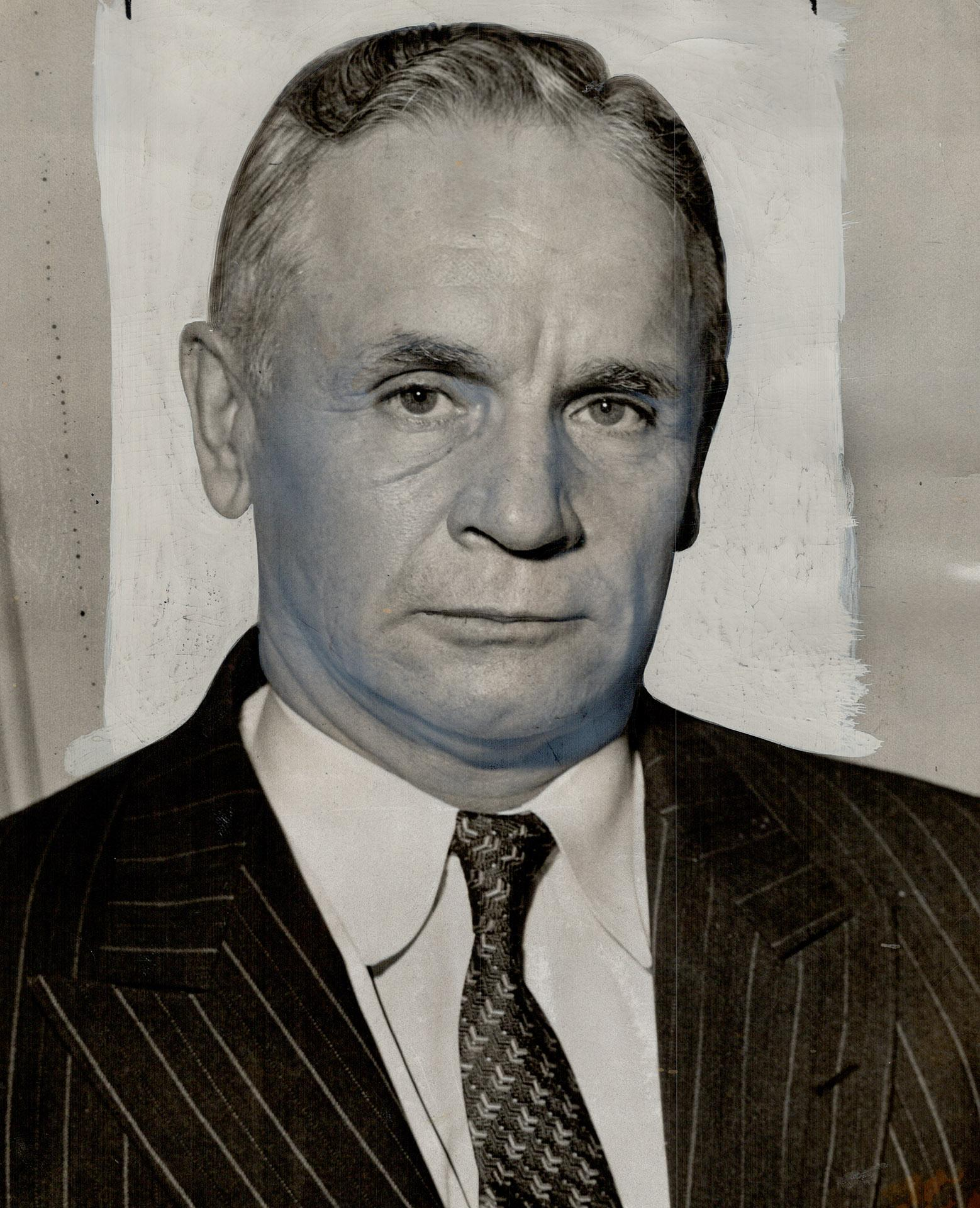

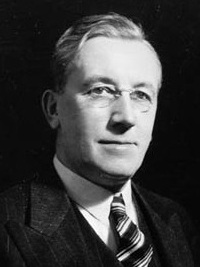

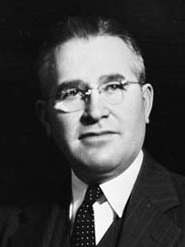

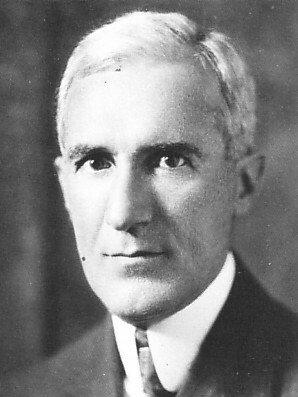

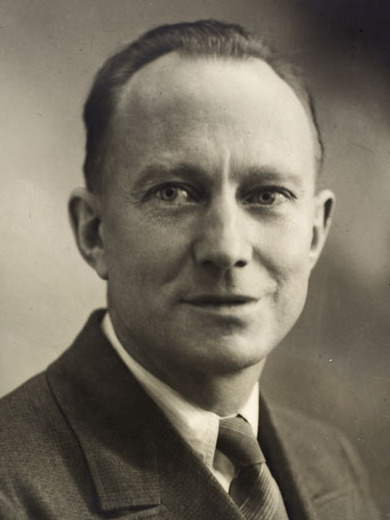
	First party	Second party	Third party
Leader	W. L. Mackenzie King	John Bracken	M. J. Coldwell
Party	Liberal	Progressive Conservative	Co-operative Commonwealth
Leader since	August 7, 1919	December 11, 1942	March 22, 1942
Leader's seat	Prince Albert (lost re-election)	Neepawa	Rosetown—Biggar
Last election	179 seats, 51.32%	39 seats, 29.24%	8 seats, 8.42%
Seats won	118	66	28
Seat change	▼61	▲27	▲20
Popular vote	2,086,545	1,448,744	815,720
Percentage	39.78%	27.62%	15.55%
Swing	▼11.54 pp	▼2.79 pp	▲7.31 pp
	Fourth party	Fifth party	Sixth party
Leader	Solon Earl Low	Maxime Raymond	Tim Buck
Party	Social Credit	Bloc populaire	Labor–Progressive^{3}
Leader since	April 6, 1944	February 10, 1943	1929
Leader's seat	Peace River	Beauharnois—Laprairie	Ran in Trinity (lost)
Last election	10 seats, 2.59%	New party	0 seats, 0.19%
Seats won	13	2	1
Seat change	▲3	▲2	▲1
Popular vote	212,220	172,765	111,892
Percentage	4.05%	3.29%	2.13%
Swing	▲1.46 pp	New party	▲1.94 pp

- The Canadian parliament after the 1945 election
Prime Minister before election
William Lyon Mackenzie King
Liberal
Prime Minister after election
William Lyon Mackenzie King
Liberal

The 1945 Canadian federal election was held on June 11, 1945, to elect members of the House of Commons of the 20th Parliament of Canada. Prime Minister William Lyon Mackenzie King's Liberals won a third term. The party fell five seats short of majority government but was able to rule in majority in practice with the support of eight Independent Liberal MPs.

Since 1939, Canada had been fighting in World War II. In May 1945, the war in Europe ended, allowing King to call an election. As the war in Asia was still raging on, King promised a voluntary force to fight in Operation Downfall, the planned invasion of Japan, while Progressive Conservative Party (PC Party) leader John Bracken promised conscription, which was an unpopular proposal and led to the PCs' third consecutive defeat. The Liberals were also re-elected because of their promise to expand welfare programs. However, they also lost about a third of their seats; this stark decline in support was partly attributed to their introduction of conscription in 1944 (which was unpopular in Quebec, paving the rise of the Bloc Populaire) as well as the breakthrough of the democratic socialist Co-operative Commonwealth Federation (CCF), which campaigned on an even bigger expansion of the welfare state than the Liberals. The Social Credit Party made modest gains.

Although the election officially resulted in a minority government, the election of eight "Independent Liberal" MPs, most of whom did not run as official Liberals because of their opposition to conscription, gave the King government an effective working majority in parliament. Most of the Independent Liberal MPs joined (or re-joined) the Liberal caucus following World War II when the conscription issue became moot. As King was defeated in his own riding of Prince Albert, fellow Liberal William MacDiarmid, who was re-elected in the safe seat of Glengarry, resigned so that a by-election could be held, which was subsequently won by King.

== Background ==
In the 1935 election, the Liberal Party led by William Lyon Mackenzie King returned to power (King's Liberals had previously governed Canada from 1921 to 1930) with a landslide majority government. The King government's success in combatting the Great Depression led to their second landslide majority victory in the 1940 election. From 1939 to 1945, the King government's main priority was aiding the Allies in World War II.

In the period leading up to the election, the Co-operative Commonwealth Federation was rising in popularity. A Gallup poll from September 1943 showed the CCF with a one-point lead over both the Liberals and Progressive Conservatives. Many predicted a major breakthrough for the CCF nationally and the party was expected to win 70 to 100 seats, possibly even enough to form a minority government. In the Saskatchewan provincial election, the CCF won a landslide victory, forming a provincial government for the first time.

In 1942, members of the Conservative Party held the Port Hope Conference, which established several Conservative goals including support for free enterprise and conscription, and more radical policies such as full-employment, low-cost housing, trade union rights, as well as a whole range of social security measures, including a government financed medicare system. Progressive Party Premier of Manitoba John Bracken became the Conservative Party's leader that same year, and changed the party's name to the Progressive Conservative Party as a result of this policy shift.

== Campaign ==
=== Liberals ===
Government Stability was a key issue of the election. The Liberals urged voters to "Return the Mackenzie King Government", and argued that only the Liberal Party had a "preponderance of members in all nine provinces". Mackenzie King threatened to call a new election if he was not given a majority: "We would have confusion to deal with at a time when the world will be in a very disturbed situation. The war in Europe is over, but unrest in the east is not over."

Social welfare programs were also an issue in the campaign. Another Liberal slogan encouraged voters to "Build a New Social Order" by endorsing the Liberal platform, which included

- $750 million to provide land, jobs and business support for veterans;
- $400 million of public spending to build housing;
- $250 million for family allowances;
- establishing an Industrial development Bank;
- loans to farmers, floor prices for agricultural products;
- tax reductions.

=== Progressive Conservatives ===
The Progressive Conservatives tried to capitalize on the massive mid-campaign victory by the Ontario Progressive Conservative Party in the 1945 Ontario provincial election. PC campaign ads exhorted voters to rally behind their party: "Ontario shows! Only Bracken can win!", and suggesting that it would be impossible to form a majority government in the country without a plurality of seats in Ontario, which only the Tories could win.

Operation Downfall, the invasion of Japan, was scheduled for late 1945-early 1946. Bracken had promised conscription for the invasion of Japan whereas King had promised to commit one division of volunteers to the planned invasion of Japan. Based on the way that the Japanese had fought the battles of Iwo Jima and Okinawa it was widely expected that the invasion of the Japanese home islands would be a bloody campaign, and Bracken's promise of conscription for the planned invasion of Japan did much to turn voters against his party.

Despite the party's performance ultimately being their best since R.B. Bennett's government was ousted in a landslide a decade previously, Bracken was widely held responsible for their failure to make a better showing – aside from the conscription issue, many believed that his western populism was a futile approach, and that the Tories could not hope to compete with the CCF and Socreds in the west – and the party grandees immediately began pressuring him to resign in favour of George A. Drew, who had led the Ontario Progressive Conservatives to their provincial election victory; Bracken would eventually do so in 1948.

=== Co-operative Commonwealth Federation ===
Campaigning under the slogan, "Work, Security, and Freedom for All – with the CCF", the CCF promised to retain war-time taxes on high incomes and excess profits in order to fund social services, and to abolish the Senate of Canada. The CCF fought hard to prevent the support of labour from going to the Labor-Progressive Party (i.e., the Communist Party of Canada).

The LPP, for its part, pointed out that the CCF's refusal to enter into an electoral pact with the LPP had cost the CCF 100,000 votes in the Ontario election, and had given victory to the Ontario PCs. It urged voters to "Make Labour a Partner in Government."

=== Social Credit ===
The Social Credit Party of Canada tried, with modest success, to capitalize on the positive image of the Alberta Socred government of Ernest Manning (who had succeeded the party's founding leader, William Aberhart on his death two years earlier), asking voters, "Good Government in Alberta -- Why Not at Ottawa?". Referring to social credit monetary theories, the party encouraged voters to "Vote for the National Dividend".

While the party's presence outside of Alberta was minimal, its strongest showing elsewhere was in Quebec, where it collaborated with the provincial Union des electeurs under future Socred leader Réal Caouette. The Union would subsequently contest the next federal election as an independent party before disappearing, but it foreshadowed Social Credit's emergence to the Liberals as the main competition in Quebec throughout the 1960s and 1970s.

== Opinion polling ==
Evolution of voting intentions at national level
Polling firm	Last day of survey	Source	LPC	PC	CCF	SC	BP	Other	ME	Sample
Election 1945	June 11, 1945		39.78	27.62	15.55	4.05	3.29	5.42		
Gallup	June 9, 1945		39	29	17	4	5	6 (Note: Taken from difference between Public Opinion Quarterly and Evening Citizen data)	—N/a	—N/a
Gallup	April 1945		36	29	20	4	6	5	—N/a	—N/a
Gallup	January 1945		36	28	22	4	6	4	—N/a	—N/a
Gallup	November 1944		36	28	23	—N/a	5	8	—N/a	—N/a
Gallup	September 1944		36	27	24	4	5	4	—N/a	—N/a
Gallup	June 1944		35	30	21	—N/a	7	7	—N/a	—N/a
Gallup	March 1944		34	30	22	—N/a	8	6	—N/a	—N/a
Gallup	January 1944		31	29	24	3	9	4	—N/a	—N/a
Gallup	December 1943		31	29	26	—N/a	8	6	—N/a	—N/a
Gallup	September 1943		28	28	29	3	9	3	—N/a	—N/a
Gallup	June 1943		35	31	21	—N/a	8	5	—N/a	—N/a
Gallup	May 1943		36	28	21	—N/a	10	5	—N/a	—N/a
Gallup	February 1943		32	27	23	—N/a	7	11	—N/a	—N/a
Gallup	December 1942		36	24	23	—N/a	—N/a	17	—N/a	—N/a
Bloc populaire founded (September 8, 1942)
Gallup	September 1942		39	23	21	6	—N/a	11	—N/a	—N/a
Gallup	January 1942		55	30	10	2	—N/a	3	—N/a	—N/a
Election 1940	March 26, 1940		51.32	29.24	8.42	2.59				

== National results ==

Party	Party leader	# of candidates	Seats			Popular vote		
Party	Party leader	# of candidates	1940	Elected	% Change	#	%	pp Change
Liberal	W. L. Mackenzie King	236	179	118	-33.9%	2,086,545	39.78%	-11.54
Progressive Conservative^{1}	John Bracken	203	39	66	+66.7%	1,448,744	27.62%	-2.79
Co-operative Commonwealth	M. J. Coldwell	205	8	28	+250%	815,720	15.55%	+7.31
Social Credit^{2}	Solon Earl Low	93	10	13	+30.0%	212,220	4.05%	+1.46
Independent Liberal		21	2	8	+300%	93,791	1.79%	-1.40
Independent		64	1	6	+500%	256,381	4.89%	+3.65
Bloc populaire	Maxime Raymond	35	*	2	*	172,765	3.29%	*
Labor–Progressive^{3}	Tim Buck	68	1^{6}	1^{6}		111,892	2.13%	+1.94
Independent PC		8	*	1	*	14,541	0.28%	*
Independent CCF^{4}		2	*	1	*	6,402	0.12%	*
Liberal–Progressive		1	3	1	-66.7%	6,147	0.12%	-0.48
National Government^{5}		1		-		4,872	0.09%	
Trades Union		1	*	-	*	4,679	0.09%	*
Farmer-Labour		2	-	-	-	3,620	0.07%	-0.11
Independent Conservative		1	-	-	-100%	2,653	0.05%	-0.18
Democratic	W.R.N. Smith	5	*	-	*	2,603	0.05%	*
Union of Electors		1	*	-	*	596	0.01%	*
Socialist Labour		2	*	-	*	459	0.01%	*
Labour		1	-	-	-	423	0.01%	-0.07
Liberal-Labour		1	*	-	*	345	0.01%	*
Independent Labour		1	*	-	*	241	x	*
Farmer		1	-	-	-	70	x	x
Total		953	245	245	-	5,245,709	100%	
Sources: http://www.elections.ca -- History of Federal Ridings since 1867

Notes:

* The party did not nominate candidates in the previous election.

x - less than 0.005% of the popular vote.

^{1} 1945 Progressive Conservative vote compared to 1940 National Government + Conservative vote.

^{2} 1945 Social Credit vote compared to 1940 New Democracy + Social Credit vote.

^{3} 1945 Labor-Progressive vote compared to 1940 Communist vote.

^{4} The successful "Independent CCF" candidate ran as a People's Co-operative Commonwealth Federation candidate.

^{5} One Progressive Conservative candidate ran under the "National Government" label that the party had used in the 1940 election.

^{6} MP Dorise Nielsen was elected in 1940 as a Unity candidate in North Battleford. She joined the Labor-Progressive Party in 1943 and ran for re-election in 1945 as an LPP MP and lost. Fred Rose was elected to parliament for Cartier as a Labor-Progressive MP in a 1943 by-election. He was re-elected in 1945.

== Vote and seat summaries ==
1945 Canadian General Election Map by Riding

Ternary plots - shift of electoral support (1940-1945)
1940

1945
Electoral districts identified by colours of winning parties

Popular vote
Liberal	39.78%
PC	27.62%
CCF	15.55%
Social Credit	4.05%
Bloc populaire	3.29%
Labor-Progressive	2.13%
Others	7.58%

Seat totals
Liberal	48.16%
PC	27.34%
CCF	11.42%
Social Credit	5.30%
Bloc populaire	0.81%
Labor-Progressive	0.40%
Others	7.34%

== Results by province ==
Party name		BC	AB	SK	MB	ON	QC	NB	NS	PE	YK	Total
Liberal	Seats:	5	2	2	9	34	47	7	9	3		118
Liberal	Popular Vote:	27.5	21.8	33.0	32.7	40.8	46.5	50.0	45.7	48.4		39.8
Progressive Conservative	Seats:	5	2	1	2	48	1	3	2	1	1	66
Progressive Conservative	Vote:	30.0	18.7	18.8	24.9	41.4	9.7	38.3	36.8	47.4	40.0	27.6
Co-operative Commonwealth	Seats:	4	-	18	5	-	-	-	1	-	-	28
Co-operative Commonwealth	Vote:	29.4	18.4	44.4	31.6	14.3	2.4	7.4	16.7	4.2	27.5	15.6
Social Credit	Seats:	-	13	-	-	-	-					13
Social Credit	Vote:	2.3	36.6	3.0	3.2	0.2	4.4					4.0
Independent Liberal	Seats:	1					7	-				8
Independent Liberal	Vote:	1.7					5.9	1.1				1.8
Independent	Seats:				-	-	6	-	-			6
Independent	Vote:				0.8	0.4	16.9	3.2	0.2			4.9
Bloc populaire	Seats:					-	2					2
Bloc populaire	Vote:					0.3	11.9					3.3
Labor–Progressive	Seats:	-	-	-	-	-	1		-		-	1
Labor–Progressive	Vote:	5.9	4.5	0.8	5.0	2.0	1.0		0.6		32.4	2.1
Independent PC	Seats:					-	1					1
Independent PC	Vote:					xx	1.0					0.3
Independent CCF	Seats:	1					-					1
Independent CCF	Vote:	1.4					xx					0.1
Liberal-Progressive	Seats:				1							1
Liberal-Progressive	Vote:				1.9							0.1
Total Seats		16	17	21	17	82	65	10	12	4	1	245
Parties that won no seats:
National Government	Vote:					0.3						0.1
Trades Union	Vote:	1.1										0.1
Farmer-Labour	Vote:					0.2						0.1
Independent Conservative	Vote:						0.2					0.1
Democratic	Vote:	0.6										xx
Union of Electors	Vote:						xx					xx
Socialist Labour	Vote:	0.1										xx
Labour	Vote:						xx					xx
Liberal-Labour	Vote:						xx					xx
Independent Labour	Vote:					0.1						xx
Farmer	Vote:						xx					xx

xx - less than 0.05% of the popular vote.

== See also ==
- List of Canadian federal general elections
- List of political parties in Canada
- 20th Canadian Parliament
