= Canadian federal election results in the Laurentides, Outaouais and Northern Quebec =

Electoral history (since 1958)

Liberal
Conservative
New Democratic
Bloc Québécois
Social Credit (defunct)
Progressive Conservative (defunct)

Electoral history (1867–1957)
Year	Results
1957	
1953	
1949	
1945	
1940	
1935	
1930	
1926	
1925	
1921	
1917	
1911	
1908	
1904	
1900	
1896	
1891	
1887	
1882	
1878	
1874	
1872	
1867	

Canadian federal elections have provided the following results in the Laurentides, Outaouais and Northern Quebec.

== Regional profile ==
The Outaouais is one of the most federalist areas of Quebec outside of Montreal because of its close proximity to Ottawa and its concurrent large population of civil servants. However, Northern Quebec and the Laurentides have long been strongly nationalist, a recipe for two decades of Bloc Québécois dominance. In a recent by-election were the Liberals temporally able to get the traditionally Bloquist riding of Temiscamingue, having previously gained the northern riding of Abitibi—Baie-James—Nunavik in 1997.

Social Credit did well here from the 1960s through the 1970s, usually winning two or three seats; Réal Caouette, the main voice of Social Credit in the province, was from this area. Hull—Aylmer was one of the few ridings outside the Montreal area that was not swept up in the Brian Mulroney tide, as it went Liberal in both 1984 and 1988; in 1984 it was one of only five Liberal-held ridings outside Montreal in the entire province. The Liberals managed to retake Gatineau in 1988. In 2006, however, everything changed as Liberal support melted here; the party lost two of their three Outaouais seats – one to the Bloc and one to the Conservatives.

The region was swept up in the massive NDP tsunami that swept through Quebec in 2011, as the NDP took every seat here by considerable margins (9,000 votes or more), ousting the region's highest-profile MP, Foreign Affairs Minister Lawrence Cannon in Pontiac. The NDP even snapped up Hull—Aylmer—a seat that had been in Liberal hands since the riding's creation in 1917. In 2015, the Liberals took all of the Outoauais, and took four ridings in the Laurentides. The Bloc took three Laurentides ridings, while the NDP was reduced to the two northernmost ridings in the province. The region reverted to type in 2019. The Bloc swept the north and took all but one seat in the Laurentides, while the Liberals maintained their sweep of the Outaouais and narrowly held onto one Laurentides seat.

This situation, however, changed dramatically in the 2025 election. The Liberals gained a surge of support at the expense of the Bloc, flipping five seats: one in Northern Quebec and four in the Laurentides. One of these, Terrebonne, they carried by a single vote; the election results were later annulled by the Supreme Court of Canada.

=== Votes by party throughout time ===
Election	Liberal	Bloc Québécois	New Democratic	Conservative	Green	People's	PC	Reform / Alliance	Social Credit	Others
1979	238,125; 60.2%	—	25,338; 6.4%	—	—	—	44,505; 11.3%	—	74,900; 18.9%	12,587; 3.2%
1980	252,593; 67.6%	—	39,460; 10.6%	—	—	—	37,532; 10.0%	—	30,121; 8.1%	14,194; 3.8%
1984	140,193; 32.2%	—N/a	42,633; 9.8%	—	No candidate	—	228,843; 52.5%	—	—	24,048; 5.5%
1988	123,457; 27.5%	—	77,519; 17.5%	—	No candidate	—	228,347; 50.7%	—	—	19,675; 4.4%
1993	166,954; 32.8%	249,301; 48.9%	7,514; 1.5%	—	No candidate	—	79,095; 15.5%	No candidate	—	6,567; 1.3%
1997	171,018; 37.5%	173,629; 38.1%	8,676; 1.9%	—	586; 0.1%	—	97,516; 21.4%	935; 0.2%	—	3,497; 0.8%
2000	184,170; 42.4%	179,322; 41.3%	8,265; 1.9%	—	2,697; 0.6%	—	22,190; 5.1%	30,560; 7.0%	—	6,685; 1.5%
2004	137,409; 31.3%	228,686; 52.1%	20,318; 4.6%	34,411; 7.8%	16,470; 3.8%	—	Merged into Conservative Party		—	1,538; 0.4%
2006	89,131; 18.4%	229,474; 47.3%	41,767; 8.6%	104,543; 21.6%	19,748; 4.1%	—	Merged into Conservative Party		—	232; 0.0%
2008	106,047; 22.0%	197,802; 41.1%	69,900; 14.5%	88,503; 18.4%	18,012; 3.7%	—	Merged into Conservative Party		—	1,197; 0.2%
2011	60,306; 11.5%	121,748; 23.3%	265,660; 50.8%	63,402; 12.1%	10,877; 2.1%	—	Merged into Conservative Party		—	732; 0.1%
2015	245,736; 37.1%	143,881; 21.7%	190,633; 28.8%	66,779; 10.1%	13,314; 2.0%	—	Merged into Conservative Party		—	2,661; 0.4%
2019	240,469; 35.7%	256,537; 38.1%	60,648; 9.0%	72,592; 10.8%	33,296; 4.9%	6,636; 1.0%	Merged into Conservative Party		—	2,858; 1.0%
2021	216,107; 33.8%	241,664; 37.8%	52,000; 8.1%	79,975; 12.5%	10,962; 1.7%	23,261; 3.6%	Merged into Conservative Party		—	15,685; 2.4%
2025	314,608; 43.5%	228,930; 31.7%	21,810; 3.0%	144,940; 20.0%	6,729; 0.9%	5,108; 0.7%	Merged into Conservative Party		—N/a	1,010; 0.1%

Vote share by party

Liberal
Conservative
New Democratic
Bloc Québécois
Green
People's
Social Credit (defunct)
Reform (defunct)
Alliance (defunct)
Progressive Conservative (defunct)

== 2021 ==
Electoral district	Candidates								Incumbent
Electoral district	Liberal	Conservative	BQ	NDP	Green	PPC	FPC	Other	Incumbent
Abitibi—Baie-James—Nunavik—Eeyou	Lise Kistabish; 7,384; 25.97%	Steve Corriveau; 4,508; 15.85%	Sylvie Bérubé; 10,784; 37.92%	Pauline Lameboy; 3,323; 11.69%	Didier Pilon; 442; 1.55%	Michaël Cloutier; 1,072; 3.77%	Cédric Brazeau; 594; 2.09%	Jimmy Levesque (Mar.); 329; 1.16%	Sylvie Bérubé
Abitibi—Témiscamingue	William Legault-Lacasse; 11,013; 24.11%	Luis Henry Gonzalez Venegas; 5,339; 11.69%	Sébastien Lemire; 23,120; 50.61%	Bethany Stewart; 2,794; 6.12%	Martin Chartrand; 748; 1.64%	Eric Lacroix; 1,538; 3.37%	Dany Goulet; 858; 1.88%	Joël Lirette (Rhino.); 275; 0.60%	Sébastien Lemire
Argenteuil—La Petite-Nation	Stéphane Lauzon; 19,371; 38.27%	Marie Louis-Seize; 6,547; 12.94%	Yves Destroismaisons; 17,842; 35.25%	Michel Welt; 3,390; 6.70%		Marc Vachon; 2,777; 5.49%	Paul Lynes; 686; 1.36%		Stéphane Lauzon
Gatineau	Steven MacKinnon; 26,267; 50.04%	Joel E. Bernard; 5,752; 10.96%	Geneviève Nadeau; 12,278; 23.39%	Fernanda Rengel; 4,508; 8.59%	Rachid Jemmah; 783; 1.49%	Mathieu Saint-Jean; 2,264; 4.31%	Luc Lavoie; 411; 0.78%	Sébastien Grenier (Rhino.); 178 0.34%	Steven MacKinnon
Gatineau	Steven MacKinnon; 26,267; 50.04%	Joel E. Bernard; 5,752; 10.96%	Geneviève Nadeau; 12,278; 23.39%	Fernanda Rengel; 4,508; 8.59%	Rachid Jemmah; 783; 1.49%	Mathieu Saint-Jean; 2,264; 4.31%	Luc Lavoie; 411; 0.78%	Pierre Soublière (M-L); 56 0.11%	Steven MacKinnon
Hull—Aylmer	Greg Fergus; 26,892; 52.47%	Sandrine Perion; 5,507; 10.75%	Simon Provost; 8,323; 16.24%	Samuel Gendron; 6,483; 12.65%	Simon Gnocchini-Messier; 1,459; 2.85%	Eric Fleury; 1,864; 3.64%	Josée Lafleur; 375; 0.73%	Catherine Dickins (Ind.); 143 0.28%	Greg Fergus
Hull—Aylmer	Greg Fergus; 26,892; 52.47%	Sandrine Perion; 5,507; 10.75%	Simon Provost; 8,323; 16.24%	Samuel Gendron; 6,483; 12.65%	Simon Gnocchini-Messier; 1,459; 2.85%	Eric Fleury; 1,864; 3.64%	Josée Lafleur; 375; 0.73%	Mike LeBlanc (Rhino.); 203 0.40%	Greg Fergus
Laurentides—Labelle	Antoine Menassa; 15,966; 24.90%	Kathy Laframboise; 6,770; 10.56%	Marie-Hélène Gaudreau; 32,133; 50.11%	Eric-Abel Baland; 3,907; 6.09%	Michel Le Comte; 1,570; 2.45%	Richard Evanko; 2,432; 3.79%	Michel Leclerc; 1,165; 1.82%	Jean-Noël Sorel (Ind.); 180; 0.28%	Marie-Hélène Gaudreau
Mirabel	François Loza; 14,842; 23.52%	Catherine Lefebvre; 8,510; 13.48%	Jean-Denis Garon; 29,376; 46.55%	Benoit Bourassa; 5,221; 8.27%	Mario Guay; 1,412; 2.24%	Christian Montpetit; 2,569; 4.07%	Ariane Croteau; 1,182; 1.87%		Simon Marcil†
Pontiac	Sophie Chatel; 26,899; 43.38%	Michel Gauthier; 12,804; 20.65%	Gabrielle Desjardins; 10,424; 16.81%	Denise Giroux; 6,824; 11.01%	Shaughn McArthur; 1,711; 2.76%	David Bruce Gottfred; 2,813; 4.54%	Geneviève Labonté-Chartrand; 480; 0.77%	James McNair (CFF); 52; 0.08%	Will Amos†
Rivière-des-Mille-Îles	Linda Lapointe; 18,835; 35.29%	Marc Duffy-Vincelette; 5,479; 10.27%	Luc Desilets; 21,645; 40.56%	Joseph Hakizimana; 3,852; 7.22%	Alec Ware; 972; 1.82%	Hans Roker Jr; 1,468; 2.75%	Valérie Beauséjour; 847; 1.59%	Julius Bute (PIQ); 119 0.22%	Luc Desilets
Rivière-des-Mille-Îles	Linda Lapointe; 18,835; 35.29%	Marc Duffy-Vincelette; 5,479; 10.27%	Luc Desilets; 21,645; 40.56%	Joseph Hakizimana; 3,852; 7.22%	Alec Ware; 972; 1.82%	Hans Roker Jr; 1,468; 2.75%	Valérie Beauséjour; 847; 1.59%	Michael Dionne (Pat.); 149 0.28%	Luc Desilets
Rivière-du-Nord	Theodora Bajkin; 12,767; 22.27%	Patricia Morrissette; 6,803; 11.87%	Rhéal Fortin; 29,943; 52.23%	Mary-Helen Paspaliaris; 3,958; 6.90%		Keeyan Ravanshid; 2,164; 3.77%	Marie-Eve Damour; 1,036; 1.81%	Jean-François René (Rhino.); 373 0.65%	Rhéal Fortin
Rivière-du-Nord	Theodora Bajkin; 12,767; 22.27%	Patricia Morrissette; 6,803; 11.87%	Rhéal Fortin; 29,943; 52.23%	Mary-Helen Paspaliaris; 3,958; 6.90%		Keeyan Ravanshid; 2,164; 3.77%	Marie-Eve Damour; 1,036; 1.81%	Nicolas Riqueur-Lainé (PIQ); 285 0.50%	Rhéal Fortin
Terrebonne	Eric Forget; 17,475; 29.64%	Frédérick Desjardins; 6,183; 10.49%	Nathalie Sinclair-Desgagné; 24,270; 41.17%	Luke Mayba; 3,913; 6.64%	David Hamelin- Schuilenburg; 847; 1.44%	Louis Stinziani; 1,594; 2.70%	Nathan Fortin-Dubé; 803; 1.36%	Michel Boudrias (NA); 3,864; 6.55%	Michel Boudrias§
Thérèse-De Blainville	Ramez Ayoub; 18,396; 35.18%	Marc Bissonnette; 5,773; 11.04%	Louise Chabot; 21,526; 41.17%	Julienne Soumaoro; 3,827; 7.32%	Simon Paré-Poupart; 1,018; 1.95%	Vincent Aubé; 1,386; 2.65%	Peggy Tassignon; 362; 0.69%		Louise Chabot

== 2019 ==
Electoral district	Candidates							Incumbent
Electoral district	Liberal	Conservative	BQ	NDP	Green	PPC	Other	Incumbent
Abitibi—Baie-James—Nunavik—Eeyou	Isabelle Bergeron; 8,963; 28.31%	Martin Ferron; 5,240; 16.55%	Sylvie Bérubé; 11,432; 36.11%	Jacline Rouleau; 4,104; 12.96%	Kiara Cabana-Whiteley; 1,151; 3.64%	Guillaume Lanouette; 379; 1.20%	Daniel Simon (Mar.); 387; 1.22%	Romeo Saganash†
Abitibi—Témiscamingue	Claude Thibault; 12,417; 24.76%	Mario Provencher; 7,537; 15.03%	Sébastien Lemire; 22,803; 45.47%	Alain Guimond; 5,093; 10.15%	Aline Bégin; 1,818; 3.62%	Jacques Girard; 487; 0.97%		Christine Moore†
Argenteuil—La Petite-Nation	Stéphane Lauzon; 18,896; 37.79%	Marie Louis-Seize; 6,044; 12.09%	Yves Destroismaisons; 18,167; 36.34%	Charlotte Boucher Smoley; 3,758; 7.52%	Marjorie Valiquette; 2,411; 4.82%	Sherwin Edwards; 721; 1.44%		Stéphane Lauzon
Gatineau	Steven MacKinnon; 29,084; 52.14%	Sylvie Goneau; 5,745; 10.30%	Geneviève Nadeau; 11,926; 21.38%	Eric Chaurette; 6,128; 10.99%	Guy Dostaler; 2,264; 4.06%	Mario-Roberto Lam; 560; 1.00%	Pierre Soublière (M-L); 76; 0.14%	Steven MacKinnon
Hull—Aylmer	Greg Fergus; 29,732; 54.07%	Mike Duggan; 4,979; 9.05%	Joanie Riopel; 8,011; 14.57%	Nicolas Thibodeau; 7,467; 13.58%	Josée Poirier Defoy; 3,869; 7.04%	Rowen Tanguay; 638; 1.16%	Alexandre Deschênes (M-L); 102; 0.19% Sébastien Grenier (Rhino.); 195; 0.35%	Greg Fergus
Laurentides—Labelle	David Graham; 21,655; 33.11%	Serge Grégoire; 4,983; 7.62%	Marie-Hélène Gaudreau; 30,625; 46.82%	Claude Dufour; 4,122; 6.30%	Gaël Chantrel; 3,157; 4.83%	Richard Evanko; 418; 0.64%	Michel Leclerc (Ind.); 174; 0.27% Ludovic Schneider (Rhino.); 272; 0.42%	David Graham
Mirabel	Karl Trudel; 16,162; 24.85%	François Desrochers; 5,940; 9.13%	Simon Marcil; 33,219; 51.08%	Anne-Marie Saint-Germain; 5,219; 8.03%	Julie Tremblay; 3,517; 5.41%	Christian Montpetit; 641; 0.99%	Pietro Biacchi (PIQ); 332; 0.51%	Simon Marcil
Pontiac	William Amos; 30,217; 48.86%	Dave Blackburn; 10,416; 16.84%	Jonathan Carreiro-Benoit; 9,929; 16.05%	Denise Giroux; 6,503; 10.51%	Claude Bertrand; 3,762; 6.08%	Mario Belec; 775; 1.25%	Louis Lang (M-L); 51; 0.08% Shawn Stewart (VCP); 194; 0.31%	Will Amos
Rivière-des-Mille-Îles	Linda Lapointe; 21,009; 36.11%	Maikel Mikhael; 4,684; 8.05%	Luc Desilets; 23,629; 40.61%	Joseph Hakizimana; 5,002; 8.60%	Ceylan Borgers; 3,015; 5.18%	Hans Roker Jr; 845; 1.45%		Linda Lapointe
Rivière-du-Nord	Florence Gagnon; 13,402; 22.30%	Sylvie Fréchette; 7,120; 11.85%	Rhéal Fortin; 31,281; 52.05%	Myriam Ouellette; 4,194; 6.98%	Joey Leckman; 3,345; 5.57%	Normand Michaud; 407; 0.68%	Nicolas Riqueur-Lainé (PIQ); 225; 0.37% Lucie St-Gelais (Ind.); 127; 0.21%	Rhéal Fortin
Terrebonne	Frédéric Beauchemin; 17,944; 29.26%	France Gagnon; 4,640; 7.57%	Michel Boudrias; 31,029; 50.59%	Maxime Beaudoin; 4,627; 7.54%	Réjean Monette; 2,277; 3.71%	Jeffrey Barnes; 399; 0.65%	Jade Hébert (Ind.); 159; 0.28% Paul Vézina (Rhino.); 260; 0.42%	Michel Boudrias
Thérèse-De Blainville	Ramez Ayoub; 20,988; 35.85%	Marie Claude Fournier; 5,264; 8.99%	Louise Chabot; 24,486; 41.82%	Hannah Wolker; 4,431; 7.57%	Normand Beaudet; 2,710; 4.63%	Désiré Mounanga; 366; 0.63%	Alain Lamontagne (Rhino.); 215; 0.37% Andy Piano (Ind.); 89; 0.15%	Ramez Ayoub

== 2015 ==
Electoral district	Candidates						Incumbent
Electoral district	Conservative	NDP	Liberal	BQ	Green	Other	Incumbent
Abitibi—Baie-James— Nunavik—Eeyou	Steven Hébert; 3,211; 9.30%	Romeo Saganash; 12,778; 37.02%	Pierre Dufour; 11,094; 32.14%	Luc Ferland; 6,398; 18.54%	Patrick Benoît; 779; 2.26%	Mario Gagnon (Rhino.); 258; 0.75%	Romeo Saganash
Abitibi—Témiscamingue	Benoit Fortin; 3,425; 6.89%	Christine Moore; 20,636; 41.50%	Claude Thibault; 14,733; 29.63%	Yvon Moreau; 9,651; 19.41%	Aline Bégin; 859; 1.73%	Pascal Le Fou Gélinas (Rhino.); 425; 0.85%	Christine Moore
Argenteuil—La Petite-Nation	Maxime Hupé-Labelle; 5,680; 11.12%	Chantal Crête; 12,650; 24.77%	Stéphane Lauzon; 22,093; 43.26%	Jonathan Beauchamp; 9,525; 18.65%	Audrey Lamarche; 1,118; 2.19%		Mylène Freeman‡ Argenteuil—Papineau—Mirabel
Gatineau	Luc Angers; 4,733; 8.19%	Françoise Boivin; 15,352; 26.56%	Steven MacKinnon; 31,076; 53.76%	Philippe Boily; 5,455; 9.44%	Guy Dostaler; 942; 1.63%	Guy J Bellavance (Ind.); 148 0.26%	Françoise Boivin
Gatineau	Luc Angers; 4,733; 8.19%	Françoise Boivin; 15,352; 26.56%	Steven MacKinnon; 31,076; 53.76%	Philippe Boily; 5,455; 9.44%	Guy Dostaler; 942; 1.63%	Pierre Soublière (M-L); 94 0.16%	Françoise Boivin
Hull—Aylmer	Étienne Boulrice; 4,278; 7.72%	Nycole Turmel; 17,472; 31.52%	Greg Fergus; 28,478; 51.37%	Maude Chouinard-Boucher; 3,625; 6.54%	Roger Fleury; 1,035; 1.87%	Luc Desjardins (Ind.); 160 0.29%	Nycole Turmel
Hull—Aylmer	Étienne Boulrice; 4,278; 7.72%	Nycole Turmel; 17,472; 31.52%	Greg Fergus; 28,478; 51.37%	Maude Chouinard-Boucher; 3,625; 6.54%	Roger Fleury; 1,035; 1.87%	Gabriel Girard-Bernier (M-L); 101 0.18%	Nycole Turmel
Hull—Aylmer	Étienne Boulrice; 4,278; 7.72%	Nycole Turmel; 17,472; 31.52%	Greg Fergus; 28,478; 51.37%	Maude Chouinard-Boucher; 3,625; 6.54%	Roger Fleury; 1,035; 1.87%	Sean J. Mulligan (CHP); 291 0.52%	Nycole Turmel
Laurentides—Labelle	Sylvain Charron; 6,209; 9.83%	Simon-Pierre Landry; 16,644; 26.35%	David Graham; 20,277; 32.10%	Johanne Régimbald; 18,792; 29.75%	Niloufar Hedjazi; 1,251; 1.98%		Marc-André Morin§
Mirabel	Gordon Ferguson; 6,020; 10.13%	Mylène Freeman; 17,873; 30.08%	Karl Trudel; 15,514; 26.11%	Simon Marcil; 18,710; 31.49%	Jocelyn Gifford; 1,301; 2.19%		New District
Pontiac	Benjamin Woodman; 8,716; 13.92%	Mathieu Ravignat; 14,090; 22.50%	William Amos; 34,154; 54.54%	Nicolas Lepage; 4,337; 6.93%	Colin Griffiths; 1,089; 1.74%	Louis Lang (M-L); 108 0.17%	Mathieu Ravignat
Pontiac	Benjamin Woodman; 8,716; 13.92%	Mathieu Ravignat; 14,090; 22.50%	William Amos; 34,154; 54.54%	Nicolas Lepage; 4,337; 6.93%	Colin Griffiths; 1,089; 1.74%	Pascal Médieu (SD); 131 0.21%	Mathieu Ravignat
Rivière-des-Mille-Îles	Érick Gauthier; 6,099; 10.51%	Laurin Liu; 17,111; 29.48%	Linda Lapointe; 18,787; 32.37%	Félix Pinel; 14,755; 25.42%	Alec Ware; 1,136; 1.96%	Luis Quinteros (Ind.); 158; 0.27%	Laurin Liu
Rivière-du-Nord	Romain Vignol; 4,793; 8.46%	Pierre Dionne Labelle; 17,077; 30.14%	Janice Bélair Rolland; 14,933; 26.36%	Rhéal Fortin; 18,157; 32.05%	Joey Leckman; 1,436; 2.53%	Fobozof A. Côté (Rhino.); 261; 0.46%	Pierre Dionne Labelle
Terrebonne	Michel Surprenant; 6,615; 11.35%	Charmaine Borg; 14,928; 25.61%	Michèle Audette; 16,316; 27.99%	Michel Boudrias; 19,238; 33.01%	Susan Moen; 1,016; 1.74%	Louis Clément Sénat (SD); 171; 0.29%	Charmaine Borg; Terrebonne—Blainville
Thérèse-De Blainville	Manuel Puga; 7,000; 12.44%	Alain Giguère; 14,022; 24.93%	Ramez Ayoub; 18,281; 32.50%	Alain Marginean; 15,238; 27.09%	Andrew Carkner; 1,352; 2.40%	Daniel Guindon (Libert.); 355; 0.63%	New District

== 2011 ==
Electoral district	Candidates						Incumbent
Electoral district	BQ	Conservative	Liberal	NDP	Green	Other	Incumbent
Abitibi—Baie-James— Nunavik—Eeyou	Yvon Lévesque; 5,615; 18.02%	Jean-Maurice Matte; 7,089; 22.74%	Léandre Gervais; 3,282; 10.53%	Romeo Saganash; 13,961; 44.79%	Johnny Kasudluak; 1,221; 3.92%		Yvon Lévesque
Abitibi—Témiscamingue	Marc Lemay; 15,258; 31.56%	Steven Hébert; 4,777; 9.88%	Suzie Grenon; 2,859; 5.91%	Christine Moore; 24,763; 51.22%	Patrick Rochon; 694; 1.44%		Marc Lemay
Argenteuil—Papineau— Mirabel	Mario Laframboise; 16,880; 28.96%	Yvan Patry; 6,497; 11.15%	Daniel Fox; 7,135; 12.24%	Mylène Freeman; 25,802; 44.27%	Stephen Matthews; 1,506; 2.58%	Christian-Simon Ferlatte (M-L); 117 0.20%	Mario Laframboise
Argenteuil—Papineau— Mirabel	Mario Laframboise; 16,880; 28.96%	Yvan Patry; 6,497; 11.15%	Daniel Fox; 7,135; 12.24%	Mylène Freeman; 25,802; 44.27%	Stephen Matthews; 1,506; 2.58%	Michel Daniel Guibord (Ind.); 342 0.59%	Mario Laframboise
Gatineau	Richard Nadeau; 8,619; 15.11%	Jennifer Gearey; 4,532; 7.95%	Steve MacKinnon; 7,975; 13.98%	Françoise Boivin; 35,262; 61.83%	Jonathan Meijer; 639; 1.12%		Richard Nadeau
Hull—Aylmer	Dino Lemay; 5,019; 8.44%	Nancy Brassard-Fortin; 6,058; 10.19%	Marcel Proulx; 12,051; 20.27%	Nycole Turmel; 35,194; 59.20%	Roger Fleury; 1,125; 1.89%		Marcel Proulx
Laurentides—Labelle	Johanne Deschamps; 17,799; 31.45%	Guy Joncas; 5,246; 9.27%	Jean-Marc Lacoste; 7,169; 12.67%	Marc-André Morin; 24,800; 43.83%	François Beauchamp; 1,423; 2.51%	Mikaël St-Louis (M-L); 149 0.26%	Johanne Deschamps
Pontiac	Maude Tremblay; 4,917; 10.05%	Lawrence Cannon; 14,441; 29.50%	Cindy Duncan McMillan; 6,242; 12.75%	Mathieu Ravignat; 22,376; 45.71%	Louis-Philippe Mayrand; 849; 1.73%	Benoit Legros (M-L); 124 0.25%	Lawrence Cannon
Rivière-des-Mille-Îles	Luc Desnoyers; 14,873; 28.55%	Lucie Leblanc; 5,057; 9.71%	Denis Joannette; 5,300; 10.17%	Laurin Liu; 25,639; 49.21%	Gilles Bisson; 1,229; 2.36%		Luc Desnoyers
Rivière-du-Nord	Monique Guay; 15,105; 28.21%	Sylvain Charron; 4,469; 8.35%	Jonathan Juteau; 3,400; 6.35%	Pierre Dionne Labelle; 29,603; 55.28%	René Piché; 972; 1.82%		Monique Guay
Terrebonne—Blainville	Diane Bourgeois; 17,663; 30.84%	Jean-Philippe Payment; 5,236; 9.14%	Robert Frégeau; 4,893; 8.54%	Charmaine Borg; 28,260; 49.34%	Michel Paulette; 1,219; 2.13%		Diane Bourgeois

=== Maps ===
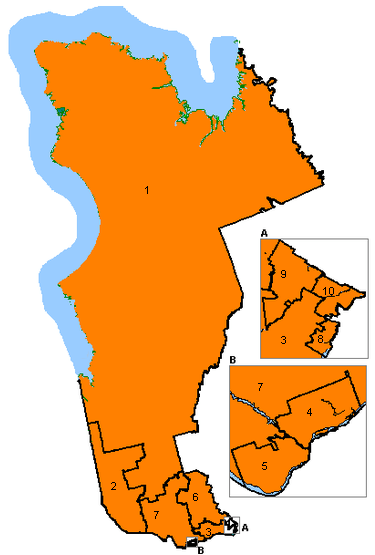
Map of the ridings in this region, coloured to identify the party they elected in the 2011 election

== 2008 ==
Electoral district	Candidates							Incumbent
Electoral district	BQ	Conservative	Liberal	NDP	Green	Marxist-Leninist	Independent	Incumbent
Abitibi—Baie-James— Nunavik—Eeyou	Yvon Lévesque; 10,995; 39.65%	Jean-Maurice Matte; 8,422; 30.37%	Mark Canada; 5,108; 18.42%	Erica Martin; 2,276; 8.21%	Patrick Rancourt; 928; 3.35%			Yvon Lévesque
Abitibi—Témiscamingue	Marc Lemay; 20,929; 47.91%	Pierre Grandmaitre; 8,267; 18.93%	Gilbert Barrette; 9,055; 20.73%	Christine Moore; 4,151; 9.50%	Bruno Côté; 976; 2.23%		Ghislain Loiselle; 302; 0.69%	Marc Lemay
Argenteuil—Papineau—Mirabel	Mario Laframboise; 26,455; 48.10%	Scott Pearce; 9,584; 17.43%	André Robert; 9,984; 18.15%	Alain Senécal; 6,819; 12.40%	Pierre Audette; 2,055; 3.74%	Christian-Simon Ferlatte; 98; 0.18%		Mario Laframboise
Gatineau	Richard Nadeau; 15,189; 29.15%	Denis Tassé; 8,762; 16.82%	Michel Simard; 13,193; 25.32%	Françoise Boivin; 13,612; 26.13%	David Inglis; 1,342; 2.58%			Richard Nadeau
Hull—Aylmer	Raphaël Déry; 11,625; 22.05%	Paul Fréchette; 7,996; 15.16%	Marcel Proulx; 19,750; 37.45%	Pierre Ducasse; 10,454; 19.83%	Frédéric Pouyot; 2,784; 5.28%	Gabriel Girard-Bernier; 121; 0.23%		Marcel Proulx
Laurentides—Labelle	Johanne Deschamps; 24,956; 47.08%	Guy Joncas; 6,914; 13.04%	Pierre Gfeller; 14,143; 26.68%	David Dupras; 4,896; 9.24%	Jacques Rigal; 2,094; 3.95%			Johanne Deschamps
Pontiac	Marius Tremblay; 9,576; 22.34%	Lawrence Cannon; 14,023; 32.71%	Cindy Duncan McMillan; 10,396; 24.25%	Céline Brault; 6,616; 15.43%	André Sylvestre; 2,148; 5.01%	Benoit Legros; 112; 0.26%		Lawrence Cannon
Rivière-des-Mille-Îles	Luc Desnoyers; 23,216; 45.68%	Claude Carignan; 9,911; 19.50%	Denis Joannette; 8,823; 17.36%	Normand Beaudet; 6,741; 13.26%	Marie Martine Bédard; 2,134; 4.20%			Gilles Perron†
Rivière-du-Nord	Monique Guay; 26,588; 53.57%	Gilles Duguay; 7,170; 14.45%	Joao Neves; 6,755; 13.61%	Simon Bernier; 7,187; 14.48%	René Piché; 1,656; 3.34%		Jocelyne Leduc; 273; 0.55%	Monique Guay
Terrebonne—Blainville	Diane Bourgeois; 28,303; 52.35%	Daniel Lebel; 7,551; 13.97%	Eva Nassif; 8,937; 16.53%	Michel Le Clair; 7,278; 13.46%	Martin Drapeau; 1,714; 3.17%		M. Zamboni Cadieux; 283; 0.52%	Diane Bourgeois

== 2006 ==
Electoral district	Candidates						Incumbent
Electoral district	BQ	Liberal	Conservative	NDP	Green	Marxist-Leninist	Incumbent
Abitibi—Baie-James— Nunavik—Eeyou	Yvon Lévesque; 13,928; 46.57%	Armand Caouette; 6,700; 22.40%	Gilles Gagnon; 6,261; 20.93%	Dominique Vaillancourt; 1,810; 6.05%	Pierre M. Denis; 1,210; 4.05%		Yvon Lévesque; Nunavik—Eeyou
Abitibi—Témiscamingue	Marc Lemay; 24,637; 52.34%	Charles Lavergne; 6,501; 13.81%	Marie-Josée Carbonneau; 10,634; 22.59%	Christine Moore; 4,022; 8.54%	Patrick Rancourt; 1,279; 2.72%		Marc Lemay
Argenteuil—Papineau—Mirabel	Mario Laframboise; 27,855; 52.13%	François-Hugues Liberge; 7,171; 13.42%	Suzanne Courville; 12,461; 23.32%	Alain Senécal; 3,466; 6.49%	Claude Sabourin; 2,480; 4.64%		Mario Laframboise; Argenteuil—Mirabel
Gatineau	Richard Nadeau; 21,093; 39.25%	Françoise Boivin; 16,826; 31.31%	Patrick Robert; 9,014; 16.77%	Anne Levesque; 5,354; 9.96%	Gail Walker; 1,456; 2.71%		Françoise Boivin
Hull—Aylmer	Alain Charette; 15,788; 29.35%	Marcel Proulx; 17,576; 32.67%	Gilles Poirier; 9,284; 17.26%	Pierre Laliberté; 8,334; 15.49%	Christian Doyle; 2,687; 4.99%	Gabriel Girard-Bernier; 125; 0.23%	Marcel Proulx
Laurentides—Labelle	Johanne Deschamps; 28,217; 53.82%	Jean-Pierre Fortin; 7,616; 14.53%	Jean-Serge Beauregard; 10,666; 20.35%	Rose-Aimée Auclair; 3,382; 6.45%	Richard Savignac; 2,543; 4.85%		Johanne Deschamps
Pontiac	Christine Émond Lapointe; 13,698; 28.71%	David Smith; 11,561; 24.23%	Lawrence Cannon; 16,069; 33.68%	Céline Brault; 4,759; 9.98%	Moe Garahan; 1,512; 3.17%	Benoit Legros; 107; 0.22%	David Smith
Rivière-des-Mille-Îles	Gilles-A. Perron; 26,272; 53.90%	Robert Frégeau; 6,239; 12.80%	Érick Gauthier; 10,173; 20.87%	Francis Chartrand; 3,418; 7.01%	Marie Martine Bédard; 2,643; 5.42%		Gilles Perron
Rivière-du-Nord	Monique Guay; 27,789; 59.08%	Yannick Guénette; 4,365; 9.28%	Pierre Albert; 9,769; 20.77%	Simon Bernier; 3,393; 7.21%	Maude Genet; 1,722; 3.66%		Monique Guay
Terrebonne—Blainville	Diane Bourgeois; 30,197; 59.17%	Maxime Thériault; 4,576; 8.97%	Daniel Lebel; 10,212; 20.01%	Michel Le Clair; 3,829; 7.50%	Martin Drapeau; 2,216; 4.34%		Diane Bourgeois

== 2004 ==
Electoral district	Candidates						Incumbent
Electoral district	Liberal	BQ	Conservative	NDP	Green	Other	Incumbent
Abitibi—Témiscamingue	Gilbert Barrette; 13,457; 30.98%	Marc Lemay; 25,041; 57.66%	Bernard Hugues Beauchesne; 2,425; 5.58%	Dennis Shushack; 1,472; 3.39%	Patrick Rancourt; 1,037; 2.39%		Gilbert Barrette; Témiscamingue
Argenteuil—Mirabel	Yves Sabourin; 13,214; 26.87%	Mario Laframboise; 28,228; 57.40%	David H. McArthur; 3,460; 7.04%	Elisabeth Clark; 1,493; 3.04%	Claude Sabourin; 2,510; 5.10%	Laurent Filion (CHP); 202 0.41%	Mario Laframboise; Argenteuil—Mirabel
Argenteuil—Mirabel	Yves Sabourin; 13,214; 26.87%	Mario Laframboise; 28,228; 57.40%	David H. McArthur; 3,460; 7.04%	Elisabeth Clark; 1,493; 3.04%	Claude Sabourin; 2,510; 5.10%	Michael O'Grady (M-L); 69 0.14%	Mario Laframboise; Argenteuil—Mirabel
Gatineau	Françoise Boivin; 19,198; 42.09%	Richard Nadeau; 18,368; 40.27%	Gérald Nicolas; 3,461; 7.59%	Dominique Vaillancourt; 2,610; 5.72%	Brian Gibb; 1,402; 3.07%	Gabriel Girard-Bernier (M-L); 125 0.27%	Mark Assad†
Gatineau	Françoise Boivin; 19,198; 42.09%	Richard Nadeau; 18,368; 40.27%	Gérald Nicolas; 3,461; 7.59%	Dominique Vaillancourt; 2,610; 5.72%	Brian Gibb; 1,402; 3.07%	Stephane Salko (Mar.); 453 0.99%	Mark Assad†
Hull—Aylmer	Marcel Proulx; 20,135; 41.87%	Alain Charette; 15,626; 32.49%	Pierrette Bellefeuille; 3,963; 8.24%	Pierre Laliberté; 5,709; 11.87%	Gail Walker; 2,561; 5.33%	Christian Legeais (M-L); 98; 0.20%	Marcel Proulx
Laurentides—Labelle	Dominique Boyer; 14,459; 29.43%	Johanne Deschamps; 28,675; 58.38%	Guillaume Desjardins; 2,887; 5.88%	Brendan Naef; 1,320; 2.69%	Jacques Léger; 1,781; 3.63%		new district
Nunavik—Eeyou	Guy St-Julien; 12,006; 43.17%	Yvon Lévesque; 12,578; 45.23%	François Dionne; 1,265; 4.55%	Pierre Corbeil; 1,097; 3.94%	Martin Fournier; 862; 3.10%		Guy St-Julien; Abitibi—Baie-James—Nunavik
Pontiac	David Smith; 15,358; 38.36%	L-Hubert Leduc; 11,685; 29.19%	Judith Grant; 8,869; 22.15%	Gretchen Schwarz; 2,317; 5.79%	Thierry Vicente; 1,673; 4.18%	Benoit Legros (M-L); 132; 0.33%	Robert Bertrand§ Pontiac—Gatineau—Labelle
Rivière-des-Mille-Îles	Yolaine Savignac; 11,025; 24.18%	Gilles-A. Perron; 27,993; 61.39%	Érick Gauthier; 3,064; 6.72%	Nicolas Du Cap; 1,559; 3.42%	Marie Martine Bédard; 1,961; 4.30%		Gilles-A. Perron
Rivière-du-Nord	Lorraine Auclair; 9,509; 21.60%	Monique Guay; 29,204; 66.33%	Catherine Brousseau; 2,435; 5.53%	François Côté; 1,290; 2.93%	Marcel Poirier; 1,129; 2.56%	Christian Marcoux (Mar.); 459; 1.04%	Monique Guay; Laurentides
Terrebonne—Blainville	Pierre Gingras; 9,048; 19.70%	Diane Bourgeois; 31,288; 68.13%	Patrick Légaré; 2,582; 5.62%	Normand Beaudet; 1,451; 3.16%	Martin Drapeau; 1,554; 3.38%		Diane Bourgeois

=== Maps ===
1. Abitibi-Témiscamingue
2. Argenteuil-Mirabel
3. Gatineau
4. Hull-Aylmer
5. Laurentides-Labelle
6. Nunavik-Eeyou
7. Pontiac
8. Rivière-des-Mille-Îles
9. Rivière-du-Nord
10. Terrebonne-Blainville
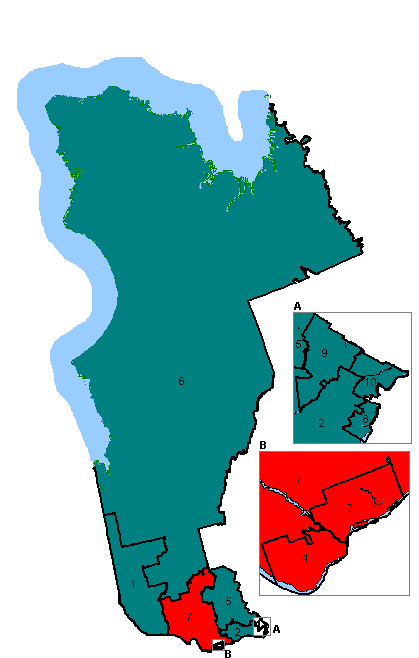
Key map

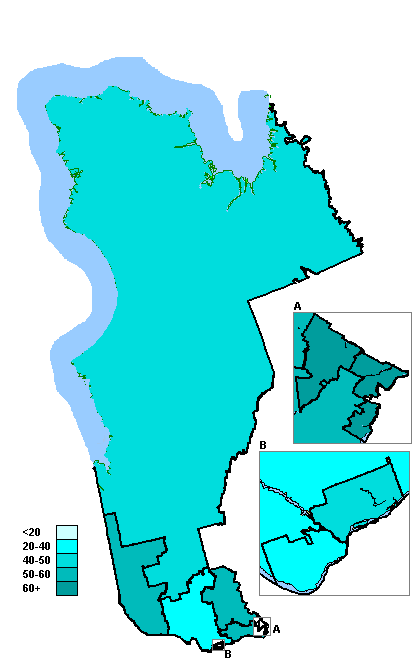
Bloc Québécois

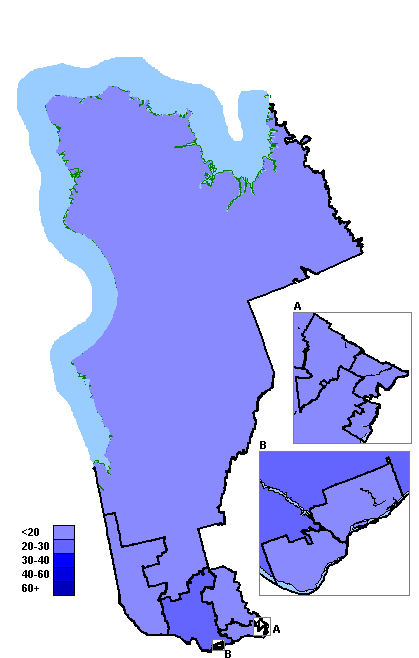
Conservative Party of Canada

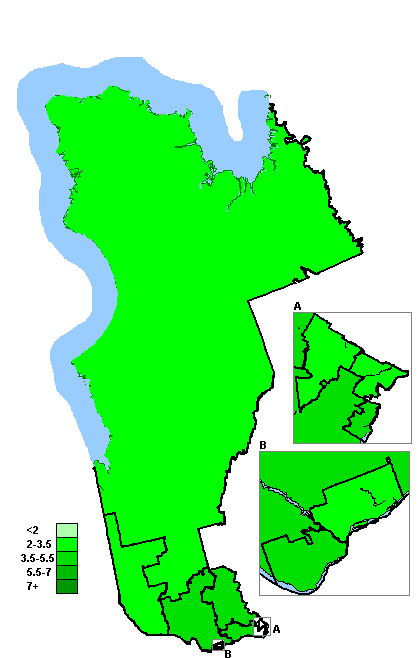
Green Party of Canada

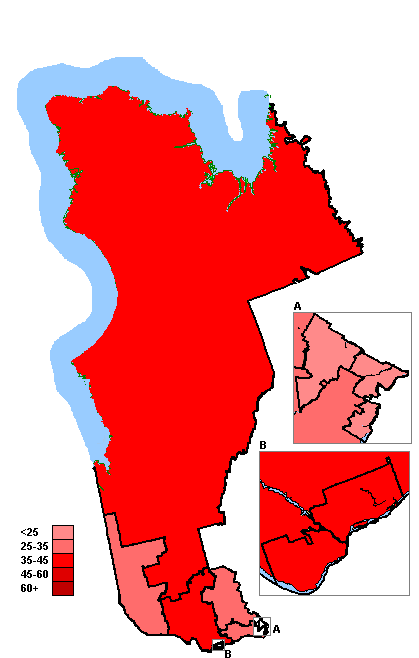
Liberal Party of Canada

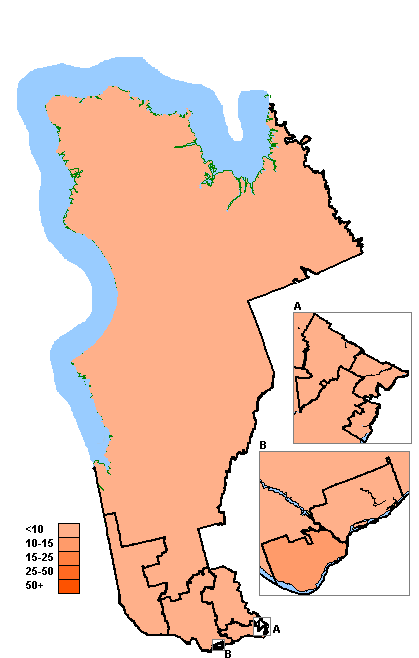
New Democratic Party

== 2000 ==
Electoral district	Candidates								Incumbent
Electoral district	BQ	Liberal	Canadian Alliance	NDP	PC	Natural Law	No Affiliation	Other	Incumbent
Abitibi—Baie-James—Nunavik	François Lemieux; 15,567; 42.76%	Guy St-Julien; 18,198; 49.99%	François Dionne; 1,297; 3.56%	Daniel Fredrick; 534; 1.47%	Sylvain Gemme; 809; 2.22%				Guy St-Julien; Abitibi
Argenteuil—Papineau—Mirabel	Mario Laframboise; 21,713; 43.20%	Lise Bourgault; 21,171; 42.12%	Francine Labelle; 2,897; 5.76%	Didier Charles; 550; 1.09%	Jean-Denis Pelletier; 1,848; 3.68%	Marie-Thérèse Nault; 256; 0.51%	Laurent Filion; 167; 0.33%	Pierre Audette (Mar.); 934 1.86% Gilles Bisson (Green); 723 1.44%	Maurice Dumas; Argenteuil—Papineau
Gatineau	Richard Nadeau; 12,817; 25.40%	Mark Assad; 25,960; 51.45%	Stéphany Crowley; 5,069; 10.05%	Carl Hétu; 1,763; 3.49%	Michael F. Vasseur; 3,619; 7.17%	Jean-Claude Pommet; 472; 0.94%	Ronald Bélanger (Ind.); 389 0.77% Samantha Demers; 228 0.45%	Françoise Roy (M-L); 139; 0.28%	Mark Assad
Hull—Aylmer	Caroline Brouard; 10,051; 23.08%	Marcel Proulx; 22,385; 51.40%	Michel Geisterfer; 3,639; 8.36%	Peter Piening; 1,521; 3.49%	Guy Dufort; 4,181; 9.60%	Rita Bouchard; 426; 0.98%	Ron Gray; 184; 0.42%	Robert Brooks (CAP); 167 0.38% Alexandre Legeais (M-L); 106 0.24% Aubert Martins (Mar.); 892 2.05%	Marcel Proulx
Laurentides	Monique Guay; 30,337; 49.90%	Dominique Boyer; 23,619; 38.85%	William Azeff; 2,269; 3.73%	Brendan Naef; 720; 1.18%	Jacques Vien; 3,094; 5.09%	Jacinthe Millaire; 757; 1.25%			Monique Guay
Pontiac—Gatineau—Labelle	Johanne Deschamps; 14,552; 32.06%	Robert Bertrand; 20,590; 45.36%	Judith Grant; 6,587; 14.51%	Melissa Hunter; 840; 1.85%	Benoit Larocque; 1,791; 3.95%	Eleanor Hyodo; 184; 0.41%	Thomas J. Sabourin; 98; 0.22%	Christian Legeais (M-L); 93 0.20% Gretchen Schwarz (Green); 654 1.44%	Robert Bertrand
Rivière-des-Mille-Îles	Gilles-A. Perron; 26,508; 49.41%	Robert Fragasso; 18,456; 34.40%	François Desrochers; 3,677; 6.85%	Stephane Thinel; 739; 1.38%	Jonathan Paquette; 2,935; 5.47%			Eric Squire (Green); 1,329; 2.48%	Gilles Perron; Saint-Eustache—Sainte-Thérèse
Témiscamingue	Pierre Brien; 18,801; 50.14%	Roch Charron; 16,028; 42.75%	Eric Larochelle; 1,368; 3.65%	Anik-Maude Morin; 493; 1.31%	Sébastien Héroux; 804; 2.14%				Pierre Brien
Terrebonne—Blainville	Diane Bourgeois; 28,933; 51.91%	François-Hugues Liberge; 17,668; 31.70%	Guylaine St-Georges; 3,741; 6.71%	Normand Beaudet; 1,111; 1.99%	Mélanie Gemme; 3,089; 5.54%	Pascale Levert; 1,193; 2.14%			Paul Mercier

== 1997 ==
Electoral district	Candidates						Incumbent
Electoral district	BQ	Liberal	PC	NDP	Natural Law	Other	Incumbent
Abitibi	Jeannot Couture; 14,168	Guy St-Julien; 16,803	Armand Caouette; 6,531	Claudette Paquin; 909			Bernard Deshaies
Argenteuil—Papineau	Maurice Dumas; 21,202	Stéphane Hébert; 17,648	André Robert; 11,171	Didier Charles; 836	Marie-Thérèse Nault; 509	Laurent Filion (CHP); 505	Maurice Dumas
Gatineau	Christian Picard; 11,391	Mark Assad; 25,298	Richard Côté; 15,786	Michelle Bonner; 982	Jean-Claude Pommet; 448	Claude Grant (CHP); 445; Françoise Roy (M-L); 150	Mark Assad; Gatineau—La Lièvre
Hull—Aylmer	Ginette Tétreault; 9,922	Marcel Massé; 25,835	Stéphane Rondeau; 8,461	Peter Piening; 1,317	Robert Mayer; 266	Camille Fortin (Reform); 935; Gail Walker (Green); 586; Ron Gray (CHP); 275; Pierre Soublière (M-L); 151	Marcel Massé
Laurentides	Monique Guay; 28,649	Paul-André Forget; 19,053	Jacques Vien; 14,096	David Rovins; 844			Monique Guay
Pontiac—Gatineau—Labelle	Robert Coulombe; 15,897	Robert Bertrand; 22,736	Pierre Miller; 9,187	Brenda Lee; 1,097	Marc Lacroix; 479	Thomas Sabourin (CHP); 269	Robert Bertrand
Saint-Eustache—Sainte-Thérèse	Gilles Perron; 25,806	Yolaine Savignac; 16,280	Jean Blanchard; 12,522	Valérie Kinslow; 947			New district
Témiscamingue	Pierre Brien; 18,528	Nora Bélanger-Teed; 12,678	Denis Pilon; 7,879	Anik-Maude Morin; 654			Pierre Brien
Terrebonne—Blainville	Paul Mercier; 28,066	Marcel Therrien; 14,687	Dominic Dupuis; 11,883	Colette Bouchard; 1,090			Benoît Sauvageau; Terrebonne
Terrebonne—Blainville	Paul Mercier; 28,066	Marcel Therrien; 14,687	Dominic Dupuis; 11,883	Colette Bouchard; 1,090			Merged districts
Terrebonne—Blainville	Paul Mercier; 28,066	Marcel Therrien; 14,687	Dominic Dupuis; 11,883	Colette Bouchard; 1,090			Paul Mercier; Blainville—Deux-Montagnes

== 1993 ==
Electoral district	Candidates					Incumbent
Electoral district	BQ	Liberal	PC	NDP	Other	Incumbent
Abitibi	Bernard Deshaies; 18,876	Lucie Blais; 6,666	Guy St-Julien; 14,651	Louise Cloutier; 951		Guy St-Julien
Argenteuil—Papineau	Maurice Dumas; 21,202	Jacques Desforges; 14,234	Lise Bourgault; 10,959	Jean G. Drapeau; 888		Lise Bourgault
Blainville—Deux-Montagnes	Paul Mercier; 47,931	Pierre Brien; 18,830	Monique Landry; 11,823	Jean-Paul Rioux; 853	Linda Légaré-St-Cyr (NL); 1,009; Richard Kirkman Kendall (Libert); 498; Gisèle Ray (PfC); 115	Monique Landry
Gatineau—La Lièvre	Jules Fournier; 25,006	Mark Assad; 39,274	Jérôme P. Falardeau; 4,464	Elizabeth Holden; 1,096	Danièle Bélair (NL); 736; Nicole Leblanc (M-L); 200	Mark Assad
Hull—Aylmer	Gilles Rocheleau; 14,293	Marcel Massé; 27,988	Pierre Chénier; 3,244	Francine Bourque; 1,346	George Halpern (Green); 466; Robert Mayer (NL); 401; Françoise Roy (M-L); 163; Linda Dubois (Abol); 63	Gilles Rocheleau (Note: Gilles Rocheleau was elected as a Liberal in 1988 election but left the Liberal caucus in 1990 to seat as an independent MP and joined the Bloc Québécois caucus later in 1990.)
Laurentides	Monique Guay; 28,649	Michelle Tisseyre; 18,716	Jacques Vien; 7,059	Patricia Houle; 815	Gilles Gervais (PfC); 484	Jacques Vien
Pontiac—Gatineau—Labelle	Claude Radermaker; 14,554	Robert Bertrand; 17,377	Barry Moore; 9,593	Nicole Des Roches; 692	Brian Corriveau (Nat); 755; Glen Emmett Patrick Kealey (Ind); 402	Barry Moore
Témiscamingue	Pierre Brien; 22,555	Gilles Héroux; 9,246	Gabriel Desjardins; 7,806		Grégoire Deguire (Nat); 530; Célyne Ayotte (Abol); 300	Gabriel Desjardins
Terrebonne	Benoît Sauvageau; 56,235	Claire Brouillet; 14,623	Jean-Marc Robitaille; 9,496	Renée-Claude Lorimier; 873	Christian Chouery (PfC); 445	Jean-Marc Robitaille

== 1988 ==
Parties	1st	2nd	3rd	4th
Progressive Conservative	7	2	0	0
Liberal	2	5	2	0
New Democratic	0	2	6	1
Independent	0	0	1	0

Electoral district	Candidates					Incumbent
Electoral district	Liberal	PC	NDP	Rhinoceros	Other	Incumbent
Abitibi	Normand Michaud; 6,251	Guy St-Julien; 22,254	Gerry Lemoyne; 10,161			Guy St-Julien
Argenteuil—Papineau	Peter Georgakakos; 11,088	Lise Bourgault; 23,076	André Marc Paré; 5,772	Michel Le Whip Paré; 959		Lise Bourgault
Blainville—Deux-Montagnes	Zsolt Pogany; 13,787	Monique Landry; 40,810	Louisette Tremblay-Hinton; 9,243	Gilles Libellule Lehoux; 1,782	Gilles Gervais (PfC); 150	Monique Landry
Gatineau—La Lièvre	Mark Assad; 23,507	Claudy Mailly; 21,385	Marius Tremblay; 8,394	Daniel Le Lièvre Villeneuve; 660	Nicole Leblanc (Ind.); 364	Claudy Mailly; Gatineau
Hull—Aylmer	Gilles Rocheleau; 23,218	Nicole Moreault; 14,849	Danielle Lapointe-Vienneau; 7,170	Denis Le Citron Patenaude (Rhino); 661	Glen Kealey (Ind); 559; Serge Lafortune (Ind); 134	Gaston Isabelle
Laurentides	Serge Paquette; 15,752	Jacques Vien; 31,000	Bill Clay; 7,755	Denis Le Citron Patenaude; 1,408	Jean Vigneault (PfC); 249	Fernand Ladouceur; Labelle
Pontiac—Gatineau—Labelle	Brian Murphy; 11,589	Barry Moore; 20,522	John Trent; 6,207			Barry Moore
Témiscamingue	Laurent Guertin; 5,843	Gabriel Desjardins; 19,106	Rémy Trudel; 15,623	Jean Ouellet; 712		Gabriel Desjardins
Terrebonne	Claire Brouillet; 12,422	Jean-Marc Robitaille; 35,345	Lauraine Vaillancourt; 7,194	Alain Cowboy De Lagrave; 1,647	Robert Toupin (Ind.); 10,390	Robert Toupin (Note: Robert Toupin was elected as a Progressive Conservative in the 1984 election but left the PC caucus in 1986 to seat with the NDP. He left the NPD caucus in 1987 and sat as an independent until the 1988 election.)

== 1984 ==
Electoral district	Candidates						Incumbent
Electoral district	Liberal	PC	NDP	Rhinoceros	Parti nationaliste	Other	Incumbent
Abitibi	René Gingras; 12,525	Guy St-Julien; 23,230	Royal Tremblay; 3,583	Robert Hamelin; 2,264	Georges Caron; 1,925	Alphonse Leduc (SC); 1,179	René Gingras
Argenteuil—Papineau	Robert Gourd; 12,096	Lise Bourgault; 21,105	Bjorn L. Johansson; 2,671	Claude Sam Sabourin; 946	François Granger; 566	Alphonse J. Bélec (Ind); 350	Robert Gourd; Argenteuil
Blainville—Deux-Montagnes	Francis Fox; 23,732	Monique Landry; 28,863	Normand J. Labrie; 5,609	Réjean O. Lafrenière; 1,558	Daniel Epinat; 1,032	Sylvie Houle (SC); 255; Charles C. Chiasson (Ind); 113; Sylvain G. Pelchat (PfC); 58; Katy S. Le Rougetel (Ind); 26	Francis Fox
Gatineau	René Cousineau; 17,496	Claudy Mailly; 25,873	Sylvie Rossignol; 6,543		Jean Scuvée; 766	Jean-Guy Méthot (PfC); 142	René Cousineau
Hull—Aylmer	Gaston Isabelle; 17,058	Pierre Ménard; 15,563	Jacques Audette; 8,247		Carol Anctil; 1,015	Émile Chartrand (PfC); 156	Gaston Isabelle; Hull
Labelle	Claude Hotte; 14,465	Fernand Ladouceur; 28,286	Marc Péclet; 4,670	Jacques Coco Miron; 1,567	Adrien Grégoire; 1,546	Albert Pouliot (SC); 274; Denis Tremblay (PfC); 84	Maurice Dupras
Pontiac—Gatineau—Labelle	Elizabeth Dickson; 10,025	Barry Moore; 21,754	Paul Rowland; 2,667		Dominique Dealbuquerque; 524	Donna Craig-Méthot (PfC); 141	Thomas Lefebvre
Témiscamingue	Henri Tousignant; 13,756	Gabriel Desjardins; 20,347	Guy Verville; 2,189	Marcel Yves Bégin; 1,457	Roberte Parent; 2,126	Rachel Lord (SC); 626	Henri Tousignant
Terrebonne	Joseph-Roland Comtois; 19,040	Robert Toupin; 43,822	Brian Umansky; 6,454		Jean A. Bonin; 3,060	Claude Brosseau (PfC); 292	Joseph-Roland Comtois

== 1980 ==
Electoral district	Candidates					Incumbent
Electoral district	Liberal	PC	NDP	Social Credit	Other	Incumbent
Abitibi	René Gingras; 22,050	Marius Gauthier; 1,982	Royal Tremblay; 2,553	Armand Caouette; 14,881	1,724	Armand Caouette
Argenteuil	Robert Gourd; 21,976	Benoit Parent; 5,128	Ida Brown; 2,422	Maurice Marcoux; 1,074	1,433	Robert Gourd
Blainville—Deux-Montagnes	Francis Fox; 35,979	François de Sales Robert; 3,448	Normand Labrie; 5,460	Carmen Paquin-Houle; 1,699	2,029	Francis Fox
Gatineau	René Cousineau; 35,437	Jean-Pierre Plouffe; 3,134	Renée Pierre Brisson; 4,792	Marcelle Cormier; 975	748	René Cousineau
Hull	Gaston Isabelle; 27,938	Ronald Lefebvre; 2,167	Michel Légère; 10,059		842	Gaston Isabelle
Labelle	Maurice Dupras; 29,488	Marcel Masse; 9,829	Willie Kofman; 2,858		2,137	Maurice Dupras
Pontiac—Gatineau—Labelle	Thomas Lefebvre; 21,605	André Benoit; 5,151	Jean-Pierre Paillet; 2,813		1,125	Thomas Lefebvre
Témiscamingue	Henri Tousignant; 22,031	Bernard Martel; 1,886	Marc Lord; 1,586	Roger Bureau; 8,653	1,948	Henri Tousignant
Terrebonne	Joseph-Roland Comtois; 36,089	Jacques Dupuis; 4,807	Gilles Bertrand; 6,917	Georgette Grenier; 2,839	2,208	Joseph-Roland Comtois

== 1979 ==
Electoral district	Candidates					Incumbent
Electoral district	Liberal	Social Credit	PC	NDP	Other	Incumbent
Abitibi	Ronald Tetrault; 15,697	Armand Caouette; 21,387	Jean-Jacques Martel; 5,652	Maurice Vaney; 1,420	2,988	Gérard Laprise; Abitibi
Abitibi	Ronald Tetrault; 15,697	Armand Caouette; 21,387	Jean-Jacques Martel; 5,652	Maurice Vaney; 1,420	2,988	merged districts
Abitibi	Ronald Tetrault; 15,697	Armand Caouette; 21,387	Jean-Jacques Martel; 5,652	Maurice Vaney; 1,420	2,988	Armand Caouette; Villeneuve
Argenteuil	Robert Gourd; 22,043	Antoine Bedard; 3,780	George Kirby; 5,889	Thérèse Gardner Pelletier; 1,576	1,009	New district
Blainville—Deux-Montagnes	Francis Fox; 34,885	Carmen Paquin-Houle; 5,972	François de Sales Robert; 5,042	Normand Labrie; 3,472	1,852	Francis Fox; Argenteuil—Deux-Montagnes
Gatineau	René Cousineau; 34,234	Gérard Croteau; 6,206	René Bergeron; 3,174	André Beaudry; 3,292	716	Gaston Clermont
Hull	Gaston Isabelle; 30,413	Jean Tessier; 2,357	Jean-Paul St-Amand; 2,320	Michel Légère; 7,175	1,073	Gaston Isabelle
Labelle	Maurice Dupras; 29,614	Jean Léveillé; 6,580	Guy Racicot; 6,073	Willie Kofman; 2,134	665	Maurice Dupras
Pontiac—Gatineau—Labelle	Thomas Lefebvre; 20,253	Rita Jones; 3,084	Sant Singh; 5,851	Ida Brown; 1,682	892	Thomas Lefebvre; Pontiac
Témiscamingue	Henri Tousignant; 16,147	Gilles Caouette; 15,295	Normand Grimard; 4,659	Germain Boudreau; 1,473	1,502	Gilles Caouette (Note: Gilles Caouette was elected in a by-election on 24 June 1977 following the death on 16 December 1976 of his father, Réal Caouette, who had held the seat since 1968.)
Terrebonne	Joseph-Roland Comtois; 34,839	Georgette Grenier; 10,239	Louis-Rhéal Tremblay; 5,845	Roland Francis; 3,114	1,890	Joseph-Roland Comtois
