= List of MPs who lost their seat in the 1993 Canadian federal election =

This is a list of MPs that lost their seat at the 1993 Canadian federal election. In total 132 MPs were defeated for re-election, many by the recently founded Bloc Québécois and the Reform Party.

== Breakdown ==
| Party | MPs defeated |
| Progressive Conservative | 100 |
| New Democrat | 29 |
| Independents | 3 |

== Progressive Conservative ==
| Party | Name | Constituency | Province | Office held whilst in Parliament | Year elected | Defeated by | Party |
|---|---|---|---|---|---|---|---|
| Progressive Conservative Party | Ken Atkinson | St. Catharines | Ontario | | 1988 | Walt Lastewka | Liberal |
| Progressive Conservative Party | Bill Attewell | Markham—Whitchurch—Stouffville | Ontario | | 1984 | Jag Bhaduria | Liberal |
| Progressive Conservative Party | Perrin Beatty | Wellington—Grey—Dufferin—Simcoe | Ontario | Secretary of State for External Affairs (1993) | 1972 | Murray Calder | Liberal |
| Progressive Conservative Party | Ross Belsher | Fraser Valley East | British Columbia | | 1984 | Chuck Strahl | Reform |
| Progressive Conservative Party | Bud Bird | Fredericton—York—Sunbury | New Brunswick | | 1989 | Andy Scott | Liberal |
| Progressive Conservative Party | David Bjornson | Selkirk—Red River | Manitoba | | 1988 | Ron Fewchuk | Liberal |
| Progressive Conservative Party | Jean-Pierre Blackburn | Jonquière | Quebec | | 1984 | André Caron | Bloc Québécois |
| Progressive Conservative Party | Pierre Blais | Bellechasse | Quebec | President of the Privy Council (1993) Minister of Justice and Attorney General (1993) | 1984 | François Langlois | Bloc Québécois |
| Progressive Conservative Party | Don Blenkarn | Mississauga South | Ontario | | 1979 | Paul Szabo | Liberal |
| Progressive Conservative Party | John Bosley | Don Valley West | Ontario | Speaker of the House of Commons of Canada (1984–1986) | 1979 | John Godfrey | Liberal |
| Progressive Conservative Party | Lise Bourgault | Argenteuil—Papineau | Quebec | | 1984 | Maurice Dumas | Bloc Québécois |
| Progressive Conservative Party | Patrick Boyer | Etobicoke—Lakeshore | Ontario | | 1984 | Jean Augustine | Liberal |
| Progressive Conservative Party | Harry Brightwell | Perth—Wellington—Waterloo | Ontario | | 1984 | John Richardson | Liberal |
| Progressive Conservative Party | Pauline Browes | Scarborough Centre | Ontario | | 1984 | John Cannis | Liberal |
| Progressive Conservative Party | Kim Campbell | Vancouver Centre | British Columbia | Prime Minister of Canada (1993) | 1988 | Hedy Fry | Liberal |
| Progressive Conservative Party | Murray Cardiff | Huron—Bruce | Ontario | | 1980 | Paul Steckle | Liberal |
| Progressive Conservative Party | Bill Casey | Cumberland—Colchester | Nova Scotia | | 1988 | Dianne Brushett | Liberal |
| Progressive Conservative Party | Harry Chadwick | Bramalea—Gore—Malton | Ontario | | 1988 | Gurbax Malhi | Liberal |
| Progressive Conservative Party | Michel Champagne | Champlain | Quebec | | 1984 | Réjean Lefebvre | Bloc Québécois |
| Progressive Conservative Party | Andrée Champagne | Saint-Hyacinthe—Bagot | Quebec | Deputy Speaker of the House of Commons (1990–1993) | 1984 | Yvan Loubier | Bloc Québécois |
| Progressive Conservative Party | Lee Clark | Brandon—Souris | Manitoba | | 1983 | Glen McKinnon | Liberal |
| Progressive Conservative Party | John E. Cole | York—Simcoe | Ontario | | 1988 | Karen Kraft Sloan | Liberal |
| Progressive Conservative Party | Mary Collins | Capilano—Howe Sound | British Columbia | Minister of Health and Welfare (1993) | 1984 | Herb Grubel | Reform |
| Progressive Conservative Party | Jean Corbeil | Anjou—Rivière-des-Prairies | Quebec | Minister of Transport (1991–1993) | 1988 | Roger Pomerleau | Bloc Québécois |
| Progressive Conservative Party | Robert Corbett | Fundy—Royal | New Brunswick | | 1978 | Paul Zed | Liberal |
| Progressive Conservative Party | Yvon Coté | Richmond—Wolfe | Quebec | | 1988 | Gaston Leroux | Bloc Québécois |
| Progressive Conservative Party | Clément Couture | Saint-Jean | Quebec | | 1988 | Claude Bachand | Bloc Québécois |
| Progressive Conservative Party | John Crosbie | St. John's West | Newfoundland | Minister of Fisheries and Oceans (1991–1993) | 1976 | Jean Payne | Liberal |
| Progressive Conservative Party | Charles Deblois | Beauport—Montmorency—Orléans | Quebec | | 1988 | Michel Guimond | Bloc Québécois |
| Progressive Conservative Party | Vincent Della Noce | Laval East | Quebec | | 1984 | Maud Debien | Bloc Québécois |
| Progressive Conservative Party | Gabriel Desjardins | Témiscamingue | Quebec | | 1984 | Pierre Brien | Bloc Québécois |
| Progressive Conservative Party | Paul Dick | Lanark—Carleton | Ontario | Minister of Public Works (1993) | 1972 | Ian Murray | Liberal |
| Progressive Conservative Party | Dorothy Dobbie | Winnipeg South | Manitoba | | 1988 | Reg Alcock | Liberal |
| Progressive Conservative Party | Bill Domm | Peterborough | Ontario | | 1979 | Peter Adams | Liberal |
| Progressive Conservative Party | Murray Dorin | Edmonton Northwest | Alberta | | 1984 | Anne McLellan | Reform |
| Progressive Conservative Party | Suzanne Duplessis | Louis-Hébert | Quebec | | 1984 | Philippe Paré | Bloc Québécois |
| Progressive Conservative Party | Jim Edwards | Edmonton Southwest | Alberta | President of the Treasury Board (1993) | 1984 | Ian Mcclelland | Reform |
| Progressive Conservative Party | Doug Fee | Red Deer | Alberta | | 1988 | Bob Mills | Reform |
| Progressive Conservative Party | Louise Feltham | Wild Rose | Alberta | | 1988 | Myron Thompson | Reform |
| Progressive Conservative Party | Marc Ferland | Portneuf | Quebec | | 1984 | Pierre de Savoye | Bloc Québécois |
| Progressive Conservative Party | Marie Gibeau | Bourassa | Quebec | | 1988 | Osvaldo Núñez | Bloc Québécois |
| Progressive Conservative Party | Darryl Gray | Bonaventure—Îles-de-la-Madeleine | Quebec | | 1984 | Patrick Gagnon | Liberal |
| Progressive Conservative Party | Barbara Greene | Don Valley North | Ontario | | 1988 | Sarkis Assadourian | Liberal |
| Progressive Conservative Party | Jean-Guy Guilbault | Drummond | Quebec | | 1984 | Pauline Picard | Bloc Québécois |
| Progressive Conservative Party | André Harvey | Chicoutimi | Quebec | Parliamentary Secretary to the Prime Minister (1993) | 1984 | Gilbert Fillion | Bloc Québécois |
| Progressive Conservative Party | Jim Hawkes | Calgary West | Alberta | | 1979 | Stephen Harper | Reform |
| Progressive Conservative Party | Tom Hockin | London West | Ontario | | 1984 | Sue Barnes | Liberal |
| Progressive Conservative Party | Jean-Pierre Hogue | Outremont | Quebec | | 1988 | Martin Cauchon | Liberal |
| Progressive Conservative Party | Felix Holtmann | Portage—Interlake | Manitoba | | 1984 | Jon Gerrard | Liberal |
| Progressive Conservative Party | Robert Horner | Mississauga West | Ontario | Chair of the Standing Committee on Justice | 1984 | Carolyn Parrish | Liberal |
| Progressive Conservative Party | Al Horning | Okanagan Centre | British Columbia | | 1988 | Werner Schmidt | Reform |
| Progressive Conservative Party | Ken Hughes | Macleod | Alberta | | 1988 | Grant Hill | Reform |
| Progressive Conservative Party | Ken James | Sarnia—Lambton | Ontario | | 1984 | Roger Gallaway | Liberal |
| Progressive Conservative Party | Al Johnson | Calgary North | Alberta | | 1988 | Diane Ablonczy | Reform |
| Progressive Conservative Party | Jean-Luc Joncas | Matapédia—Matane | Quebec | | 1984 | René Canuel | Bloc Québécois |
| Progressive Conservative Party | Fernand Jourdenais | La Prairie | Quebec | | 1984 | Richard Bélisle | Bloc Québécois |
| Progressive Conservative Party | Allan Koury | Hochelaga—Maisonneuve | Quebec | | 1988 | Réal Ménard | Bloc Québécois |
| Progressive Conservative Party | Monique Landry | Blainville—Deux-Montagnes | Quebec | Minister of Communications (1993) | 1984 | Paul Mercier | Bloc Québécois |
| Progressive Conservative Party | Charles Langlois | Manicouagan | Quebec | | 1988 | Bernard St-Laurent | Bloc Québécois |
| Progressive Conservative Party | Gaby Larrivée | Joliette | Quebec | | 1988 | René Laurin | Bloc Québécois |
| Progressive Conservative Party | Doug Lewis | Simcoe North | Ontario | | 1979 | Paul Devillers | Liberal |
| Progressive Conservative Party | Gilles Loiselle | Québec | Quebec | Minister of Finance (1993) | 1988 | Christiane Gagnon | Bloc Québécois |
| Progressive Conservative Party | Ricardo López | Chateauguay | Quebec | | 1984 | Maurice Godin | Bloc Québécois |
| Progressive Conservative Party | David MacDonald | Rosedale | Ontario | | 1988 | Bill Graham | Liberal |
| Progressive Conservative Party | Charles-Eugène Marin | Gaspé | Quebec | | 1984 | Yvan Bernier | Bloc Québécois |
| Progressive Conservative Party | Charlie Mayer | Lisgar—Marquette | Manitoba | Minister of Agriculture (1993) | 1979 | Jake Hoeppner | Reform |
| Progressive Conservative Party | Peter McCreath | South Shore | Nova Scotia | | 1988 | Derek Wells | Liberal |
| Progressive Conservative Party | Ken Monteith | Elgin—Norfolk | Ontario | | 1988 | Gar Knutson | Liberal |
| Progressive Conservative Party | Barry Moore | Pontiac—Gatineau—Labelle | Quebec | | 1984 | Robert Bertrand | Liberal |
| Progressive Conservative Party | Rob Nicholson | Niagara Falls | Ontario | | 1984 | Gary Pillitteri | Liberal |
| Progressive Conservative Party | Brian O'Kurley | Elk Island | Alberta | | 1988 | Ken Epp | Reform |
| Progressive Conservative Party | André Plourde | Kamouraska—Rivière-du-Loup | Quebec | | 1984 | André Plourde | Bloc Québécois |
| Progressive Conservative Party | Alan Redway | Don Valley East | Ontario | | 1988 | David Collenette | Liberal |
| Progressive Conservative Party | Ross Reid | St. John's East | Newfoundland | Minister of Fisheries and Oceans (1993) | 1988 | Bonnie Hickey | Liberal |
| Progressive Conservative Party | John Reimer | Kitchener | Ontario | | 1984 | John English | Liberal |
| Progressive Conservative Party | Guy Ricard | Laval West | Quebec | | 1984 | Michel Dupuy | Liberal |
| Progressive Conservative Party | Lee Richardson | Calgary Southeast | Alberta | | 1988 | Jan Brown | Reform |
| Progressive Conservative Party | Jean-Marc Robitaille | Terrebonne | Quebec | | 1988 | Benoît Sauvageau | Bloc Québécois |
| Progressive Conservative Party | Nicole Roy-Arcelin | Ahuntsic | Quebec | | 1988 | Michel Daviault | Bloc Québécois |
| Progressive Conservative Party | Larry Schneider | Regina—Wascana | Saskatchewan | Minister of Western Economic Diversification (1993) | 1988 | Ralph Goodale | Liberal |
| Progressive Conservative Party | Jack Shields | Athabasca | Alberta | | 1980 | David Chatters | Reform |
| Progressive Conservative Party | Tom Siddon | Richmond | British Columbia | Minister of Indian Affairs and Northern Development | 1978 | Raymond Chan | Liberal |
| Progressive Conservative Party | Pat Sobeski | Cambridge | Ontario | | 1988 | Janko Peric | Liberal |
| Progressive Conservative Party | René Soetens | Ontario | Ontario | | 1988 | Dan McTeague | Liberal |
| Progressive Conservative Party | Bobbie Sparrow | Calgary Southwest | Alberta | Minister of Energy, Mines, and Resources (1993) | 1984 | Preston Manning | Reform |
| Progressive Conservative Party | Ross Stevenson | Durham | Ontario | | 1988 | Alex Shepherd | Liberal |
| Progressive Conservative Party | Guy St-Julien | Abitibi | Quebec | | 1984 | Bernard Deshaies | Bloc Québécois |
| Progressive Conservative Party | Monique Tardif | Charlesbourg | Quebec | | 1984 | Jean-Marc Jacob | Bloc Québécois |
| Progressive Conservative Party | Greg Thompson | Carleton—Charlotte | New Brunswick | | 1988 | Harold Culbert | Liberal |
| Progressive Conservative Party | Scott Thorkelson | Edmonton—Strathcona | Alberta | | 1988 | Hugh Hanrahan | Reform |
| Progressive Conservative Party | Marcel Tremblay | Quebec East | Quebec | | 1984 | Jean-Paul Marchand | Bloc Québécois |
| Progressive Conservative Party | Garth Turner | Halton—Peel | Ontario | | 1988 | Julian Reed | Liberal |
| Progressive Conservative Party | Bernard Valcourt | Madawaska—Victoria | New Brunswick | | 1984 | Pierrette Ringuette | Liberal |
| Progressive Conservative Party | Bill Vankoughnet | Hastings—Frontenac—Lennox and Addington | Ontario | | 1984 | Larry McCormick | Liberal |
| Progressive Conservative Party | Jacques Vien | Laurentides | Quebec | | 1988 | Monique Guay | Bloc Québécois |
| Progressive Conservative Party | Pierre H. Vincent | Trois-Rivières | Quebec | | 1984 | Yves Rocheleau | Bloc Québécois |
| Progressive Conservative Party | Gerry Weiner | Pierrefonds—Dollard | Quebec | | 1988 | Bernard Patry | Liberal |
| Progressive Conservative Party | Stan Wilbee | Delta | British Columbia | | 1988 | John Cummins | Reform |
| Progressive Conservative Party | Geoff Wilson | Swift Current—Maple Creek—Assiniboia | Saskatchewan | | 1984 | Lee Morrison | Reform |
| Progressive Conservative Party | Dave Worthy | Cariboo—Chilcotin | British Columbia | | 1988 | Philip Mayfield | Reform |

== New Democrat ==
| Party | Name | Constituency | Province | Year elected | Defeated by | Party |
|---|---|---|---|---|---|---|
| New Democrat | Iain Angus | Thunder Bay—Atikokan | Ontario | 1984 | Stan Dromisky | Liberal |
| New Democrat | Dave Barrett | Esquimalt—Juan de Fuca | British Columbia | 1988 | Keith Martin | Reform |
| New Democrat | Dawn Black | New Westminster—Burnaby | British Columbia | 1988 | Paul Forseth | Reform |
| New Democrat | Michael Breaugh | Oshawa | Ontario | 1990 | Ivan Grose | Liberal |
| New Democrat | John Brewin | Victoria | British Columbia | 1988 | David Anderson | Liberal |
| New Democrat | Steve Butland | Sault Ste. Marie | Ontario | 1988 | Ron Irwin | Liberal |
| New Democrat | Ron Fisher | Saskatoon—Dundurn | Saskatchewan | 1988 | Morris Bodnar | Liberal |
| New Democrat | Ray Funk | Prince Albert—Churchill River | Saskatchewan | 1988 | Gordon Kirkby | Liberal |
| New Democrat | Brian Gardiner | Prince George—Bulkley Valley | British Columbia | 1988 | Dick Harris | Reform |
| New Democrat | Ross Harvey | Edmonton East | Alberta | 1988 | Judy Bethel | Liberal |
| New Democrat | Lynn Hunter | Saanich—Gulf Islands | British Columbia | 1988 | Jack Frazer | Reform |
| New Democrat | Jim Karpoff | Surrey North | British Columbia | 1988 | Margaret Bridgman | Reform |
| New Democrat | Joy Langan | Mission—Coquitlam | British Columbia | 1988 | Daphne Jennings | Reform |
| New Democrat | Steven W. Langdon | Essex—Windsor | Ontario | 1984 | Susan Whelan | Liberal |
| New Democrat | Rod Laporte | Moose Jaw—Lake Centre | Saskatchewan | 1988 | Allan Kerpan | Reform |
| New Democrat | Lyle MacWilliam | Okanagan—Shuswap | British Columbia | 1988 | Darrel Stinson | Reform |
| New Democrat | Howard McCurdy | Windsor—St. Clair | Ontario | 1988 | Shaughnessy Cohen | Liberal |
| New Democrat | Margaret Mitchell | Vancouver East | British Columbia | 1979 | Anna Terrana | Liberal |
| New Democrat | Rod Murphy | Churchill | Manitoba | 1979 | Elijah Harper | Liberal |
| New Democrat | Lorne Nystrom | Yorkton—Melville | Saskatchewan | 1968 | Garry Breitkreuz | Reform |
| New Democrat | Sid Parker | Kootenay East | British Columbia | 1988 | Jim Abbott | Reform |
| New Democrat | John Rodriguez | Nickel Belt | Ontario | 1984 | Ray Bonin | Liberal |
| New Democrat | Cid Samson | Timmins—Chapleau | Ontario | 1988 | Peter Thalheimer | Liberal |
| New Democrat | Bob Skelly | Comox—Alberni | British Columbia | 1988 | Bill Gilmour | Reform |
| New Democrat | Raymond Skelly | North Island—Powell River | British Columbia | 1988 | John Duncan | Reform |
| New Democrat | David Stupich | Nanaimo—Cowichan | British Columbia | 1988 | Bob Ringma | Reform |
| New Democrat | Ian Waddell | Port Moody—Coquitlam | British Columbia | 1979 | Sharon Hayes | Reform |
| New Democrat | Jack Whittaker | Okanagan—Similkameen—Merritt | British Columbia | 1988 | Jim Hart | Reform |
| New Democrat | Neil Young | Beaches—Woodbine | Ontario | 1980 | Maria Minna | Liberal |

== Independent ==
| Party | Name | Constituency | Province | Year elected | Defeated by | Party |
|---|---|---|---|---|---|---|
| Independent | Carole Jacques (elected Progressive Conservative) | Mercier | Quebec | 1984 | Francine Lalonde | Bloc Québécois |
| Independent | Alex Kindy (elected Progressive Conservative) | Calgary Northeast | Alberta | 1984 | Art Hanger | Reform |
| Independent | Pat Nowlan (elected Progressive Conservative) | Annapolis Valley—Hants | Nova Scotia | 1965 | John Murphy | Liberal |
