= La Reine, Quebec =

La Reine
- Municipality
- La Reine in 2026
- Motto: La joie des arrivées et les sanglots des départs
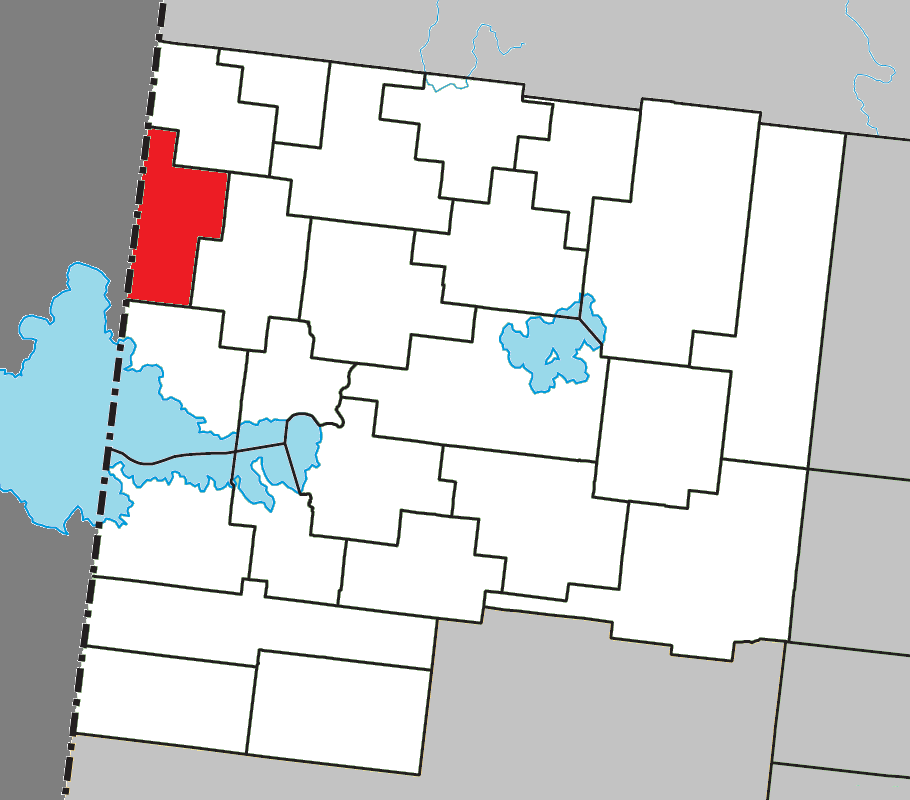
- Location within Abitibi-Ouest RCM

- Location in western Quebec
- Coordinates: 48°52′N 79°30′W
- Country: Canada
- Province: Quebec
- Region: Abitibi-Témiscamingue
- RCM: Abitibi-Ouest
- Settled: 1913
- Constituted: September 19, 1981

Government
  - Mayor: Fanny Dupras-Rossier
  - Federal riding: Abitibi—Témiscamingue
  - Prov. riding: Abitibi-Ouest

Area
  - Total: 98.49 km^{2} (38.03 sq mi)
  - Land: 97.63 km^{2} (37.70 sq mi)

Population (2021)
  - Total: 307
  - Density: 3.1/km^{2} (8.0/sq mi)
  - Pop (2016-21): ▼9.4%
  - Dwellings: 164
- Time zone: UTC−5 (EST)
  - Summer (DST): UTC−4 (EDT)
- Postal code(s): J0Z 2L0
- Area code: 819
- Highways: No major routes
- Website: lareine.ao.ca

La Reine (French pronunciation: [la ʁɛːn]) is a municipality in northwestern Quebec, Canada, on the La Reine River in the Abitibi-Ouest Regional County Municipality. It had a population of 307 in the Canada 2021 Census.

The place is named after La Reine Regiment (French for "the Queen"), that was founded in 1634 and fought under General Montcalm at the Battle of Carillon and Battle of Quebec.

== History ==
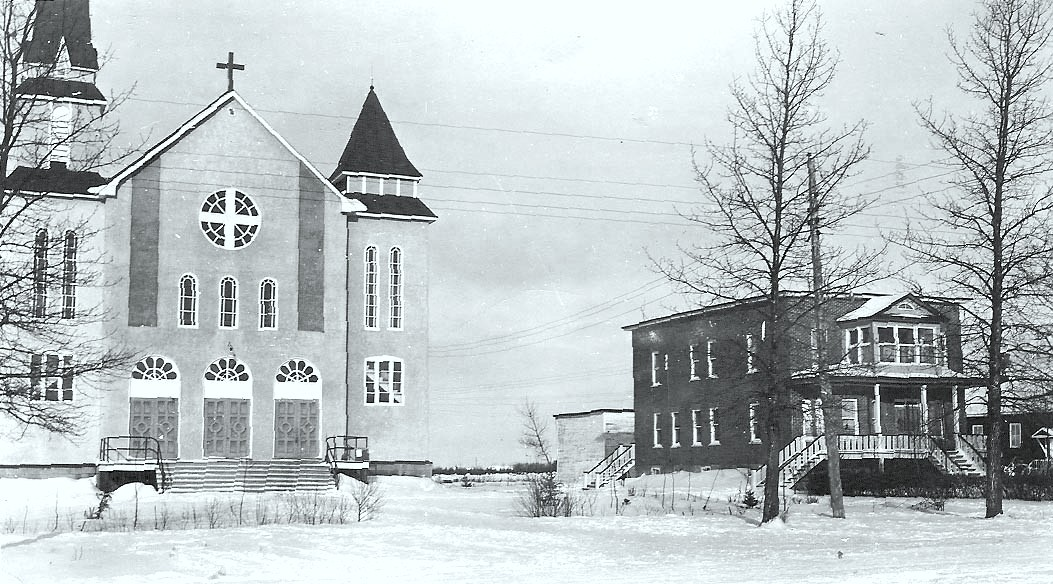
La Reine in 1972

The first pioneers were from Berthier County and arrived in 1913, around the time when the National Transcontinental Railway was completed. The train station was first designed as Okiko, derived from the Algonquin name for the La Reine River Okikadosag Sibi. The following year the Mission of Saint-Philippe-de-La Reine was founded. In 1917, the place was incorporated as the United Township Municipality of La Reine-et-Desmeloizes-Partie-Ouest. In 1922, the village itself separated from the united township and formed the Village Municipality of La Reine.

In 1949, the united township municipality changed its name and status to the Municipality of La Reine. In 1981, this municipality and the village municipality were rejoined.

== Demographics ==
=== Population ===
Canada census – La Reine community profile

	2021	2016	2011
Population	307 (-9.4% from 2016)	339 (-0.3% from 2011)	340 (-6.1% from 2006)
Land area	97.63 km^{2} (37.70 sq mi)	97.93 km^{2} (37.81 sq mi)	97.35 km^{2} (37.59 sq mi)
Population density	3.1/km^{2} (8.0/sq mi)	3.5/km^{2} (9.1/sq mi)	3.5/km^{2} (9.1/sq mi)
Median age	48.4 (M: 48.0, F: 50.4)	47.3 (M: 48.2, F: 47.7)	47.3 (M: 46.5, F: 48.5)
Private dwellings	164 (total) 142 (occupied)	171 (total)	163 (total)
Median household income	$69,000	$53,120	$56,654

References: 2021 2016 2011

Historical census populations – La Reine, Quebec

Year	Pop.	±%
1921	799	—
1931	948	+18.6%
1941	809	−14.7%
1951	662	−18.2%
1956	646	−2.4%
1961	572	−11.5%

Year	Pop.	±%
1966	482	−15.7%
1971	356	−26.1%
1976	238	−33.1%
1981	237	−0.4%
1986	520	+119.4%
1991	473	−9.0%

Year	Pop.	±%
1996	437	−7.6%
2001	386	−11.7%
2006	362	−6.2%
2011	340	−6.1%
2016	339	−0.3%
2021	307	−9.4%

Source: Statistics Canada

=== Language ===
Canada Census Mother Tongue - La Reine, Quebec
Census	Total	French			English			French & English			Other		
Year	Responses	Count	Trend	Pop %	Count	Trend	Pop %	Count	Trend	Pop %	Count	Trend	Pop %
2021	305	290	▼10.8%	95.1%	0	0.0%	0.0%	5	▲ n/a%	1.6%	5	▼50.0%	1.6%
2016	340	325	▼3.0%	95.6%	0	0.0%	0.0%	0	0.0%	0.0%	10	▲ n/a%	2.9%
2011	335	335	▼2.9%	100.0%	0	▼100.0%	0.0%	0	0.0%	0.0%	0	▼100.0%	0.0%
2006	365	345	▼6.8%	94.5%	10	▲ n/a%	2.7%	0	0.0%	0.0%	10	0.0%	2.7%
2001	380	370	▼15.9%	97.4%	0	0.0%	0.0%	0	0.0%	0.0%	10	▲ n/a%	2.6%
1996	440	440	n/a	100.0%	0	n/a	0.0%	0	n/a	0.0%	0	n/a	0.0%

== Government ==
Municipal council (2024):

- Mayor: Fanny Dupras-Rossier
- Councillors: Réjean Bernard, Chantal Godbout, Jean-François Royer, David Royer, Sophie Bouchard, Réal East

== Notable people ==
Notable people from La Reine include:

- Christine Moore – NDP politician

== See also ==
- List of municipalities in Quebec
