= Christine Moore (politician) =

Canadian politician

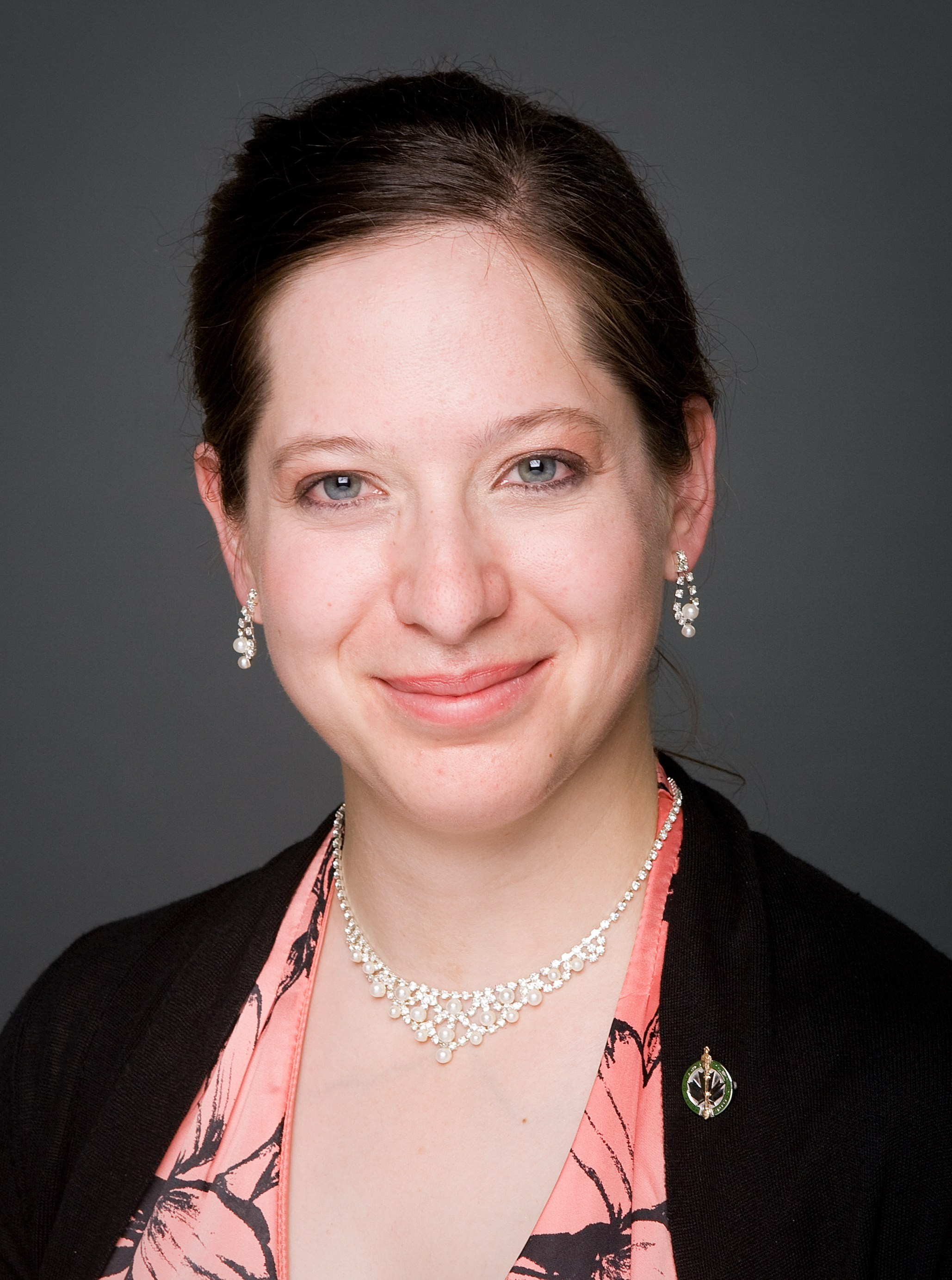

Member of Parliament for Abitibi—Témiscamingue
- In office May 2, 2011 – September 11, 2019
- Preceded by: Marc Lemay
- Succeeded by: Sébastien Lemire

Personal details
- Born: October 21, 1983 (age 42) La Sarre, Quebec, Canada
- Party: New Democratic (federal); Parti Quebecois (provincial)
- Profession: Nurse

Christine Moore (born October 21, 1983) is a Canadian politician and nurse who served as the Member of Parliament (MP) for the riding of Abitibi—Témiscamingue from 2011 to 2019. A member of the New Democratic Party (NDP), she was first elected in the 2011 Canadian federal election, defeating Bloc Québécois MP Marc Lemay, who had held the riding since 2004. She was re-elected during the 2015 federal election. She did not run for re-election in the 2019 federal election. Despite her Anglophone-sounding name, Moore is a Francophone.

== Early life ==
Moore was born in La Reine, Quebec.

== Education and experience ==
Moore was trained as a medical technician; she was educated at 52e Medical coy (Army Force) Sherbrooke and graduated in 2005. She earned a diploma of college studies in nursing from the Cégep de l'Abitibi-Témiscamingue in 2008 and a B.Sc. in nursing from the Université du Québec en Abitibi-Témiscamingue (UQAT) in 2010. She completed a one-month humanitarian internship in Senegal as part of her nursing degree at UQAT in 2009, and she served with the Canadian Forces for over three years. She is also a member of Nurses Without Borders.

== Political career ==
=== Federal politics ===
Moore finished a distant fourth as the NDP candidate in Abitibi—Témiscamingue in 2006 and 2008; both times, she came up well short of the 10-percent threshold to have her campaign expenses refunded. However, on her third try in 2011, she defeated Lemay by 9,500 votes as part of the NDP wave that swept through Quebec.

On May 26, 2011, Moore was appointed the federal Official Opposition critic for military procurement. The key files Moore was responsible for included the purchase of F 35s, the modernization of various navy ships, and the replacement of search and rescue aircraft. Consequently, she worked mostly on the Standing Committee on National Defence, the main forum for addressing these issues. She also assisted Jack Harris with his duties as federal Official Opposition critic for National Defence.

In November 2013, Moore was appointed deputy critic for energy and natural resources for the NDP. The key files covered by this responsibility: forestry, mines, nuclear & pipelines. In 2014, Moore brought forward a motion to promote a national strategy on forestry in Canada. This motion asked that the government should work in consultation with provinces and territories, First Nations, stakeholders, and the public to put forward, a national strategy to advance Canada's forestry sector, with the objectives of creating value-added jobs, developing our forests in a sustainable way, diversifying and promoting wood-based products and developing building systems, and by expanding international markets for Canadian wood products.

During the 2011–2012 New Democratic Party leadership race, Moore endorsed Romeo Saganash.

Moore anonymously accused Liberal MPs Massimo Pacetti and Scott Andrews of sexual harassment in 2014, causing both to be expelled from the Liberal caucus. It became known that she was the accuser in 2018.

In January 2015, Moore was appointed deputy critic for health for the NDP. She was reelected at the federal election held a few months later, with a somewhat reduced plurality.

In February 2016, Moore was elected to the executive committee of the Commonwealth Parliamentary Association as a vice-chair. She also served as vice-chair of the Canadian Association of Parliamentarians on Population and Development.

Moore gave birth during the election campaign in 2015. She had been pushing for more resources for MPs with newborns since she came back to Parliament in fall in 2015: high chairs were put in parliamentary cafeteria, the Commons Board of Internal Economy also changed the name of the "spouses lounge" near the Commons Chamber to "family room" to better accommodate the changing demographics of the House.

On March 24, 2016, Moore introduced the bill that would eliminate the federal tax on certain baby products.

On May 8, 2018, CBC News reported that Moore had had a non-consensual sexual encounter with a disabled Canadian Forces member, Glen Kirkland, who had come to Parliament Hill in 2013 to testify about military treatment of injured soldiers and veterans. She was suspended from the NDP caucus the same day, and Moore said that they had been in a romantic relationship. On July 19, 2018, party leader Jagmeet Singh publicly announced the results of an investigation into his MP's behaviour exonerating her from the allegations and reinstating her to her previous caucus duties.

On June 7, 2019 Moore announced she would not be seeking re-election in the 2019 federal election.

=== Provincial politics ===
Moore ran as a Parti Québecois candidate in the 2022 Quebec provincial election in Ungava, coming in fourth.

== Electoral record ==
Abitibi—Témiscamingue

2015 Canadian federal election
Party	Candidate	Votes	%	±%	Expenditures
New Democratic	Christine Moore	20,636	41.5	-9.75	–
Liberal	Claude Thibault	14,733	29.6	+23.68	–
Bloc Québécois	Yvon Moreau	9,651	19.4	-12.1	–
Conservative	Benoit Fortin	3,425	6.9	-3.0	–
Green	Aline Bégin	859	1.7	+0.27	–
Rhinoceros	Pascal Le Fou Gélinas	425	0.9	–	–
Total valid votes/expense limit		50,470	100.0		$253,763.89
Total rejected ballots		741	–	–	
Turnout		51,481	62.25	+2.4	
Eligible voters		82,695			
Source: Elections Canada

2011 Canadian federal election
Party	Candidate	Votes	%	±%	Expenditures
New Democratic	Christine Moore	24,763	51.22	+41.72	
Bloc Québécois	Marc Lemay	15,258	31.56	-16.35	
Conservative	Steven Hébert	4,777	9.88	-9.05	
Liberal	Suzie Grenon	2,859	5.91	-14.82	
Green	Patrick Rochon	694	1.44	-0.79	
Total valid votes/expense limit		48,351	100.00		
Total rejected ballots		654	1.33		
Turnout		49,005	59.85		
New Democratic Party gain from Bloc Québécois		Swing	+29.0		

2008 Canadian federal election
Party	Candidate	Votes	%	±%	Expenditures
Bloc Québécois	Marc Lemay	20,929	47.91	-4.42	$96,091
Liberal	Gilbert Barrette	9,055	20.73	+6.92	$29,810
Conservative	Pierre Grandmaitre	8,267	18.93	-3.66	$742
New Democratic	Christine Moore	4,151	9.50	+0.96	$3,377
Green	Bruno Côté	976	2.23	-0.50	$742
Independent	Ghislain Loiselle	302	0.69	–	$644
Total valid votes/expense limit		43,680	100.00	$101,466	

2006 Canadian federal election
Party	Candidate	Votes	%	±%	Expenditures
Bloc Québécois	Marc Lemay	24,637	52.33	-5.32	$73,954
Conservative	Marie-Josée Carbonneau	10,634	22.59	+17.01	$6,194
Liberal	Charles Lavergne	6,501	13.81	-17.17	$21,500
New Democratic	Christine Moore	4,022	8.54	+5.15	$2,782
Green	Patrick Rancourt	1,283	2.73	+0.34	$710
Total valid votes/expense limit		47,077	100.00	$94,667	
Bloc Québécois hold		Swing		-11.2	
