= Henri Tousignant =

Canadian politician

Henri Tousignant (born 20 August 1937) was a Liberal party member of the House of Commons of Canada. He was an industrialist by career.

Born in Palmarolle, Tousignant represented the Quebec riding of Témiscamingue at which he was elected in 1979 and again in 1980. Tousignant served in the 31st and 32nd Canadian Parliaments before being defeated in the 1984 election by Gabriel Desjardins of the Progressive Conservative party.
