= Marc Lemay =

Canadian politician from Quebec (born 1951)

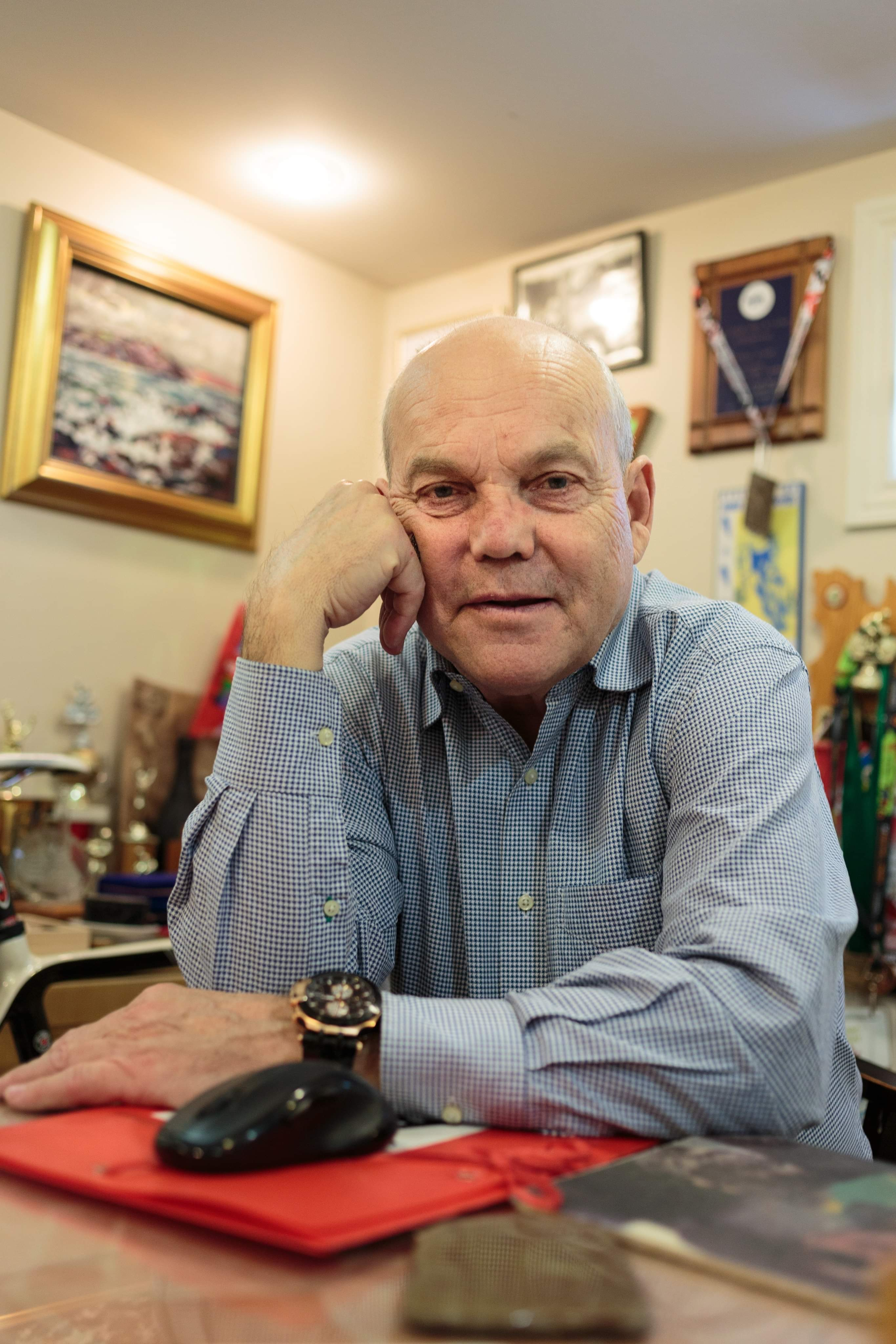

Member of Parliament for Abitibi—Témiscamingue
- In office June 28, 2004 – May 1, 2011
- Preceded by: Riding established
- Succeeded by: Christine Moore

Personal details
- Born: April 4, 1951 (age 75) Amos, Quebec, Canada
- Party: Bloc Québécois
- Profession: Lawyer

Marc Lemay (born April 4, 1951) is a Canadian politician who served as the Member of Parliament (MP) for Abitibi—Témiscamingue from 2004 to 2011. He is a member of the Bloc Québécois (BQ).

== Biography ==
Lemay was born in Amos, Quebec. A lawyer by occupation, he was first elected to the House of Commons in the 2004 federal election as the Bloc Québécois candidate in the newly-established riding of Abitibi—Témiscamingue. He defeated sitting MP Gilbert Barrette, the Liberal candidate, by nearly 12,000 votes. As a parliamentarian, Lemay was the Bloc's critic for Indian Affairs and Northern Development. He was defeated in the 2011 federal election by Christine Moore of the New Democratic Party (NDP).
