= Lise Bourgault =

Canadian politician

Member of the Canadian Parliament for Argenteuil—Papineau
- In office 1984–1993
- Preceded by: Robert Gourd
- Succeeded by: Maurice Dumas

Personal details
- Born: June 5, 1950 (age 75) Saint-Pamphile, Quebec
- Party: Progressive Conservative

Lise Bourgault (born June 5, 1950) is a Canadian politician. Since 2003, she has been the mayor of Brownsburg-Chatham, Quebec.

Bourgault was born in St-Pamphile, Quebec. She was elected to the House of Commons of Canada for the riding of Argenteuil—Papineau in the 1984 federal election. A Progressive Conservative, she was re-elected in the 1988 federal election before being defeated in the 1993 election. From 1987 to 1989, she was the Parliamentary Secretary to the Minister of Consumer and Corporate Affairs. From 1989 to 1991, she was the Parliamentary Secretary to the Minister of National Health and Welfare. In 1991, she was the Parliamentary Secretary to the Minister of Supply and Services. She ran in the 2000 federal election as a Liberal in the riding of Argenteuil—Papineau—Mirabel but lost by 542 votes to the Bloc Québécois candidate.

== Electoral record (incomplete) ==
2000 Canadian federal election: Argenteuil—Papineau—Mirabel
Party	Candidate	Votes	%	±%	Expenditures
Bloc Québécois	Mario Laframboise	21,713	43.20	+2.33	$63,057
Liberal	Lise Bourgault	21,171	42.12	+8.10	$59,477
Alliance	Francine Labelle	2,897	5.76		$2,011
Progressive Conservative	Jean-Denis Pelletier	1,848	3.68	−17.86	$6,611
Marijuana	Pierre Audette	934	1.86	–	none listed
Green	Gilles Bisson	723	1.44		$16
New Democratic	Didier Charles	550	1.09	−0.52	none listed
Natural Law	Marie-Thérèse Nault	256	0.51	−0.47	none listed
Christian Heritage	Laurent Filion	167	0.33	−0.64	$138
Total valid votes		50,259	100.00		
Total rejected ballots		1,387			
Turnout		51,646	63.74	−7.63	
Electors on the lists		81,024			
Sources: Official Results, Elections Canada and Financial Returns, Elections Canada.

1993 Canadian federal election
Party	Candidate	Votes	%	±%
Bloc Québécois	Maurice Dumas	23,360	47.25%	
Liberal	Jacques Desforges	14,234	28.79%	+1.7%
Progressive Conservative	Lise Bourgault	10,959	22.17%	-34.2%
New Democratic	Jean G. Drapeau	888	1.80%	-12.3%
Total valid votes		49,374	100.0%	

1988 Canadian federal election
Party	Candidate	Votes	%	±%
Progressive Conservative	Lise Bourgault	23,076	56.43%	+0.5%
Liberal	Peter Georgakakos	11,088	27.11%	-4.9%
New Democratic	André Marc Paré	5,772	14.11%	+7.0%
Rhinoceros	Michel Le Whip Paré	959	2.35%	-0.2%
Total valid votes		40,895	100.0%	

1984 Canadian federal election: Argenteuil—Papineau
Party	Candidate	Votes	%
Progressive Conservative	Lise Bourgault	21,105	55.93
Liberal	Robert Gourd	12,096	32.06
New Democratic	Bjorn Johansson	2,671	7.08
Rhinoceros	Claude Sam Sabourin	946	2.51
Parti nationaliste	François Granger	566	1.50
Independent	Alphonse Bélec	350	0.93
Total valid votes		37,734	100.00
Total rejected ballots		328	
Turnout		38,062	76.80
Electors on the lists		49.563	
