= Sébastien Lemire =

Canadian politician

Sébastien Lemire MP
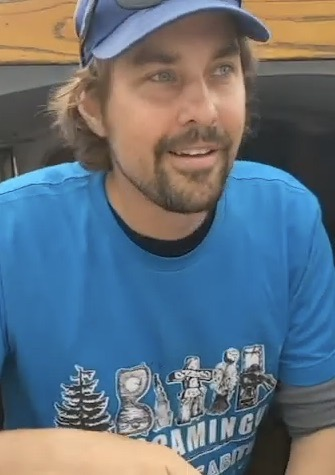
- Lemire in 2020

Member of Parliament for Abitibi—Témiscamingue
- Incumbent
- Assumed office October 21, 2019
- Preceded by: Christine Moore

Personal details
- Party: Bloc Québécois

Sébastien Lemire MP is a Canadian politician, who was elected to the House of Commons of Canada in the 2019 election. He represents the electoral district of Abitibi—Témiscamingue as a member of the Bloc Québécois.

On 21 April 2021, Lemire admitted to taking a photo of a naked Will Amos on a Zoom call and offered an apology in the House of Commons to that MP.

== Political career ==
Following the 2021 Canadian federal election he was appointed the critic of industry, regional high-speed internet and entrepreneurship in the Bloc Québécois Shadow Cabinet.

He was elected vice chair of the Canadian House of Commons Standing Committee on Indigenous and Northern Affairs and the Canadian House of Commons Standing Committee on Public Accounts in the 45th Canadian Parliament in 2025.

== Electoral record ==
2025 Canadian federal election: Abitibi—Témiscamingue
Party	Candidate	Votes	%	±%	Expenditures
Bloc Québécois	Sébastien Lemire	24,774	49.43	-1.18	
Liberal	Jonathan Andresen	13,551	27.04	+2.93	
Conservative	Steve Tardif	9,861	19.68	+7.99	
New Democratic	Jérémie Juneau	1,480	2.95	-3.17	
Rhinoceros	Vincent Palin-Bussières	449	0.90	+0.30	
Total valid votes/expense limit		50,115	98.33		
Total rejected ballots		851	1.67		
Turnout		50,966	62.16		
Eligible voters		81,995			
Bloc Québécois hold		Swing		-2.06	
Source: Elections Canada
Note: number of eligible voters does not include voting day registrations.

2021 Canadian federal election: Abitibi—Témiscamingue
Party	Candidate	Votes	%	±%	Expenditures
Bloc Québécois	Sébastien Lemire	23,120	50.61	+5.14	$27,362.09
Liberal	William Legault-Lacasse	11,013	24.11	–0.65	$12,006.97
Conservative	Luis Henry Gonzalez Venegas	5,339	11.69	–3.34	$7,297.49
New Democratic	Bethany Stewart	2,794	6.12	–4.03	$241.69
People's	Eric Lacroix	1,538	3.37	+2.40	none listed
Free	Dany Goulet	858	1.88	N/A	$1,862.60
Green	Martin Chartrand	748	1.64	–1.98	$0.00
Rhinoceros	Joël Lirette	275	0.60	N/A	none listed
Total valid votes/expense limit		45,685	100.00	–	$129,939.01
Total rejected ballots		909	1.95	–0.11	
Turnout		46,594	56.47	–5.73	
Eligible voters		82,518			
Bloc Québécois hold		Swing		+2.90	
Source: Elections Canada

2019 Canadian federal election: Abitibi—Témiscamingue
Party	Candidate	Votes	%	±%	Expenditures
Bloc Québécois	Sébastien Lemire	22,803	45.47	+26.06	$19,522.42
Liberal	Claude Thibault	12,417	24.76	-4.87	$61,531.99
Conservative	Mario Provencher	7,537	15.03	+8.14	none listed
New Democratic	Alain Guimond	5,093	10.15	-31.34	$14,294.83
Green	Aline Bégin	1,818	3.62	+1.90	none listed
People's	Jacques Girard	487	0.97		none listed
Total valid votes/expense limit		50,155	97.94		
Total rejected ballots		1,057	2.06	+0.60	
Turnout		51,212	62.20	+1.36	
Eligible voters		82,341			
Bloc Québécois gain from New Democratic		Swing		+28.70	
Source: Elections Canada
