= Robert Gourd =

Canadian politician

Robert Gourd (1933 – March 22, 2015) was a Liberal party member of the House of Commons of Canada. He was a manufacturer and administrator by career.

Gourd was born in Amos, Quebec. He won the Argenteuil electoral district in the 1979 federal election and was re-elected there in the 1980 election. He was defeated in the 1984 election by Lise Bourgault of the Progressive Conservative party.

He served in various business capacities after his departure from national politics and was a Commissioner on the International Joint Commission which supports the International Boundary Waters Treaty between Canada and the United States. He died in Montreal on March 22, 2015.

1980 Canadian federal election: Argenteuil
Party	Candidate	Votes	%	±%
Liberal	Robert Gourd	21,976	68.60%	+4.3%
Progressive Conservative	Benoit Parent	5,128	16.01%	-1.2%
New Democratic	Ida Brown	2,422	7.56%	+3.0%
Rhinoceros	Yo François Gourd	1,298	4.05%	
Social Credit	Maurice Marcoux	1,074	3.35%	-7.7%
Marxist–Leninist	Jacques Cote	135	0.42%	+0.0%
Total valid votes		32,033	100.0%	
Source(s) "Argenteuil, Quebec (1979-03-26 - 1981-01-16)". History of Federal Ridings Since 1867. Library of Parliament.

1979 Canadian federal election: Argenteuil
Party	Candidate	Votes	%
Liberal	Robert Gourd	22,043	64.27%
Progressive Conservative	George Kirby	5,889	17.17%
Social Credit	Antoine Bedard	3,780	11.02%
New Democratic	Thérèse Gardner Pelletier	1,576	4.60%
Rhinoceros	Michel Rivard	699	2.04%
Marxist–Leninist	Jacques Cote	155	0.45%
Union populaire	Lucie Poirier	155	0.45%
Total valid votes		34,297	100.0%
