= Jacques Vien =

Canadian politician, businessman, and bailiff

Member of Parliament for Laurentides
- In office 1988–1993
- Preceded by: riding created
- Succeeded by: Monique Guay

Personal details
- Born: 3 March 1932 Verdun, Quebec, Canada
- Died: 8 July 2017 (aged 85)
- Party: Progressive Conservative
- Profession: businessman, bailiff

Jacques Vien (3 March 1932 – 8 July 2017) was a member of the House of Commons of Canada from 1988 to 1993. By career, he was a businessman and a bailiff.

Born in Verdun, Quebec, he was elected in the 1988 federal election at the Laurentides electoral district for the Progressive Conservative party. He served in the 34th Canadian Parliament after which he was defeated by Bloc Québécois candidate Monique Guay in the 1993 federal election. He also campaigned unsuccessfully to regain the seat for the Progressive Conservatives in the 1997 and 2000 federal elections.

He died on 8 July 2017 at the age of 85.

== Electoral record (incomplete) ==
1988 Canadian federal election: Laurentides
Party	Candidate	Votes	%	±%	Expenditures
Progressive Conservative	Jacques Vien	31,000	55.20		$46,393
Liberal	Serge Paquette	15,752	28.05	.	$44,288
New Democratic	Bill Clay	7,755	13.81		$12,206
Rhinoceros	Serge Hébert	1,408	2.51	.	$0
Commonwealth of Canada	Jean Vigneault	249	0.44		$0
Total valid votes		56,164	100.00		
Rejected, unmarked and declined ballots		1,056			
Turnout		57,220	72.57		
Electors on the lists		78,847			
