= Pierre Brien =

Canadian politician (born 1970)

Pierre Brien MP
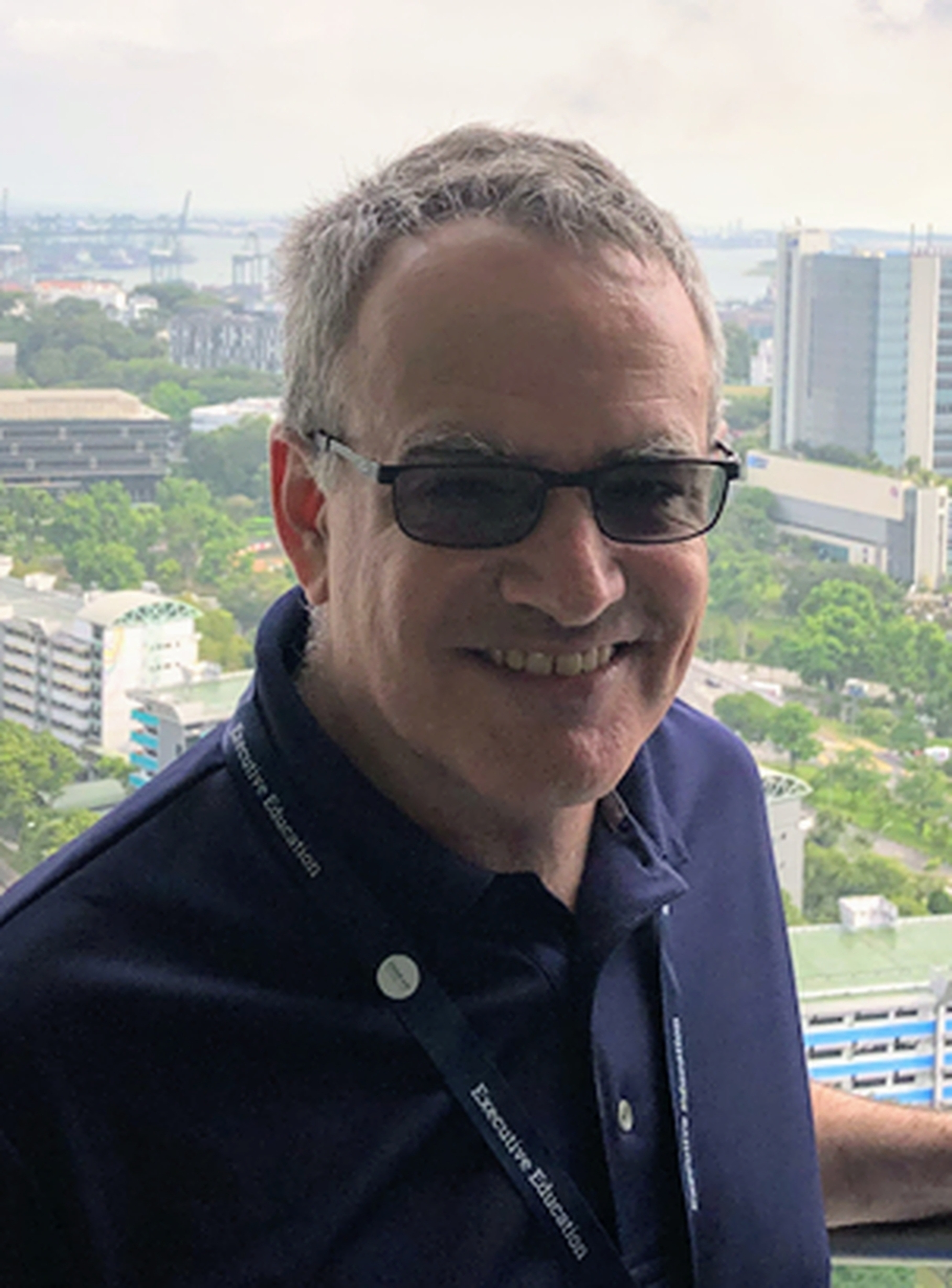

Member of Parliament for Abitibi—Témiscamingue
- In office 25 October 1993 – 14 March 2003
- Preceded by: Gabriel Desjardins
- Succeeded by: Gilbert Barrette

Personal details
- Born: 22 June 1970 (age 55) Ville-Marie, Quebec
- Party: Bloc Quebecois

Pierre Brien (born 22 June 1970 in Ville-Marie, Quebec) was a Member of Parliament from 25 October 1993 to 14 March 2003. By career, he has worked in administration and economics.

Brien was elected in the Témiscamingue electoral district under the Bloc Québécois party in the 1993, 1997 and 2000 elections, serving in the 35th, 36th and 37th Canadian Parliaments respectively. He had served as the party's whip from 15 August 2001 until 16 December 2002.

Brien left the Bloc Québécois following his decision to seek a seat in the Quebec National Assembly with the Action démocratique du Québec (ADQ). He remained in federal Parliament as an independent Member of Parliament from 16 January 2003 until he resigned from federal politics on 14 March 2003. He became the ADQ's candidate in the provincial Rouyn-Noranda–Témiscamingue riding, but he and Rémy Trudel of the Parti Québécois both lost against Liberal Daniel Bernard in the 2003 Quebec election.

Preceded by Gabriel Desjardins, Progressive Conservative	Members of Parliament from Témiscamingue	Succeeded by Gilbert Barrette, Liberal
