= Gabriel Desjardins =

Canadian politician

Gabriel Desjardins (born 14 February 1949 in Montreal, Quebec) was a Progressive Conservative member of the House of Commons of Canada. He was a businessman, professor and trader by career.

He represented the Quebec riding of Témiscamingue where he was first elected in the 1984 federal election and re-elected in 1988, therefore becoming a member in the 33rd and 34th Canadian Parliaments.

Desjardins left federal politics when he was defeated in the 1993 federal election by Pierre Brien of the Bloc Québécois.

== Electoral record ==
1984 Canadian federal election: Témiscamingue
Party	Candidate	Votes	%	±%
Progressive Conservative	Gabriel Desjardins	20,347	50.24	
Liberal	Henri Tousignant	13,756	33.96	
New Democratic	Guy Verville	2,189	5.40	
Parti nationaliste	Roberte Parent	2,126	5.25	
Rhinoceros	Marcel Yves Bégin	1,457	3.60	–
Social Credit	Rachel Lord	626	1.55	
Total valid votes		40,501	100.00	
Total rejected ballots		255		
Turnout		40,756	73.11	
Electors on the lists		55,749		
