= Laurentides (electoral district) =

Former federal electoral district in Quebec, Canada

Quebec electoral district

Defunct federal electoral district
- Legislature: House of Commons
- District created: 1987
- District abolished: 2003
- First contested: 1988
- Last contested: 2000

Laurentides ((French: [lɔʁɑ̃tid], Canadian French: [lɔʁɑ̃t͡sid])) was a federal electoral district in Quebec, Canada, that was represented in the House of Commons of Canada from 1988 to 2003.

This riding was created in 1987 from Labelle riding. It was abolished in 2003, and redistributed between Laurentides—Labelle and Rivière-du-Nord

Laurentides initially consisted of the towns of Estérel, Sainte-Adèle, Sainte-Agathe-des-Monts, Saint-Antoine and Saint-Jérôme, and parts of the Counties of Labelle and Montcalm.

In 1996, the riding was redefined to consist of the cities of Estérel, Saint-Antoine, Saint-Jérôme, Saint-Jovite, Sainte-Adèle and Sainte-Agathe-des-Monts, and parts of the County Regional Municipalities of Les Pays-d'en-Haut, La Rivière-du-Nord, and Le Laurentides.

== Members of Parliament ==
This riding elected the following members of Parliament:

Parliament	Years	Member	Party
Laurentides; Riding created from Labelle
34th	1988–1993	Jacques Vien	Progressive Conservative
35th	1993–1997	Monique Guay	Bloc Québécois
36th	1997–2000	Monique Guay	Bloc Québécois
37th	2000–2004	Monique Guay	Bloc Québécois
Riding dissolved into Laurentides—Labelle and Rivière-du-Nord

== Electoral history ==
1988 Canadian federal election
Party	Candidate	Votes
Progressive Conservative	Jacques Vien	31,000
Liberal	Serge Paquette	15,752
New Democratic	Bill Clay	7,755
Rhinoceros	Le Fakir Serge Hébert	1,408
Commonwealth of Canada	Jean Vigneault	249

1993 Canadian federal election
Party	Candidate	Votes
Bloc Québécois	Monique Guay	41,476
Liberal	Michelle Tisseyre	18,716
Progressive Conservative	Jacques Vien	7,059
New Democratic	Patricia Houle	815
Commonwealth of Canada	Gilles Gervais	484

1997 Canadian federal election
Party	Candidate	Votes
Bloc Québécois	Monique Guay	28,647
Liberal	Paul-André Forget	19,053
Progressive Conservative	Jacques Vien	14,096
New Democratic	David Rovins	844

2000 Canadian federal election
Party	Candidate	Votes
Bloc Québécois	Monique Guay	30,338
Liberal	Dominique Boyer	23,616
Progressive Conservative	Jacques Vien	3,094
Alliance	William Azeff	2,270
Natural Law	Jacinthe Millaire	757
New Democratic	Brendan Naef	720

== See also ==
- List of Canadian electoral districts
- Historical federal electoral districts of Canada
