= Monique Guay =

Canadian politician

Member of Parliament for Laurentides
- In office 1993–2004
- Preceded by: Jacques Vien
- Succeeded by: riding dissolved

Member of Parliament for Rivière-du-Nord
- In office 2004–2011
- Preceded by: first member
- Succeeded by: Pierre Dionne Labelle

Personal details
- Born: October 27, 1959 (age 66) L'Île-Bizard, Quebec, Canada
- Party: Bloc Québécois
- Spouse: widow
- Profession: administrator/businesswoman

Monique Guay (born October 27, 1959) is a Quebec politician. She was the Bloc Québécois Member of Parliament for the riding of Rivière-du-Nord.

Born in L'Île-Bizard, Quebec, she was an administrator and businesswoman before she was first elected in 1993 for the riding of Laurentides. She was re-elected in 1997, 2000, and 2004. From 2002 to 2004, she was the Bloc Québécois Caucus Chair. From 2004, she is the Bloc Québécois Deputy House Leader. In the 2011 elections, she was defeated by Pierre Dionne Labelle of the NDP.
