= Gilbert Barrette =

Canadian politician (born 1941)

Member of Parliament for Témiscamingue
- In office June 16, 2003 – June 28, 2004
- Preceded by: Pierre Brien
- Succeeded by: riding dissolved

Personal details
- Born: May 29, 1941 (age 84) Saint-Eugène de Guigues, Quebec, Canada
- Party: Liberal
- Occupation: School administrator

Gilbert Barrette (born May 29, 1941) is a Canadian politician.

He was a member of the Liberal Party of Canada in the House of Commons of Canada, representing the riding of Témiscamingue since 2003, where he won in a by-election. He lost the seat in the 2004 election to Bloc Québécois candidate Marc Lemay.

Barrette is a former school administrator.
