= Abitibi—Témiscamingue (electoral district) =

Federal electoral district in Quebec, Canada

Coordinates: 47.30°N 79.00°W

Quebec electoral district
- Interactive map of riding boundaries from the 2015 federal election

Federal electoral district
- Legislature: House of Commons
MP
Sébastien Lemire
Bloc Québécois
- District created: 1966
- First contested: 1968
- Last contested: 2025
- District webpage: profile, map

Demographics
- Population (2016): 103,491
- Electors (2019): 82,341
- Area (km²): 33,444.46
- Pop. density (per km²): 3.1
- Census division(s): Abitibi RCM, Abitibi-Ouest RCM, Jamésie Territory, Rouyn-Noranda, Témiscamingue RCM
- Census subdivision(s): Rouyn-Noranda, Amos, La Sarre, Macamic, Ville-Marie, Témiscaming, Barraute, Palmarolle, Lorrainville, Trécesson

Abitibi—Témiscamingue (French pronunciation: [abitibi temiskamɛ̃ɡ]) is a federal electoral district in Quebec, Canada, that has been represented in the House of Commons of Canada since 2004. The area was also represented by the electoral district of Témiscamingue from 1968 until 2004.

== Geography ==
The district includes the Regional County Municipalities of Témiscamingue, Abitibi, Abitibi-Ouest, the city of Rouyn-Noranda and a small section of south western Jamésie territory.

The neighbouring ridings are Abitibi—Baie-James—Nunavik—Eeyou, Pontiac—Kitigan Zibi, Algonquin—Renfrew—Pembroke, Nipissing—Timiskaming, and Kapuskasing—Timmins—Mushkegowuk.

== Demographics ==
According to the 2021 Canadian census

Ethnic groups: 92.8% White, 5.4% Indigenous

Languages: 94.0% French, 3.5% English

Religions: 72.4% Christian (66.9% Catholic, 5.5% Other), 26.7% None

Median income: $42,000 (2020)

Average income: $50,680 (2020)

== Riding associations ==
Riding associations are the local branches of political parties:

Party	Association name	President	HQ city
Conservative	Association du Parti conservateur d'Abitibi--Témiscamingue	Mathieu Ouellet	Saint-Colomban
Liberal	Association libérale fédérale de Abitibi--Témiscamingue	Clifford Bélanger	Rouyn-Noranda
New Democratic	Association NPD Abitibi--Témiscamingue	Duncan Viktor Salvain	Montreal

== History ==
Témiscamingue was created in 1968 from parts of Pontiac—Témiscamingue and Villeneuve.

It was initially defined to consist of:

- the Cities of Noranda and Rouyn;
- the Towns of Belleterre, Temiscaming and Ville-Marie;
- the County of Témiscamingue (except the Townships of Béraud, Chabert, Darlens, Desroberts, Granet, Jourdan, Landanet, Laubanie, Marrias, Mazérac, Pélissier and Sabourin without local municipal organization).

In 1976, it was redefined to consist of:

- the Cities of Noranda and Rouyn;
- the Towns of Belleterre, Duparquet, La Sarre, Macamic, Temiscaming and Ville-Marie;
- the County of Témiscamingue; and
- parts of the County of Abitibi.

In 1987, it was redefined to consist of:

- the towns of Belleterre, Duparquet, La Sarre, Macamic, Noranda, Rouyn, Témiscaming and Ville-Marie;
- the County of Témiscamingue excluding the Territory of Témiscamingue-Lac-Granet portion;
- parts of the County of Abitibi; and
- the southwest part of the Municipality of James Bay.

It was renamed "Rouyn-Noranda—Témiscamingue" in 1996, and redefined to consist of:

- the cities of Belleterre, Cadillac, Duparquet, La Sarre, Macamic, Rouyn-Noranda, Témiscaming and Ville-Marie;
- the county regional municipalities of Abitibi-Ouest and Rouyn-Noranda;
- the County Regional Municipality of Témiscamingue, including Timiskaming First Nation and Eagle Village First Nation-Kipawa Indian Reserve, the Indian settlements of Hunter's Point and Winneway; and
- the southwest part of the Municipality of James Bay.

In 1997, it was renamed "Témiscamingue".

The electoral district was abolished in 2003 when it was merged into Abitibi—Témiscamingue.

Abitibi—Témiscamingue was created in 2003. 77.1% came from Témiscamingue, and 22.9% from neighbouring Abitibi—Baie-James—Nunavik riding.

The riding lost a small territory to Abitibi—Baie-James—Nunavik—Eeyou as a result of the 2012 electoral redistribution.

=== Members of Parliament ===
This riding has elected the following members of the House of Commons of Canada:

Parliament	Years	Member	Party
Témiscamingue; Riding created from Pontiac—Témiscamingue and Villeneuve
28th	1968–1971	Réal Caouette	Ralliement créditiste
28th	1971–1972	Réal Caouette	Social Credit
29th	1972–1974	Réal Caouette	Social Credit
30th	1974–1976	Réal Caouette	Social Credit
30th	1977–1979	Gilles Caouette	Social Credit
31st	1979–1980	Henri Tousignant	Liberal
32nd	1980–1984	Henri Tousignant	Liberal
33rd	1984–1988	Gabriel Desjardins	Progressive Conservative
34th	1988–1993	Gabriel Desjardins	Progressive Conservative
35th	1993–1997	Pierre Brien	Bloc Québécois
36th	1997–2000	Pierre Brien	Bloc Québécois
37th	2000–2003	Pierre Brien	Bloc Québécois
37th	2003–2004	Gilbert Barrette	Liberal
Abitibi—Témiscamingue
38th	2004–2006	Marc Lemay	Bloc Québécois
39th	2006–2008	Marc Lemay	Bloc Québécois
40th	2008–2011	Marc Lemay	Bloc Québécois
41st	2011–2015	Christine Moore	New Democratic
42nd	2015–2019	Christine Moore	New Democratic
43rd	2019–2021	Sébastien Lemire	Bloc Québécois
44th	2021–2025	Sébastien Lemire	Bloc Québécois
45th	2025–present	Sébastien Lemire	Bloc Québécois

== Election results ==
=== Abitibi—Témiscamingue, 2004–present ===
2025 Canadian federal election
Party	Candidate	Votes	%	±%	Expenditures
Bloc Québécois	Sébastien Lemire	24,774	49.43	-1.18	
Liberal	Jonathan Andresen	13,551	27.04	+2.93	
Conservative	Steve Tardif	9,861	19.68	+7.99	
New Democratic	Jérémie Juneau	1,480	2.95	-3.17	
Rhinoceros	Vincent Palin-Bussières	449	0.90	+0.30	
Total valid votes/expense limit		50,115	98.33		
Total rejected ballots		851	1.67		
Turnout		50,966	62.16		
Eligible voters		81,995			
Bloc Québécois hold		Swing		-2.06	
Source: Elections Canada
Note: number of eligible voters does not include voting day registrations.

2021 Canadian federal election
Party	Candidate	Votes	%	±%	Expenditures
Bloc Québécois	Sébastien Lemire	23,120	50.61	+5.14	$27,362.09
Liberal	William Legault-Lacasse	11,013	24.11	–0.65	$12,006.97
Conservative	Luis Henry Gonzalez Venegas	5,339	11.69	–3.34	$7,297.49
New Democratic	Bethany Stewart	2,794	6.12	–4.03	$241.69
People's	Eric Lacroix	1,538	3.37	+2.40	none listed
Free	Dany Goulet	858	1.88	N/A	$1,862.60
Green	Martin Chartrand	748	1.64	–1.98	$0.00
Rhinoceros	Joël Lirette	275	0.60	N/A	none listed
Total valid votes/expense limit		45,685	100.00	–	$129,939.01
Total rejected ballots		909	1.95	–0.11	
Turnout		46,594	56.47	–5.73	
Eligible voters		82,518			
Bloc Québécois hold		Swing		+2.90	
Source: Elections Canada

2019 Canadian federal election
Party	Candidate	Votes	%	±%	Expenditures
Bloc Québécois	Sébastien Lemire	22,803	45.47	+26.06	$19,522.42
Liberal	Claude Thibault	12,417	24.76	-4.87	$61,531.99
Conservative	Mario Provencher	7,537	15.03	+8.14	none listed
New Democratic	Alain Guimond	5,093	10.15	-31.34	$14,294.83
Green	Aline Bégin	1,818	3.62	+1.90	none listed
People's	Jacques Girard	487	0.97		none listed
Total valid votes/expense limit		50,155	97.94		
Total rejected ballots		1,057	2.06	+0.60	
Turnout		51,212	62.20	+1.36	
Eligible voters		82,341			
Bloc Québécois gain from New Democratic		Swing		+28.70	
Source: Elections Canada

2015 Canadian federal election
Party	Candidate	Votes	%	±%	Expenditures
New Democratic	Christine Moore	20,636	41.50	-9.75	$20,806.53
Liberal	Claude Thibault	14,733	29.63	+23.71	$42,117.75
Bloc Québécois	Yvon Moreau	9,651	19.41	-12.09	$31,557.76
Conservative	Benoit Fortin	3,425	6.89	-3.01	$1,743.82
Green	Aline Bégin	859	1.73	+0.30	$6,188.67
Rhinoceros	Pascal Le Fou Gélinas	425	0.90	–	–
Total valid votes/expense limit		49,729	98.53		$253,899.84
Total rejected ballots		741	–	–	
Turnout		50,470	62.25	+2.4	
Eligible voters		82,695			
Source: Elections Canada

2011 federal election redistributed results
Party	Vote	%
New Democratic	24,583	51.25
Bloc Québécois	15,110	31.50
Conservative	4,750	9.90
Liberal	2,839	5.92
Green	687	1.43

2011 Canadian federal election
Party	Candidate	Votes	%	±%	Expenditures
New Democratic	Christine Moore	24,763	51.22	+41.72	$2,097.91
Bloc Québécois	Marc Lemay	15,258	31.56	-16.35	$100,215.97
Conservative	Steven Hébert	4,777	9.88	-9.05	$9,584.76
Liberal	Suzie Grenon	2,859	5.91	-14.82	$5,088.94
Green	Patrick Rochon	694	1.44	-0.79	
Total valid votes/Expense limit		48,351	100.00		
Total rejected ballots		654	1.33		
Turnout		49,005	59.85		
New Democratic Party gain from Bloc Québécois		Swing	+29.0		

2008 Canadian federal election
Party	Candidate	Votes	%	±%	Expenditures
Bloc Québécois	Marc Lemay	20,929	47.91	-4.42	$96,091
Liberal	Gilbert Barrette	9,055	20.73	+6.92	$29,810
Conservative	Pierre Grandmaitre	8,267	18.93	-3.66	$742
New Democratic	Christine Moore	4,151	9.50	+0.96	$3,377
Green	Bruno Côté	976	2.23	-0.50	$742
Independent	Ghislain Loiselle	302	0.69	–	$644
Total valid votes/Expense limit		43,680	100.00	$101,466	

2006 Canadian federal election
Party	Candidate	Votes	%	±%	Expenditures
Bloc Québécois	Marc Lemay	24,637	52.33	-5.32	$73,954
Conservative	Marie-Josée Carbonneau	10,634	22.59	+17.01	$6,194
Liberal	Charles Lavergne	6,501	13.81	-17.17	$21,500
New Democratic	Christine Moore	4,022	8.54	+5.15	$2,782
Green	Patrick Rancourt	1,283	2.73	+0.34	$710
Total valid votes/Expense limit		47,077	100.00	$94,667	
Bloc Québécois hold		Swing		-11.2	

2004 Canadian federal election
Party	Candidate	Votes	%	±%	Expenditures
Bloc Québécois	Marc Lemay	25,041	57.66	+22.51	$80,876
Liberal	Gilbert Barrette	13,457	30.98	-26.03	$75,073
Conservative	Bernard Hugues Beauchesne	2,425	5.58	+1.02	$4,435
New Democratic	Dennis Shushack	1,472	3.39	0.11	$3,825
Green	Patrick Rancourt	1,037	2.39	–	$285
Total valid votes/Expense limit		43,432	100.00	$93,778	

=== Témiscamingue, 1968–2004 ===
By-election: On Mr. Brien's resignation, 14 March 2003:

By-election on June 16, 2003
Party	Candidate	Votes	%	±%
Liberal	Gilbert Barrette	10,195	57.01	+14.26
Bloc Québécois	Sylvain Sauvageau	6,287	35.15	-14.99
Progressive Conservative	Rachel Lord	733	4.10	1.96
New Democratic	Dennis Shushack	587	3.28	1.97
Alliance	Clarence Marshall	82	0.46	-3.19
Total valid votes		17,884	100.00	–

2000 Canadian federal election
Party	Candidate	Votes	%	±%
Bloc Québécois	Pierre Brien	18,803	50.14	+3.52
Liberal	Roch Charron	16,032	42.75	+10.85
Alliance	Eric Larochelle	1,368	3.65	
Progressive Conservative	Sébastien Héroux	805	2.14	-17.69
New Democratic	Anik-Maude Morin	489	1.31	-0.34
Total valid votes		37,497	100.00	–

1997 Canadian federal election
Party	Candidate	Votes	%	±%
Bloc Québécois	Pierre Brien	18,528	46.62	-9.12
Liberal	Nora Bélanger-Teed	12,678	31.90	+9.03
Progressive Conservative	Denis Pilon	7,879	19.83	+0.49
New Democratic	Anik-Maude Morin	654	1.65	
Total valid votes		39,739	100.00	–

1993 Canadian federal election
Party	Candidate	Votes	%	±%
Bloc Québécois	Pierre Brien	22,555	55.74	
Liberal	Gilles Héroux	9,246	22.87	+8.72
Progressive Conservative	Gabriel Desjardins	7,806	19.34	-26.91
Natural Law	Grégoire Deguire	530	1.31	
Abolitionist	Célyne Ayotte	300	0.74	
Total valid votes		40,437	100.00	–

1988 Canadian federal election
Party	Candidate	Votes	%	±%
Progressive Conservative	Gabriel Desjardins	19,106	46.28	-3.96
New Democratic	Rémy Trudel	15,623	37.84	+32.44
Liberal	Laurent Guertin	5,843	14.15	-19.81
Rhinoceros	Jean Ouellet	712	1.72	-1.88
Total valid votes		41,284	100.00	–

1984 Canadian federal election
Party	Candidate	Votes	%	±%
Progressive Conservative	Gabriel Desjardins	20,347	50.24	+45.02
Liberal	Henri Tousignant	13,756	33.96	-27.06
New Democratic	Guy Verville	2,189	5.40	+1.01
Nationaliste	Roberte Parent	2,126	5.25	+3.84
Rhinoceros	Marcel Yves Bégin	1,457	3.60	+0.26
Social Credit	Rachel Lord	626	1.55	-22.42
Total valid votes		40,501	100.00	–

1980 Canadian federal election
Party	Candidate	Votes	%	±%
Liberal	Henri Tousignant	22,031	61.02	+19.7
Social Credit	Roger Bureau	8,653	23.97	-15.17
Progressive Conservative	Bernard Martel	1,886	5.22	-6.70
New Democratic	Marc Lord	1,586	4.39	+0.62
Rhinoceros	Michel Célestin Massicotte	1,206	3.34	+0.53
Union populaire	Réjean Fortier	510	1.41	+0.61
Independent	Ted McLaren	136	0.38	
Marxist–Leninist	Pierre-Jean Lafleur	96	0.27	+0.03
Total valid votes		36,104	100.00	–

1979 Canadian federal election
Party	Candidate	Votes	%	±%
Liberal	Henri Tousignant	16,147	41.32	+6.03
Social Credit	Gilles Caouette	15,295	39.14	-6.52
Progressive Conservative	Normand Grimard	4,659	11.92	-2.99
New Democratic	Germain Boudreau	1,473	3.77	+1.98
Rhinoceros	Raymond Paquin	1,099	2.81	
Union populaire	Marcel Lortie	311	0.80	
Marxist–Leninist	Fernand Deschamps	92	0.24	
Total valid votes		39,076	100.00	–

By-election: On Mr. Réal Caouette's death, 16 December 1976

By-election on 24 June 1977
Party	Candidate	Votes	%	±%
Social Credit	Gilles Caouette	9,603	45.66	-18.25
Liberal	Gaston Pratte	7,422	35.29	+6.15
Progressive Conservative	Normand Grimard	3,136	14.91	+11.99
Communist	Guy Desautels	495	2.35	
New Democratic	Réal Bellehumeur	377	1.79	-2.24
Total valid votes		21,033	100.00	–

1974 Canadian federal election
Party	Candidate	Votes	%	±%
Social Credit	Réal Caouette	14,026	63.91	+0.69
Liberal	Jacquelin Bergeron	6,396	29.14	+1.97
New Democratic	Réal Bellehumeur	884	4.03	+0.91
Progressive Conservative	Wilbrod Ayotte	641	2.92	-0.12
Total valid votes		21,947	100.00	–

1972 Canadian federal election
Party	Candidate	Votes	%	±%
Social Credit	Réal Caouette	15,660	63.22	+4.84
Liberal	Jacquelin Bergeron	6,731	27.17	-3.59
Independent	Claude Banville	854	3.45	
New Democratic	Charles Carpenter	774	3.12	+0.53
Progressive Conservative	Roger Rioux	752	3.04	-5.22
Total valid votes		24,771	100.00	–

1968 Canadian federal election
Party	Candidate	Votes	%
Ralliement créditiste	Réal Caouette	12,532	58.38
Liberal	Côme-A. Lapierre	6,603	30.76
Progressive Conservative	Aurore Charron-Labrie	1,774	8.26
New Democratic	George Wormsley	556	2.59
Total valid votes		21,465	100.00

== See also ==
- List of Canadian electoral districts
- Historical federal electoral districts of Canada
