= Maurice Dumas =

Canadian politician

Maurice Dumas (1 May 1927 – 18 January 2015) was a member of the House of Commons of Canada from 1993 to 2000. He was a professor by career. He was born in Montreal, Quebec.

He was elected in the Argenteuil—Papineau electoral district under the Bloc Québécois party in the 1993 and 1997 general elections, serving in the 35th and 36th Canadian Parliaments respectively. Dumas retired from Canadian politics in 2000.

== Electoral record (partial) ==
1997 Canadian federal election: Argenteuil—Papineau—Mirabel
Party	Candidate	Votes	%	±%	Expenditures
Bloc Québécois	Maurice Dumas	21,202	40.87		$62,394
Liberal	Stéphane Hébert	17,648	34.02	–	$38,356
Progressive Conservative	André Robert	11,171	21.54		$22,288
New Democratic	Didier Charles	836	1.61		$360
Natural Law	Marie-Thérèse Nault	509	0.98		$0
Christian Heritage	Laurent Filion	505	0.97		$3,337
Total valid votes		51,871	100.00		
Total rejected ballots		1,869			
Turnout		53,740	71.37		
Electors on the lists		75,301			
Sources: Official Results, Elections Canada and Financial Returns, Elections Canada.
