= Vancouver East (federal electoral district) =

Federal electoral district in British Columbia, Canada

Coordinates: 49.272°N 123.073°W

British Columbia electoral district
- Interactive map of riding boundaries from the 2015 federal election

Federal electoral district
- Legislature: House of Commons
MP
Jenny Kwan
New Democratic
- District created: 1933
- First contested: 1935
- Last contested: 2025
- District webpage: profile, map

Demographics
- Population (2021): 118,675
- Electors (2015): 85,900
- Area (km²): 21.66
- Pop. density (per km²): 5,479
- Census division: Metro Vancouver
- Census subdivision: Vancouver (part)

Vancouver East (French: Vancouver-Est) is a federal electoral district in British Columbia, Canada, that has been represented in the House of Commons of Canada since 1935. Since 2015, it has been represented by New Democratic Party MP Jenny Kwan.

Vancouver East is known as a New Democratic Party stronghold; the NDP and its Co-operative Commonwealth Federation predecessor have won all but two elections in the riding since its creation in 1933. Both losses (in 1974 and in 1993) have come at the hands of Liberal candidates who failed to retain the seat at the next election. The Conservative Party and its right-leaning predecessors have always fared poorly in the riding, rarely garnering more than 20 percent of the vote.

In the 2006 federal election, the NDP won a higher percentage of the vote in Vancouver East than in any other riding in the country: 56.6 percent. In the 2011 election, the NDP increased its majority win to 62.83 percent.

== Geography ==
The district includes the City of Vancouver neighbourhoods of Downtown Eastside, Mount Pleasant, Grandview–Woodland, and Hastings–Sunrise.

== Demographics ==
Though Vancouver East is home to a predominantly impoverished underclass populace, it is also home to a prominent industrial and working-class riding. The district is well known for hosting North America's largest Chinatown, in addition to being one of the poorest areas in the Metro Vancouver Regional District, known as the Downtown Eastside. 42 percent of the riding's inhabitants are immigrants and 22 percent are of Chinese ancestry. A high number, 63 percent, of residents are renters. 24 percent of residents over age 25 have a university certificate or degree. Manufacturing, tourism, shipping, accommodation and food service industries are vital to the employment base in this riding. The average family income is over CA$61,000. The unemployment rate is about 7.7 percent.

The ethnically diverse area is home to many of the city's artists and socio-political activists. In recent years, the area has been negatively affected by an influx of hard drugs and the concomitant social consequences associated with their use.

Panethnic groups in Vancouver East (2011−2021)
| Panethnic group | 2021 | | 2016 | | 2011 | |
| Panethnic group | Pop. | % | Pop. | % | Pop. | % |
|---|---|---|---|---|---|---|
| European (Note: Statistic includes all persons that did not make up part of a visible minority or an indigenous identity.) | 58,615 | 51.5% | 58,580 | 53.3% | 52,315 | 50.34% |
| East Asian (Note: Statistic includes total responses of "Chinese", "Korean", and "Japanese" under visible minority section on census.) | 25,600 | 22.49% | 26,880 | 24.46% | 27,590 | 26.55% |
| Southeast Asian (Note: Statistic includes total responses of "Filipino" and "Southeast Asian" under visible minority section on census.) | 9,270 | 8.15% | 8,975 | 8.17% | 10,500 | 10.1% |
| Indigenous | 5,940 | 5.22% | 5,880 | 5.35% | 5,055 | 4.86% |
| South Asian | 3,850 | 3.38% | 2,760 | 2.51% | 2,310 | 2.22% |
| Latin American | 3,330 | 2.93% | 1,975 | 1.8% | 1,950 | 1.88% |
| African | 2,165 | 1.9% | 1,685 | 1.53% | 1,445 | 1.39% |
| Middle Eastern (Note: Statistic includes total responses of "West Asian" and "Arab" under visible minority section on census.) | 1,710 | 1.5% | 1,065 | 0.97% | 835 | 0.8% |
| Other (Note: Statistic includes total responses of "Visible minority, n.i.e." and "Multiple visible minorities" under visible minority section on census.) | 3,320 | 2.92% | 2,115 | 1.92% | 1,925 | 1.85% |
| Total responses | 113,805 | 95.9% | 109,905 | 94.97% | 103,920 | 94.39% |
| Total population | 118,675 | 100% | 115,724 | 100% | 110,097 | 100% |
Notes: Totals greater than 100% due to multiple origin responses. Demographics based on 2012 Canadian federal electoral redistribution riding boundaries.

== History ==
The electoral district was created in 1933 from Vancouver South and Vancouver—Burrard ridings.

Vancouver East was one two electoral districts in British Columbia that saw no changes to its boundaries proposed following the 2012 federal electoral boundaries redistribution.

=== Historical boundaries ===
1933 representation order

1947 representation order

1952 representation order

1966 representation order

1976 representation order

1987 representation order

1996 representation order

2003 representation order

2013 representation order

2023 representation order

== Members of Parliament ==
| Parliament | Years | Member | Party |
|---|---|---|---|
Vancouver East; Riding created from Vancouver South and Vancouver—Burrard
| 18th | 1935–1940 | Angus MacInnis | Co-operative Commonwealth |
| 19th | 1940–1945 | Angus MacInnis | Co-operative Commonwealth |
| 20th | 1945–1949 | Angus MacInnis | Co-operative Commonwealth |
| 21st | 1949–1953 | Angus MacInnis | Co-operative Commonwealth |
| 22nd | 1953–1957 | Harold Edward Winch | Co-operative Commonwealth |
| 23rd | 1957–1958 | Harold Edward Winch | Co-operative Commonwealth |
| 24th | 1958–1961 | Harold Edward Winch | Co-operative Commonwealth |
| 24th | 1961–1962 | Harold Edward Winch | New Democratic |
| 25th | 1962–1963 | Harold Edward Winch | New Democratic |
| 26th | 1963–1965 | Harold Edward Winch | New Democratic |
| 27th | 1965–1968 | Harold Edward Winch | New Democratic |
| 28th | 1968–1972 | Harold Edward Winch | New Democratic |
| 29th | 1972–1974 | Paddy Neale | New Democratic |
| 30th | 1974–1979 | Art Lee | Liberal |
| 31st | 1979–1980 | Margaret Mitchell | New Democratic |
| 32nd | 1980–1984 | Margaret Mitchell | New Democratic |
| 33rd | 1984–1988 | Margaret Mitchell | New Democratic |
| 34th | 1988–1993 | Margaret Mitchell | New Democratic |
| 35th | 1993–1997 | Anna Terrana | Liberal |
| 36th | 1997–2000 | Libby Davies | New Democratic |
| 37th | 2000–2004 | Libby Davies | New Democratic |
| 38th | 2004–2006 | Libby Davies | New Democratic |
| 39th | 2006–2008 | Libby Davies | New Democratic |
| 40th | 2008–2011 | Libby Davies | New Democratic |
| 41st | 2011–2015 | Libby Davies | New Democratic |
| 42nd | 2015–2019 | Jenny Kwan | New Democratic |
| 43rd | 2019–2021 | Jenny Kwan | New Democratic |
| 44th | 2021–2025 | Jenny Kwan | New Democratic |
| 45th | 2025–present | Jenny Kwan | New Democratic |

=== Current member of Parliament ===
Its member of Parliament (MP) is Jenny Kwan. Kwan has served in the House of Commons since 2015. Prior to her federal service, she was a member of Vancouver City Council and the Legislative Assembly of British Columbia. She is a member of the New Democratic Party.

== Election results ==
Graph of election results in Vancouver East (minor parties that did not receive 2% of the vote or did not run consistently are omitted) View source data.

2025 Canadian federal election
| Party | Candidate | Votes | % | ±% | Expenditures |
|---|---|---|---|---|---|
| New Democratic | Jenny Kwan | 24,945 | 43.65 | –12.75 | $105,327.15 |
| Liberal | Mark Wiens | 20,287 | 35.50 | +15.74 | $81,558.63 |
| Conservative | Lita Cabal | 10,162 | 17.78 | +6.89 | $49,685.80 |
| Green | Nikida Steel | 1,099 | 1.92 | –5.80 | $5,921.43 |
| People's | Meghan Emily Murphy | 329 | 0.58 | –2.21 | $1,941.84 |
| Communist | Kimball Cariou | 329 | 0.58 | –0.20 | none listed |
| Total valid votes/expense limit | | 57,151 | 99.40 | – | $136,600.15 |
| Total rejected ballots | | 347 | 0.60 | –0.45 | |
| Turnout | | 57,498 | 62.70 | +7.85 | |
| Eligible voters | | 91,705 | | | |
| New Democratic hold | | Swing | | –14.25 | |
Source: Elections Canada

2021 Canadian federal election
| Party | Candidate | Votes | % | ±% | Expenditures |
|---|---|---|---|---|---|
| New Democratic | Jenny Kwan | 27,969 | 56.40 | +3.83 | $67,138.66 |
| Liberal | Josh Vander Vies | 9,797 | 19.76 | +1.62 | $42,946.92 |
| Conservative | Mauro Francis | 5,399 | 10.89 | –1.20 | $9,491.11 |
| Green | Cheryl Matthew | 3,826 | 7.72 | –6.78 | $5,835.22 |
| People's | Karin Litzcke | 1,382 | 2.79 | +1.57 | $3,823.14 |
| Libertarian | Gölök Buday | 831 | 1.68 | +0.67 | none listed |
| Communist | Natasha Hale | 387 | 0.78 | +0.46 | none listed |
| Total valid votes/expense limit | | 49,591 | 98.95 | – | $119,373.85 |
| Total rejected ballots | | 528 | 1.05 | +0.10 | |
| Turnout | | 50,119 | 54.85 | –5.43 | |
| Eligible voters | | 91,371 | | | |
| New Democratic hold | | Swing | | +1.10 | |
Source: Elections Canada

2019 Canadian federal election
| Party | Candidate | Votes | % | ±% | Expenditures |
|---|---|---|---|---|---|
| New Democratic | Jenny Kwan | 29,236 | 52.57 | +2.64 | $84,286.14 |
| Liberal | Kyle Demes | 10,085 | 18.13 | –10.02 | $25,852.88 |
| Green | Bridget Burns | 8,062 | 14.50 | +5.31 | $51,975.81 |
| Conservative | Chris Corsetti | 6,724 | 12.09 | +1.32 | $4,528.19 |
| People's | Karin Litzcke | 679 | 1.22 | – | $5,873.34 |
| Libertarian | Gölök Buday | 562 | 1.01 | – | $182.20 |
| Communist | Peter Marcus | 177 | 0.32 | –0.58 | $476.56 |
| Marxist–Leninist | Anne Jamieson | 86 | 0.15 | –0.21 | none listed |
| Total valid votes/expense limit | | 55,611 | 99.04 | – | $116,776.71 |
| Total rejected ballots | | 537 | 0.96 | +0.27 | |
| Turnout | | 56,148 | 60.28 | –5.90 | |
| Eligible voters | | 93,146 | | | |
| New Democratic hold | | Swing | | +6.33 | |
Source: Elections Canada

2015 Canadian federal election
| Party | Candidate | Votes | % | ±% | Expenditures |
|---|---|---|---|---|---|
| New Democratic | Jenny Kwan | 29,316 | 49.94 | –12.89 | $107,948.45 |
| Liberal | Edward Wong | 16,532 | 28.16 | +18.25 | $103,236.57 |
| Conservative | James Low | 6,322 | 10.77 | –8.13 | $10,430.75 |
| Green | Wes Regan | 5,395 | 9.19 | +1.54 | $29,914.97 |
| Communist | Peter Marcus | 525 | 0.89 | – | none listed |
| Independent | D. Alex Millar | 216 | 0.37 | – | $487.05 |
| Marxist–Leninist | Anne Jamieson | 214 | 0.36 | –0.35 | none listed |
| Pirate | Shawn Vulliez | 188 | 0.32 | – | none listed |
| Total valid votes/expense limit | | 58,708 | 99.31 | – | $226,454.95 |
| Total rejected ballots | | 405 | 0.69 | +0.07 | |
| Turnout | | 59,113 | 66.18 | +11.76 | |
| Eligible voters | | 89,324 | | | |
| New Democratic hold | | Swing | | −15.57 | |
Source: Elections Canada

2011 Canadian federal election
| Party | Candidate | Votes | % | ±% | Expenditures |
|---|---|---|---|---|---|
| New Democratic | Libby Davies | 27,794 | 62.83 | +8.43 | $60,644.52 |
| Conservative | Irene C. Yatco | 8,361 | 18.90 | +3.35 | $47,225.79 |
| Liberal | Roma Ahi | 4,382 | 9.91 | –7.32 | $29,207.66 |
| Green | Douglas Roy | 3,383 | 7.65 | –3.73 | $856.80 |
| Marxist–Leninist | Anne Jamieson | 318 | 0.72 | +0.31 | none listed |
| Total valid votes/expense limit | | 44,238 | 99.38 | – | $87,288.86 |
| Total rejected ballots | | 275 | 0.62 | –0.03 | |
| Turnout | | 44,513 | 54.42 | +0.91 | |
| Eligible voters | | 81,801 | | | |
| New Democratic hold | | Swing | | +2.52 | |
Source: Elections Canada

2008 Canadian federal election
| Party | Candidate | Votes | % | ±% | Expenditures |
|---|---|---|---|---|---|
| New Democratic | Libby Davies | 22,506 | 54.40 | –2.17 | $68,418.27 |
| Liberal | Ken Low | 7,127 | 17.23 | –6.20 | $56,858.66 |
| Conservative | Ryan Warawa | 6,432 | 15.55 | +2.23 | $47,151.05 |
| Green | Mike Carr | 4,708 | 11.38 | +5.38 | $1,822.17 |
| Work Less | Betty Krawczyk | 425 | 1.03 | – | none listed |
| Marxist–Leninist | Anne Jamieson | 171 | 0.41 | – | none listed |
| Total valid votes/expense limit | | 41,369 | 99.35 | – | $83,046.63 |
| Total rejected ballots | | 270 | 0.65 | +0.18 | |
| Turnout | | 41,639 | 53.51 | –1.91 | |
| Eligible voters | | 77,817 | | | |
| New Democratic hold | | Swing | | +2.02 | |
Source: Elections Canada

2006 Canadian federal election
| Party | Candidate | Votes | % | ±% | Expenditures |
|---|---|---|---|---|---|
| New Democratic | Libby Davies | 23,927 | 56.57 | +0.11 | $74,944.23 |
| Liberal | David Carl Haggard | 9,907 | 23.42 | –2.50 | $21,324.95 |
| Conservative | Elizabeth M. Pagtakhan | 5,631 | 13.31 | +3.31 | $42,143.51 |
| Green | Christine Ellis | 2,536 | 6.00 | +0.30 | $256.26 |
| Canadian Action | Bryce Bartholomew | 293 | 0.69 | – | $76.38 |
| Total valid votes/expense limit | | 42,294 | 99.53 | – | $77,436.13 |
| Total rejected ballots | | 200 | 0.47 | –0.26 | |
| Turnout | | 42,494 | 55.42 | –2.74 | |
| Eligible voters | | 76,678 | | | |
| New Democratic hold | | Swing | | +1.30 | |
Source: Elections Canada

2004 Canadian federal election
| Party | Candidate | Votes | % | ±% | Expenditures |
|---|---|---|---|---|---|
| New Democratic | Libby Davies | 23,452 | 56.46 | +14.19 | $59,440.98 |
| Liberal | Shirley Chan | 10,768 | 25.93 | –7.81 | $65,940.89 |
| Conservative | Harvey Grigg | 4,153 | 10.00 | –7.53 | $44,655.43 |
| Green | Ron Plowright | 2,365 | 5.69 | +3.24 | $1,410.37 |
| Marijuana | Marc Boyer | 399 | 0.96 | –0.86 | none listed |
| Christian Heritage | Gloria Kieler | 250 | 0.60 | +0.24 | none listed |
| Independent | Louis James Lesosky | 147 | 0.35 | –0.50 | none listed |
| Total valid votes/expense limit | | 41,534 | 99.27 | – | $73,858.98 |
| Total rejected ballots | | 305 | 0.73 | –0.37 | |
| Turnout | | 41,839 | 58.16 | +2.28 | |
| Eligible voters | | 71,942 | | | |
| New Democratic hold | | Swing | | +11.00 | |
Conservative vote is compared to the total of the Canadian Alliance and Progressive Conservative vote in the 2000 election.
Source: Elections Canada

2000 Canadian federal election
| Party | Candidate | Votes | % | ±% | Expenditures |
|---|---|---|---|---|---|
| New Democratic | Libby Davies | 16,818 | 42.28 | +0.02 | $56,481 |
| Liberal | Mason Loh | 13,421 | 33.74 | –3.33 | $58,199 |
| Alliance | Sal Vetro | 5,536 | 13.92 | +1.81 | $14,808 |
| Progressive Conservative | Michael Walsh | 1,439 | 3.62 | +0.89 | $7,603 |
| Green | Kelly Elizabeth White | 975 | 2.45 | –1.00 | $177 |
| Marijuana | David Malmo-Levine | 724 | 1.82 | – | none listed |
| Canadian Action | Brian Bacon | 432 | 1.09 | – | none listed |
| Independent | Edna Mathilda Brass | 196 | 0.49 | –0.30 | $2,648 |
| Independent | Gloria Kieler | 143 | 0.36 | –0.44 | none listed |
| Natural Law | Rosemary Galte | 97 | 0.24 | –0.28 | none listed |
| Total valid votes | | 39,781 | 98.90 | | |
| Total rejected ballots | | 444 | 1.10 | –0.02 | |
| Turnout | | 40,225 | 55.88 | –4.01 | |
| Eligible voters | | 71,989 | | | |
| New Democratic hold | | Swing | | +1.68 | |
Canadian Alliance vote is compared to the Reform Party vote in the 1997 election.
Source: Elections Canada

1997 Canadian federal election
| Party | Candidate | Votes | % | ±% | Expenditures |
|---|---|---|---|---|---|
| New Democratic | Libby Davies | 14,961 | 42.25 | +11.07 | $52,043 |
| Liberal | Anna Terrana | 13,123 | 37.06 | +1.08 | $52,663 |
| Reform | Keith Mitchell | 4,287 | 12.11 | +0.30 | $11,525 |
| Green | Stuart Parker | 1,221 | 3.45 | +2.01 | $2,871 |
| Progressive Conservative | Jerry Cikes | 964 | 2.72 | –6.08 | $5,167 |
| Christian Heritage | Gloria Kieler | 226 | 0.64 | – | $844 |
| Natural Law | Wayne A. Melvin | 185 | 0.52 | –0.45 | none listed |
| Independent | Kimball Cariou | 161 | 0.45 | –0.41 | $5,097 |
| Marxist–Leninist | Charles Boylan | 158 | 0.45 | +0.23 | none listed |
| Independent | Ryan Bloc Québécois Bigge | 121 | 0.34 | – | none listed |
| Total valid votes | | 35,407 | 98.87 | | |
| Total rejected ballots | | 403 | 1.13 | –0.27 | |
| Turnout | | 35,810 | 59.88 | +2.14 | |
| Eligible voters | | 59,801 | | | |
| New Democratic gain from Liberal | | Swing | | +5.00 | |
Source: Elections Canada

1993 Canadian federal election
| Party | Candidate | Votes | % | ±% |
|---|---|---|---|---|
| Liberal | Anna Terrana | 14,237 | 35.98 | +6.21 |
| New Democratic | Margaret Mitchell | 12,339 | 31.19 | –20.02 |
| Reform | Joan Stewart | 4,671 | 11.81 | – |
| Progressive Conservative | Susan Tom | 3,484 | 8.81 | –7.10 |
| National | Bruce Frank Wright | 2,419 | 6.11 | – |
| Libertarian | J. Wayne Marsden | 802 | 2.03 | +1.32 |
| Green | Kelly Elizabeth White | 571 | 1.44 | +0.42 |
| Natural Law | David Grayson | 383 | 0.97 | – |
| Independent | Kimball Cariou | 343 | 0.87 | – |
| Independent | Will Offley | 98 | 0.25 | – |
| Marxist–Leninist | Brian Sproule | 84 | 0.21 | – |
| Independent | Joe Young | 75 | 0.19 | – |
| Independent | Alan Imrie | 59 | 0.14 | – |
| Total valid votes | | 39,565 | 98.61 | |
| Total rejected ballots | | 558 | 1.39 | +0.41 |
| Turnout | | 40,123 | 57.83 | –10.64 |
| Eligible voters | | 69,381 | | |
| Liberal gain from New Democratic | | Swing | | +13.12 |
Source: Elections Canada

1988 Canadian federal election
| Party | Candidate | Votes | % | ±% |
|---|---|---|---|---|
| New Democratic | Margaret Mitchell | 20,108 | 51.20 | –0.59 |
| Liberal | Raymond Leung | 11,692 | 29.77 | +4.40 |
| Progressive Conservative | Paul E. Nielsen | 6,248 | 15.91 | –4.32 |
| Green | Robert J. Light | 401 | 1.02 | – |
| Libertarian | Heinz Holzschuher | 278 | 0.71 | –0.22 |
| Rhinoceros | Ruff Tuff Duff Duff Scott | 277 | 0.71 | –0.25 |
| Communist | Kim C. Zander | 180 | 0.46 | –0.27 |
| Independent | Cheryl Stephens Soroka | 88 | 0.22 | – |
| Total valid votes | | 39,272 | 99.01 | |
| Total rejected ballots | | 391 | 0.99 | –0.01 |
| Turnout | | 39,663 | 68.47 | –3.43 |
| Eligible voters | | 57,924 | | |
| New Democratic hold | | Swing | | –2.50 |
Source: Elections Canada

1984 Canadian federal election
| Party | Candidate | Votes | % | ±% |
|---|---|---|---|---|
| New Democratic | Margaret Mitchell | 18,464 | 51.79 | +7.88 |
| Liberal | Shirley Maple Wong | 9,044 | 25.37 | –14.64 |
| Progressive Conservative | Jack Volrich | 7,210 | 20.22 | +5.61 |
| Rhinoceros | Cameron H. McCabe | 342 | 0.96 | +0.35 |
| Libertarian | Sandy MacDonald | 330 | 0.93 | – |
| Communist | Miguel Figueroa | 259 | 0.73 | +0.17 |
| Total valid votes | | 35,649 | 99.01 | |
| Total rejected ballots | | 358 | 0.99 | +0.14 |
| Turnout | | 36,007 | 71.90 | +8.55 |
| Eligible voters | | 50,076 | | |
| New Democratic hold | | Swing | | +11.26 |
Source: Elections Canada

1980 Canadian federal election
| Party | Candidate | Votes | % | ±% |
|---|---|---|---|---|
| New Democratic | Margaret Mitchell | 14,245 | 43.91 | +1.21 |
| Liberal | Arthur John "Art" Lee | 12,979 | 40.01 | +0.97 |
| Progressive Conservative | David N. Kilbey | 4,742 | 14.62 | –1.92 |
| Rhinoceros | Dandy Randy Lyttle | 198 | 0.61 | – |
| Communist | J. Fred Wilson | 179 | 0.55 | +0.02 |
| Independent | Paul Tetreault | 61 | 0.19 | – |
| Marxist–Leninist | Chaouac Ferron | 34 | 0.10 | –0.03 |
| Total valid votes | | 32,438 | 99.14 | |
| Total rejected ballots | | 280 | 0.86 | +0.28 |
| Turnout | | 32,718 | 63.35 | –7.51 |
| Eligible voters | | 51,646 | | |
| New Democratic hold | | Swing | | +0.12 |
Source: Elections Canada

1979 Canadian federal election
| Party | Candidate | Votes | % | ±% |
|---|---|---|---|---|
| New Democratic | Margaret Mitchell | 13,697 | 42.71 | +6.44 |
| Liberal | Arthur John "Art" Lee | 12,522 | 39.04 | +2.57 |
| Progressive Conservative | Cecil H. Leng | 5,304 | 16.54 | –8.91 |
| Social Credit | Carlo Dallavalle | 334 | 1.04 | – |
| Communist | J. Fred Wilson | 170 | 0.53 | –0.59 |
| Marxist–Leninist | Brian Sproule | 44 | 0.14 | –0.55 |
| Total valid votes | | 32,071 | 99.42 | |
| Total rejected ballots | | 187 | 0.58 | –0.17 |
| Turnout | | 32,258 | 70.86 | +6.55 |
| Eligible voters | | 45,526 | | |
| New Democratic gain from Liberal | | Swing | | +1.94 |
Source: Elections Canada

1974 Canadian federal election
| Party | Candidate | Votes | % | ±% |
|---|---|---|---|---|
| Liberal | Arthur John "Art" Lee | 9,671 | 36.48 | +5.13 |
| New Democratic | Paddy Neale | 9,614 | 36.26 | –12.55 |
| Progressive Conservative | Hartley Hubbs | 6,747 | 25.45 | +8.91 |
| Communist | Maurice Rush | 298 | 1.12 | +0.38 |
| Marxist–Leninist | Charles Boylan | 181 | 0.68 | – |
| Total valid votes | | 26,511 | 99.25 | |
| Total rejected ballots | | 200 | 0.75 | –2.08 |
| Turnout | | 26,711 | 64.31 | –1.94 |
| Eligible voters | | 41,537 | | |
| Liberal gain from New Democratic | | Swing | | +8.84 |
Source: Library of Parliament

1972 Canadian federal election
| Party | Candidate | Votes | % | ±% |
|---|---|---|---|---|
| New Democratic | Paddy Neale | 13,525 | 48.81 | –1.20 |
| Liberal | John Minichiello | 8,687 | 31.35 | –5.21 |
| Progressive Conservative | John G. Balan | 4,584 | 16.54 | +7.63 |
| Social Credit | Walter Stunder | 613 | 2.21 | –0.51 |
| Independent | Maurice Rush | 206 | 0.74 | – |
| Independent | Ian R. Hyman | 92 | 0.33 | – |
| Total valid votes | | 27,707 | 97.17 | |
| Total rejected ballots | | 808 | 2.83 | +1.56 |
| Turnout | | 28,515 | 66.25 | +0.71 |
| Eligible voters | | 43,043 | | |
| New Democratic hold | | Swing | | +2.00 |
Source: Library of Parliament

1968 Canadian federal election
| Party | Candidate | Votes | % | ±% |
|---|---|---|---|---|
| New Democratic | Harold Winch | 13,339 | 50.02 | –6.87 |
| Liberal | Robert Kennedy | 9,750 | 36.56 | +17.51 |
| Progressive Conservative | Max E. Meyer | 2,377 | 8.91 | –0.21 |
| Social Credit | P. Daniel Emanuele | 726 | 2.72 | –10.91 |
| Communist | Charles Caron | 477 | 1.79 | – |
| Total valid votes | | 26,669 | 98.72 | |
| Total rejected ballots | | 345 | 1.28 | +0.13 |
| Turnout | | 27,014 | 65.54 | –2.28 |
| Eligible voters | | 41,219 | | |
| New Democratic hold | | Swing | | –12.19 |
Source: Library of Parliament

1965 Canadian federal election
| Party | Candidate | Votes | % | ±% |
|---|---|---|---|---|
| New Democratic | Harold Winch | 11,854 | 56.89 | +2.59 |
| Liberal | Alexander Charles Sharp | 3,969 | 19.05 | –4.65 |
| Social Credit | Walter W. Campbell | 2,840 | 13.63 | +5.91 |
| Progressive Conservative | Gladys Guy Chong | 1,900 | 9.12 | –5.16 |
| Progressive Workers | Jerry Le Bourdais | 274 | 1.31 | – |
| Total valid votes | | 20,837 | 98.86 | |
| Total rejected ballots | | 241 | 1.14 | +0.17 |
| Turnout | | 21,078 | 67.82 | –6.10 |
| Eligible voters | | 31,080 | | |
| New Democratic hold | | Swing | | +3.62 |
Source: Library of Parliament

1963 Canadian federal election
| Party | Candidate | Votes | % | ±% |
|---|---|---|---|---|
| New Democratic | Harold Winch | 12,688 | 54.30 | –0.04 |
| Liberal | Alexander Charles Sharp | 5,538 | 23.70 | +4.10 |
| Progressive Conservative | Gladys Guy Chong | 3,335 | 14.27 | –0.69 |
| Social Credit | Dorothy Jean Munnik | 1,804 | 7.72 | –0.51 |
| Total valid votes | | 23,365 | 99.03 | |
| Total rejected ballots | | 229 | 0.97 | –0.42 |
| Turnout | | 23,594 | 73.92 | +0.60 |
| Eligible voters | | 31,920 | | |
| New Democratic hold | | Swing | | –2.07 |
Source: Library of Parliament

1962 Canadian federal election
| Party | Candidate | Votes | % | ±% |
|---|---|---|---|---|
| New Democratic | Harold Winch | 12,329 | 54.35 | +5.79 |
| Liberal | Marino Culos | 4,447 | 19.60 | +10.41 |
| Progressive Conservative | Oris Kirk | 3,395 | 14.97 | –21.62 |
| Social Credit | Michael John McCann | 1,867 | 8.23 | +2.57 |
| Communist | Tom McEwen | 648 | 2.86 | – |
| Total valid votes | | 22,686 | 98.61 | |
| Total rejected ballots | | 319 | 1.39 | +0.30 |
| Turnout | | 23,005 | 73.31 | +3.29 |
| Eligible voters | | 31,379 | | |
| New Democratic hold | | Swing | | −2.31 |
New Democrat vote is compared to the Co-operative Commonwealth vote in the 1958 election.
Source: Library of Parliament

1958 Canadian federal election
| Party | Candidate | Votes | % | ±% |
|---|---|---|---|---|
| Co-operative Commonwealth | Harold Winch | 11,486 | 48.56 | +0.97 |
| Progressive Conservative | Norman Douglas Mullins | 8,654 | 36.59 | +18.45 |
| Liberal | Alexander Charles Sharp | 2,175 | 9.20 | –1.64 |
| Social Credit | Michael John McCann | 1,338 | 5.66 | –17.79 |
| Total valid votes | | 23,653 | 98.91 | |
| Total rejected ballots | | 260 | 1.09 | –0.05 |
| Turnout | | 23,913 | 70.02 | +2.05 |
| Eligible voters | | 34,152 | | |
| Co-operative Commonwealth hold | | Swing | | −8.74 |
Source: Library of Parliament

1957 Canadian federal election
| Party | Candidate | Votes | % | ±% |
|---|---|---|---|---|
| Co-operative Commonwealth | Harold Winch | 10,782 | 47.59 | –2.99 |
| Social Credit | John Chmelyk | 5,312 | 23.44 | –0.80 |
| Progressive Conservative | Norman Douglas Mullins | 4,110 | 18.14 | +12.99 |
| Liberal | Alexander Charles Sharp | 2,454 | 10.83 | –5.41 |
| Total valid votes | | 22,658 | 98.86 | |
| Total rejected ballots | | 261 | 1.14 | +0.36 |
| Turnout | | 22,919 | 67.97 | +8.60 |
| Eligible voters | | 33,721 | | |
| Co-operative Commonwealth hold | | Swing | | −1.10 |
Source: Library of Parliament

1953 Canadian federal election
| Party | Candidate | Votes | % | ±% |
|---|---|---|---|---|
| Co-operative Commonwealth | Harold Winch | 10,192 | 50.58 | +3.49 |
| Social Credit | Raymond McCarthy | 4,885 | 24.24 | – |
| Liberal | William Reid | 3,272 | 16.24 | –17.78 |
| Progressive Conservative | Benjamin A.R. Morley | 1,038 | 5.15 | –9.12 |
| Labor–Progressive | Maurice Rush | 764 | 3.79 | –0.82 |
| Total valid votes | | 20,151 | 99.22 | |
| Total rejected ballots | | 159 | 0.78 | –0.51 |
| Turnout | | 20,310 | 59.36 | –0.94 |
| Eligible voters | | 34,214 | | |
| Co-operative Commonwealth hold | | Swing | | −10.38 |
Source: Library of Parliament

1949 Canadian federal election
| Party | Candidate | Votes | % | ±% |
|---|---|---|---|---|
| Co-operative Commonwealth | Angus MacInnis | 14,056 | 47.09 | +2.40 |
| Liberal | William Reid | 10,154 | 34.02 | +12.28 |
| Progressive Conservative | Joseph Friend Day | 4,261 | 14.28 | –5.29 |
| Labor–Progressive | Charles McGregor Stewart | 1,377 | 4.61 | –7.35 |
| Total valid votes | | 29,848 | 98.71 | |
| Total rejected ballots | | 390 | 1.29 | –0.31 |
| Turnout | | 30,238 | 60.30 | –14.28 |
| Eligible voters | | 50,146 | | |
| Co-operative Commonwealth hold | | Swing | | −4.94 |
Source: Library of Parliament

1945 Canadian federal election
| Party | Candidate | Votes | % | ±% |
|---|---|---|---|---|
| Co-operative Commonwealth | Angus MacInnis | 16,003 | 44.69 | +1.71 |
| Liberal | William Reid | 7,786 | 21.74 | –9.90 |
| Progressive Conservative | William Ward | 7,008 | 19.57 | – |
| Labor–Progressive | Harold James Pritchett | 4,283 | 11.96 | +7.15 |
| Democratic | William Nicholas Wallace | 729 | 2.04 | – |
| Total valid votes | | 35,809 | 98.40 | |
| Total rejected ballots | | 584 | 1.60 | +0.42 |
| Turnout | | 36,393 | 74.58 | +0.77 |
| Eligible voters | | 48,797 | | |
| Co-operative Commonwealth hold | | Swing | | +5.80 |
Labor-Progressive vote is compared to the Communist vote in the 1940 election.
Source: Library of Parliament

1940 Canadian federal election
| Party | Candidate | Votes | % | ±% |
|---|---|---|---|---|
| Co-operative Commonwealth | Angus MacInnis | 12,490 | 42.98 | –7.93 |
| Liberal | John Henderson | 9,196 | 31.65 | +5.16 |
| New Democracy | William Wilfred Derpak | 5,975 | 20.56 | – |
| Communist | Fergus McKean | 1,398 | 4.81 | –1.00 |
| Total valid votes | | 29,059 | 98.82 | |
| Total rejected ballots | | 348 | 1.18 | –0.05 |
| Turnout | | 29,407 | 73.81 | –5.18 |
| Eligible voters | | 39,841 | | |
| Co-operative Commonwealth hold | | Swing | | –6.54 |
Source: Library of Parliament

1935 Canadian federal election
| Party | Candidate | Votes | % | ±% |
|---|---|---|---|---|
| Co-operative Commonwealth | Angus MacInnis | 13,629 | 50.91 | – |
| Liberal | Lorne MacDougall | 7,090 | 26.48 | – |
| Conservative | Thomas Todrick | 3,364 | 12.57 | – |
| Communist | Malcolm Bruce | 1,555 | 5.81 | – |
| Reconstruction | Clifford Norman Borton | 1,134 | 4.24 | – |
| Total valid votes | | 26,772 | 98.77 | |
| Total rejected ballots | | 333 | 1.23 | – |
| Turnout | | 27,105 | 79.00 | – |
| Eligible voters | | 34,312 | | |
This riding was created from Vancouver South and Vancouver—Burrard, which elected an Independent Labour and a Liberal, respectively, in the previous election. Angus MacInnis was the Independent Labour incumbent from Vancouver South.
Source: Library of Parliament

== See also ==
- List of Canadian electoral districts
- Historical federal electoral districts of Canada
