= Anna Terrana =

Canadian politician (1937 - present)

Anna Marina Terrana
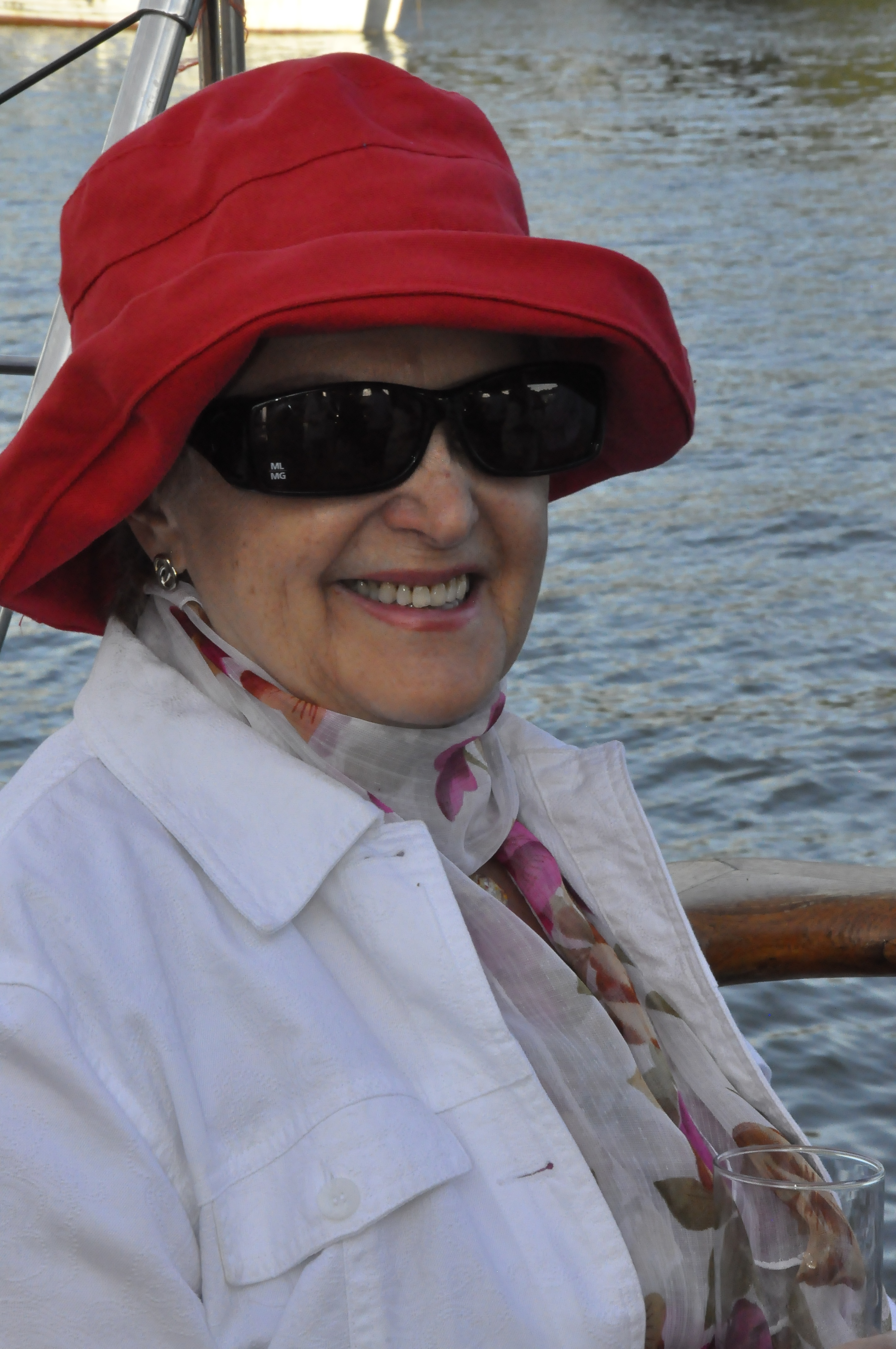
- Terrana at Vancouver Harbour

Member of the Canadian Parliament for Vancouver East
- In office 1993–1997
- Preceded by: Margaret Mitchell
- Succeeded by: Libby Davies

Personal details
- Born: March 31, 1937 (age 89) Turin, Italy
- Party: Liberal
- Children: Son David, daughter-in-law Christine, and two grandchildren, Anthony and Gabrielle.
- Committees: House of Commons Standing Committee on Citizenship and Immigration, House of Commons Standing Committee on Transport, House of Commons Standing Committee on Human Resources Development, the representative of the Minister of Indian and Northern Affairs on the BC Treaty Negotiation Advisory Committee, and a member on each of the House of Commons Task Force on the Rationalization of Canadian National Railway, the House of Commons Task Force on Disability Issues, and the House of Commons Task Force on Jobs and Small Business.

Anna Marina Terrana (born March 31, 1937) was the elected Member of Parliament (MP) for the constituency of Vancouver East in British Columbia, Canada, serving as that riding's MP from 1993 to 1997 in the Canadian House of Commons - 35th Parliament. Terrana sat as a member of the Liberal Party of Canada.

== Biography ==
Born in Turin, Italy, Anna Terrana immigrated to Canada in 1966. Prior to emigrating to Canada, she studied languages and received degrees in English, French, and Italian in Italy and in English and French in England. Before coming to Canada she was employed in Italy for a total of seven years with Pramaggiore, Beloit Italia and North American Aviation S.p.A. As an émigré to Canada, Terrana began a new professional life by teaching English and Italian part time, before she was employed as a Secretary and Assistant at the Immigration Office Of the Roman Catholic Archdiocese of Vancouver, the IOS Investment Company, the Greater Vancouver Community Credit Union and at Simon Fraser University. She then served as the Administrative Assistant of the BC Police Commission from 1974 to 1984 before becoming the executive director of the Italian Cultural Centre Society in Vancouver, Canada from 1987 to 1993. From 1993 to 1991, Anna Terrana was elected as a Member of Parliament and served in the Canadian House Of Commons - 35th Parliament as the elected representative for the constituency of Vancouver East in British Columbia. From 1998 to 2006, Terrana was appointed by the Government of Canada as a Member of the Immigration and Refugee Board of Canada, serving within its Convention Refugee Determination Division.

== As a Member of Parliament (MP) in the 35th Canadian Parliament ==
In 1993, Anna Marina Terrana was elected in a Canadian General Election as the Member of Parliament (MP) for Vancouver East in British Columbia, serving as MP until 1997 as a representative of the Liberal Party of Canada in the 35th Canadian Parliament. Anna Terrana was the first Canadian of Italian origin elected to represent a western Canadian riding in the Canadian House of Commons. While in elected political office, Terrana served as a member on the House of Commons Standing Committee on Citizenship and Immigration, the House of Commons Standing Committee on Transport, and the House of Commons Standing Committee on Human Resources Development. Importantly to her, Terrana sat as the representative of the Minister of Indian and Northern Affairs on the BC Treaty Negotiation Advisory Committee. Terrana also served as a member on the House of Commons Task Force on the Rationalization of Canadian National Railway, on the Task Force on Disability Issues, and on the Task Force on Jobs and Small Business. Additionally, Terrana served as Chair of the House of Commons Canada-Italy Parliamentary Committee, as chairperson for the BC Liberal Caucus and as Treasurer of the National Liberal Women's Caucus, was a member of the Liberal Party of Canada Standing Committee on Policy Development, and sat on many parliamentary sub-committees.

== Key Legislative Accomplishments in the 35th Canadian Parliament ==
One of Anna Terrana's key legislative accomplishments in the 35th Parliament of Canada occurred on December 18, 1996, when Bill C-63 (An Act to amend the Canada Elections Act, the Parliament of Canada Act and the Referendum Act-Chapter 35) of the Liberal Government received Royal Assent. This government bill incorporated and expanded upon Anna Terrana's Private Member's Bill C-307 (An Act to amend the Canada Elections Act (polling hours)) that was introduced in the 35th Parliament, 2nd Session and that proposed staggered voting hours across Canada during Canadian General Elections. The Canadian general election held on June 2, 1997, incorporated a new system of staggered voting hours across Canada that was based on Anna Terrana's Private Member's Bill.

As an MP, Anna Terrana was also an advocate and supporter of equality rights for persons regardless of sexual orientation. She was an early supporter of making changes to the Canadian Human Rights Act to prohibit discrimination on the grounds of sexual orientation. Through the efforts of MPs such as Terrana, in June 1996 Canada's 35th Parliament enacted Bill C-33 (An Act to amend the Canadian Human Rights Act) to include sexual orientation among the Act's prohibited grounds of discrimination.

As the MP for Vancouver East, in which Vancouver's challenged Downtown Eastside (DES) is located, and as the riding's MP at a time when HIV was quickly spreading in the DES due to the sharing of used needles by heroin users, Anna Terrana was involved in the earliest discussions around the consideration at that time of opening safe injection sites in Vancouver's DES as a possible means to reduce the spread of HIV infections.

== Government Appointments – Public Service ==
- 1980-1986: Appointed by the Government of Canada as a Community Board Member on the National Parole Board of Canada
- 1981-1983: Appointed by the Government of Canada as a Member of the Canadian Consultative Council on Multiculturalism
- 1983-1986: Appointed by the City of Vancouver as a Member of the city's Multicultural and Community Committee for the Vancouver 1986 Centennial Commission
- 1985-1986: Appointed by the City of Vancouver as a Commissioner on the Vancouver Centennial Commission
- 1987-1989: Appointed by the City of Vancouver as a Member of the Vancouver Civic Theatre Board
- 1987-1991: Appointed by the Pacific National Exhibition (PNE) in British Columbia as a Member of the PNE Cultural Activities Committee-International Days Chairman (1987, 1988, and 1989), and appointed a Member of the PNE Cultural Activities Committee (1990 and 1991)
- 1988: Selected by the Government of Italy as a Delegate from Canada to the Conference on Emigration held in Rome, Italy (November)
- 1989-1992: Appointed Member, Federal Business Development Bank Ethno Business Council and made an Executive Member and chairman, P.R. Committee for the Small Business Week (1992-1993)
- 1991-1992: Appointed by the Vancouver Police Department to the Vancouver Crime Prevention Society
- 1993: Member, City Plan Eastside Committee, Vancouver
- 1998-2006: Appointed by the Government of Canada as a Member of the Immigration and Refugee Board of Canada, serving within its Convention Refugee Determination Division (now Refugee Protection Division)
- 2009-2014: Member of the Burnaby Task Force on Homelessness.

== Community Affairs ==
Since 1974, Anna Terrana has actively participated in community affairs, sitting on over 40 boards, committees and commissions, both at the Executive and board member level. She has been extensively involved with arts & culture, multicultural, family supports, and public security organisations in Canada. Terrana was instrumental in the construction of the Casa Serena and Villa Carital Senior Citizens’ homes located at the Italian Cultural Centre.

== Community Affairs - With Canada's Italian-Canadian community ==
- 1969-1970: Teacher in charge of the Italian community in Vancouver, Canada for School Canadiana, a pilot project for the teaching of English to new Canadians (now known as ESL)
- 1974-1978: Co-founder and editor of Il Marco Polo Italian monthly periodical in Vancouver, Canada that was published in Italian, English, and French and dealt with local, Canadian, and Italian issues
- 1974-1993: Freelance writer
- 1977-1979: Member of the Board of Directors of the Dante Alighieri Italian Cultural Society in Vancouver
- 1977-1982: Produced Italian radio programs in Vancouver
- 1977-1983: Founded and organized Italian Market Days on Commercial Drive in Vancouver
- 1978-1984: Elected Member from British Columbia for the National Congress of Italian-Canadians
- 1981-83: Member of the Canadian Consultative Council on Multiculturalism
- 1982-84: Vice-president of the National Congress of Italian Canadians
- 1980-82: Vice President of the Italian Cultural Centre Society in Vancouver
- 1982-1991: Writer for IL CENTRO, the bulletin of the Italian Cultural Centre in Vancouver, later to become its co-ordinator and editor
- 1982-86: President of the Italian Cultural Centre Society, Vancouver
- 1984: Member, National Steering Committee of the National Congress of Italian-Canadians
- 1986: Organizer and Co-ordinator, Seventh Biennial conference of National Congress of Italian Canadians
- 1986-1993: Founder and organizer of Italian Week in Vancouver
- 1986-1993: Host of interview programs on Italian T.V., and host and writer of a T.V. program for the Italian Cultural Centre, Vancouver
- 1987-1989: Vice-president, Canadian-Italian Business and Professional Association
- 1989-92: Member of the Ethno-Business Council
- 1986-1988: Co-founder and Member of the Board of Directors of Immigrant and Visible Minority Women of B.C.
- 1991-1997: Interviewer on the Vancouver Italian TV program, Telitalia
- 1992-2013: Member of the Father Emmanuele Rosaia Scholarship Committee
- 1992-1993: Member and Secretary of the board of directors for VILLA CARITAL Continuing Care Society
- 1997-1998: Interviewer (freelance) for Italian radio and T.V. programs, and freelance writer of articles for local, community, and ethnic publications including Italian magazines
- 2000: Member of the Giardino Italiano Committee Board of Directors, Vancouver
- 2007-2008: Member of the Italian Consulate Vancouver Committee on the “Asili nido” Project
- 2009-2021: Member of the executive committee and Board of Directors of the Italian Cultural Centre Senior Citizens’ Housing Society (Casa Serena) in Vancouver, serving as their Treasurer and Secretary (2009 to 2012), vice-president (2012-2014), and President (2014 to 2021)

== Community Affairs - With Canada's multicultural sector ==
- 1976-1980: Member, Board of Directors of the Vancouver Folk Society, serving as Treasurer from 1978 to 1980
- 1984-92: Member, Board of Directors of the Vancouver Multicultural Society, serving as Secretary (1984-1986), vice-president (1986-1990), and President (1990-1992)
- 1985, 1987, & 1989: Chairman, Biennial Vancouver Multicultural Society Distinguished Services Award Dinner
- 1985: Co-chairman, Marconi Museum Fund-raising dinner in Vancouver, Canada
- 1986-1988: Co-founder and board member, Immigrant and Visible Minority Women of B.C.
- 1989-1990: Co-founder and board member, Citizenship Teacher's Network of BC
- 1993: Co-chairman, Ethno Business Council Small Business Week Dinner
- 1993: Appointed Member, Community Advisory Committee Holocaust Education Centre, Vancouver
- Since 1997: Honorary advisor to Japanese School and Japanese Hall of Vancouver
- 1998-1999: Honorary Advisor, Aboriginal Community of B.C. Associates

== Community Affairs - With Canada's arts, culture & sports sectors ==
- 1976: Member, Organizing Committee, BC Games held in Burnaby, B.C., Canada
- Since 1991: Honorary Member, Vancouver Italian Folk Chorus
- 1991-1992: Chairman, “Making a Living, Making a Life” Vancouver Museum 1992 Travelling Exhibit
- Since1992: Honorary Member, Italian Choir of B.C.
- 1997-1999: Member, Board of Directors of the Arts Club Theatre in Vancouver, Canada
- 1998-1999: Honorary Co-chair, Théatre de la Seizième Partners in Education Campaign, Vancouver
- 1998-2000: Member, Board of Directors and Vice President of Vancouver Millennium 2000
- 2003-2005: Member, Board of Directors of the Canadian Vocal and Performing Arts Society

== Community Affairs - With mainstream community organisations in Canada ==
- 1978: Organizer and Co-ordinator, Symposium of British Columbia Provincial Police Commissions
- 1978-1984: Member, Board of Directors, United Way of the Lower Mainland, serving as a Member of the Agency Operations Committee (1978-1984)
- 1978-1980: Member, Board of Directors, Big Brothers of Burnaby, B.C., Canada
- 1979-1984: Member, Board of Directors, Big Brothers of BC and Chairman of the Educational Development Committee
- 1980: Chairman, Entertainment Committee of National Police Educators Conference
- 1981-1982: Organizer and Co-ordinator, B.C. Police Honours Night
- 1982-1984: Member, Board of Directors, Big Brothers of Canada
- 1983: Chairman, Big Brothers of Canada National Convention
- 1984: Assistant Producer, Pre-Papal Mass in Abbotsford, B.C. for visit of Pope John Paul II
- 1989: Member, Mount Saint Joseph Hospital “Dining with a Saint” Committee
- 1989-1991: Member, Board of Directors, Theatre Terrific and Chairman of the Finance Committee (1989-1991)
- 1991: Chairman, Canadian Federation of CIBPA National Convention
- 1991-1993: Vice-president, FAST (Families as Support Teams) International
- 1991-1997: Co-host, B.C. Children's Hospital Telethon - Italian Community
- 1991-2004: Appointed Member, Burnaby Life Advisory Board, Burnaby, B.C., Canada
- 1992-1993: Appointed Member, Vancouver Sun Community Advisory Panel
- 1997: Member, BC Children's Hospital Telethon Committee
- 1997-1999: Cabinet Member, Cottage Hospice Campaign for the St. James Community Services Society
- 2005-2014: Member, Board of Directors, the Duke of Edinburgh Awards Canada and Chair of the Marketing and Public Affairs Committee (2010-2012)
- 2009-2014: Chair, John Gibbard Award Committee
- 2008-2014: Member, Board of Directors, vice-president (2012-2014), and Chair of the John Gibbard Awards Committee (2009-2014) of the United Nations Association in Canada, Vancouver Branch

== Community Affairs - With Canadian Politics ==
- 1983: Chairman, BC Liberal Party Provincial Convention held in Penticton, B.C.
- 1987-1988: Member, Board of Directors, Burnaby Voters’ Association
- 2007-2009: Member, Board of Directors, Team Burnaby Voters Association
- 2009: Allowed her name to be put forward as a council candidate for the Team Burnaby Voters Association in Burnaby, B.C., Canada during the municipal elections held that year in British Columbia.

== Honours and awards ==
- 1981: Recipient of Gold Medal from Vancouver Italian Community
- Since 1982: Honorary Member, Sicilian Folkloristic Club of British Columbia
- 1983: Nominee for the YWCA Women of Distinction Award Vancouver, Canada
- 1986-2006: Honorary Member, Big Sisters of BC Lower Mainland
- Since 1988: Honorary Member, Consultative Council of Immigrant and Visible Minority Women of BC Society
- 1988: Recipient, Order of Italy (Knight of the Italian Republic) from the President of the Italian Republic
- 1988: Recipient, Italo-Canadian of the Year Award, from the Confratellanza Italo-Canadese
- 1988: Appointed to Christopher Columbus Quintecentenary Commission of Canada
- Since 1990: Honorary Member, Bersaglieri National Association (Veteran's Association) Vancouver Chapter
- 1990-1995 editions and 1997 edition: Listed in the British Columbia Book of Who's Who
- 1989: Nominee for the YWCA Women of Distinction Award
- 1990: Recipient of the Bersaglieri hat by the Italian-Canadian Bersaglieri Society
- 1990: Recipient of the Regione Piemonte (Italian Province) Gold Medal for Philanthropic and Humanitarian Activities (International Prize)
- 1991: Honorary Member, Canadian-Italian Business and Professional Association of British Columbia
- 1992: Recipient of Canada 125 Medal (Award to commemorate Canada's 125th Anniversary in 1992)
- 1993-1996: Patron of FAST (Families as Support Teams) International
- 1993: Recipient, Vancouver Multicultural Society Distinguished Service Humanitarian Award
- 1994: Recipient, Plaque from the Piemonte Region of Italy for being the first Piemontese emigrant to be elected to a foreign Parliament
- 1998: Recipient, Award from Vancouver Immigrant and Visible Minority Women
- 1998: Recipient, Immigrant and Visible Minority Women of B.C. “Women who Make a Difference” Award
- 2000: One of 6 recipients of the National Italian Canadian Award given in Ottawa, Canada in the new Millennium to recognize their outstanding work in the 20th century
- 2007: Recipient, Vancouver Italian Cultural Centre Immigrant of the Year Award
- Since 2010: Delegate and Representative in Canada of the Association and International Foundation of the Piemontesi nel Mondo
- 2016: Inducted into the Hall of Fame of the Vancouver Italian Cultural Centre

== Hobbies and family ==
Terrana herself identifies that she enjoys meeting friends, and the theatre, music, and opera. Anna has one son, David, a daughter-in-law, Christine, and two grandchildren, Anthony and Gabrielle.
