= Museum of Veterinary Anatomy FMVZ USP =

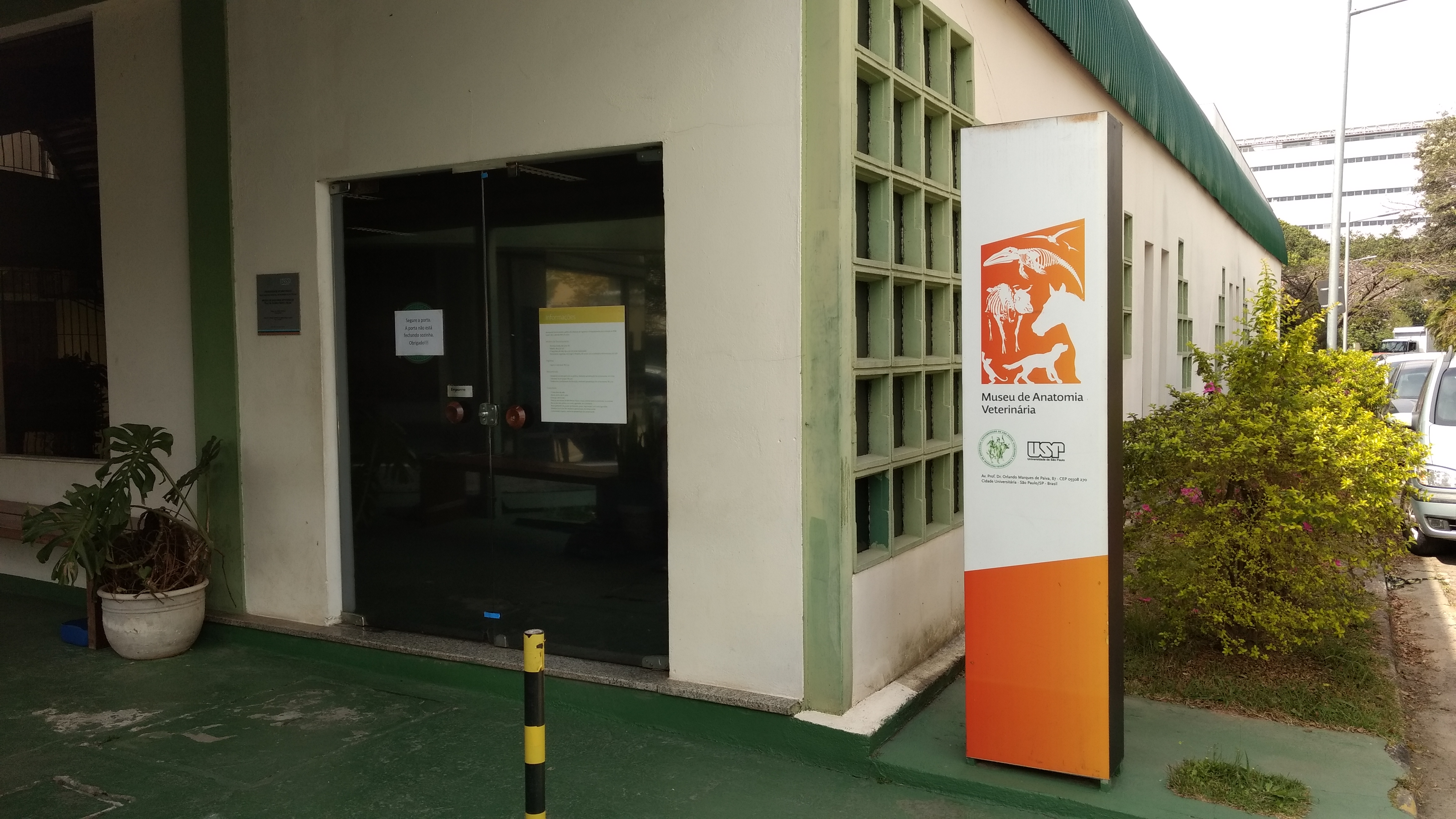
- Main museum entrance
- Established: 1984; 42 years ago
- Location: São Paulo, Brazil
- Coordinates: 23.5694°S 46.7397°W
- Type: Natural history museum
- Website: mav.fmvz.usp.br

The Museum of Veterinary Anatomy (Portuguese: Museu de Anatomia Veterinária Prof. Dr. Plínio Pinto e Silva; MAV) is a museum open to the public at the Faculty of Veterinary Medicine and Animal Science (FMVZ) at the University of São Paulo (USP), Brazil. It was named in honor of Professor Plinio Pinto e Silva, veterinarian and member of the São Paulo Veterinary Medicine Academy, a pioneer in obtaining the associate professor title at the Faculty of Veterinary Medicine of USP. The museum was opened to visitors in 1984 and has a permanent exhibition, studied and curated by teachers, professionals and students of the faculty. Before the museum was opened to visitors, the collection was used by college teachers in their classes. Between 2004 and 2008, the MAV was closed to visitors for the transfer of FMVZ headquarters to USP's college campus (known as Cidade Universitária).

== Collection ==
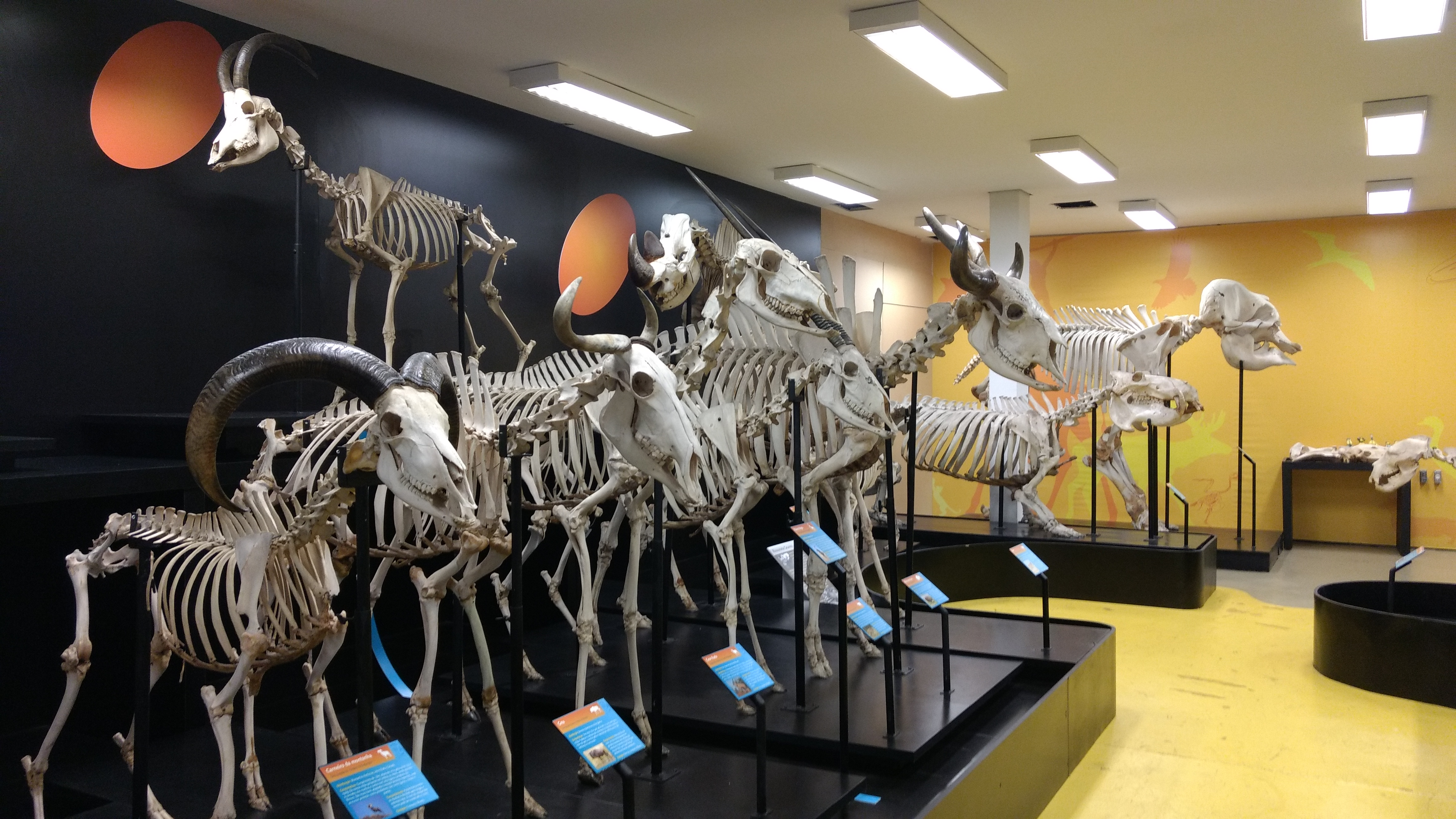

The museum has a collection of about 2,000 objects, including several mounted animals, skeletons and anatomical models of several species. Most pieces are from mammals, with aquatic, flying, marsupials, carnivores, rodents, horses, bovine, swine and primate species among them, including the human species. In addition to a huge skeleton of an Indian elephant, one of the highlights of the collection is the skeleton of a female rhino, known as Cacareco, who lived in São Paulo Zoo and became famous in the municipal elections of October 1959, when she received about 100,000 protest votes. At the time, the election was conducted with paper ballots on which voters wrote the name of their preferred candidate.

=== Exhibitions ===
- Body dimensions: from anatomy to microscopy. This exhibition aims to show in detail the internal and external parts of the animals, with focus on the functioning of organs such as heart, kidney and liver.

== Visitors ==
The Museum of Veterinary Anatomy receives an average of 7,600 visitors per year. About 80% of visitors are from school groups, mostly high school students. As well as visitors from outside the university, the collection attracts students from the college seeking extension and monitoring projects for an experience with the university environment and the museum's collection.

The museum can be visited from Tuesdays to Fridays from 9 am until 5 pm, and Saturdays from 9 am to two o'clock. The museum also has a small souvenir shop.

=== Guide for teachers ===
On 17 October 2015, during the Virada Científica (a type of White Night festival for science events) at University of São Paulo, the MAV Guide for Teachers - Elementary School 1 was launched. The purpose of this publication is to highlight parts of the collection that can be used in classrooms by the school teachers of elementary schools. The guide have 58 illustrated pages and was distributed to teachers participating in a training offered by the museum.
