= Jack Scott (activist) =

John Alexander Scott (May 12, 1910 – December 30, 2000) was an Irish-Canadian union activist and member of the Communist Party of Canada and the Progressive Workers Movement. He authored numerous books on Canadian labour history and founded the Canada-China Friendship Association. He fought for Canada in World War II and was awarded the Croix de Guerre for gallantry under fire. Scott opposed allowing Canadian trade unions to be controlled by U.S.-based unions. He was expelled from the Communist Party because of his support of China during the Sino-Soviet split. Jack Scott became a founder of the Vancouver-based Progressive Workers Movement.

Scott was born on May 12, 1910 in Belfast. He began work on the docks at the age of 14 before emigrating with his family to Canada in 1927.
