= Progressive Workers Movement =

- Abbreviation: PWM
- Leader: Jack Scott
- Founded: 1964
- Dissolved: 1970
- Newspaper: The Progressive Worker
- Ideology: Communism; Marxism–Leninism; Maoism; Anti-revisionism
- Political position: Far-left

The Progressive Workers Movement was a Maoist political organization based in Vancouver, British Columbia, Canada. Jack Scott, a longtime activist who had recently been expelled from the Communist Party of Canada, was a leading figure in the organization. PWM was founded in 1964 and, according to reporter Rob Mickleburgh, "supported the fierce Maoism of the People's Republic of China and the formation of independent Canadian trade unions free of control from U.S.-based unions." The group published a newspaper, The Progressive Worker. Membership peaked at less than 100.

Among its activities was support for workers seeking to organize outside of international unions based in the United States. In one such effort, the PWM aided a breakaway Canadian union, the Canadian Electrical Workers, in their effort to organize electronic plants in British Columbia. The CEW later merged into Canadian Association of Industrial Mechanical and Allied Workers (CAIMAW).

In November 1964, the leadership of the British Columbia New Democratic Party (BCNDP) began the process of expelling members of the PWM, stating "as a result of complaints about a new magazine called The Progressive Worker, disciplinary action under the party constitution is being taken." Among those expelled were Scott, oil worker union activist Jerry LeBourdais, and youth movement activist Gene Craven. The NDP had also recently expelled the Trotskyist League for Socialist Action. In December, the three were officially expelled.

In December 1964, The Province reported that the organization was growing through recruitment among Vancouver's large Chinese-Canadian population, recruiting members of other communist organizations, and had established a relationship with the Progressive Labor Party in the United States.

In the 1965 federal election, Jerry LeBourdais unsuccessfully sought election in Vancouver East riding as the movement's nominee. He won 274 votes, 1.3% of the popular vote.

In April 1968, members of the PWM interrupted a British Columbia Federation of Labour rally and distributed a pamphlet calling on unions to prepare for a general strike against a new law which allowed for compulsory arbitration. The Vancouver Sun wrote of the meeting that "demands for militant action drew prolonged applause from the rank and file unionists present."

The final edition of The Progressive Worker was published in 1970 as a theoretical journal. A number of PWM members joined the Vancouver Study Group (VSG) after its demise.

== See also ==
- List of political parties in Canada
