= Margaret Mitchell (Canadian politician) =

Canadian politician

Member of the Canadian Parliament for Vancouver East
- In office 1979–1993
- Preceded by: Art Lee
- Succeeded by: Anna Terrana

Personal details
- Born: Margaret Anne Learoyd; July 17, 1925 Brockville, Ontario, Canada
- Died: March 8, 2017 (aged 91) Vancouver, British Columbia, Canada
- Party: New Democratic Party
- Education: McMaster University
- Portfolio: Deputy Whip of the NDP (1989–1990)

Margaret Anne Mitchell OBC (née Learoyd; July 17, 1925 – March 8, 2017) was a Canadian social activist and the New Democratic Party (NDP) Member of Parliament (MP) for Vancouver East from 1979 until 1993. A social worker by profession, she was first elected to the House of Commons of Canada in the 1979 federal election. In 1980, she voted against a pay raise for MPs, and subsequently donated her additional pay to charity establishing the Margaret Mitchell Fund for Women.

In Parliament, Mitchell was one of the first politicians to raise the issue of violence against women. She is best remembered for one incident in which male MPs laughed when she demanded that the government take action to stop domestic violence. Recalling the incident two decades later, she said, "I was shocked and furious about that... that was my one claim to fame, and people still come up to me and talk to me about that."

Mitchell graduated from McMaster University with a sociology degree in 1947. From 1952 to 1955, she worked as a social worker for the International Red Cross in Japan, Korea, Australia and Austria. She moved to Vancouver in the 1960s where she worked for the Neighborhood Services Association until 1974. In Parliament, she was variously the NDP's Critic for Immigration, Housing, Status of Women, Health and Welfare and for Multiculturalism and Citizenship. In the 1980s, she attended the United Nations "Decade of Women Conference" in Nairobi. In 1984, she was the first MP to raise the issue of the Chinese head tax in the House of Commons. In the 1993 Canadian federal election, Mitchell lost her seat to Liberal Anna Terrana.

In 2000, Mitchell was recognized as a Member of the Order of British Columbia. Mitchell was a known descendant of former Canadian Prime Minister Sir John Thompson who died in office in 1894 while visiting Queen Victoria at Windsor Castle. She died on March 8, 2017, aged 91.
