= Opinion polling for the 1965 Canadian federal election =

This article is about polls leading up to the 1965 Canadian federal election.

== During the 26th Parliament of Canada ==
Evolution of voting intentions at national level
Polling firm	Last day of survey	Source	LPC	PC	NDP	Other	ME	Sample
Election 1965	November 8, 1965		40.18	32.41	17.91	9.50		
Gallup	November 3, 1965		44	29	18	9	—	—
Gallup	October 1965		47	30	16	7	—	—
Gallup	September 1965		48	28	15	9	—	—
Gallup	July 1965		45	29	15	11	—	—
Gallup	May 1965		45	29	15	11	—	—
Gallup	March 1965		45	29	15	11	—	—
Gallup	January 1965		47	32	12	9	—	—
Gallup	October 1964		47	33	13	7	—	—
Gallup	June 1964		44	34	13	9	—	—
Gallup	April 1964		42	35	13	10	—	—
Gallup	December 1963		42	35	13	10	—	—
Gallup	September 1963		43	35	12	10	—	—
Gallup	July 1963		43	34	13	10	—	—
Election 1963	April 8, 1963		41.48	32.80	13.22	12.50		

== Regional polling ==
=== Quebec ===
Evolution of voting intentions at national level
Polling firm	Last day of survey	Source	LPC	PC	NDP	Other	ME	Sample
Election 1965	November 8, 1965		45.6	21.3	12.0	21.1		
Gallup	July 1965		50	21	12	17	—	—
Gallup	January 1965		54	30	9	17	—	—
Election 1963	April 8, 1963		45.6	19.5	7.1	27.8		

=== Ontario ===
Evolution of voting intentions at national level
Polling firm	Last day of survey	Source	LPC	PC	NDP	Other	ME	Sample
Election 1965	November 8, 1965		43.6	34.0	21.7	0.7		
Gallup	July 1965		48	33	17	2	—	—
Gallup	January 1965		49	35	15	1	—	—
Election 1963	April 8, 1963		45.8	35.0	16.2	3.0		

=== West ===
Evolution of voting intentions at national level
Polling firm	Last day of survey	Source	PC	LPC	NDP	Other	ME	Sample
Election 1965	November 8, 1965		36.03	27.02	23.45	13.50		
Gallup	July 1965		39	28	19	14	—	—
Gallup	January 1965		36	36	15	13	—	—
