= 1965 Canadian federal election =

- November 8, 1965

265 seats in the House of Commons 133 seats needed for a majority
- Opinion polls
- Turnout: 74.8% (▼4.4 pp)
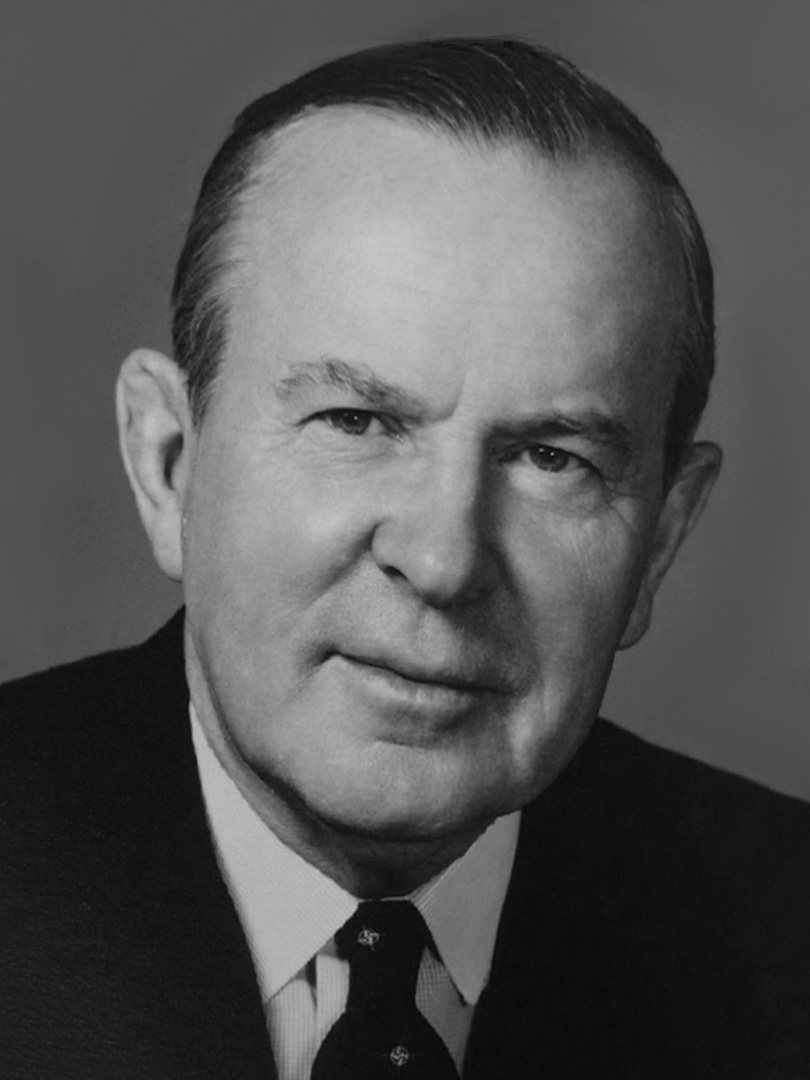

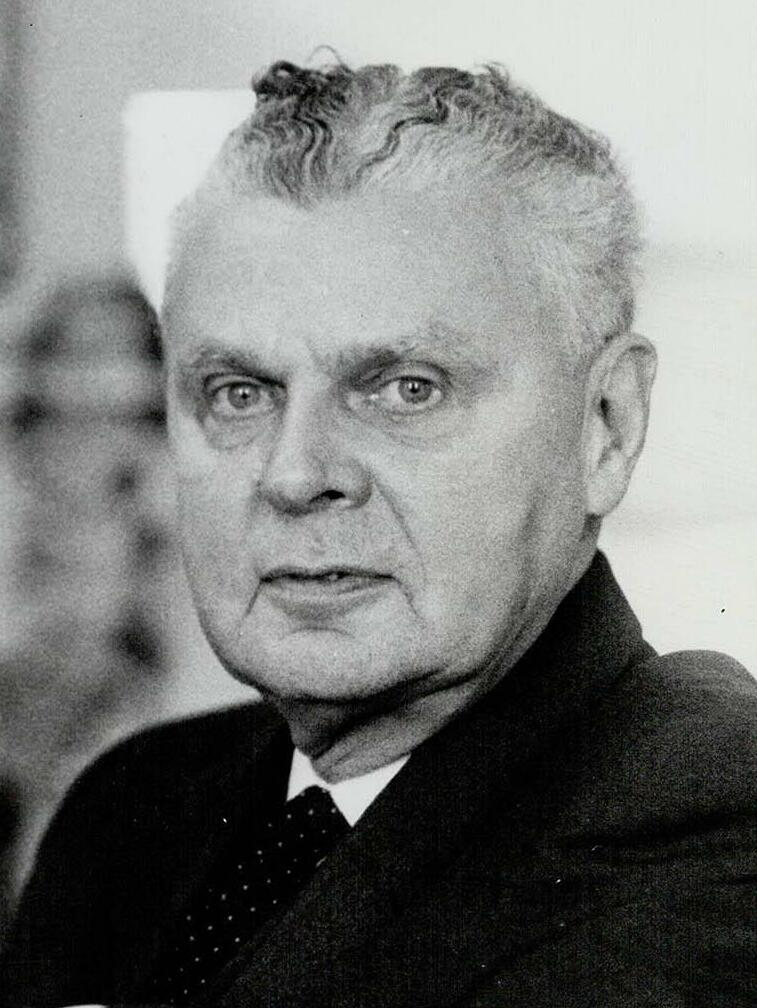

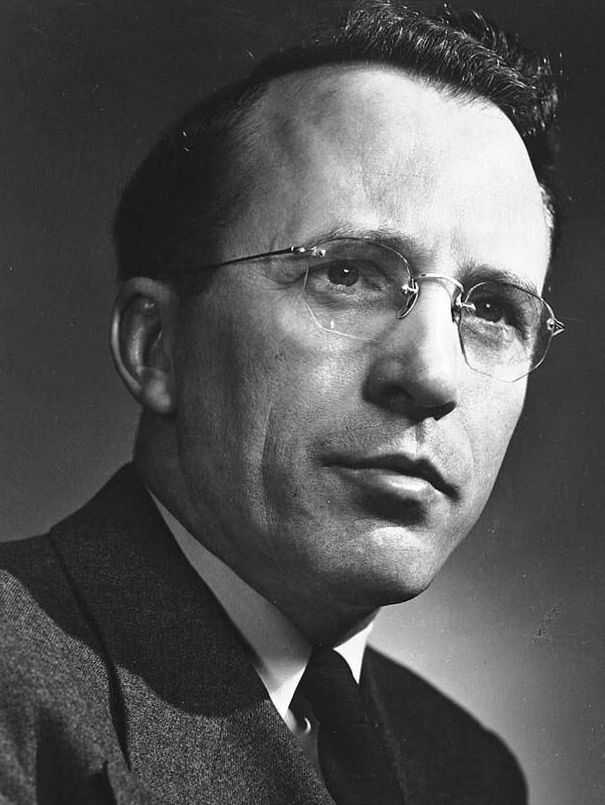

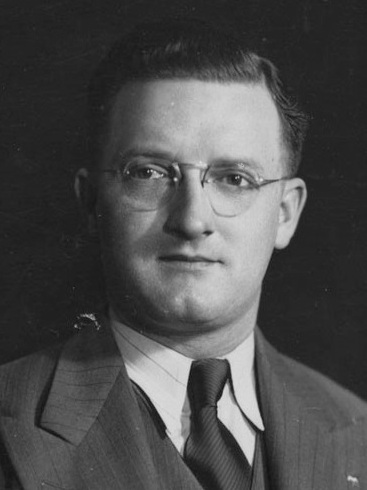
| | First party | Second party | Third party |
|---|---|---|---|
| Leader | Lester B. Pearson | John Diefenbaker | Tommy Douglas |
| Party | Liberal | Progressive Conservative | New Democratic |
| Leader since | January 16, 1958 | December 14, 1956 | August 3, 1961 |
| Leader's seat | Algoma East | Prince Albert | Burnaby—Coquitlam |
| Last election | 128 seats, 41.52% | 95 seats, 32.72% | 17 seats, 13.24% |
| Seats before | 128 | 95 | 17 |
| Seats won | 131 | 97 | 21 |
| Seat change | ▲3 | ▲2 | ▲4 |
| Popular vote | 3,099,521 | 2,500,113 | 1,381,658 |
| Percentage | 40.18% | 32.41% | 17.91% |
| Swing | ▼1.34 pp | ▼0.31 pp | ▲4.67 pp |
| | Fourth party | Fifth party |
| Leader | Réal Caouette | Robert N. Thompson |
| Party | Ralliement créditiste | Social Credit |
| Leader since | September 1, 1963 | July 7, 1961 |
| Leader's seat | Villeneuve | Red Deer |
| Last election | New party (Note: Elected 20 MPs in Quebec as part of the Social Credit Party of Canada.) | 24 seats, 11.92% |
| Seats before | 19 | 4 |
| Seats won | 9 | 5 |
| Seat change | ▼10 | ▲1 |
| Popular vote | 359,258 | 282,454 |
| Percentage | 4.66% (Note: Only contested seats in Quebec and Restigouche—Madawaska and Glengarry—Prescott in New Brunswick and Ontario respectively.) | 3.66% |
| Swing | New party | ▼8.26 pp |

- The Canadian parliament after the 1965 election
Prime Minister before election
Lester B. Pearson
Liberal
Prime Minister after election
Lester B. Pearson
Liberal

The 1965 Canadian federal election was held on November 8, 1965, to elect members of the House of Commons of Canada of the 27th Parliament of Canada. The Liberal Party of Prime Minister Lester B. Pearson was re-elected to government, winning more seats than any other party. It won more seats in the House even though it received a smaller share of the popular vote. It fell short of a majority government. It formed a minority government that due to support from other MPs, lasted three years.

== Overview ==
On September 7, 1965, for the first time ever, the election writ was announced on live television across Canada by Prime Minister Lester Pearson. The networks then broadcast responses to the election announcement from all four House of Commons opposition leaders.

The Liberals campaigned on their record of having kept the promises made in the 1963 campaign, which included job creation, lowering income taxes, higher wages, higher family allowances and student loans. They promised to implement a national Medicare program by 1967, and the Canada Pension Plan system of public pensions. The party also urged voters to give them a majority for "five more years of prosperity". The party campaigned under the slogans, "Good Things Happen When a Government Cares About People", and, "For Continued Prosperity". However, the Liberals came up two seats short of a majority, largely due to being virtually nonexistent in the Prairies for the second consecutive election. They actually lost five seats in the region, the only survivor being Veterans Affairs Minister Roger Teillet.

The Progressive Conservative Party of John Diefenbaker, campaigning with the slogan, "Policies for People, Policies for Progress", gained a small number of seats. Despite losing a second time, Diefenbaker refused to resign as party leader, and was eventually forced from the position by a campaign by the party president Dalton Camp. Diefenbaker subsequently ran for re-election as leader in the party's 1967 leadership convention, but lost to Robert Stanfield.

Old age pensions were an important issue in this campaign. The Liberal Party pointed to having increased the pension to $75 per month for persons 70 years of age and older, planned to reduce the eligibility age to 65 by 1970 and also promised a "Canada Assistance Program" payment for seniors with lower incomes. The PCs promised to increase OAP to $100 per month for all those 70 years old and over.

The New Democratic Party of Tommy Douglas, campaigning under the slogan, "Fed up? Speak up! Vote for the New Democrats!", increased its share of the popular vote by more than four and a half percentage points, and became the third largest party in the House of Commons. However, it won only four more seats as it continued to fail to make the electoral break-through that was hoped for when the party was founded in 1960.

The Social Credit Party of Canada split in two before this election. Réal Caouette led French-Canadian Socreds out of the party into the new Ralliement créditiste (Social Credit Rally) but lost more than half of the party's Quebec seats. Robert N. Thompson continued to lead the Social Credit Party in English-speaking Canada, and actually managed to gain one seat outside Quebec although it was still fewer than the French-Canadian breakaway party. However, even the combined seat totals of the two factions would not have been enough to prevent the NDP from replacing Social Credit as the third largest party. The election would be the last time that the Social Credit Party elected federal candidates outside Quebec.

This was the first election for the Rhinoceros Party of Canada, a satirical party led by Cornelius the First. The party fielded only one candidate. Cornelius, a resident of the Granby zoo, did not seek election because Canadian election law does not permit rhinoceroses (or other zoo animals) to be nominated.

In order to govern, the minority Liberals relied on the New Democratic Party and occasionally other smaller opposition parties in order to remain in power. Pearson announced his intention to resign as Liberal leader in December 1967 and was replaced the following April by Pierre Trudeau. Having served just short of five years, Pearson is the longest-serving Canadian prime minister to have never led a majority government.

Notably, this election marked the last time that a single conservative party did not win an absolute majority of the vote in Alberta (although the totals of the Progressive Conservatives and Social Credit combined did add up to over two thirds of the vote in that province).

== Party platforms ==
Liberal Party:

- $500 million for medical and dental research over 15 years;
- $40 million university scholarship program over 2 years;
- improve crop insurance for farmers;
- create a national dairy marketing board;
- allow full-time farm workers to participate in Unemployment Insurance;
- increase old age security payments;
- $100 million programs to build roads in northern Canada;
- $25 million to support the coal industry in Nova Scotia.

Progressive Conservative Party:

- increase grants to universities;
- special tax deduction for gifts to universities;
- grants to support medical and dental research;
- establish a federal government grain agency;
- provide grants to farmers;
- increase old age security payments from $75 per month to $100 per month for senior citizens over the age of 70;
- create a national water conservation program, and divert water from northern Canada to southern regions;
- develop hydro-electric potential of Nelson River, Peace River and the Bay of Fundy;
- reduce corporate and personal income taxes;
- provide tax deductions for home-owners.

New Democratic Party:

- implement a national medicare program by July 1, 1967;
- eliminate university tuition fees;
- provide grants for universities' capital costs;
- increased funding for technical training;
- increase the minimum price for wheat;
- increase the old age security payment from $75 per month to $100 per month at age 65;
- implement economic planning program that lays down guidelines for wages and prices;
- halt unjustified price increases.

Social Credit Party:

- increased federal aid for education;
- introduce a non-compulsory medicare program;
- require the Bank of Canada to provide loans for government capital projects.

Ralliement des creditistes/Social Credit Rally:

- in lieu of a medicare program, provide government allowance to individuals to buy private medical insurance;
- subsidize farmers' crop losses;
- increase old age security payments to $100 per month immediately, and to $125 per month over time;
- require the Bank of Canada to pay $15 million of dividends to Canadians.

Source: The Globe and Mail newspaper, October 1965.

== Electoral system ==
Most MPs were elected using First-past-the-post voting. But Halifax and the riding of Queen's (PEI) were two-seat districts, electing their MPs using plurality block voting. After this election, single-winner first past the post would be the only electoral system used to elect MPs.

== National results ==

| Party | Party leader | # of candidates | Seats | | | | Popular vote | | |
|---|---|---|---|---|---|---|---|---|---|
| Party | Party leader | # of candidates | 1963 | Dissolution | Elected | % Change | # | % | Change |
| Liberal | Lester Pearson | 265 | 128 | 128 | 131 | +2.3% | 3,099,521 | 40.18% | -1.34pp |
| Progressive Conservative | John Diefenbaker | 265 | 95 | 95 | 97 | +4.3% | 2,500,113 | 32.41% | -0.31pp |
| New Democrats | Tommy Douglas | 255 | 17 | 17 | 21 | +23.5% | 1,381,658 | 17.91% | +4.67pp |
| Ralliement créditiste | Real Caouette | 77 | | 19 | 9 | -47.4% | 359,258 | 4.66% | |
| Social Credit | R.N. Thompson | 86 | 24 | 4 | 5 | -79% | 282,454 | 3.66% | -8.26pp |
| Independent | | 24 | | - | 1 | | 52,155 | 0.68% | +0.61pp |
| Independent PC | | 4 | - | - | 1 | | 13,198 | 0.17% | +0.15pp |
| Independent Liberal | | 10 | - | - | - | - | 16,738 | 0.22% | +0.03pp |
| Communist | William Kashtan | 12 | - | - | - | - | 4,285 | 0.06% | x |
| New Capitalist | Frank O'Hearn | 3 | | | - | | 1,009 | 0.01% | |
| Ouvrier Indépendant | | 2 | - | - | - | - | 650 | 0.01% | -0.01pp |
| Droit vital personnel | H-G Grenier | 1 | | | - | | 465 | 0.01% | |
| Independent Social Credit | | 2 | - | - | - | - | 422 | 0.01% | x |
| Independent Conservative | | 1 | - | - | - | - | 373 | x | x |
| Rhinoceros | Cornelius I | 1 | | | - | | 321 | x | |
| Republican | | 1 | | | - | | 297 | x | |
| Progressive Workers | | 1 | | | - | | 274 | x | |
| Socialist Labour | | 1 | - | - | - | - | 147 | x | x |
| Total | | 1,011 | 265 | 265 | 265 | - | 7,713,338 | 100% | |
Sources: http://www.elections.ca History of Federal Ridings since 1867

Notes:

"% change" refers to change from previous election

x - less than 0.005% of the popular vote

^{1} "Previous" refers to the results of the previous election, not the party standings in the House of Commons prior to dissolution.

== Vote and seat summaries ==
Ternary plots - shift of electoral support (1963-1965)
1963

1965
Electoral districts identified by colours of winning parties

Popular vote
| Liberal | 40.18% |
| PC | 32.41% |
| NDP | 17.91% |
| RC | 4.66% |
| Social Credit | 3.66% |
| Others | 1.18% |

Seat totals
| Liberal | 49.43% |
| PC | 36.60% |
| NDP | 7.92% |
| RC | 3.39% |
| Social Credit | 1.88% |
| Independent | 0.75% |

== Results by province ==
| Party name | | BC | AB | SK | MB | ON | QC | NB | NS | PE | NL | YK | NW | Total |
|---|---|---|---|---|---|---|---|---|---|---|---|---|---|---|
| Liberal | Seats: | 7 | - | - | 1 | 51 | 56 | 6 | 2 | - | 7 | - | 1 | 131 |
| Liberal | Popular Vote: | 30.0 | 22.4 | 24.0 | 31.0 | 43.6 | 45.6 | 47.5 | 42.0 | 44.1 | 64.1 | 44.8 | 56.2 | 40.2 |
| Progressive Conservative | Seats: | 3 | 15 | 17 | 10 | 25 | 8 | 4 | 10 | 4 | - | 1 | - | 97 |
| Progressive Conservative | Vote: | 19.2 | 46.6 | 48.0 | 40.7 | 34.0 | 21.3 | 42.5 | 48.6 | 53.9 | 32.4 | 55.2 | 39.1 | 32.4 |
| New Democrats | Seats: | 9 | - | - | 3 | 9 | - | - | - | - | - | | - | 21 |
| New Democrats | Vote: | 32.9 | 8.2 | 26.0 | 24.0 | 21.7 | 12.0 | 9.4 | 9.1 | 2.0 | 1.2 | | 4.7 | 17.9 |
| Ralliement créditiste | Seats: | | | | | - | 9 | - | | | | | | 9 |
| Ralliement créditiste | Vote: | | | | | xx | 17.5 | 0.4 | | | | | | 4.7 |
| Social Credit | Seats: | 3 | 2 | - | - | - | | - | | | - | | | 5 |
| Social Credit | Vote: | 17.4 | 22.5 | 1.9 | 4.3 | 0.4 | | 0.1 | | | 1.6 | | | 3.7 |
| Independent | Seats: | | | | | | 1 | | | | | | | 1 |
| Independent | Vote: | 0.2 | 0.1 | | 0.1 | 0.2 | 2.1 | | 0.3 | | | | | 0.7 |
| Independent PC | Seats: | | | | | - | 1 | | | | | | | 1 |
| Independent PC | Vote: | | | | | xx | 0.6 | | | | | | | 0.2 |
| Total seats: | | 22 | 17 | 17 | 14 | 85 | 75 | 10 | 12 | 4 | 7 | 1 | 1 | 265 |
Parties that won no seats:
| Independent Liberal | Vote: | | | | | | 0.8 | | | | 0.7 | | | 0.2 |
| Communist | Vote: | 0.2 | 0.1 | xx | | xx | xx | | | | | | | 0.1 |
| New Capitalist | Vote: | | | | | xx | | | | | | | | xx |
| Ouvrier Indépendant | Vote: | | | | | | xx | | | | | | | xx |
| Droit vital personnel | Vote: | | | | | | xx | | | | | | | xx |
| Independent Social Credit | Vote: | xx | | | | | xx | | | | | | | xx |
| Independent Conservative | Vote: | | | | | xx | | | | | | | | xx |
| Rhinoceros | Vote: | | | | | | xx | | | | | | | xx |
| Republican | Vote: | | | | | | xx | | | | | | | xx |
| Progressive Workers | Vote: | xx | | | | | | | | | | | | xx |
| Socialist Labour | Vote: | | | | | xx | | | | | | | | xx |

- xx - less than 0.05% of the popular vote

== See also ==
- List of Canadian federal general elections
- List of political parties in Canada
- 27th Canadian Parliament
