= Rhinoceros Party =

Federal political party in Canada

Parti Rhinocéros Party
- Leader: Chinook Blais-Leduc
- President: Jamie Thompson
- Chairperson: Cody Chenier
- Founder: François Gourd
- Founded: May 21, 2006
- Headquarters: 101-2230 Lespérance Street, Montréal QC H2K 2N9
- Membership (2022): 260
- Ideology: Political satire
- Senate: 0 / 105
- House of Commons: 0 / 343

Website
- www.partyrhino.ca/en/

The Rhinoceros Party (French: Parti Rhinocéros), officially the Parti Rhinocéros Party, is a Canadian federal political party. It originally existed from 1963 to 1993. It was refounded in Montreal on May 21, 2006, and was registered with Elections Canada on August 23, 2007. It was known as neorhino.ca from 2007 to 2010, when the party changed its name and logo.

The 2006 incarnation was founded by François "Yo" Gourd, who was involved with the original incarnation of the Rhinoceros Party. He has said that he named the new party (then under the name "neorhino") after the Rhinoceros Party and Neo, the Matrix character. From 2014 until 2024, the party was led by Sébastien Côrriveau (who used the names "Sébastien CôRhino Côrriveau" and "Sébastien CoRhino" when running in the 2015 and 2019 federal elections, respectively). It promises, like its predecessor, not to keep any of its promises if elected.

== Rhinoceros Party of Canada (1963–1993) ==
Rhinoceros Party of Canada Parti Rhinocéros
- Former federal party
- Leader: Cornelius the First
- Founder: Jacques Ferron
- Founded: 1963
- Dissolved: 1993
- Ideology: Satire; Frivolous; Animals as electoral candidates

The Rhinoceros Party (French: Parti Rhinocéros) was a registered political party in Canada from the 1960s to the 1990s. Operating within the tradition of political satire, the Rhinoceros Party's basic credo, their so-called primal promise, was "a promise to keep none of our promises". They then promised outlandishly impossible schemes designed to amuse and entertain the voting public.

The Rhinos were started in 1963 by Jacques Ferron, "Éminence de la Grande Corne du parti Rhinocéros". In the 1970s, a group of artists joined the party and created a comedic political platform to contest the federal election. Ferron (1979), poet Gaston Miron (1972), and singer Michel Rivard (1980) ran against Prime Minister Pierre Trudeau in his Montreal seat.

The Rhinos claimed to be the spiritual descendants of Cacareco, a Brazilian rhinoceros who was "elected" member of São Paulo's city council in 1958. The party listed Cornelius the First, a rhinoceros from the Granby Zoo, east of Montreal, as its leader. It declared that the rhinoceros was an appropriate symbol for a political party since politicians, by nature, are "thick-skinned, slow-moving, dim-witted, can move fast as hell when in danger, and have large, hairy horns growing out of the middle of their faces".

Some members of the Rhino party would call themselves Marxist-Lennonist, a parody of the factional split between the Communist Party of Canada and the Communist Party of Canada (Marxist-Leninist); however, the Rhinoceros Party meant the term in reference to Groucho Marx and John Lennon.

The party used as its logo a woodcut of a rhinoceros by Albrecht Dürer, with the words D'une mare à l'autre (a French translation of Canada's Latin motto a mari usque ad mare (from sea to sea), playing on the word mare, which means pond in French) at the top.

=== Policies and politics ===
In addition to the national platform promises released by the party leadership, individual candidates also had considerable freedom to campaign on their own ideas and slogans. Bryan Gold of the Rhinoceros Party described the party platform as two feet high and made of wood: "My platform is the one I'm standing on". A candidate named Ted "Not Too" Sharp ran in Flora MacDonald's Kingston and the Islands riding. He also took a stand on abortion (promising, if elected, never to have an abortion) and capital punishment: "If it was good enough for my grandfather, then it's good enough for me". To strengthen Canada's military, Sharp planned to tow Antarctica north to the Arctic Circle: "Once we have Antarctica, we'll control all of the world's cold. If another Cold War starts, we'll be unbeatable".

In the 1988 election, the Rhinoceros Party ran a candidate named John Turner in the same riding as Liberal leader John Turner; the party received 760 votes. Penny Hoar, a safe sex activist, distributed condoms in Toronto while running under the slogan: "Politicians screw you—protect yourself".

==== 1979 campaign ====
- Government:
  - The Queen of Canada would be seated in Buckingham, Quebec.
  - Rather than awarding money as prizes in the lottery, the winners would be appointed to the Senate of Canada.
  - Rather than patriate the constitution by bringing it to Canada, as proposed by Pierre Trudeau, the Rhinoceros Party pledged to bring Great Britain home and make it Canada's eleventh province.
- Energy:
  - Building one nuclear power plant per household, including monthly distributions of lead underwear to Canadians. Indoor lighting would then be provided by radioactive citizens.
  - Burning all the standing barns in Canada to provide energy, under the slogan Burn a barn for Britain.
- Sexual Equality:
  - Alimony payments would go directly to the federal government, and responsibility for withholding those payments would fall upon the federal government.
  - Men would be allowed to work as prostitutes, wet nurses, secretaries and receptionists.

==== 1984 campaign ====
- Economy
  - The Rhinoceros Party pledged to eliminate small businesses, and replace them with very small businesses, having less than one employee.
  - Candidate Graham Ashley, standing in Ottawa-Vanier, pledged to take Canada off the gold standard, and implement a Snow Standard, which would improve the economy until the summer.
- Public works
  - Candidate Stardust the Magician promised to put a roof on the Olympic Stadium, using only a $25-million handkerchief.

==== Other campaigns ====
Other platform promises of the Rhinoceros Party included:

- Repealing the law of gravity
- Providing higher education by building taller schools
- Instituting English, French and illiteracy as Canada's three official languages
- Tearing down the Rocky Mountains so that Albertans could see the Pacific sunset
- Eliminating unemployment by abolishing Statistics Canada, thereby eliminating the bureaucrats that measure unemployment.
- Making Montreal the Venice of North America by damming the St. Lawrence River
- Abolishing the environment because it's too hard to keep clean and it takes up so much space
- Annexing the United States, which would take its place as the third territory in Canada's backyard (after the Yukon and the Northwest Territories—Nunavut did not yet exist), in order to eliminate foreign control of Canada's natural resources
- Ending crime by abolishing all laws
- To provide more parking in the Maritimes by paving the Bay of Fundy, and to create the world's largest parking by paving the province of Manitoba
- Turning Montreal's Saint Catherine Street into the world's longest bowling alley
- Amending Canada's Freedom of Information Act: "Nothing is free anymore; Canadians should have to pay for their information".
- Making the Canadian climate more temperate by tapping into the natural resource of hot air in Ottawa.
- Storing nuclear waste in the Senate: "After all, we've been storing political waste there for years".
- Adopting the British system of driving on the left; this was to be gradually phased in over five years with large trucks and tractors first, then buses, eventually including small cars, and bicycles and wheelchairs last.
- Selling the Senate of Canada at an antique auction in California
- Putting the national debt on Visa
- Declaring war on Belgium because a Belgian cartoon character, Tintin, killed a rhinoceros in one of the cartoons
- Offering to call off the proposed Belgium-Canada war if Belgium delivered a case of mussels and a case of Belgian beer to Rhinoceros "Hindquarters" in Montreal (the Belgian Embassy in Ottawa did, in fact, do this)
- Painting Canada's coastal sea limits in watercolour so that Canadian fish would know where they were at all times
- Banning guns and butter, since both kill
- Banning lousy Canadian winters
- Building a bridge spanning the country, from Vancouver Island to Newfoundland.
- Making the Trans-Canada Highway one way only.
- Changing Canada's currency to bubble gum, so it could be inflated or deflated at will.
- Donating a free rhinoceros to every aspiring artist in Canada
- Counting the Thousand Islands to see if the Americans have stolen any
- Knocking down the Rocky Mountains and building giant bicycle paths sloping downhill in both directions, so Canadians could coast from coast to coast.

The Rhino Party also declared that, should they somehow actually win an election, they would immediately dissolve and force a second election: "We Rhinos think that elections are so much fun, we want to hold them all the time". They also declared victory after one election, claiming all candidates were Rhinoceroses, whether they knew or acknowledged it: thick-skinned, short-sighted, mean-tempered, etc.

=== Notable candidates ===
Michel Rivard once went on television (during free air time given to political parties) and stated: "I have but two things to say to you: Celery and Sidewalk. Thank you, good night".

A British Columbia splinter group proposed running a professional dominatrix for the position of party whip, renaming "British Columbia" to "La La Land", moving the provincial capital, and merging with the Progressive Conservative Party so as "not to split the silly vote".

Although not recognized in the United States, former baseball pitcher Bill Lee ran for President of the United States in 1988 on the Rhinoceros Party ticket.

In the 2019 Canadian federal election, the Rhinoceros Party ran a candidate named Maxime Bernier in the riding of Beauce against the incumbent, Maxime Bernier, leader of the People's Party of Canada. Neither candidate won, with both being defeated by Conservative Party candidate Richard Lehoux. Rhino candidate Bernier managed 1,084 votes. Even if all of these had gone to incumbent Bernier, who managed 16,796 votes, it still would not have been enough to change the result. Lehoux received 22,860 votes.

=== Electoral record ===
The Rhinoceros Party never succeeded in winning a seat in the House of Commons. In the 1984 federal election, however, the party won the fourth-largest number of votes, after the three main political parties, but ahead of several well-established minor parties. Rhino candidates sometimes came in second in certain ridings, humiliating traditional Canadian parties in the process. In the 1980 federal election, for instance, the Rhinoceros party nominated a professional clown/comedian named Sonia "Chatouille" Côté ("chatouille" means "Tickles" in French) in the Laurier riding in Montréal. Côté came in second place, after the successful Liberal candidate, but ahead of both other major parties: the third place New Democrat, and the fourth-place Progressive Conservative candidate. Chatouille received almost twice as many votes as the PC candidate.

Early in the party's history, when it was mainly composed of French-speaking Québécois, they chose their only unilingual anglophone party member as their official translator.

=== Electoral results ===
Election	# of candidates nominated	# of seats won	# of total votes	% of popular vote	% of vote in ridings contested
1965	2	0	618	0.00%	undetermined
1968	1	0	354	0.00%	undetermined
1972 (1)	1	0	1,565	0.02%	undetermined
1979	63	0	62,601	0.55%	2.32%
1980	120	0	110,286	1.01%	2.43%
1984	88	0	98,171	0.78%	2.39%
1988	74	0	52,173	0.40%	1.468%

Note:

(1) The Rhinoceros Party ran 12 candidates in the 1972 election, but was not recognized as a registered party by Elections Canada; therefore, its candidates were listed as independents. (Source: Toronto Star, October 31, 1972.)

=== 1993 abstention and subsequent dissolution ===
The party abstained from the 1993 federal election while they questioned the constitutionality of new rules that required the party to run candidates in at least 50 ridings at a cost of $1,000 per candidature. On September 23, 1993, Canada's Chief Electoral Officer, Jean-Pierre Kingsley, refused to accept the party's abstention and ordered the removal of the Rhinoceros Party from the Registry of Canadian Political Parties, effectively eliminating them from the Canadian political system. Kingsley also directed the party's official agent, Charlie (le Concierge) McKenzie (1943–2025), to liquidate all party assets and return any revenues to the Receiver General of Canada. On instructions from the party, McKenzie refused. After two years of threatening letters, Ottawa refused to prosecute McKenzie, who then claimed to hold the distinction of being Canada's "least-wanted fugitive".

In 2001, Brian "Godzilla" Salmi, who received his nickname because of the Godzilla suit he wore while campaigning, tried to revive the Rhinoceros Party to contest the British Columbia provincial election. While they pulled some pranks that earned some media coverage, only two of its candidates (Liar Liar in Vancouver-Mount Pleasant and Helvis in Vancouver-Burrard) appeared on the ballots, as the party claimed the $1,000 candidate registration fee was a financial hardship. Unregistered candidates included Geoff Berner, who received national wire service coverage for promising "cocaine and whores to potential investors". The party disbanded shortly thereafter.

== Successors ==
François Gourd, a prominent Rhino, later started another political movement, the entartistes, who attracted attention in the 1990s by planting cream pies in the faces of various Canadian politicians. In 2006, he led a group that set up Neorhino.ca in an attempt to recapture the Rhinoceros Party spirit, and ran as a Neorhino candidate in the 2007 Outremont by-election.

Other Rhinoceros Party members founded the Parti citron (Lemon Party), which attempted to bring a similar perspective to provincial politics in Quebec.

After the party's dissolution, a number of independent election candidates informally claimed the Rhinoceros Party label even though the party itself no longer existed. There were also a number of unsuccessful attempts to revive the Rhinos as a legally incorporated political party, though this was not fully achieved until Neorhino.ca.

== Neorhino.ca ==
On August 7, 2007, Brian Salmi, then-president of the Rhinoceros Party, announced a $50-million lawsuit contesting an election reform law that had stripped his party of its registered status in 1993.

Legally changing his name to Sa Tan, he had planned to run under the Rhino banner in the September 2007 by-election. However, a previous law from 1993 stated that registered parties must run candidates in at least 50 ridings, at a cost of $1,000 per riding, to keep their status. In protest of the new law, the party planned to abstain from the election. Canada's then-chief electoral officer, Jean-Pierre Kingsley, rejected the abstention and ordered the party removed from the registry of Canadian political parties. The lawsuit was filed as a result of the removal from the national party registry by Mr. Kingsley. Since Salmi had legally changed his name, the lawsuit was filed as Sa Tan vs. Her Majesty The Queen.

The lawsuit was dropped after the ruling of the chief electoral officer was reversed in a new law passed in 2004 that said a party only had to run one candidate in a federal election or federal by-election to be considered registered.

=== Electoral record ===
Candidates of Neorhino.ca and the Rhinoceros Party have not recorded any electoral victories. Before the Neorhino.ca candidates stood for the ridings of Outremont and Saint-Hyacinthe—Bagot in the 2007 federal by-elections, Neorhino.ca and the Rhinoceros Party before them had not fielded a candidate since Bryan Gold's failed bid to win a 1990 by-election in the New Brunswick electoral district of Beauséjour.

Neorhino.ca candidates did not win any seats in the 2007 by-elections, the 2008 federal election, or the 2011 federal election.

=== 2007/2008 by-elections ===
Candidate	Votes	%	Placement	District	Date
François Gourd	145	0.6	6/12	Outremont	September 17, 2007
Christian Willie Vanasse	384	1.2	6/7	Saint-Hyacinthe—Bagot	September 17, 2007
John Turner	111	0.4	5/6	Vancouver Quadra	March 17, 2008

=== 2008 federal election ===
Election	# of candidates	# of votes	% of popular vote	% in ridings run	# of seats
2008	7	2,263	0.02%	0.67%	0

=== 2009 by-elections ===
Candidate	Votes	%	Placement	District	Date
Gabrielle Anctil	129	0.7	6/8	Hochelaga	November 9, 2009

== Rhinoceros Party ==
The party changed from neorhino.ca to its new formal name the Rhinoceros Party in mid-2010. It also registered a new logo with Elections Canada.

=== Electoral results ===
Election	# of candidates	# of votes	% of popular vote	% in ridings run	Seats won
2011	14	3,800	0.03%	0.57%	0
2015	27	7,263	0.04%	0.52%	0
2019	43	9,408	0.04%	0.45%	0
2021	27	6,085	0.04%		0
2025	29	7,063	0.04%		0

=== 2011 candidates ===
Riding	Province	Candidate	Occupation	Notes	Votes	%	Placement
Ahuntsic	Quebec	Jean-Olivier Berthiaume			299	0.64	6/6
Berthier—Maskinongé	Quebec	Martin Jubinville			373	0.66	6/6
Chicoutimi—Le Fjord	Quebec	Marielle Couture			340	0.67	6/6
Hochelaga	Quebec	Hugo Samson Veillette			246	0.53	6/8
Honoré-Mercier	Quebec	Valery Chevrefils-Latulippe			181	0.38	6/7
LaSalle—Émard	Quebec	Guillaume Berger-Richard			208	0.50	7/7
Laurier—Sainte-Marie	Quebec	François Yo Gourd			398	0.79	6/9
Outremont	Quebec	Tommy Gaudet			160	0.41	6/7
Rosemont—La Petite-Patrie	Quebec	Jean-Patrick Berthiaume	Politician	Born in Saint-Jérôme, Berthiaume contested Rosemont—La Petite-Patrie in the 2008 federal election as a neorhino.ca candidate. He was the leader of the Rhinoceros Party's Laboratoire des Sciences de la Démocratie (LSD) in 2011.	417	0.77	6/7
Sherbrooke	Quebec	Crédible Berlingot Landry			233	0.45	6/6
Trois-Rivières	Quebec	Francis Arsenault			256	0.51	7/7
Westmount—Ville-Marie	Quebec	Victoria Haliburton			140	0.34	6/7
Peace River	Alberta	Donovan Eckstrom			345	0.72	6/6
Cariboo—Prince George	British Columbia	Jordan Turner			204	0.47	7/7

=== 2015 candidates ===
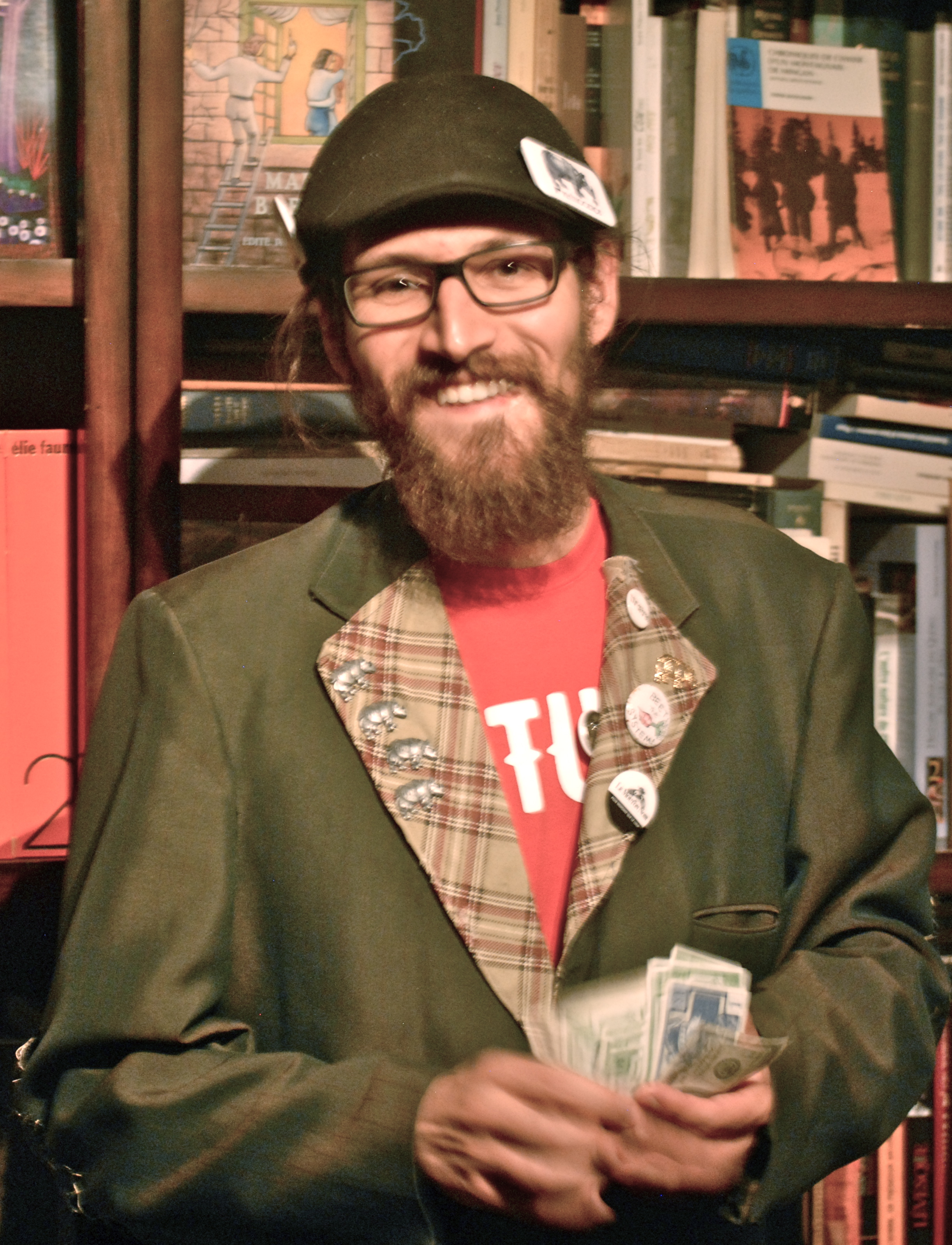
Sébastien Corriveau, leader of the Rhinoceros Party from 2014 until 2024, shown here in 2019.

On August 17, Sébastien CôRhino declared in Montréal he was willing to nationalize Tim Hortons and privatize the Royal Canadian Army at the same time: "We'll look at the results after five years, after 10 years, after 50 years and with the results of these studies we'll be able to determine if other economic sectors should also be nationalized or be privatized." Montreal candidate Ben 97 Benoit also publicly announced that he wanted to move the capital to Kapuskasing, Ontario, to "bring democracy closer to Canadians", as Kapuskasing is in the country's centre.

Riding	Province	Candidate name	Occupation	Notes	Votes	%	Placement
Abitibi—Baie-James—Nunavik—Eeyou	Quebec	Mario Gagnon			258	0.75	6/6
Abitibi—Témiscamingue	Quebec	Pascal Le Fou Gélinas			425	0.85	6/6
Ahuntsic-Cartierville	Quebec	Catherine Gascon-David			285	0.51	6/6
Avignon—La Mitis—Matane—Matapédia	Quebec	Éric Normand			175	0.48	7/7
Compton—Stanstead	Quebec	Kevin Côté			315	0.56	6/6
Edmonton Centre	Alberta	Steven Stauffer			257	0.48	5/6
Edmonton Griesbach	Alberta	Bun Bun Thompson			144	0.30	7/8
Edmonton Strathcona	Alberta	Donovan Eckstrom			133	0.24	7/10
Elgin—Middlesex—London	Ontario	Lou Bernardi			185	0.32	6/6
Gaspésie—Les Îles-de-la-Madeleine	Quebec	Max Boudreau			300	0.76	6/6
Hochelaga	Quebec	Nicolas Lemay			411	0.79	6/8
Jonquière	Quebec	Marielle Couture			382	0.79	6/6
Kings—Hants	Nova Scotia	Megan Brown-Hodges			184	0.39	5/7
La Pointe-de-l'Île	Quebec	Ben 97 Benoit			358	0.65	6/8
Lethbridge	Alberta	Solly Krygier-Paine			209	0.37	6/6
Longueuil—Charles-LeMoyne	Quebec	Matthew Iakov Liberman			325	0.63	6/7
Montmagny—L'Islet—Kamouraska—Rivière-du-Loup	Quebec	Bien Gras Gagné			287	0.58	6/6
Moose Jaw—Lake Centre—Lanigan	Saskatchewan	Robert Thomas			208	0.50	5/5
Ottawa Centre	Ontario	Conrad Lukawski			167	0.22	6/8
Papineau	Quebec	Tommy Gaudet		Challenged Liberal leader Justin Trudeau, who became Prime Minister of Canada after the election	323	0.64	7/10
Richmond—Arthabaska	Quebec	Antoine Dubois			384	0.66	6/6
Rimouski—Neigette—Témiscouata—Les Basques	Quebec	Sébastien CôRhino Côrriveau		Leader of party	273	0.61	6/6
Rivière du Nord	Quebec	Fobozof A. Côté			261	0.46	6/6
Rosemont—La Petite-Patrie	Quebec	Laurent Aglat			495	0.85	6/8
Saskatoon—University	Saskatchewan	Eric Matthew Schalm			93	0.21	5/5
Sherbrooke	Quebec	Hubert Richard			265	0.46	7/7
Ville-Marie—Le Sud-Ouest—Île-des-Sœurs	Quebec	Daniel Wolfe			161	0.32	6/7

=== 2019 candidates ===
List of candidates and election results:

Riding	Province	Candidate name	Occupation	Notes	Votes	%	Placement
Québec	Québec	Sébastien CoRhino	Leader of the Rhinoceros Party and eternal commander of good humour	Party dealer	349	0.6	7/8
Beauce	Québec	Maxime Bernier		Ran against former cabinet minister Maxime Bernier	1,072	0.8	7/7
Laurentides—Labelle	Québec	Ludovic Schneider			265	0.4	7/8
Ville-Marie—Le Sud-Ouest—Île-des-Sœurs	Québec	Tommy Douteulogue Gaudet			165	0.3	7/10
Hochelaga	Québec	Chinook Blais-Leduc		Leader of party	301	0.6	7/9
Thérèse-De Blainville	Québec	Alain Lamontagne			213	0.4	7/8
LaSalle—Émard—Verdun	Québec	Rhino Jacques Bélanger			261	0.5	8/9
Laurier—Sainte-Marie	Québec	Mélissa Archie Morals Charron			203	0.4	7/10
Outremont	Québec	Mark John Hiemstra			151	0.4	7/7
West Vancouver—Sunshine Coast—Sea to Sky Country	British Columbia	Gordon Jeffrey			206	0.3	6/7
Drummond	Québec	Réal BatRhino			205	0.5	7/8
Compton—Stanstead	Québec	Jonathan Therrien			250	0.4	7/7
Thornhill	Ontario	Nathan Bregman			217	0.4	5/6
Mégantic—L'Érable	Québec	Damien Roy			250	0.5	7/8
Edmonton Centre	Alberta	Donovan Eckstrom			201	0.4	6/8
Berthier—Maskinongé	Québec	Martin Acetaria Caesar Jubinville			161	0.3	7/9
Calgary Signal Hill	Alberta	Christina Bassett			505	0.8	6/7
Newmarket—Aurora	Ontario	Laurie Goble			101	0.2	7/7
Sherbrooke	Québec	Steve A Côté DeLaTrack			221	0.4	7/8
Papineau	Québec	Jean-Patrick “Cacereco” Berthiaume		Challenged Prime Minister Justin Trudeau	334	0.7	6/11
Montarville	Québec	Thomas Thibault-Vincent			208	0.4	7/7
Hull—Aylmer	Québec	Sébastien Grenier			191	0.4	8/8
Glengarry—Prescott—Russell	Ontario	Marc-Antoine Gagnier	Author and YouTuber		187	0.3	8/8
Gaspésie—Les Îles-de-la-Madeleine	Québec	Cowboy Jay			353	0.9	6/7
Dorval—Lachine—LaSalle	Québec	Xavier Watso			169	0.3	8/8
Chicoutimi—Le Fjord	Québec	Line “Wallace” Bélanger			290	0.7	7/7
Rosemont—La Petite-Patrie	Québec	Jos Guitare Lavoie			342	0.6	6/9
Rimouski-Neigette—Témiscouata—Les Basques	Québec	Lysane Picker-Paquin			176	0.4	7/7
Brome—Missisquoi	Québec	Steeve Cloutier			307	0.5	7/8
Regina—Qu'Appelle	Saskatchewan	Éric Normand		Challenged Conservative Official Opposition leader Andrew Scheer	75	0.2	8/8
Windsor West	Ontario	Conrad Lukawski			N/A	N/A	N/A
Terrebonne	Québec	Paul Vézina			252	0.4	7/8
Toronto Centre	Ontario	Sean Carson	Comedian and writer		143	0.3	6/9
Ottawa—Vanier	Ontario	Derek Miller			339	0.5	7/10
Kings—Hants	Nova Scotia	Nicholas Tan			147	0.3	6/7
Algoma—Manitoulin—Kapuskasing	Ontario	Le Marquis de Marmalade			124	0.3	6/6
Richmond Hill	Ontario	Otto Fungi Wevers			126	0.3	6/6
Avignon—La Mitis—Matane—Matapédia	Québec	Mathieu Castonguay	Web programmer		178	0.5	7/7
Hamilton West—Ancaster—Dundas	Ontario	Spencer Rocchi	Teacher		159	0.2	6/6
Hamilton Mountain	Ontario	Richard Plett	Businessman		109	0.2	7/7
Regina—Qu'Appelle	Saskatchewan	Daniel Gagnon		Refused	N/A	N/A	N/A
Regina—Qu'Appelle	Saskatchewan	Ryan Huard	Firmware developer	Refused	N/A	N/A	N/A

=== 2021 candidates ===
List of candidates and election results:

Riding	Province	Candidate	Occupation	Notes	Votes	%	Placement
Central Nova	Nova Scotia	Ryan Smyth			65	0.16	8/8
Montmagny—L'Islet—Kamouraska—Rivière-du-Loup	Quebec	Thibaud Mony			269	0.56	6/6
Rimouski-Neigette—Témiscouata—Les Basques	Quebec	Megan Hodges			192	0.46	8/8
Jonquière	Quebec	Line Bélanger			372	0.82	6/6
Portneuf—Jacques-Cartier	Quebec	Tommy Pelletier			490	0.75	7/7
Saint-Maurice—Champlain	Quebec	Dji-Pé Frazer			285	0.51	8/9
Richmond—Arthabaska	Quebec	Marjolaine Delisle			448	0.78	7/7
Beloeil—Chambly	Quebec	Thomas Thibault-Vincent		Challenged Bloc Québécois leader Yves-François Blanchet	185	0.28	9/10
Papineau	Quebec	Above Znoneofthe		Challenged Prime Minister Justin Trudeau	418	0.92	7/10
Hochelaga	Quebec	Alan Smithee			238	0.50	7/9
Abitibi—Témiscamingue	Quebec	Joël Lirette			275	0.60	8/8
Gatineau	Quebec	Sébastien Grenier			178	0.34	8/9
Hull—Aylmer	Quebec	Mike LeBlanc			203	0.40	8/9
Rivière-du-Nord	Quebec	Jean-François René			373	0.65	7/8
Lanark—Frontenac—Kingston	Ontario	Blake Hamilton			211	0.34	6/6
Durham	Ontario	Adam Smith		Challenged Conservative Official Opposition leader Erin O'Toole	150	0.22	6/7
Etobicoke—Lakeshore	Ontario	Sean Carson			119	0.19	7/7
Mississauga—Lakeshore	Ontario	Kayleigh Tahk			94	0.17	6/6
Burlington	Ontario	Jevin David Carroll			122	0.18	6/6
Hamilton West—Ancaster—Dundas	Ontario	Spencer Rocchi			137	0.22	6/6
Kitchener South—Hespeler	Ontario	Stephen Davis			93	0.19	7/8
Saint Boniface—Saint Vital	Manitoba	Sébastien CoRhino	Leader of the Rhinoceros Party and eternal commander of good humour	Party dealer	80	0.18	6/21
Grande Prairie-Mackenzie	Alberta	Donovan Eckstrom			314	0.59	6/6
Calgary Heritage	Alberta	Mark Dejewski			230	0.43	7/7
Calgary Nose Hill	Alberta	Vanessa Wang			285	0.57	6/9
Pitt Meadows—Maple Ridge	British Columbia	Peter Buddle			161	0.30	6/6
West Vancouver—Sunshine Coast—Sea to Sky Country	British Columbia	Gordon Jeffrey			198	0.15	6/8

=== 2025 candidates ===
Riding	Province	Candidate name	Occupation
Gaspésie—Les Îles-de-la-Madeleine—Listuguj	Quebec	Shawn Grenier	YouTuber
Victoria	British Columbia	Cody Fraser	
Avalon	Newfoundland and Labrador	Alexander Tilley	
West Vancouver-Sunshine Coast-Sea to Sky Country	British Columbia	Gordon Jeffrey	
Carleton	Ontario	Sébastien CoRhino	
Hamilton-Centre	Ontario	Cody Chenier	Comedian
Waterloo	Ontario	Santa Claus Chatham	
Richmond—Arthabaska	Quebec	Réal Batrhino Martel	
Côte-Nord—Kawawachikamach—Nitassinan	Quebec	Sébastien Beaulieu	
Pitt Meadows—Maple Ridge	British Columbia	Peter Buddle	
Ottawa South	Ontario	William Cooper	
LaSalle—Émard—Verdun	Quebec	Frédéric Dénommé	
Ville-Marie—Le Sud-Ouest—Île-des-Sœurs	Quebec	Giovanni Di Placido	
Trois-Rivières	Quebec	Mathieu Doyon	
Grande Prairie	Alberta	Donovan Eckstrom	
Calgary Centre	Alberta	Scott Fea	
Saint-Maurice—Champlain	Quebec	Dji-Pé Frazer	
Longueuil—Charles-LeMoyne	Quebec	Donald Gagnon	
Burlington	Ontario	Paul Harper	
Notre-Dame-de-Grâce—Westmount	Quebec	Stephen Hensley	
Dorval—Lachine—LaSalle	Quebec	André Lavigne	
Sarnia—Lambton—Bkejwanong	Ontario	Tony Mitchell	
Côte-du-Sud—Rivière-du-Loup—Kataskomiq—Témiscouata	Quebec	Thibaud Mony	
Abitibi—Témiscamingue	Quebec	Vincent Palin-Bussières	
Rimouski—La Matapédia	Quebec	Lysane Picker-Paquin	
Laurier—Sainte-Marie	Quebec	Chantal Poulin	
Bowmanville—Oshawa North	Ontario	Adam Smith	
Calgary Nose Hill	Alberta	Vanessa Wang	
Papineau	Quebec	Xavier Watso	

== Leaders ==
Leader	Term start	Term end	Notes
Cornelius the First	1963	1993	
François Gourd	January 1, 2007	April 30, 2014	
Cornoline Lagrande	May 1, 2014	October 2014	Acting
Sébastien Côrriveau (Sébastien CoRhino)	November 2014	December 13, 2024	
Chinook Blais-Leduc	2025	present	

== Platform ==
2019 campaign:

- National Defence
  - The Rhinoceros Party says that National Defense is their number one priority.
- The Economy
  - The Rhinoceros Party says that the Economy is their number one priority.
  - The party plans to open tax havens in all provinces to keep foreign funds "local".
  - By 2022, the party pledges to complete the privatization of the Senate initiated by previous governments.
  - Fill the coffers of the state by allowing advertising in the Senate and the House of Commons.
  - To stimulate the economy, were it to be elected, the party would change 25 cents into thirty-cents. In this way, taxpayers would see their income increase by 16%!
- Education
  - The Rhinoceros Party says that education is their number one priority
  - Replace teachers on leave with photos of famous scientists.
- Employment
  - The Rhinoceros Party says that employment is their number one priority
  - By 2020 all citizens will have a job and some will even have two.
  - Rewrite the Labour Code in order to add one holiday per month. April 1 and the birthday of the party leader will also become holidays. Finally, it will be forbidden to work the day after a holiday.
  - Reduce the number of accidents in factories by wrapping all workers in bubble wrap.
- Green Plan
  - The Rhinoceros Party says that the Environment is their number one priority
  - Green cars are not available in sufficient numbers in Canada. Car manufacturers would be forced to build more green cars: forest green, pale green, khaki green and neon green.
  - Scientists predict that in the next 20 years, global warming will threaten the existence of human beings. The party says they can make it happen in 10 years!
  - In order to fight global warming, all citizens will be forced to leave their windows open in the summer and to operate the air conditioning to the maximum.
  - Bribe the Weather Network hosts to announce more sunshine on the weekend and less snow in the winter.
  - Use global warming to Canada's advantage, making the country warmer, shortening winters, and creating an agriculture industry in the territories.
- Justice
  - The Rhinoceros Party says that justice is their number one priority
  - In the interests of equity among all Canadian provinces, the War Measures Act will be applied to the 9 provinces that did not have the privilege in October 1970.
- Canadian Heritage
  - The Rhinoceros Party says that Canadian Heritage is their number one priority
  - Make "Sorry" the new official motto of Canada.
  - Nationalize bacon.
  - To create a more egalitarian Canada, all maps will be redrawn so that all provinces are rectangular like Saskatchewan.
  - Make illiteracy the third official language of Canada.
- International relationships
  - The Rhinoceros Party says that International relationships are their number one priority
  - Following the Trudeau government's inaction, the magnetic pole moved from Canada to Russia. The Rhinoceros Party has promised to bring it back.
  - Finished, ambassador appointments in a partisan and arbitrary way! The ambassador positions will now be sold to the highest bidders.
  - Annexation of Massachusetts to have champion sports teams again.
- Health
  - The Rhinoceros Party says that health is their number one priority
  - Reduce traffic in emergency rooms across Canada by eliminating waiting rooms.
  - To counter the shortage of doctors and nurses, all employees will be provided with steroids to increase their performance.
- Public security
  - The Rhinoceros Party says that public security is their number one priority
  - To help victims of identity theft, a new name and birth date will be provided to citizens who request it.
  - To increase the safety of Canadian children, the name of newborns must be at least 12 letters, including a capital letter, a number and a special character.

If elected, the Rhinoceros Party of Canada has promised to:

- Take Canada off the gold standard, opting instead to use a snow standard to boost the economy at least until summer.
- Repeal the law of gravity
- Promote higher education by building taller schools
- Pave the Bay of Fundy to make more parking for the Maritimes
- Count the Thousand Islands to make sure the Americans didn’t steal any
- Change Montreal’s rue Ste-Catherine into the world’s longest bowling alley
- Ban crappy Canadian winters
- Abolish all laws to end crime
- Tear down the Rockies so Albertans can see the Pacific sunset
- Abolish lawn mowing in Outremont, QC
- Ban guns and butter—both kill
- Reform the retail lottery scheme by replacing cash prizes with Senate appointments
- Forget having two official languages; replace with having two official ears (In French, the same word is used for "language" and for "tongue")
- Seat the Queen of Canada in Buckingham, Quebec
- Privatize the Queen
- Tax the black market
- Nationalize Tim Hortons
- Move the national capital to Kapuskasing, Ontario to be closer to the centre of the country
- In order to increase car pooling and reduce road speeds, car manufacturers will need to move the brake pedal to the passenger side.
- Rename black ice to neon yellow ice.
- During a storm all speed limits will be eliminated to make sure Canadians spend as little time on the roads as possible in order to reduce the likelihood of a collision.
- Use rubber instead of concrete when building roads in major cities to reduce the number of injuries to cyclists.
- Encouraged by the success of law that now allows motorists to turn right on a red light, the party will now allow them to turn left or go straight.
- Mandate archaeologists to discover if remains of roads actually exist under Montreal potholes.
- Promote MP fitness by having them cross the floor daily.
- Transport oil and gas in blimps instead of pipelines.

== Archives ==
There are Rhinoceros Party fonds at Library and Archives Canada.

== See also ==
- Novelty candidate
- Category:Rhinoceros Party politicians
- List of frivolous political parties
- Independent Rhinoceros candidates in the 1997 Canadian federal election
- Non-human electoral candidates
