= Cacareco =

Rhinoceros (1954–1962)

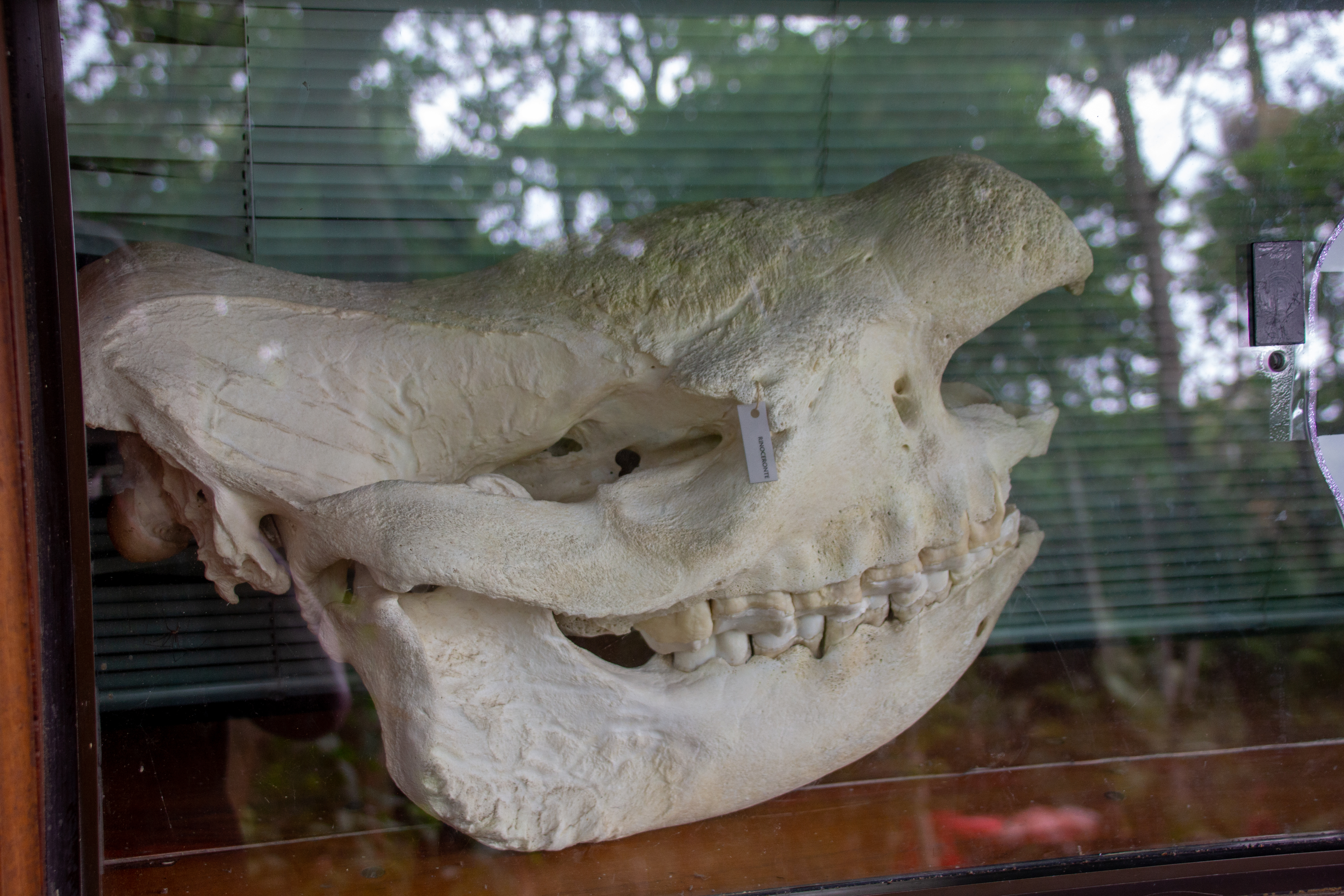
The skull of Cacareco at São Paulo Zoo

Cacareco (1954–1962) was a female black rhinoceros exhibited in Brazilian zoos. She is known for receiving many votes in the 1959 São Paulo city council elections as a form of protest vote. Electoral officials did not accept Cacareco's candidacy, but she eventually won 100,000 votes, more than any other party in that same election (which was also marked by rampant absenteeism).

Cacareco's candidacy inspired the Rhinoceros Party of Canada, nominally led by the rhinoceros Cornelius the First.

== History ==
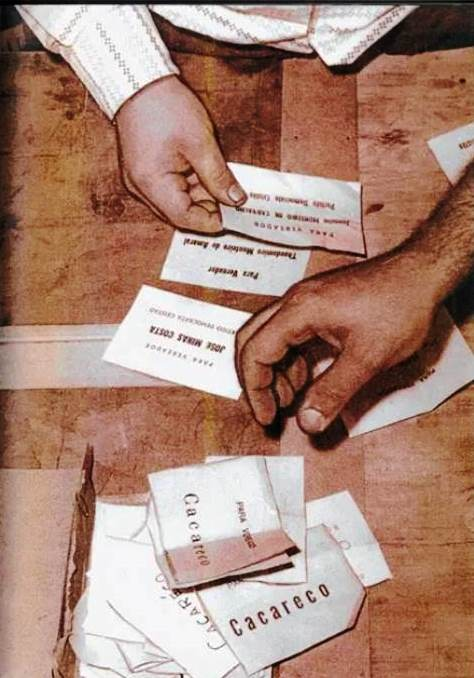
Printed ballots with Cacareco's name for the São Paulo city council elections of October 4, 1959

Cacareco was born in 1954 at the Jardim Zoológico do Rio de Janeiro. She was the daughter of rhinoceroses Britador and Terezinha. In 1958 she was loaned for three months, on the occasion of the opening of São Paulo Zoo. The following year, there were elections being held for the city council. Journalist Itaboraí Martins, displeased with the candidates' level, proposed the name of Cacareco as a write-in candidate.

Cacareco was returned to Rio de Janeiro two days before the elections, where she received 100,000 votes. She was also exhibited at Porto Alegre in 1962, before dying in the same year. Her skeleton is currently on display at the Museum of Anatomy of the University of São Paulo.
