= National Congress of Italian Canadians =

The National Congress of Italian Canadians is an umbrella organization that represents Italian Canadian organizations in Canada. It was founded in 1974 as a successor to the Federation of Italian Canadian Associations. The congress has a federated structure with seven district organizations.

== Activities ==
=== Redress for internees ===
Since 1990, the congress has sought compensation for Italian Canadians who were interned and arrested by the Canadian government during World War II. At one stage in the mid-1990s, the congress voted to drop its request for compensation and focus on clearing the Royal Canadian Mounted Police records of surviving internees; in later years, however, it resumed its efforts for compensation.

In 1990, former prime minister Brian Mulroney apologized for the war internment of Italian Canadians to a Toronto meeting of the National Congress of Italian Canadians: "On behalf of the government and the people of Canada, I offer a full and unqualified apology for the wrongs done to our fellow Canadians of Italian origin during World War II."

In May 2009, Massimo Pacetti introduced bill C-302, an "Act to recognize the injustice that was done to persons of Italian origin through their "enemy alien" designation and internment during the Second World War, and to provide for restitution and promote education on Italian Canadian history [worth $2.5 million]", which was passed by the House of Commons on April 28, 2010. Canada Post was also to issue a commemorative postage stamp commemorating the internment of Italian Canadian citizens, however, Bill C-302 did not pass through the necessary stages to become law.

=== Political activism ===
The congress has traditionally supported Canadian federalism. In November 1996, it joined with the Canadian Jewish Congress and the Hellenic Canadian Congress in issuing a pamphlet calling for renewed Canadian unity. It has also promoted the right of Italian citizens living in Canada to participate in Italian elections.

Several congress members have been active in Canadian political life, including Laureano Leone, Rosario Marchese, and Annamarie Castrilli.

== See also ==
=== Archives ===
There is a National Congress of Italian Canadians fonds at Library and Archives Canada. The archival reference number is R4504.
