= Cornelius the First =

Rhinoceros

Cornelius the First (died April 3, 2013) was a black rhinoceros at the Granby Zoo in Granby, Quebec, Canada.

== Political candidature ==
Cornelius was the nominal leader of the federal political party the Rhinoceros Party of Canada from 1965 to 1993. The party attracted a considerable number of votes in Canadian elections 1979, 1980 and 1984. While the Rhinoceros Party occasionally came in second place in some ridings, it has never elected a candidate to the House of Commons of Canada.

The Party was inspired by Cacareco, a rhinoceros at the São Paulo zoo in Brazil, which was a candidate for the 1958 city council elections with the intention of protesting against political corruption. Electoral officials did not accept Cacareco's candidacy; however, the rhinoceros eventually won 100,000 votes, more than any other party in that election (which was also marked by rampant absenteeism). Today, the term "Voto Cacareco" (Cacareco vote) is commonly used to describe protest votes in Brazil.

During the Canadian federal election of 1984, the party made a major part of their platform declaring war on Belgium because a Belgian cartoon character, Tintin, killed a rhinoceros in one of the early works of the comics series. The party offered to call off the threatened Belgium-Canada war if Belgium delivered a case of mussels and a case of Belgian beer to Rhinoceros "Hindquarters" in Montreal (the Belgian Embassy in Ottawa went through with it).

== United States ==
The Granby Zoo eventually traded Cornelius to the San Diego Zoo in exchange for a giraffe. The San Diego Zoo loaned him to the Caldwell Zoo, where he fathered an offspring on January 6, 2003.

== Death ==
Cornelius died on April 3, 2013, at the Caldwell Zoo. A news report indicated he "was suffering from pneumonia and mycobacterium tuberculosis complex was present in his lungs".

Party political offices
New political party	Nominal leader of the Rhinoceros Party; 1963–1993	Party deregistered
