= Pierre-Julien Leclair =

Canadian politician (1860–1897)

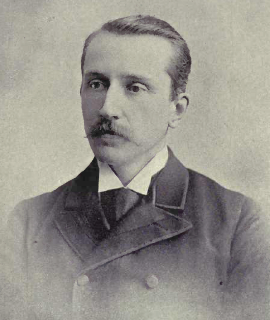

Member of the Canadian Parliament for Terrebonne
- In office 1893–1896
- Preceded by: Joseph-Adolphe Chapleau
- Succeeded by: Léon Adolphe Chauvin

Personal details
- Born: September 16, 1860 Sainte-Thérèse, Canada East
- Died: May 10, 1897 (aged 36)
- Party: Conservative

Pierre-Julien Leclair (French pronunciation: [pjɛʁ ʒyljɛ̃ ləklɛʁ]; September 16, 1860 – May 10, 1897) was a Canadian politician.

Born in Sainte-Thérèse, Canada East, he was educated at the College of Ste. Therese and studied law in Université Laval, graduating with the degree of LL.B. After studying law in the office of De Lorimier & De Lorirnier, he was admitted to the practice of law in July 1883. He later became a partner in the firm Auge, Leclair & Chaffers. He was acclaimed as the Conservative candidate to the House of Commons of Canada in an 1893 by-election for the riding of Terrebonne. He did not run in the 1896 election.
