= Jules-Édouard Prévost =

Canadian politician

The Hon. Jules-Édouard Prévost

Member of the Canadian Parliament for Terrebonne
- In office December 1917 – June 1930
- Preceded by: Gédéon Rochon
- Succeeded by: Louis-Étienne Parent

Senator for Mille Isles, Quebec
- In office June 1930 – October 1943
- Appointed by: William Lyon Mackenzie King
- Preceded by: Napoléon Kemner Laflamme
- Succeeded by: Armand Daigle

Personal details
- Born: 21 November 1871 Saint-Jérôme, Quebec, Canada
- Died: 13 October 1943 (aged 71)
- Party: Laurier Liberals; Liberal
- Spouse(s): Hermine Smith m. 16 July 1912
- Profession: journalist, publisher

Jules-Édouard Prévost (21 November 1871 – 13 October 1943) was a Laurier Liberal and Liberal party member of the House of Commons of Canada. He was born in Saint-Jérôme, Quebec and became a journalist and publisher.

Prévost attended Collège Saint-Suplice in Montreal then studied further in Paris and Rome. He was a director of the newspaper l'Avenir du Nord. In 1910, he became a member of Quebec's Council of Public Instruction and from 1914 to 1916 was president of the French Aid Society for Terrebonne County.

He was first elected to Parliament at the Terrebonne riding under the Laurier Liberals in the 1917 general election. After this, he was re-elected as a Liberal in 1921, 1925 and 1926.

During his term in the 16th Canadian Parliament, Prévost was appointed to the Senate on 3 June 1930 and remained in that role until his death on 13 October 1943.

His uncle was politician Wilfrid Prévost, father of politician Jean Prévost.

== Electoral record ==
1926 Canadian federal election: Terrebonne
Party	Candidate	Votes	%	±%
Liberal	Jules-Édouard Prévost	7,060	75.7	+3.4
Conservative	Léopold Nantel	2,270	24.3	-3.4
Total valid votes		9,330	100.0	

1925 Canadian federal election: Terrebonne
Party	Candidate	Votes	%	±%
Liberal	Jules-Édouard Prévost	6,789	72.2	+1.3
Conservative	Léopold Nantel	2,609	27.8	-1.3
Total valid votes		9,398	100.0	

1921 Canadian federal election: Terrebonne
Party	Candidate	Votes	%
Liberal	Jules-Édouard Prévost	8,882	71.0
Conservative	Guillaume-André Fauteux	3,636	29.0
Total valid votes		12,518	100.0

1917 Canadian federal election: Terrebonne
Party	Candidate	Votes
Opposition (Laurier Liberals)	Jules-Édouard Prévost	acclaimed
