= Blainville—Deux-Montagnes =

Former federal electoral district in Quebec, Canada

Quebec electoral district

Defunct federal electoral district
- Legislature: House of Commons
- District created: 1976
- District abolished: 1996
- First contested: 1979
- Last contested: 1993

Blainville—Deux-Montagnes (French pronunciation: [blɛ̃vil dø mɔ̃taɲ]; formerly known as Deux-Montagnes) was a federal electoral district in Quebec, Canada, that was represented in the House of Commons of Canada from 1979 to 1997.

The riding was created as "Deux-Montagnes" in 1976 from parts of Argenteuil—Deux-Montagnes and Terrebonne ridings. It was renamed "Blainville—Deux-Montagnes" in 1977. The electoral district was abolished in 1996, and divided between Saint-Eustache—Sainte-Thérèse and Terrebonne—Blainville ridings.

Blainville—Deux-Montagnes initially consisted of the cities of Deux-Montagnes and Sainte-Thérèse; the towns of Blainville, Boisbriand, Lorraine, Rosemère, Saint Eustache and Sainte-Marthe-sur-le-Lac; and the village municipality of Pointe-Calumet and the parish municipality of Saint-Joseph-du-Lac in the county of Deux-Montagnes. In 1987, it was redefined to consist of the towns of Blainville, Boisbriand, Deux-Montagnes, Lorraine, Rosemère, Saint-Eustache, Sainte-Marthe-sur-le-Lac and Sainte-Thérèse.

== Members of Parliament ==
This riding has elected the following members of Parliament:

| Parliament | Years | Member | Party |
|---|---|---|---|
Blainville—Deux-Montagnes; Riding created from Argenteuil—Deux-Montagnes and Terrebonne
| 31st | 1979–1980 | Francis Fox | Liberal |
| 32nd | 1980–1984 | Francis Fox | Liberal |
| 33rd | 1984–1988 | Monique Landry | Progressive Conservative |
| 34th | 1988–1993 | Monique Landry | Progressive Conservative |
| 35th | 1993–1997 | Paul Mercier | Bloc Québécois |
Riding dissolved into Saint-Eustache—Sainte-Thérèse and Terrebonne—Blainville

== Election results ==
1979 Canadian federal election
| Party | Candidate | Votes | % | ±% |
|---|---|---|---|---|
| Liberal | Francis Fox | 34,885 | | |
| Social Credit | Carmen Paquin-Houle | 5,972 | | |
| Progressive Conservative | François de Sales Robert | 5,042 | | |
| New Democratic | Normand Labrie | 3,472 | | |
| Rhinoceros | Claude Dicaire | 1,325 | | |
| Libertarian | Richard Kendall | 211 | | |
| Union populaire | Guy Rainville | 170 | | |
| Marxist–Leninist | Christiane Tardif | 146 | | |

1980 Canadian federal election
| Party | Candidate | Votes | % | ±% |
|---|---|---|---|---|
| Liberal | Francis Fox | 35,979 | | |
| New Democratic | Normand Labrie | 5,460 | | |
| Progressive Conservative | François de Sales Robert | 3,448 | | |
| Social Credit | Carmen Paquin-Houle | 1,699 | | |
| Rhinoceros | Philippe Sarto Grenier | 1,685 | | |
| Union populaire | Pierre Desrosiers | 213 | | |
| Libertarian | Richard Kendall | 73 | | |
| Marxist–Leninist | Carolyn Zapf | 58 | | |

1984 Canadian federal election
| Party | Candidate | Votes | % | ±% |
|---|---|---|---|---|
| Progressive Conservative | Monique Landry | 28,863 | | |
| Liberal | Francis Fox | 23,732 | | |
| New Democratic | Normand J. Labrie | 5,609 | | |
| Rhinoceros | Réjean O. Lafrenière | 1,558 | | |
| Parti nationaliste | Daniel Epinat | 1,032 | | |
| Social Credit | Sylvie Houle | 255 | | |
| No affiliation | Charles C. Chiasson | 113 | | |
| Commonwealth of Canada | Sylvain G. Pelchat | 58 | | |
| Independent | Katy S. Le Rougetel | 26 | | |

1988 Canadian federal election
| Party | Candidate | Votes | % | ±% |
|---|---|---|---|---|
| Progressive Conservative | Monique Landry | 40,810 | | |
| Liberal | Zsolt Pogany | 13,787 | | |
| New Democratic | Louisette Tremblay-Hinton | 9,243 | | |
| Rhinoceros | Gilles Libellule Lehoux | 1,782 | | |
| Commonwealth of Canada | Gilles Gervais | 150 | | |

1993 Canadian federal election
| Party | Candidate | Votes | % | ±% |
|---|---|---|---|---|
| Bloc Québécois | Paul Mercier | 47,931 | | |
| Liberal | Pierre Brien | 18,830 | | |
| Progressive Conservative | Monique Landry | 11,823 | | |
| Natural Law | Linda Légaré-St-Cyr | 1,009 | | |
| New Democratic | Jean-Paul Rioux | 853 | | |
| Libertarian | Richard Kirkman Kendall | 498 | | |
| Commonwealth of Canada | Gisèle Ray | 115 | | |

== See also ==
- List of Canadian electoral districts
- Historical federal electoral districts of Canada
