= Lionel Bertrand =

Canadian politician (1906–1979)

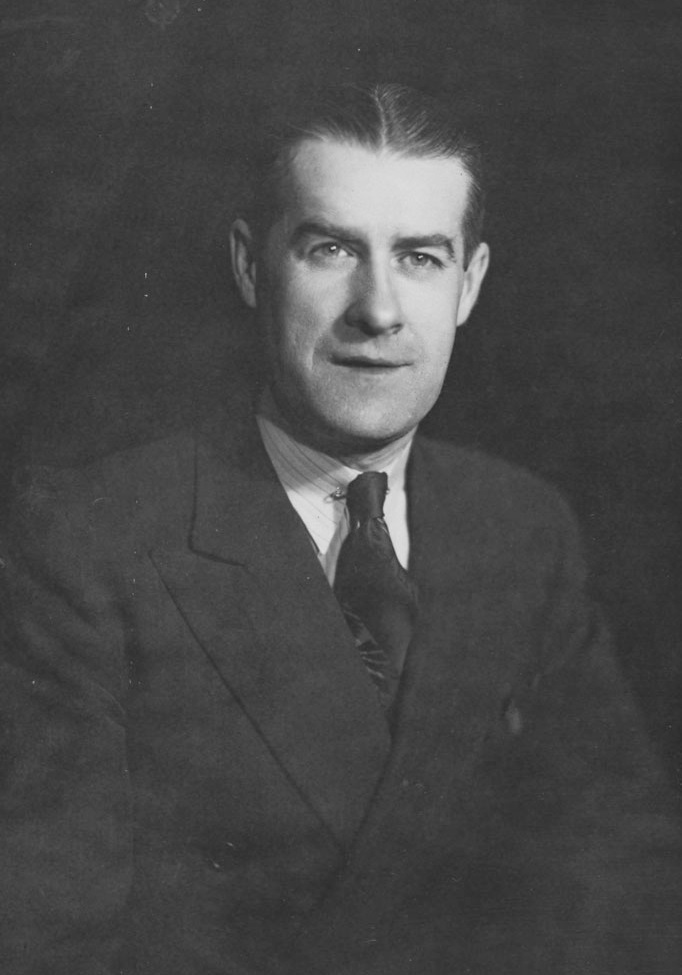

Member of the Canadian Parliament for Terrebonne
- In office 1940–1957
- Preceded by: Louis-Étienne Parent
- Succeeded by: Raymond Raymond

Personal details
- Born: March 10, 1906 St. Jovite, Quebec
- Died: March 26, 1979 (aged 73)
- Party: Independent Liberal (1940-1944), Liberal Party (1945-)

Lionel Bertrand (March 10, 1906 – March 26, 1979) was a Canadian politician, journalist and newspaper editor. Born in St. Jovite, Quebec, Bertrand was elected to the House of Commons of Canada in the 1940 election as an Independent Liberal to represent the riding of Terrebonne. He joined the Liberal Party for the 1945 election and was re-elected that year then re-elected in 1949 and in 1953. He was also a Member of the Legislative Assembly of Quebec elected in 1960 to represent the electoral district of Terrebonne. He was appointed as Provincial Secretary, followed by Minister of Tourism, Fish and Game then followed by Member of the Legislative Council of Quebec. Bertrand also authored a number of books.

== Electoral record ==
1953 Canadian federal election: Terrebonne
Party	Candidate	Votes
Liberal	Lionel Bertrand	acclaimed

1949 Canadian federal election: Terrebonne
Party	Candidate	Votes	%	±%
Liberal	Lionel Bertrand	18,304	66.9	+0.2
Progressive Conservative	Lucien Thinel	8,107	29.6	
Union des électeurs	Jean-Paul Houle	953	3.5	
Total valid votes		27,364	100.0	

1945 Canadian federal election: Terrebonne
Party	Candidate	Votes	%	±%
Liberal	Lionel Bertrand	15,383	66.6	+26.9
Bloc populaire	Henri Dionne	6,726	29.1	
Independent	Charles Aubry	691	3.0	
Co-operative Commonwealth	Louis-Philippe Lebel	281	1.2	
Total valid votes		23,081	100.0	

1940 Canadian federal election: Terrebonne
Party	Candidate	Votes	%	±%
Independent Liberal	Lionel Bertrand	7,839	44.9	
Liberal	Louis-Étienne Parent	6,938	39.8	-25.3
National Government	Léopold Lachapelle	2,668	15.3	-11.9
Total valid votes		17,445	100.0	

Note: "National Government" vote is compared to Conservative vote in 1935 election.
