= Francis Fox =

Canadian politician (1939–2024)

The Honourable Francis Fox PC KC

Secretary of State for Canada
- In office March 3, 1980 – September 21, 1981
- Prime Minister: Pierre Trudeau
- Preceded by: David MacDonald
- Succeeded by: Gerald Regan

Minister of Communications
- In office March 3, 1980 – June 29, 1984
- Prime Minister: Pierre Trudeau
- Preceded by: David MacDonald
- Succeeded by: Ed Lumley

Solicitor General of Canada
- In office September 14, 1976 – January 27, 1978
- Prime Minister: Pierre Trudeau
- Preceded by: Warren Allmand
- Succeeded by: Jean-Jacques Blais

Senator for Victoria, Quebec
- In office August 29, 2005 – December 2, 2011
- Appointed by: Paul Martin
- Preceded by: Leo Kolber
- Succeeded by: Jean-Guy Dagenais

Member of Parliament for Blainville—Deux-Montagnes (Argenteuil—Deux-Montagnes; 1972–1979)
- In office October 30, 1972 – September 4, 1984
- Preceded by: Riding established
- Succeeded by: Monique Landry

Personal details
- Born: December 2, 1939 Montreal, Quebec, Canada
- Died: September 24, 2024 (aged 84)
- Party: Liberal
- Portfolio: Parliamentary Secretary to the Minister of Justice and Attorney General of Canada (1975–1976)

Francis Fox PC KC (December 2, 1939 – September 24, 2024) was a Canadian politician who was a member of the Senate, Cabinet minister, and Principal Secretary in the Prime Minister's Office, and thus was a senior aide to Prime Minister Paul Martin. He also worked as a lobbyist in the 1980s.

== Life and career ==
Born in Montreal, Quebec, Fox was a lawyer by training. He was first elected to the House of Commons of Canada in the 1972 election as a Liberal Member of Parliament (MP) for the riding of Argenteuil—Deux-Montagnes, Quebec. He was re-elected in the 1974 election from the same constituency. In the 1979 and 1980 elections, he was returned as MP for Blainville—Deux-Montagnes before being defeated in that riding in the 1984 election.

Fox was appointed to the Cabinet of Prime Minister Pierre Trudeau in 1976 when he became Solicitor General of Canada. Bilingual, Fox was seen as an up-and-comer in the Liberal cabinet, and even a potential party leader. However, he was forced to resign on January 27, 1978, when it became known that he had forged the signature of his lover's husband on a form granting permission for her to have an abortion. Although he was married at the time of the scandal, he subsequently divorced his wife (m. 1965), Joan Pennefather. He later married a subsequent lover, Vivian Case (b. 1950). He was until his death married (~1979) to Case, who is a visual artist, and had three children.

Fox returned to Cabinet after the 1980 election when Trudeau appointed him to the position of Secretary of State for Canada and Minister of Communications. He then served as Minister of International Trade in 1984 in the short-lived government of Trudeau's successor, John Turner.

With the defeat of the Turner government and the loss of his own seat, Fox returned to the private sector. He became a lobbyist and a member of Government Consultants International, a consulting firm, with Frank Moores, Gary Ouellet, and Gerald Doucet. Subsequently, he was a senior partner in the law firm of Martineau Walker, and later as an executive at Rogers AT&T Wireless.

In 2003, Fox became a senior member of Paul Martin's transition team as he prepared to succeed Jean Chrétien as prime minister. In 2004, Fox became Martin's principal secretary, but it was announced on August 18 that he would be leaving the position on October 1 to return to private life.

Following his resignation, Fox served as president of former cabinet minister Liza Frulla's riding association. He was also an early prominent supporter of former Liberal leader Michael Ignatieff.

Fox was appointed to the Senate on Martin's recommendation on August 29, 2005, and announced his resignation on November 30, 2011, effective December 2.

Fox died on September 24, 2024, at the age of 84.
