= Paul Mercier (Bloc Québécois MP) =

Canadian politician

Member of Parliament for Terrebonne—Blainville (Blainville—Deux-Montagnes; 1993–1997)
- In office October 25, 1993 – November 27, 2000
- Preceded by: Monique Landry
- Succeeded by: Diane Bourgeois

Mayor of Blainville, Quebec
- In office 1977–1993
- Preceded by: André De Carufel
- Succeeded by: Onil Charron

Personal details
- Born: 26 July 1924 Brussels, Belgium
- Died: 7 August 2013 (aged 89)
- Party: Bloc Québécois

Paul Mercier (26 July 1924 – 7 August 2013) was a member of the House of Commons of Canada from 1993 to 2000. By career, he was a professor and businessman.

Born in Brussels, Belgium, he was elected in the Blainville—Deux-Montagnes electoral district under the Bloc Québécois party in the 1993 federal election. He was re-elected in Terrebonne—Blainville riding in the 1997 federal election. He served in the 35th and 36th Canadian Parliaments and left Canadian politics in 2000 without seeking a third term in Parliament.

From 1977 to 1993, Mercier served as Mayor of Blainville. He died 7 August 2013.

Mercier served in the Belgian Army from 1944 to 1945.
