= Raymond Raymond =

Canadian lawyer and politician

Member of the Canadian Parliament for Terrebonne
- In office 1957–1958
- Preceded by: Lionel Bertrand
- Succeeded by: Marcel Deschambault

Personal details
- Born: January 18, 1905 Labelle, Quebec, Canada
- Died: March 18, 1978 (aged 73)
- Party: Liberal Party (1957-)

Raymond Raymond (January 18, 1905 – March 18, 1978) was a Canadian lawyer and politician. First elected to represent the riding of Terrebonne, Quebec as a Liberal in the 1957 federal election he was a Member of Parliament in the House of Commons of Canada for less than a year, losing his seat in the 1958 federal election that returned a Conservative majority government.

== Electoral record ==
1957 Canadian federal election: Terrebonne
| Party | Candidate | Votes | % |
|---|---|---|---|
| Liberal | Raymond Raymond | 19,515 | 60.1 |
| Progressive Conservative | Marcel Deschambault | 12,973 | 39.9 |
| Total valid votes | | 32,488 | 100.0 |
