= Jean-Marc Robitaille =

Canadian politician

Member of Parliament for Terrebonne
- In office 1988–1993
- Preceded by: Robert Toupin
- Succeeded by: Benoît Sauvageau

Personal details
- Born: 11 September 1955 (age 70) Lévis, Quebec, Canada
- Party: Progressive Conservative; Équipe Robitaille
- Profession: real estate

Jean-Marc Robitaille (born 11 September 1955) was a member of the House of Commons of Canada from 1988 to 1993 and was the mayor of Terrebonne, Quebec from 1997 to 2016. His career was in real estate. On March 15, 2018, he was arrested by the Unité permanente anticorruption and faces criminal accusations of corruption and abuse of trust from his time as mayor.

Born in Lévis, Quebec, Robitaille was elected in the 1988 federal election at the Terrebonne electoral district for the Progressive Conservative party. He served in the 34th Canadian Parliament after which he was defeated by Bloc Québécois candidate Benoît Sauvageau in the 1993 federal election.

He became mayor of Terrebonne on 2 November 1997 and was acclaimed for another term in the 2005 municipal election. He was subsequently re-elected in 2009, and 2013.

== Electoral record ==
1993 Canadian federal election: Terrebonne
Party	Candidate	Votes	%	±%
Bloc Québécois	Benoît Sauvageau	58,030	68.87	
Liberal	Claire Brouillet	15,102	17.92	-0.62
Progressive Conservative	Jean-Marc Robitaille	9,825	11.66	-41.09
New Democratic	Renée-Claude Lorimier	900	1.07	-9.67
Commonwealth of Canada	Christian Chouery	403	0.48	
Total valid votes		84,260	95.50	
Total rejected ballots		3,973	4.50	+2.09
Turnout		88,233	79.12	+5.29
Eligible voters		111,511		
Bloc Québécois gain from Progressive Conservative		Swing		+54.98
Source: Canadian Elections Database

1988 Canadian federal election: Terrebonne
Party	Candidate	Votes	%	±%
Progressive Conservative	Jean-Marc Robitaille	35,345	52.76	-7.55
Liberal	Claire Brouillet	12,422	18.54	-7.66
Independent	Robert Toupin	10,390	15.51	
New Democratic	Lauraine Vaillancourt	7,194	10.74	+1.86
Rhinoceros	Alain Cowboy De Lagrave	1,647	2.46	
Total valid votes		66,998	97.59	
Total rejected ballots		1,655	2.41	+0.21
Turnout		68,653	73.84	-1.09
Eligible voters		68,653		
Progressive Conservative hold		Swing		+0.06
Source: Elections Canada
