= Louise Chabot =

Canadian politician

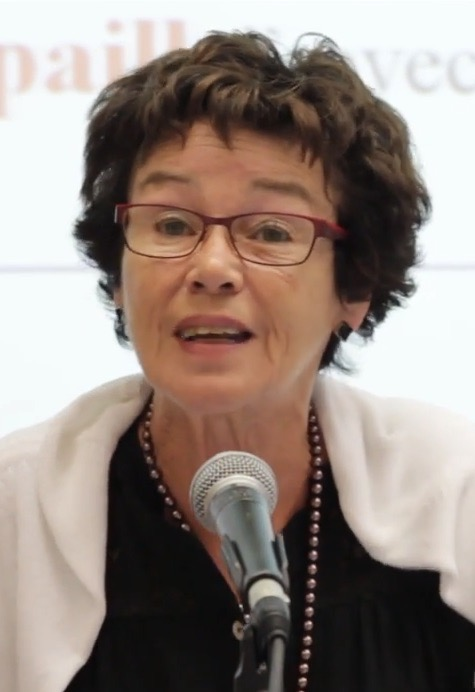
- Chabot in 2016

Member of Parliament for Thérèse-De Blainville
- In office October 21, 2019 – March 23, 2025
- Preceded by: Ramez Ayoub
- Succeeded by: Madeleine Chenette

Personal details
- Born: 1955 (age 70–71) Saint-Charles-de-Bellechasse, Quebec
- Party: Bloc Québécois

Louise Chabot (born 1955) is a Canadian politician who was elected to represent the riding of Thérèse-De Blainville in the 2019 Canadian federal election as a member of the Bloc Québécois. She was re-elected in the 2021 election. She did not seek re-election in 2025.

== Political career ==
From 2021 to 2025 she served as the critic of human resources, skills development, social development and people with disabilities in the Bloc Québécois Shadow Cabinet.

== Electoral record ==
2021 Canadian federal election: Thérèse-De Blainville
Party	Candidate	Votes	%	±%	Expenditures
Bloc Québécois	Louise Chabot	21,526	41.2	-0.6	$18,256.83
Liberal	Ramez Ayoub	18,396	35.2	-0.6	$62,921.55
Conservative	Marc Bissonnette	5,773	11.0	+2.0	$3,464.83
New Democratic	Julienne Soumaoro	3,827	7.3	-0.3	$309.35
People's	Vincent Aubé	1,386	2.7	+2.1	$578.27
Green	Simon Paré-Poupart	1,018	1.9	-2.7	$252.95
Free	Peggy Tassignon	362	0.7	N/A	$0.00
Total valid votes/expense limit		52,288	98.3	–	$113,238.74
Total rejected ballots		915	1.7		
Turnout		53,203	63.8		
Registered voters		83,459			
Bloc Québécois hold		Swing		±0.0	
Source: Elections Canada

2019 Canadian federal election: Thérèse-De Blainville
Party	Candidate	Votes	%	±%	Expenditures
Bloc Québécois	Louise Chabot	24,486	41.8	+14.71	$10,029.76
Liberal	Ramez Ayoub	20,988	35.8	+3.3	$63,057.06
Conservative	Marie Claude Fournier	5,264	9.0	-3.44	none listed
New Democratic	Hannah Wolker	4,431	7.6	-17.33	$198.59
Green	Normand Beaudet	2,710	4.6	+2.2	$0.00
People's	Désiré Mounanga	366	0.6		$3,675.10
Rhinoceros	Alain Lamontagne	289	0.4		$0.00
Independent	Andy Piano	89	0.2		$0.00
Total valid votes/expense limit		58,549	100.0		
Total rejected ballots		933			
Turnout		59,482	72.1		
Eligible voters		82,488			
Bloc Québécois gain from Liberal		Swing		+5.71	
Source: Elections Canada
