= Gédéon Rochon =

Canadian politician

Gédéon Rochon (1877 – February 11, 1917) was a lawyer and political figure in Quebec. He represented Terrebonne in the House of Commons of Canada from 1915 to 1917 as a Conservative.

He was born in Saint-Jérôme, Quebec, the son of David Rochon and Célina Nantel, and was educated at the Séminaire de Sainte-Thérèse and the Université Laval. Rochon was called to the Quebec bar in 1902 and practised law at Saint-Jérôme. In 1909, he married Victorine Prévost. He was elected to the House of Commons in a 1915 by-election held after his uncle Wilfrid Bruno Nantel was named Railway Commissioner. Rochon died in office in Saint-Jérôme at the age of 40.

Another uncle Guillaume-Alphonse Nantel also served in the House of Commons.

Canadian federal by-election, 8 February 1915
Party	Candidate	Votes	%
Conservative	Gédéon Rochon	2,193	53.6
Unknown	Joseph-Alphonse Beaulieu	1,895	46.4
Total valid votes		4,088	100.0
Called upon Mr. Nantel being appointed Railway Commissioner, 20 October 1914.
