= Ramez Ayoub =

Canadian Liberal politician

Member of Parliament for Thérèse-De Blainville
- In office October 19, 2015 – September 11, 2019
- Preceded by: Riding Established
- Succeeded by: Louise Chabot

Mayor of Lorraine
- In office December 1, 2009 – November 10, 2015
- Preceded by: Boniface Dalle-Vedove
- Succeeded by: Jean Comtois

Lorraine City Councillor
- In office December 1, 1999 – December 1, 2009
- Preceded by: Raymond Léger
- Succeeded by: Jean Comtois
- Constituency: Seat 1

Personal details
- Born: 1966 (age 59–60) Syria
- Party: Liberal
- Education: Université de Montréal

Ramez Ayoub is a Canadian Liberal politician, who was elected to represent the riding of Thérèse-De Blainville in the House of Commons of Canada from the 2015 federal election until the 2019 Canadian federal election.

Ayoub attended the Université de Montréal, earning a bachelor's degree in economics. He worked as a real estate broker, and entered politics by serving ten years on the city council of Lorraine, before being elected mayor of Lorraine in 2009, a position he held until his election to Parliament in 2015. Ayoub also served, prior to his election to Parliament, as deputy prefect of Thérèse-De Blainville Regional County Municipality. He was a recipient of the Queen Elizabeth II Diamond Jubilee Medal.

== Electoral record ==
=== Federal ===
2021 Canadian federal election: Thérèse-De Blainville
Party	Candidate	Votes	%	±%	Expenditures
Bloc Québécois	Louise Chabot	21,526	41.2	-0.6	$18,256.83
Liberal	Ramez Ayoub	18,396	35.2	-0.6	$62,921.55
Conservative	Marc Bissonnette	5,773	11.0	+2.0	$3,464.83
New Democratic	Julienne Soumaoro	3,827	7.3	-0.3	$309.35
People's	Vincent Aubé	1,386	2.7	+2.1	$578.27
Green	Simon Paré-Poupart	1,018	1.9	-2.7	$252.95
Free	Peggy Tassignon	362	0.7	N/A	$0.00
Total valid votes/expense limit		52,288	98.3	–	$113,238.74
Total rejected ballots		915	1.7		
Turnout		53,203	63.8		
Registered voters		83,459			
Bloc Québécois hold		Swing		±0.0	
Source: Elections Canada

2019 Canadian federal election: Thérèse-De Blainville
Party	Candidate	Votes	%	±%	Expenditures
Bloc Québécois	Louise Chabot	24,486	41.8	+14.71	$10,029.76
Liberal	Ramez Ayoub	20,988	35.8	+3.3	$63,057.06
Conservative	Marie Claude Fournier	5,264	9.0	-3.44	none listed
New Democratic	Hannah Wolker	4,431	7.6	-17.33	$198.59
Green	Normand Beaudet	2,710	4.6	+2.2	$0.00
People's	Désiré Mounanga	366	0.6		$3,675.10
Rhinoceros	Alain Lamontagne	289	0.4		$0.00
Independent	Andy Piano	89	0.2		$0.00
Total valid votes/expense limit		58,549	100.0		
Total rejected ballots		933			
Turnout		59,482	72.1		
Eligible voters		82,488			
Bloc Québécois gain from Liberal		Swing		+5.71	
Source: Elections Canada

2015 Canadian federal election: Thérèse-De Blainville
Party	Candidate	Votes	%	±%	Expenditures
Liberal	Ramez Ayoub	18,281	32.5	+22.24	–
Bloc Québécois	Alain Marginean	15,238	27.1	-0.75	–
New Democratic	Alain Giguère	14,022	24.9	-25.14	–
Conservative	Manuel Puga	7,013	12.4	+2.64	–
Green	Andrew Carkner	1,449	2.4	+0.31	–
Libertarian	Daniel Guindon	425	0.6	–	–
Total valid votes/Expense limit		56,248	100.0		$213,550.54
Total rejected ballots		1,007	–	–	
Turnout		57,255	–	–	
Eligible voters		78,804			
Source: Elections Canada

=== Municipal ===
2013 Lorraine mayoral election
Candidate	Party	Vote	%
Ramez Ayoub (x)	Équipe Ayoub	1,632	40.14
Lyne Rémillard	Autrement Lorraine - Équipe Rémillard	1,371	33.72
Sylvain Fortin	Équipe Fortin	562	13.82
Martin Lacasse	Agir avec Lacasse	501	12.32
Total		4,066	100.00

2009 Lorraine mayoral election
Candidate	Party	Vote	%
Ramez Ayoub	Équipe Ayoub	1,809	51.1
Boniface Dalle-Vedove (x)	Équipe Dalle-Vedove	1,730	48.9
Total		3,539	100.00
