= Joseph-Adolphe Chapleau =

5th Premier of Quebec (1879–1882)

The Honourable Sir Joseph-Adolphe Chapleau PC KCMG
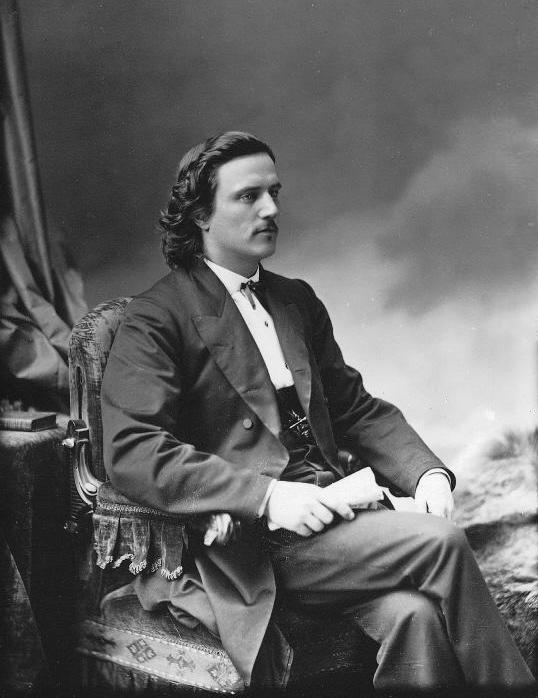
- Chapleau, c. 1869

7th Lieutenant Governor of Quebec
- In office December 5, 1892 – January 20, 1898
- Monarch: Victoria
- Governors General: The Lord Stanley of Preston; The Earl of Aberdeen
- Premier: Charles Boucher de Boucherville; Louis-Olivier Taillon; Edmund James Flynn; Félix-Gabriel Marchand
- Preceded by: Auguste-Réal Angers
- Succeeded by: Louis-Amable Jetté

5th Premier of Quebec
- In office October 31, 1879 – July 29, 1882
- Monarch: Victoria
- Lieutenant Governor: Théodore Robitaille
- Preceded by: Henri-Gustave Joly de Lotbinière
- Succeeded by: Joseph-Alfred Mousseau

Member of the Canadian Parliament for Terrebonne
- In office July 29, 1882 – December 5, 1892
- Preceded by: Guillaume-Alphonse Nantel
- Succeeded by: Pierre-Julien Leclair

MLA for Terrebonne
- In office September 1, 1867 – July 29, 1882
- Preceded by: Provincial district created in 1867
- Succeeded by: Guillaume-Alphonse Nantel

Personal details
- Born: November 9, 1840 Sainte-Thérèse, Lower Canada
- Died: June 13, 1898 (aged 57) Montreal, Quebec, Canada
- Party: Conservative Party of Quebec
- Other political affiliations: Conservative
- Spouse: Marie-Louise King (m. 1874)
- Cabinet: Solicitor General (1873–1874); Minister Without Portfolio (1876–1878); Provincial Secretary (1876–1878); Commissioner of Agriculture and Public Works (1879–1881); Commissioner of Railways (1880–1881); Secretary of State of Canada (1882–1892); Minister of Customs (1892)

Sir Joseph-Adolphe Chapleau PC KCMG (French pronunciation: [ʒozɛf adɔlf ʃaplo]; November 9, 1840 – June 13, 1898), born in Sainte-Thérèse, Quebec, was a French-Canadian lawyer and politician who served as the 7th Lieutenant Governor of Quebec from 1892 to 1898.

== Life ==
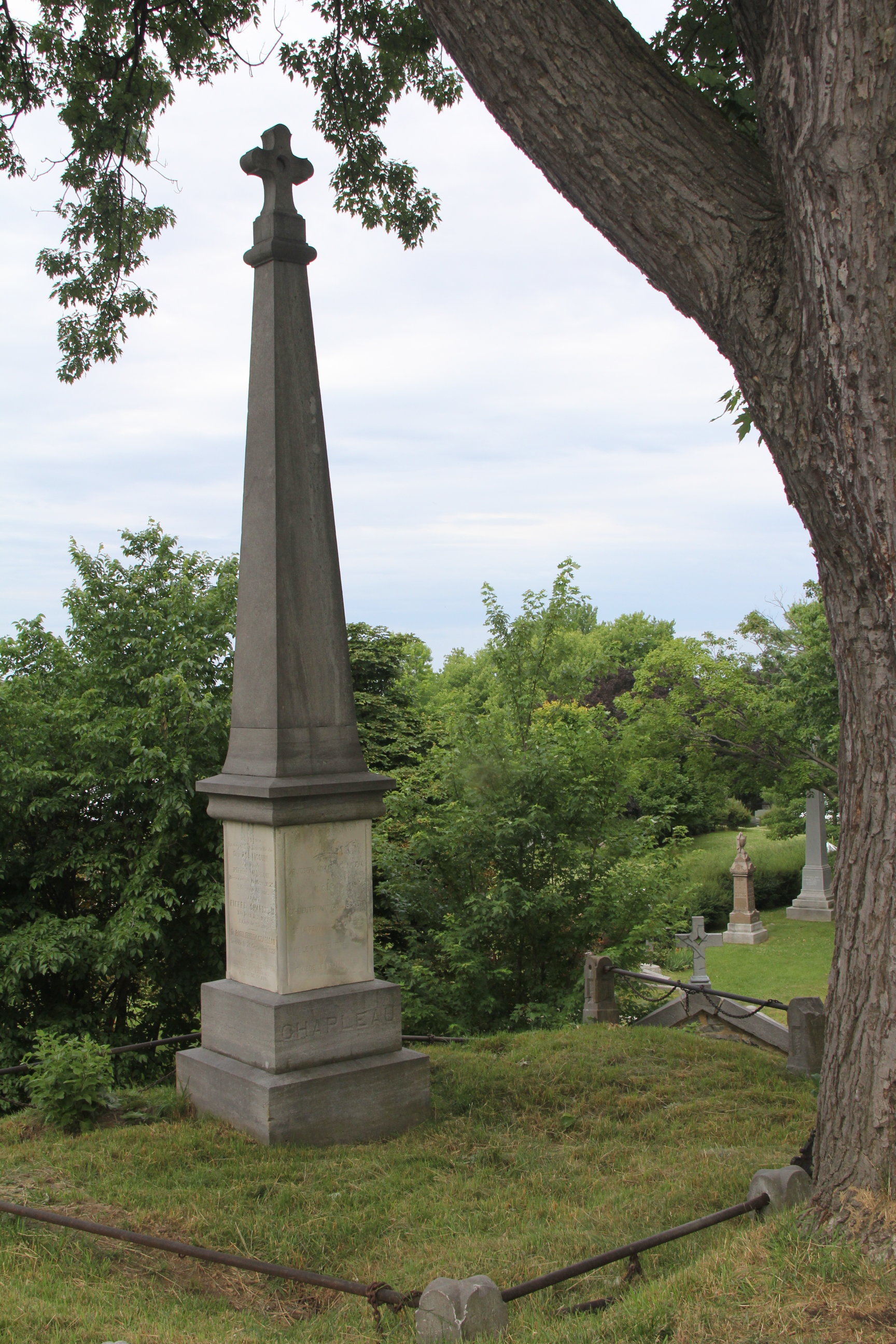
Funeral monument of Joseph-Adolphe Chapleau in the Notre Dame des Neiges Cemetery.

As a lawyer, he defended Ambroise-Dydime Lépine against the charge of murdering Thomas Scott during the Red River Rebellion of 1869–1870.

He served as the fifth premier of Quebec, federal Cabinet minister, and the seventh lieutenant governor of Quebec.

After the 1878 Quebec election, he was the Leader of the Opposition. He became premier in 1879 after the fall of the minority government of Henri-Gustave Joly de Lotbinière. He won the 1881 election, but resigned on July 29, 1882, to seek election to the federal House of Commons. He won a by-election held on August 16, 1882.

Chapleau planned to quit politics in 1885 when Louis Riel was sentenced to be hanged but decided to stay, fearing it would only inflame the situation. After Riel was hanged, he was attacked by Quebecers who accused him of the death of Riel along with John A. Macdonald.

He served as Minister of Justice under prime ministers John A. Macdonald and John Abbott, but declined to serve under John Thompson. He resigned in 1892, and was appointed Lieutenant Governor of Quebec from December 1892 until January 1898. He died in June of that same year in Montreal, Quebec. His funeral monument can be seen at the Notre Dame des Neiges Cemetery.

== Elections as party leader ==
He won the 1881 election.

== Family ==
On November 25, 1874, he married Marie Louise, daughter of Lieutenant-colonel Charles King of Sherbrooke in the province of Quebec.

== Legacy ==
The community of Chapleau, Ontario was named for him.

== Electoral record ==
1891 Canadian federal election: Terrebonne
Party	Candidate	Votes	%	±%
Conservative	Joseph-Adolphe Chapleau	1,830	61.9	-1.8
Liberal	M.D. Limoges	1,126	38.1	+1.8
Total valid votes		2,956	100.0	

1887 Canadian federal election: Terrebonne
Party	Candidate	Votes	%	±%
Conservative	Joseph-Adolphe Chapleau	1,819	63.8	-1.8
Liberal	M.J. Therrien	1,034	36.2	
Total valid votes		2,853	100.0	

By-election on 16 August 1882 To allow Mr. Chapleau to run for office.
Party	Candidate	Votes
Conservative	Joseph-Adolphe Chapleau	acclaimed

Note: popular vote is compared to vote in 1882 general election.

== See also ==
- List of Quebec general elections
- Politics of Quebec
- Provincial premiers who have become Canadian MPs
- Timeline of Quebec history
