= Robert Toupin =

Canadian politician (born 1949)

Robert Toupin MP

Member of Parliament for Terrebonne
- In office 1984–1988
- Preceded by: Joseph-Roland Comtois
- Succeeded by: Jean-Marc Robitaille

Personal details
- Born: January 20, 1949 (age 77) L'Assomption, Quebec, Canada
- Party: Progressive Conservative (1984-1986); Independent (1986, 1987-1988); New Democratic (1986-1987)

Robert Toupin (born January 20, 1949) is a former Canadian politician who served as the member of Parliament (MP) in the House of Commons for the riding of Terrebonne from 1984 to 1988.

Toupin had been a worker for the Quebec Liberal Party when he joined the Progressive Conservative Party of Canada following Brian Mulroney's election as party leader. Toupin was a successful Tory candidate in Terrebonne riding in the 1984 federal election.

Critical of the new government's policies, he crossed the floor in May 1986 to sit as an independent. He attempted to join the Liberal Party of Canada but the Liberal riding association for the constituency he represented rejected him. He ultimately joined the New Democratic Party (NDP), becoming the first NDP MP from a Quebec riding. However, in October 1987, he left the party after ten months to again sit as an independent, after claiming that the party was dominated by the extreme left.

Toupin was defeated as an independent candidate in the 1988 federal election.

== Electoral record ==
1988 Canadian federal election: Terrebonne
Party	Candidate	Votes	%	±%
Progressive Conservative	Jean-Marc Robitaille	35,345	52.76	-7.55
Liberal	Claire Brouillet	12,422	18.54	-7.66
Independent	Robert Toupin	10,390	15.51	
New Democratic	Lauraine Vaillancourt	7,194	10.74	+1.86
Rhinoceros	Alain Cowboy De Lagrave	1,647	2.46	
Total valid votes		66,998	97.59	
Total rejected ballots		1,655	2.41	+0.21
Turnout		68,653	73.84	-1.09
Eligible voters		68,653		
Progressive Conservative hold		Swing		+0.06
Source: Elections Canada

1984 Canadian federal election: Terrebonne
Party	Candidate	Votes	%	±%
Progressive Conservative	Robert Toupin	43,822	60.30	+51.19
Liberal	Joseph-Roland Comtois	19,040	26.20	-42.20
New Democratic	Brian Umansky	6,454	8.88	-4.04
Parti nationaliste	Jean-A. Bonin	3,060	4.21	
Commonwealth of Canada	Claude Brosseau	292	0.40	
Total valid votes		72,668	97.80	
Total rejected ballots		1,634	2.20	+0.82
Turnout		74,302	74.93	+7.98
Electors on the lists		99,162		
Progressive Conservative gain from Liberal		Swing		+46.70
Source: Report of the Chief Electoral Officer, Thirty-third General Election, 1984.
