= Thérèse-De Blainville =

Federal electoral district in Quebec, Canada

Quebec electoral district
- Interactive map of riding boundaries from the 2025 federal election

Federal electoral district
- Legislature: House of Commons
MP
Madeleine Chenette
Liberal
- District created: 2013
- First contested: 2015
- Last contested: 2025
- District webpage: profile, map

Demographics
- Population (2011): 98,499
- Electors (2015): 78,804
- Area (km²): 77
- Pop. density (per km²): 1,279.2
- Census division: Thérèse-De Blainville
- Census subdivision(s): Terrebonne (part), Blainville, Sainte-Thérèse, Bois-des-Filion, Lorraine

Thérèse-De Blainville (French pronunciation: [teʁɛz də blɛ̃vil]) is a federal electoral district in Quebec.

== Demographics ==
According to the 2021 Canadian census

Ethnic groups: 87.5% White, 3.6% Black, 3.0% Arab, 1.7% Latin American, 1.3% Indigenous

Languages: 83.0% French, 4.2% English, 1.9% Arabic, 1.7% Spanish

Religions: 66.6% Christian (56.4% Catholic, 1.7% Christian Orthodox, 8.5% Other), 3.6% Muslim, 29.0% None

Median income: $46,000 (2020)

Average income: $59,500 (2020)

== History ==
The riding was originally intended to be named Blainville. The riding was created by the 2012 federal electoral boundaries redistribution and was legally defined in the 2013 representation order. It came into effect upon the call of the 2015 Canadian federal election. The riding was created from parts of Terrebonne—Blainville (51%) and Marc-Aurèle-Fortin (49%). Following the 2022 Canadian federal electoral redistribution, the riding gained the area west of Boul. des Laurentides from Terrebonne.

== Members of Parliament ==
This riding has elected the following members of Parliament:

Parliament	Years	Member	Party
Thérèse-De Blainville; Riding created from Marc-Aurèle-Fortin and Terrebonne—Blainville
42nd	2015–2019	Ramez Ayoub	Liberal
43rd	2019–2021	Louise Chabot	Bloc Québécois
44th	2021–2025	Louise Chabot	Bloc Québécois
45th	2025–present	Madeleine Chenette	Liberal

== Election results ==
Graph of election results in Thérèse-De-Blainville (minor parties that never got 2% of the vote or didn't run consistently are omitted)

2025 Canadian federal election
Party	Candidate	Votes	%	±%	Expenditures
Liberal	Madeleine Chenette	29,519	45.84	+10.64	
Bloc Québécois	Marie-Noëlle Closson-Duquette	20,828	32.34	–8.60	
Conservative	Julie Bergeron	12,019	18.66	+7.62	
New Democratic	Michel Lacroix	1,585	2.46	–4.81	
People's	Chantal Lavoie	446	0.69	–1.99	
Total valid votes/expense limit		64,397	98.37		
Total rejected ballots		1,069	1.63		
Turnout		65,466	72.81		
Eligible voters		89,917			
Liberal notional gain from Bloc Québécois		Swing		+9.62	
Source: Elections Canada

2021 federal election redistributed results
Party	Vote	%
Bloc Québécois	22,498	40.94
Liberal	19,343	35.20
Conservative	6,070	11.04
New Democratic	3,998	7.27
People's	1,474	2.68
Green	1,063	1.93
Others	511	0.93

2021 Canadian federal election
Party	Candidate	Votes	%	±%	Expenditures
Bloc Québécois	Louise Chabot	21,526	41.2	-0.6	$18,256.83
Liberal	Ramez Ayoub	18,396	35.2	-0.6	$62,921.55
Conservative	Marc Bissonnette	5,773	11.0	+2.0	$3,464.83
New Democratic	Julienne Soumaoro	3,827	7.3	-0.3	$309.35
People's	Vincent Aubé	1,386	2.7	+2.1	$578.27
Green	Simon Paré-Poupart	1,018	1.9	-2.7	$252.95
Free	Peggy Tassignon	362	0.7	N/A	$0.00
Total valid votes/expense limit		52,288	98.3	–	$113,238.74
Total rejected ballots		915	1.7		
Turnout		53,203	63.8		
Registered voters		83,459			
Bloc Québécois hold		Swing		±0.0	
Source: Elections Canada

2019 Canadian federal election
Party	Candidate	Votes	%	±%	Expenditures
Bloc Québécois	Louise Chabot	24,486	41.8	+14.71	$10,029.76
Liberal	Ramez Ayoub	20,988	35.8	+3.3	$63,057.06
Conservative	Marie Claude Fournier	5,264	9.0	-3.44	none listed
New Democratic	Hannah Wolker	4,431	7.6	-17.33	$198.59
Green	Normand Beaudet	2,710	4.6	+2.2	$0.00
People's	Désiré Mounanga	366	0.6		$3,675.10
Rhinoceros	Alain Lamontagne	289	0.4		$0.00
Independent	Andy Piano	89	0.2		$0.00
Total valid votes/expense limit		58,549	100.0		
Total rejected ballots		933			
Turnout		59,482	72.1		
Eligible voters		82,488			
Bloc Québécois gain from Liberal		Swing		+5.71	
Source: Elections Canada

2015 Canadian federal election
Party	Candidate	Votes	%	±%	Expenditures
Liberal	Ramez Ayoub	18,281	32.50	+22.24	$35,214.56
Bloc Québécois	Alain Marginean	15,238	27.09	-0.76	$36,603.04
New Democratic	Alain Giguère	14,022	24.93	-25.11	$19,303.10
Conservative	Manuel Puga	7,000	12.44	+2.69	$9,135.41
Green	Andrew Carkner	1,352	2.40	+0.31	$1,781.33
Libertarian	Daniel Guindon	355	0.63	–	$1,138.15
Total valid votes/Expense limit		56,248	100.00		$214,228.71
Total rejected ballots		1,007	1.76	–	
Turnout		57,255	72.16	–	
Eligible voters		79.347			
Liberal gain from New Democratic		Swing		+23.67	
Source: Elections Canada

2011 federal election redistributed results
Party	Vote	%
New Democratic	24,180	50.04
Bloc Québécois	13,456	27.85
Liberal	4,960	10.26
Conservative	4,715	9.76
Green	1,012	2.09

== See also ==
- List of Canadian electoral districts
- Historical federal electoral districts of Canada
