= Marcel Deschambault =

Canadian politician

Member of Parliament for Terrebonne
- In office March 1958 – June 1962
- Preceded by: Raymond Raymond
- Succeeded by: Léo Cadieux

Personal details
- Born: 29 October 1916 Saint-Jérôme, Quebec, Canada
- Died: 11 June 1969 (aged 52)
- Party: Progressive Conservative
- Spouse: Mérilda Huot
- Profession: accountant

Marcel Deschambault (29 October 1916 at Saint-Jérôme, Quebec – 11 June 1969) was a Progressive Conservative party member of the House of Commons of Canada. He was an accountant by career. He married Mérilda Huot on 11 November 1939, with whom he had three daughters.

He was first elected at the Terrebonne riding in the 1958 general election after an unsuccessful attempt there in the 1957 election. After serving his only federal term, in the 24th Canadian Parliament, he was defeated at Terrebonne by Léo Cadieux of the Liberal Party in the 1962 election. He then returned to private work as an accountant, and later as a bailiff. He was sworn in as Clerk of the Saint-Antoine on 16 September 1968, a position he held until his death on 11 June 1969.

== Electoral record ==
1958 Canadian federal election: Terrebonne
Party	Candidate	Votes	%	±%
Progressive Conservative	Marcel Deschambault	19,319	51.4	+11.5
Liberal	Raymond Raymond	18,241	48.6	-11.5
Total valid votes		37,560	100.0	
