= Samuel Desjardins =

Canadian politician

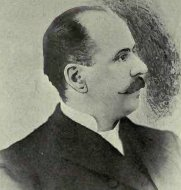

Member of the Canadian Parliament for Terrebonne
- In office 1903–1908
- Preceded by: Raymond Préfontaine
- Succeeded by: Wilfrid Bruno Nantel

Personal details
- Born: July 25, 1852 Ste-Thérèse, Canada East
- Died: December 4, 1924 (aged 72)
- Party: Liberal

Samuel Desjardins (July 25, 1852 – December 4, 1924) was a Canadian politician.

Born in Ste-Thérèse, Canada East, the son of Samuel Desjardins and Sophie Laurier, Desjardins was educated at the College of Ste-Thérèse de Blainville. A physician, He was first elected to the House of Commons of Canada for the electoral district of Terrebonne in a 1903 by-election held to fill the vacancy caused by Raymond Préfontaine choosing to sit for the riding of Maisonneuve, after having been elected in the two constituencies. A Liberal, he was re-elected at the general elections of 1904 and was defeated in 1908.

== Electoral record ==
1904 Canadian federal election: Terrebonne
Party	Candidate	Votes	%	±%
Liberal	Samuel Desjardins	2,481	51.9	-1.5
Conservative	W. Bruno Nantel	2,297	48.1	+1.5
Total valid votes		4,778	100.0	

Canadian federal by-election, 24 February 1903: Terrebonne
Party	Candidate	Votes	%	±%
Préfontaine was appointed Minister of Marine and Fisheries, 11 November 1902
Liberal	Samuel Desjardins	2,325	53.4	+0.3
Conservative	A.H. Masson	2,029	46.6	-0.3
Total valid votes		4,354	100.0	
