= Madeleine Chenette =

Canadian politician

Madeleine Chenette MP

Parliamentary Secretary to the Minister of Canadian Identity and Culture
- Incumbent
- Assumed office June 5, 2025

Parliamentary Secretary to the Secretary of State (Sport)
- Incumbent
- Assumed office June 5, 2025

Member of Parliament for Thérèse-De Blainville
- Incumbent
- Assumed office April 28, 2025
- Preceded by: Louise Chabot

Personal details
- Party: Liberal
- Website: madeleinechenette.liberal.ca/en/

Madeleine Chenette MP is a Canadian politician and diplomat from the Liberal Party of Canada. She was elected Member of Parliament for Thérèse-De Blainville in the 2025 Canadian federal election.

Chenette has had a career in the public and private sectors. She previously served as Canada's ambassador to the OECD in Paris.

At the time of the 2025 Canadian federal election, she lived in Amherst, Quebec.

== Electoral record ==
2025 Canadian federal election: Thérèse-De Blainville
Party	Candidate	Votes	%	±%	Expenditures
Liberal	Madeleine Chenette	29,519	45.84	+10.64	
Bloc Québécois	Marie-Noëlle Closson-Duquette	20,828	32.34	–8.60	
Conservative	Julie Bergeron	12,019	18.66	+7.62	
New Democratic	Michel Lacroix	1,585	2.46	–4.81	
People's	Chantal Lavoie	446	0.69	–1.99	
Total valid votes/expense limit		64,397	98.37		
Total rejected ballots		1,069	1.63		
Turnout		65,466	72.81		
Eligible voters		89,917			
Liberal notional gain from Bloc Québécois		Swing		+9.62	
Source: Elections Canada
