= Diane Bourgeois =

Canadian politician

Member of Parliament for Terrebonne—Blainville
- In office 2000–2011
- Preceded by: Paul Mercier
- Succeeded by: Charmaine Borg

Personal details
- Born: November 14, 1949 (age 76) Montreal, Quebec, Canada
- Party: Bloc Québécois
- Profession: teacher

Diane Bourgeois (born November 14, 1949) is a Canadian politician. She was a Bloc Québécois Member of the House of Commons of Canada, representing the riding Terrebonne—Blainville from 2000 until 2011. She was the Bloc critic for the international cooperation portfolio — Canada's foreign-aid efforts — and is a former critic for the status of women, parental leave, and housing.

Bourgeois was born in Montreal, Quebec.

== Electoral record ==
2011 Canadian federal election
Party	Candidate	Votes	%	±%	Expenditures
New Democratic	Charmaine Borg	28,236	49.4	+35.9%	
Bloc Québécois	Diane Bourgeois	17,634	30.8	-21.5%	
Conservative	Jean-Philippe Paiement	5,222	9.1	-4.9%	
Liberal	Robert Frégeau	4,885	8.5	-8%	
Green	Michel Paulette	1,218	2.1	0%	

2008 Canadian federal election
Party	Candidate	Votes	%	±%
Bloc Québécois	Diane Bourgeois	28,303	52.3%	-6.8%
Liberal	Eva Nassif	8,937	16.5%	+7.6%
Conservative	Daniel Lebel	7,551	14.0%	-6.0%
New Democratic	Michel Le Clair	7,278	13.5%	+6.0%
Green	Martin Drapeau	1,714	3.2%	-1.2%
Independent	M. Zamboni Cadieux	283	0.5%	
Total valid votes		54,066	100.0%	
Total rejected ballots		911		
Turnout		54,977	65.9%	

2006 Canadian federal election
Party	Candidate	Votes	%	±%
Bloc Québécois	Diane Bourgeois	30,197	59.2%	-9.0%
Conservative	Daniel Lebel	10,212	20.0%	+14.4%
Liberal	Maxime Thériault	4,576	9.0%	-10.7%
New Democratic	Michel Leclair	3,829	7.5%	+4.3%
Green	Martin Drapeau	2,216	4.3%	+1.0%
Total valid votes		51,030	100.0%	
Total rejected ballots		886		
Turnout		51,916	62.3%	

2004 Canadian federal election: Terrebonne—Blainville
Party	Candidate	Votes	%	±%	Expenditures
Bloc Québécois	Diane Bourgeois	31,288	68.13	+12.75	$60,942
Liberal	Pierre Gingras	9,048	19.70	−8.94	$48,266
Conservative	Patrick Légaré	2,582	5.62	−6.13	$3,477
Green	Martin Drapeau	1,554	3.38	-	none listed
New Democratic	Normand Beaudet	1,451	3.16	+1.12	none listed
Total valid votes		45,923	100.00		
Total rejected ballots		1,252			
Turnout		47,175	63.58		
Electors on the lists		74,197			
Percentage change figures are factored for redistribution. Conservative Party percentages are contrasted with the combined Canadian Alliance and Progressive Conservative figures from 2000. Sources: Official Results, Elections Canada and Financial Returns, Elections Canada.

2000 Canadian federal election: Terrebonne—Blainville
Party	Candidate	Votes	%	±%	Expenditures
Bloc Québécois	Diane Bourgeois	28,933	51.91		$53,014
Liberal	François-Hugues Liberge	17,668	31.70	–	$43,169
Alliance	Guylaine St-Georges	3,741	6.71		$1,009
Progressive Conservative	Mélanie Gemme	3,089	5.54		none listed
Natural Law	Pascale Levert	1,193	2.14		none listed
New Democratic	Normand Beaudet	1,111	1.99		$606
Total valid votes		55,735	100.00		
Total rejected ballots		2,458			
Turnout		58,193	64.81		
Electors on the lists		89,796			
Sources: Official Results, Elections Canada and Financial Returns, Elections Canada.
