= Louis-Étienne Parent =

Canadian politician

Member of Parliament for Terrebonne
- In office July 1930 – March 1940
- Preceded by: Jules-Édouard Prévost
- Succeeded by: Lionel Bertrand

Personal details
- Born: 21 August 1875 Grenville, Quebec
- Died: 24 May 1960 (aged 84)
- Party: Liberal
- Spouse(s): Perrault m. 19 September 1898
- Profession: industrialist, lumber merchant

Louis-Étienne Parent (21 August 1875 – 24 May 1960) was a Liberal party member of the House of Commons of Canada. He was born in Grenville, Quebec and became an industrialist and lumber merchant.

Parent attended Plateau Academy in Montreal and was also privately educated.

Parent was mayor of Sainte-Agathe-des-Monts, Quebec from 1906 to 1931. In 1929, he was also President of the Lumber Merchants Association of Quebec.

He was first elected to Parliament at the Terrebonne riding in the 1930 general election then re-elected in 1935. He was defeated in the 1940 election by Lionel Bertrand, an independent Liberal candidate.

== Electoral record ==
1940 Canadian federal election: Terrebonne
Party	Candidate	Votes	%	±%
Independent Liberal	Lionel Bertrand	7,839	44.9	
Liberal	Louis-Étienne Parent	6,938	39.8	-25.3
National Government	Léopold Lachapelle	2,668	15.3	-11.9
Total valid votes		17,445	100.0	

Note: "National Government" vote is compared to Conservative vote in 1935 election.

1935 Canadian federal election: Terrebonne
Party	Candidate	Votes	%	±%
Liberal	Louis-Étienne Parent	9,900	65.1	+8.9
Conservative	Léopold Nantel	4,141	27.2	-16.6
Liberal	Eugène Léveillé	1,172	7.7	
Total valid votes		15,213	100.0	

1930 Canadian federal election: Terrebonne
Party	Candidate	Votes	%	±%
Liberal	Louis-Étienne Parent	8,609	56.1	-19.5
Conservative	Guillaume-André Fauteux	6,727	43.9	+19.5
Total valid votes		15,336	100.0	
