= Monique Landry =

Canadian politician (born 1937)

The Honourable Monique Landry PC

Minister of Communications
- In office June 25, 1993 – November 4, 1993
- Prime Minister: Kim Campbell
- Preceded by: Perrin Beatty
- Succeeded by: Michel Dupuy

Secretary of State for Canada
- In office January 4, 1993 – November 4, 1993
- Prime Minister: Brian Mulroney; Kim Campbell
- Preceded by: Robert de Cotret
- Succeeded by: Sergio Marchi

Member of Parliament for Blainville—Deux-Montagnes
- In office September 4, 1984 – October 25, 1993
- Preceded by: Francis Fox
- Succeeded by: Paul Mercier

Personal details
- Born: December 25, 1937 (age 88)
- Party: Progressive Conservative
- Occupation: Physiotherapist

Monique Landry PC (born December 25, 1937) is a former Canadian politician.

== Career ==
=== Member of Parliament ===
A physiotherapist and administrator, Landry was first elected to the House of Commons of Canada in the 1984 general election that brought the Progressive Conservative Party to power under the leadership of Brian Mulroney. Hers was an upset victory, defeating Liberal Cabinet minister Francis Fox.

The new Member of Parliament for Blainville—Deux-Montagnes, Quebec, was immediately appointed parliamentary secretary to the Secretary of State for Canada by Prime Minister Mulroney following the election. In 1985, she became parliamentary secretary to the Minister for International Trade.

=== Cabinet ===
She joined the Cabinet in 1986 as both Minister for External Relations (a junior portfolio subordinate to the Secretary of State for External Affairs) and Minister responsible for La Francophonie. From 1991 to 1993, she also served as Minister of State for Indian Affairs and Northern Development while retaining her other positions.

In January 1993, she was promoted to Secretary of State for Canada. When Kim Campbell succeeded Mulroney as Prime Minister, she appointed Landry Minister of Communications in addition to her position as Secretary of State. However, both Landry and the Campbell government were defeated in the fall 1993 general election which ended her parliamentary career.
