= Provincial premiers who have become Canadian MPs =

This is a list of Canadian politicians who served both as a provincial premier and as a member of the House of Commons of Canada. It is organized into two sections: premiers who later became federal members of Parliament, and federal members of Parliament who later became provincial premiers. Some individuals appear in both lists, having moved between the two roles at different points in their careers.

== Provincial premiers who became federal MPs ==
Premiers of Canadian provinces since Canadian Confederation who have subsequently been elected to the House of Commons of Canada.

- Dave Barrett - British Columbia
- Andrew George Blair - New Brunswick
- Edward Blake - Ontario
- John Bracken - Manitoba
- Bennett Campbell - Prince Edward Island
- Joseph-Adolphe Chapleau - Quebec
- Amor De Cosmos - British Columbia
- Louis Henry Davies - Prince Edward Island
- Ujjal Dosanjh - British Columbia
- Tommy Douglas - Saskatchewan
- George A. Drew - Ontario
- Charles Avery Dunning- Saskatchewan
- Henry Emmerson - New Brunswick
- Donald Farquharson - Prince Edward Island
- William Stevens Fielding - Nova Scotia
- Hugh John Flemming - New Brunswick
- James Kidd Flemming - New Brunswick
- James Garfield Gardiner - Saskatchewan
- Stuart Garson - Manitoba
- Lomer Gouin - Quebec
- Thomas Greenway - Manitoba
- John Douglas Hazen - New Brunswick
- Henri-Gustave Joly de Lotbinière - Quebec
- Angus Lewis Macdonald - Nova Scotia
- John Sandfield Macdonald - Ontario
- Peter Mitchell - New Brunswick
- James Colledge Pope - Prince Edward Island
- William Pugsley - New Brunswick
- Bob Rae - Ontario
- Gerald Regan - Nova Scotia
- Edgar Nelson Rhodes - Nova Scotia
- Arthur Lewis Sifton - Alberta
- Robert Stanfield - Nova Scotia
- Charles Stewart - Alberta
- John Sparrow David Thompson - Nova Scotia
- Brian Tobin - Newfoundland and Labrador
- Simon Fraser Tolmie - British Columbia
- Charles Tupper - Nova Scotia
- Alexander Warburton - Prince Edward Island
- Peter Veniot - New Brunswick

== Federal members of Parliament who became provincial premiers ==
These Canadian federal MPs subsequently were elected as provincial premiers.

- John B. M. Baxter - New Brunswick
- John Howatt Bell - Prince Edward Island
- Pat Binns - Prince Edward Island
- Lucien Bouchard - Quebec
- Catherine Callbeck - Prince Edward Island
- Joseph-Adolphe Chapleau - Quebec
- Jean Charest - Quebec
- Amor De Cosmos - British Columbia
- Tommy Douglas - Saskatchewan
- Thomas Greenway - Manitoba
- John Douglas Hazen - New Brunswick
- Mitchell Hepburn - Ontario
- Jason Kenney - Alberta
- Henri-Gustave Joly de Lotbinière - Quebec
- Jean Lesage - Quebec
- Hugh John Macdonald - Manitoba
- John Sandfield Macdonald - Ontario
- Russell MacLellan - Nova Scotia
- J. Angus MacLean - Prince Edward Island
- Joseph Martin - British Columbia
- William Melville Martin - Saskatchewan
- Frank Moores - Newfoundland and Labrador
- Joseph-Alfred Mousseau - Quebec
- Brian Pallister - Manitoba
- Jim Prentice - Alberta
- Edward Gawler Prior - British Columbia
- Gerald Regan - Nova Scotia
- Bob Rae - Ontario
- Edgar Nelson Rhodes - Nova Scotia
- John Jones Ross - Quebec
- George William Ross - Ontario
- Edward Schreyer - Manitoba
- Thomas Walter Scott - Saskatchewan
- Brian Tobin - Newfoundland and Labrador
- Simon Fraser Tolmie - British Columbia

== See also ==
- List of prime ministers of Canada
