= Antonin Nantel =

Canadian Roman Catholic priest, teacher, school administrator and author (1839-1929)

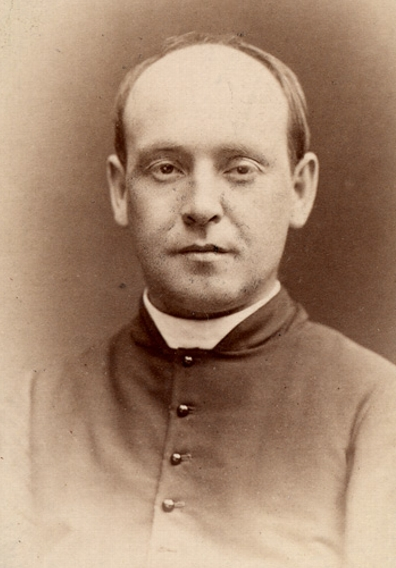
- Born: 17 September 1839; Saint-Jérôme, Lower Canada
- Died: 30 July 1929 (aged 89); Sainte-Thérèse-de-Blainville (Sainte-Thérèse), Quebec
- Relatives: Guillaume-Alphonse Nantel, brother Wilfrid Bruno Nantel, brother

Antonin Nantel (17 September 1839 – 30 July 1929) was a Canadian Roman Catholic priest, teacher, school administrator, and author.

Born in Saint-Jérôme, Lower Canada, Nantel studied at the Petit Séminaire de Sainte-Thérèse and was ordained priest in 1862. He then started teaching at the Petit Séminaire de Sainte-Thérèse. He was the author of Nouveau cours de langue anglaise selon la méthode d'Ollendorff à l'usage des écoles, académies, pensionnats et collèges. From 1870 to 1886 he was superior of the Petit Séminaire de Sainte-Thérèse (and again from 1889 to 1895 and 1900 to 1905).
