= Joseph-Roland Comtois =

Canadian politician (1929–2020)

J.-Roland Comtois
- Official 1980 portrait

Member of Parliament for Terrebonne
- In office 1968–1984
- Preceded by: Léo Cadieux
- Succeeded by: Robert Toupin

Personal details
- Born: March 3, 1929 Sainte-Julie, Quebec
- Died: October 31, 2020 (aged 91)
- Party: Liberal Party of Canada
- Profession: professional engineer, soldier

Joseph-Roland Comtois (3 March 1929 – 31 October 2020) is a former a Liberal party member of the House of Commons of Canada. He was a professional engineer, soldier and reservist by career.

== History ==
Comtois' first attempts to enter national politics were unsuccessful as he was defeated at the Joliette—L'Assomption—Montcalm riding in the 1962 and 1963 federal elections.

Comtois won the riding on his third attempt in the 1965 federal election after its Progressive Conservative incumbent, Louis-Joseph Pigeon, did not seek re-election. Following rearrangement of riding boundaries, Comtois was re-elected at Terrebonne riding in the 1968, 1972 and 1974 federal elections.

In 1976, Comtois resigned his federal seat to become a candidate in the Quebec provincial election. This attempt was unsuccessful and he won back his federal seat at Terrebonne in a 24 May 1977 by-election. He won further re-election in the 1979 and 1980 federal elections. He left federal politics after his defeat to Progressive Conservative Robert Toupin in the 1984 federal election.

Comtois served in the 27th through 32nd Canadian Parliaments, except for his brief resignation during the 30th Parliament.

In 2005, Comtois was the recipient of the Distinguished Service Award of the Canadian Association of Former Parliamentarians.

== Electoral record ==
1984 Canadian federal election: Terrebonne
Party	Candidate	Votes	%	±%
Progressive Conservative	Robert Toupin	43,822	60.30	+51.19
Liberal	Joseph-Roland Comtois	19,040	26.20	-42.20
New Democratic	Brian Umansky	6,454	8.88	-4.04
Parti nationaliste	Jean-A. Bonin	3,060	4.21	
Commonwealth of Canada	Claude Brosseau	292	0.40	
Total valid votes		72,668	97.80	
Total rejected ballots		1,634	2.20	+0.82
Turnout		74,302	74.93	+7.98
Electors on the lists		99,162		
Progressive Conservative gain from Liberal		Swing		+46.70
Source: Report of the Chief Electoral Officer, Thirty-third General Election, 1984.

1980 Canadian federal election: Terrebonne
Party	Candidate	Votes	%	±%
Liberal	Joseph-Roland Comtois	36,089	68.40	+6.11
New Democratic	Gilles Bertrand	6,817	12.92	+7.35
Progressive Conservative	Jacques Dupuis	4,807	9.11	-1.34
Social Credit	Georgette Grenier	2,839	5.38	-12.93
Rhinoceros	Pédro Gervais G.D. Drapeau	1,844	3.50	+1.16
Union populaire	Réal Godin	233	0.44	-0.09
Marxist–Leninist	Jacques Coderre	131	0.25	-0.04
Total valid votes		52,760	98.62	
Total rejected ballots		738	1.38	
Turnout		53,498	66.95	
Eligible voters		79,910		
Liberal hold		Swing		-0.62
Source: Canadian Elections Database

1979 Canadian federal election: Terrebonne
Party	Candidate	Votes	%	±%
Liberal	Joseph-Roland Comtois	34,839	62.29	+7.22
Social Credit	Georgette Grenier	10,239	18.31	+14.01
Progressive Conservative	Louis-Rhéal Tremblay	5,845	10.45	-23.77
New Democratic	Roland Francis	3,114	5.57	+2.71
Rhinoceros	Jean-Marie Da Silva	1,306	2.34	
Union populaire	Réal Godin	298	0.53	
Marxist–Leninist	André Cousineau	164	0.29	
Communist	Gaétan Trudel	122	0.22	-0.42
Total valid votes		55,927	100.0	
Liberal hold		Swing		-3.40

Canadian federal by-election, 24 May 1977: Terrebonne
Party	Candidate	Votes	%	±%
On Mr. Comtois' resignation, 25 October 1976
Liberal	Joseph-Roland Comtois	25,006	55.1	-1.1
Progressive Conservative	Roger Delorme	15,539	34.2	+14.8
Social Credit	Jean Léveillé	1,949	4.3	-11.7
New Democratic	Pierre Demers	1,299	2.9	-4.6
Independent	Gilles Mélançon	1,151	2.5	
Communist	Claude Demers	290	0.6	+0.1
Independent	J. Noël St-Michel	167	0.4	
Total valid votes		45,401	100.0	

1974 Canadian federal election: Terrebonne
Party	Candidate	Votes	%	±%
Liberal	Joseph-Roland Comtois	28,652	56.1	+9.1
Progressive Conservative	Gilles Mélançon	9,897	19.4	-5.4
Social Credit	Guy Meunier	8,138	15.9	-4.6
New Democratic	Pierre Demers	3,812	7.5	-0.1
Marxist–Leninist	Françoise Daoust	272	0.5	
Communist	Nicole Ledoux	265	0.5	
Total valid votes		51,036	100.0	
lop.parl.ca

1972 Canadian federal election: Terrebonne
Party	Candidate	Votes	%	±%
Liberal	Joseph-Roland Comtois	24,928	47.1	-15.0
Social Credit	Guy Meunier	13,136	24.8	+20.8
Progressive Conservative	Michel Coté	10,885	20.5	+0.3
New Democratic	Pierre Demers	4,022	7.6	-3.7
Total valid votes		52,971	100.0	
Note: Social Credit vote is compared to Ralliement créditiste vote in the 1968 election.
Source: lop.parl.ca

1968 Canadian federal election: Terrebonne
Party	Candidate	Votes	%	±%
Liberal	Joseph-Roland Comtois	21,191	62.0	+17.8
Progressive Conservative	Jacques Vachon	6,934	20.3	-7.1
New Democratic	Jean-Maurice Sénécal	3,860	11.3	-2.9
Ralliement créditiste	Rosario Therrien	1,363	4.0	-10.2
Démocratisation Économique	Pierre Therrien	824	2.4	
Total valid votes		34,172	100.0	
