= Wilfrid Bruno Nantel =

Canadian politician

The Honourable Wilfrid Bruno Nantel PC
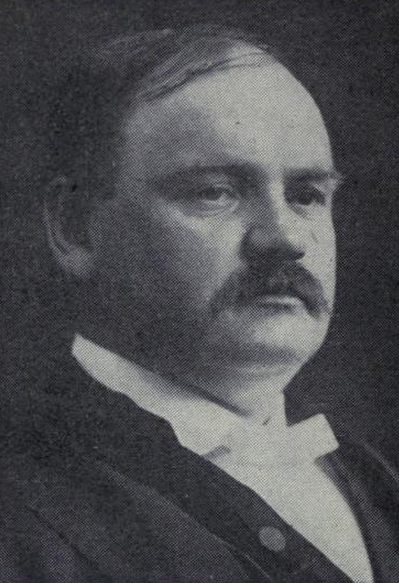

Member of the Canadian Parliament for Terrebonne
- In office 1908–1914
- Preceded by: Samuel Desjardins
- Succeeded by: Gédéon Rochon

Personal details
- Born: November 8, 1857 Saint-Jérôme, Canada East
- Died: May 22, 1940 (aged 82)
- Party: Conservative
- Relations: Guillaume-Alphonse Nantel, brother Antonin Nantel, brother
- Cabinet: Minister of Mines (1911–1912); Minister of Inland Revenue (1911–1914)

Wilfrid Bruno Nantel, PC (November 8, 1857 – May 22, 1940) was a Canadian politician.

== Career ==
Born in Saint-Jérôme, Canada East, the son of Guillaume Nantel and Adélaïde Desjardins, he was a lawyer before first running unsuccessfully for the House of Commons of Canada as a Conservative candidate in the Quebec riding of Terrebonne in the 1904 federal election. He was elected in the 1908 election and re-elected in the 1911 election. From 1911 to 1912, he was the Minister of Mines. From 1911 to 1914, he was the Minister of Inland Revenue. From 1914 to 1924, he was an Assistant Chief Commissioner of the Board of Railway Commissioners and Transport Commissioners.

His older brother, Guillaume-Alphonse Nantel, was also a politician.

== Notes ==
Political offices
Preceded by William Templeman	Minister of Mines; 1911–1912	Succeeded by Robert Rogers
