= Charmaine Borg =

Canadian politician (born 1990)

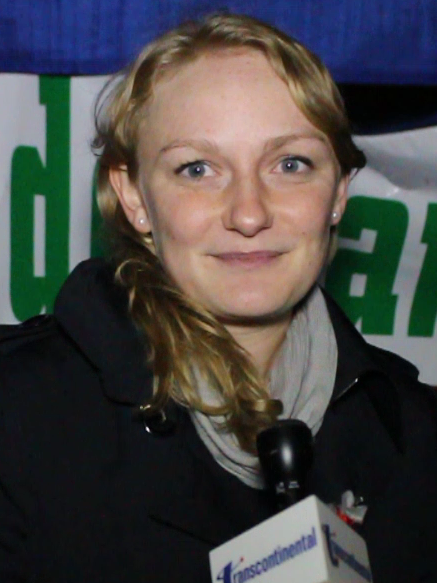
- Borg in 2011

Member of Parliament for Terrebonne—Blainville
- In office May 2, 2011 – October 19, 2015
- Preceded by: Diane Bourgeois
- Succeeded by: Michel Boudrias (Terrebonne)

Personal details
- Born: November 3, 1990 (age 36) Oakville, Ontario, Canada
- Party: New Democratic
- Profession: Community activist, labour relations officer, student, volunteer worker, politician

Charmaine Borg (born November 3, 1990) is a Canadian politician who served as the New Democratic Party (NDP) member of Parliament for the riding of Terrebonne—Blainville in Quebec from 2011 to 2015.

== Early years ==
Borg was born on November 3, 1990, in Oakville, Ontario as one of seven children, though her family moved to Keswick, Ontario when she was one year old. She is of Franco-Ontarian and Maltese descent, and is fully bilingual in French and English, though she preferred to speak French on the floor of the House of Commons.

After creating a drama program for at-risk youth, Borg won the Lieutenant Governor's Community Volunteer Award in 2008.

At the time of her election, Borg was a student studying political science and Latin American studies at McGill University and was also working as the Labour Relations Officer for the Association of McGill University Support Employees. She was also co-president of the student New Democratic Party club at McGill University.

== Entrance to politics ==
Borg was one of five current McGill students, alongside fellow undergraduates Mylène Freeman, Laurin Liu, and Matthew Dubé, and graduate student Jamie Nicholls, elected to Parliament in the federal 2011 election following the NDP's unexpected mid-campaign surge in Quebec. She defeated incumbent MP Diane Bourgeois of the Bloc Québécois by 49.3 percent to Bourgeois' 30.3 percent—a margin of over 10,600 votes. By comparison, the NDP had never finished higher than fourth since the riding was created in 1997, and only once had tallied the 10 percent required for their campaign expenses to be refunded.

She was the third-youngest member of the 41st Parliament, after Liu and Pierre-Luc Dusseault, and one of the youngest women ever elected to Parliament. The 2011 election marked the first time she had voted in a federal election.

Borg and Dubé were co-presidents of NDP McGill (the NDP student group at McGill University) at the time that they both won election to Parliament, and both had spent the campaign working to re-elect Thomas Mulcair in the nearby riding of Outremont. Borg had originally planned to spend the Fall 2011 term as a foreign exchange student in Mexico.

After her riding was split almost in half ahead of the 2015 federal election, Borg ran in Terrebonne, essentially the western half of her old riding. She was pushed into third place behind the BQ's Michel Boudrias and Liberal Michèle Audette amid the Bloc resurgence in the Laurentides.

== In Parliament ==
In Parliament, Borg was named to the Standing Committee on Justice and Human Rights, where she intervened against the Conservative government's omnibus crime bill, C-10, and the closure imposed on its debate, as well as Bill C-30, the Conservative bill on warrantless online surveillance. In the Fall of 2012, Borg embarked on a tour across Eastern Canada and the Maritimes to increase pressure on the Conservative government to abandon the bill. After months of public backlash, the Conservative government finally scrapped Bill C-30 in February 2013. Borg called the death of this bill a "great victory and a way forward for politics."

In the leadership race following the death of NDP leader Jack Layton, Borg endorsed Brian Topp.

On November 12, she was profiled by CPAC's Beyond Politics.

=== Katimavik ===
In 2012, Borg embarked on a cross-country tour to rally support for a Private Member's Motion she presented, M-352, to reinstate Federal funding to the recently cut Katimavik program.

==== Digital Issues ====
In April 2012, newly elected NDP leader Thomas Mulcair appointed Borg to the Shadow Cabinet of the Official Opposition. She was given the position of Digital Issues Critic, and became the youngest full critic in the history of Canada. Simultaneously, she was transferred from the Standing Committee on Justice and Human Rights to the Standing Committee on Ethics, Privacy and Access to Information. In one of her first acts as Digital Issues Critic, Borg launched at study at the Ethics, Privacy and Access to Information Committee to investigate the privacy practices of social media companies. During the study's hearings, MPs heard from numerous experts and industry representatives including Facebook, Twitter and Google.

==== Bill C-475 ====
Following through on the study into social media and privacy, Borg presented Bill C-475 to the House of Commons in February 2013. The bill seeks to amend the Personal Information Protection and Electronic Documents Act (PIPEDA) to introduce mandatory data breach reporting and enforcement powers to the Privacy Commissioner. Bill C-475 has received the endorsements of several privacy and internet experts, along with consumer protection and civil liberties groups.

A campaign called "My Privacy Online" was launched to support the progression of Bill C-475 through the House of Commons. The bill saw its first hour of debate at Second Reading on May 23, 2013, the same day that the Privacy Commissioner of Canada released a position paper calling for similar reforms to PIPEDA.

==== Bill C-486 ====
In response to calls from youth in her constituency of Terrebonne-Blainville, Borg collaborated with and seconded MP Paul Dewar's Bill C-486 in March 2013. Bill C-486 seeks to end the use of conflict minerals in Canada, particularly those originating in the Great Lakes region of Central Africa.

== Electoral record ==
2015 Canadian federal election: Terrebonne
Party	Candidate	Votes	%	±%	Expenditures
Bloc Québécois	Michel Boudrias	19,238	33.01	+2.23	$17,316.45
Liberal	Michèle Audette	16,316	27.99	+21.07	$28,471.60
New Democratic	Charmaine Borg	14,928	25.61	-25.93	$66,226.31
Conservative	Michel Surprenant	6,615	11.35	+3.28	$4,734.68
Green	Susan Moen	1,016	1.74	-0.95	–
Strength in Democracy	Louis Clément Sénat	171	0.29	–	$1,208.41
Total valid votes/expense limit		58,284	97.89		$222,232.39
Total rejected ballots		1,256	2.11	–	
Turnout		59,540	70.46	–	
Eligible voters		84,502			
Bloc Québécois gain from New Democratic		Swing		+14.08	
Source: Elections Canada

2011 Canadian federal election
Party	Candidate	Votes	%	±%	Expenditures
New Democratic	Charmaine Borg	28,236	49.4	+35.9%	0.00
Bloc Québécois	Diane Bourgeois	17,634	30.8	-21.5%	60,548.03
Conservative	Jean-Philippe Payment	5,222	9.1	-4.9%	21,165.08
Liberal	Robert Frégeau	4,885	8.5	-8%	19,287.41
Green	Michel Paulette	1,218	2.1	0%	37.24
