= Léo Cadieux =

Canadian politician (1908-2005)

The Honourable Léo Cadieux PC OC
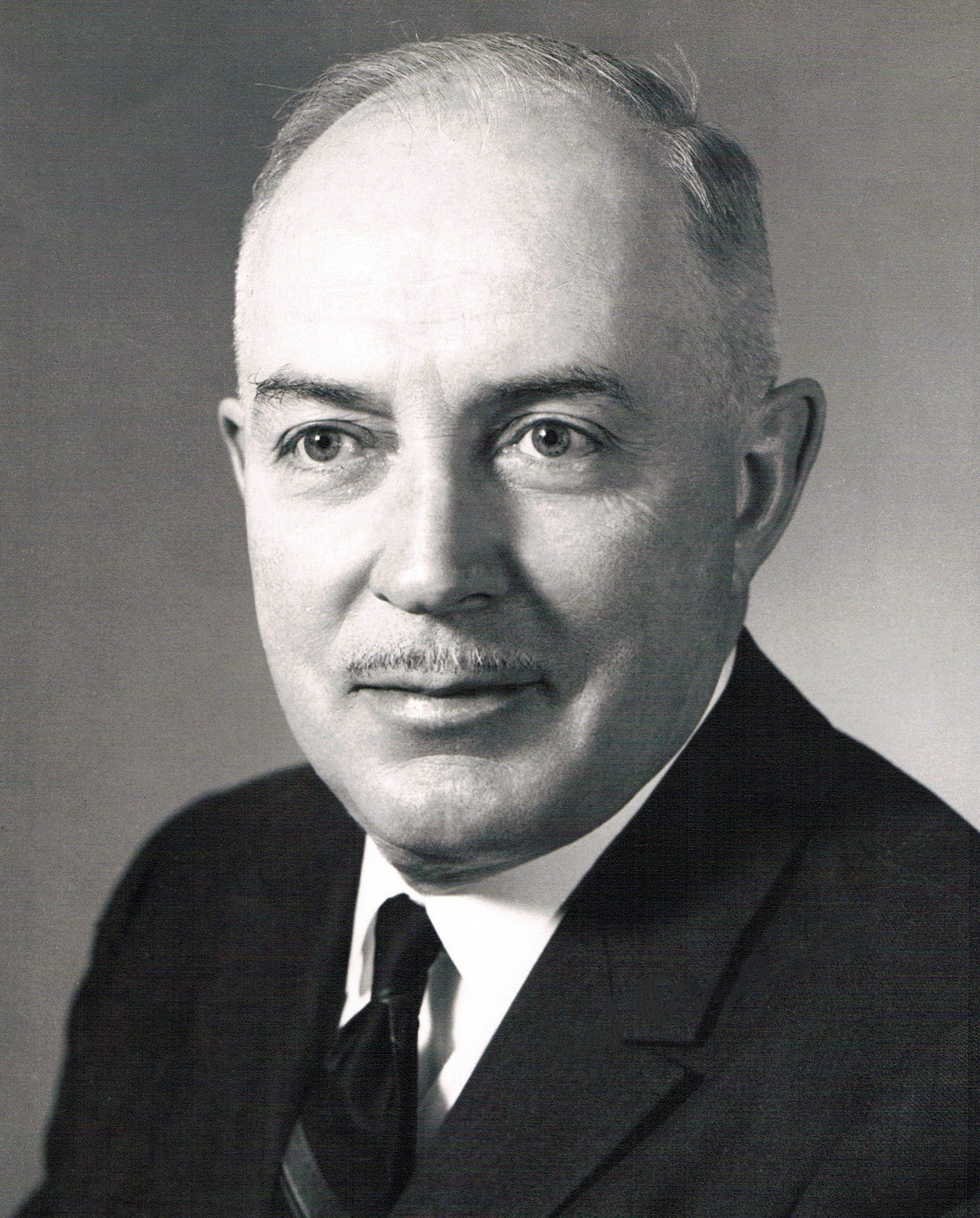
- Cadieux, c. 1968

Canadian Ambassador to France
- In office 16 October 1970 – 8 September 1975
- Prime Minister: Pierre Trudeau
- Preceded by: Paul André Beaulieu
- Succeeded by: Gérard Pelletier

Minister of National Defence
- In office 19 September 1967 – 16 September 1970
- Prime Minister: Lester B. Pearson; Pierre Trudeau
- Preceded by: Paul Hellyer
- Succeeded by: Charles Drury (acting)

Associate Minister of National Defence
- In office 15 February 1965 – 18 September 1967
- Prime Minister: Lester B. Pearson
- Preceded by: Lucien Cardin
- Succeeded by: Vacant

Member of Parliament for Labelle
- In office 25 June 1968 – 5 October 1970
- Preceded by: Gaston Clermont
- Succeeded by: Maurice Dupras

Member of Parliament for Terrebonne
- In office 18 June 1962 – 24 June 1968
- Preceded by: Marcel Deschambault
- Succeeded by: Joseph-Roland Comtois

Personal details
- Born: Joseph Alphonse Léo Cadieux; 28 May 1908 Saint-Jérôme, Quebec, Canada
- Died: 11 May 2005 (aged 96) Ottawa, Ontario, Canada
- Party: Liberal
- Spouse: Monique Plante (m. 1961)
- Children: 1

Léo Alphonse Joseph Cadieux PC (/kəˈdjuː/ kə-DEW, French: [kadjø]; May 28, 1908 – May 11, 2005) was a Canadian politician.

A newspaper journalist and publisher who was born in Saint-Jérôme, Quebec, Cadieux was first elected to the House of Commons of Canada as the Liberal Member of Parliament for Terrebonne, Quebec in the 1962 election.

In 1965, he was appointed to the Cabinet by Prime Minister Lester Pearson as Associate Minister of National Defence. In 1967, he was promoted to Minister of National Defence (and the first Francophone to hold the post), and remained in that position under Pearson and then Pierre Trudeau until he retired from politics in 1970.

On his retirement from Parliament, he was appointed Canada's Ambassador to France. He remained Canada's envoy until 1975.

During Cadieux's tenure as Defence Minister, Canada cut its troop commitment to Europe from 10,000 to 5,000 troops and ended Canada's commitment to send re-enforcements to the North Atlantic Treaty Organization's Central Front following a review of Canadian defence priorities. In Cabinet debates on Canada's attitude towards nuclear deterrence, Cadieux argued in support of the doctrine. He also oversaw the reorganization of the Canadian Emergency Measures Organization, Canada's civil defence agency.

In 1974, he was made an Officer of the Order of Canada.

== Electoral record ==
1965 Canadian federal election: Terrebonne
Party	Candidate	Votes	%	±%
Liberal	Léo Cadieux	16,806	44.2	-1.8
Progressive Conservative	André Fauteux	10,417	27.4	+15.8
Ralliement créditiste	Jean-Marc Fontaine	5,412	14.2	-18.7
New Democratic	Jean-Maurice Sénécal	5,384	14.2	+4.7
Total valid votes		38,019	100.0	

Note: Ralliement créditiste vote is compared to Social Credit vote in the 1963 election.

1963 Canadian federal election: Terrebonne
Party	Candidate	Votes	%	±%
Liberal	Léo Cadieux	19,015	46.0	+6.8
Social Credit	Hubert Murray	13,618	33.0	+9.6
Progressive Conservative	Bert Walker	4,798	11.6	-16.5
New Democratic	Gérard Gagnon	3,895	9.4	+0.1
Total valid votes		41,326	100.0	

1962 Canadian federal election: Terrebonne
Party	Candidate	Votes	%	±%
Liberal	Léo Cadieux	15,547	39.2	-9.4
Progressive Conservative	Marcel Deschambault	11,155	28.1	-23.3
Social Credit	Lucien Bachand	9,269	23.4	
New Democratic	Jean Philip	3,680	9.3	
Total valid votes		39,651	100.0	

Diplomatic posts
Preceded by Paul André Beaulieu	Ambassador Extraordinary and Plenipotentiary to France; 1970–1975	Succeeded by Hon. Gérard Pelletier
