= Raymond Préfontaine =

Canadian politician

The Honourable Raymond Préfontaine PC QC
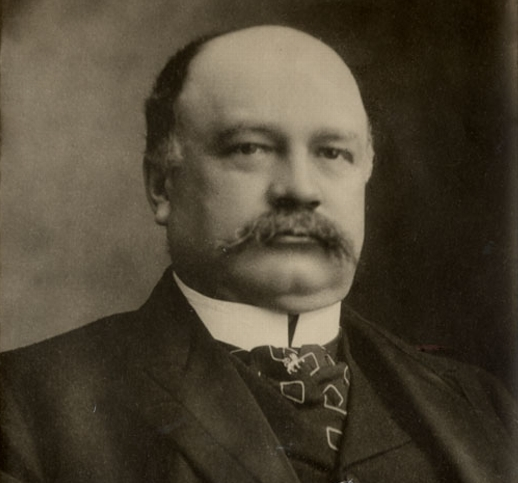

25th Mayor of Montreal
- In office 1898–1902
- Preceded by: Richard Wilson-Smith
- Succeeded by: James Cochrane

Personal details
- Born: 16 September 1850 Longueuil, Province of Canada
- Died: 25 December 1905 (aged 55) Paris, France
- Profession: lawyer

Joseph Raymond Fournier Préfontaine, PC QC (French pronunciation: [ʒozɛf ʁɛmɔ̃ fuʁnje pʁefɔ̃tɛn]; 16 September 1850 – 25 December 1905) was a Canadian politician. He was the Mayor of Montreal from 1898 to 1902, and sent Captain Joseph-Elzéar Bernier to explore the Arctic.

== Biography ==
Born in Longueuil, Quebec, he studied at the law faculty of McGill College, articled with Antoine-Aimé Dorion and Christophe-Alphonse Geoffrion, and was called to the bar in 1873. He was named a Queen's Counsel in 1899.

In 1875, he was elected to the Legislative Assembly of Quebec for the riding of Chambly. A Liberal, he was defeated in 1878. He was re-elected in an 1879 by-election, but was defeated again in 1881.

He was acclaimed to the House of Commons of Canada for the riding of Chambly in an 1886 by-election. A Liberal, he was re-elected in every election in one or another riding until dying in office in 1905. From 1902 to 1905, he was the Minister of Marine and Fisheries. When Joseph-Israel Tarte resigned from the Cabinet as Minister of Public Works in October 1902, Wilfrid Laurier, under pressure from Montréalers, gave Préfontaine the portfolio of Marine and Fisheries and, for the same reason, transferred to it from public works as "the major services relating to navigation."

The new minister, while maintaining his predecessor's policy, tackled his duties with dynamic energy. He approved experiments in winter navigation and a program for installing illuminated buoys in the channel of the St Lawrence. He appointed a commissioner to preside over all inquiries into marine disasters, in place of the harbour commissioners. He also investigated the possibility of creating an independent Canadian Navy. He sent Captain Joseph-Elzéar Bernier to explore the Arctic in order to strengthen Canada's rights in this region.

In 1905, he went to Great Britain and France, one of his goals being to promote a sea link between Marseilles and Montréal. He was in Paris when he was struck down by angina pectoris on 25 December. The French government held his funeral in the Église de La Madeleine in central Paris. A British battleship brought his remains back to Halifax for subsequent burial in Montréal.

From 1879 to 1883, he was the mayor of Hochelaga, after which the city was amalgamated with Montreal. From 1898 to 1902, he was the Mayor of Montreal.

Montréal's Préfontaine metro station, aréna Raymond-Préfontaine, parc Raymond-Préfontaine and rue Préfontaine are all named in his honour.

== Gallery ==
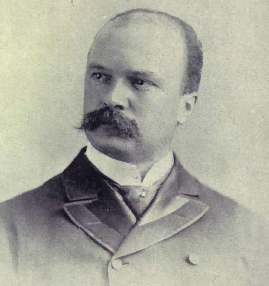

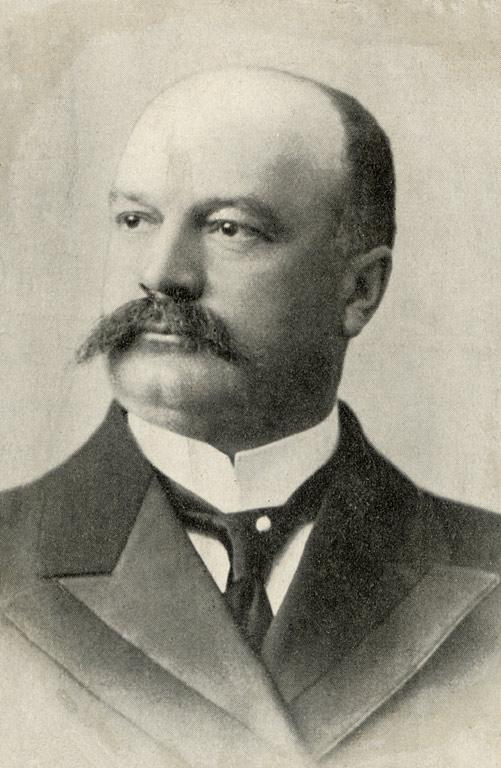

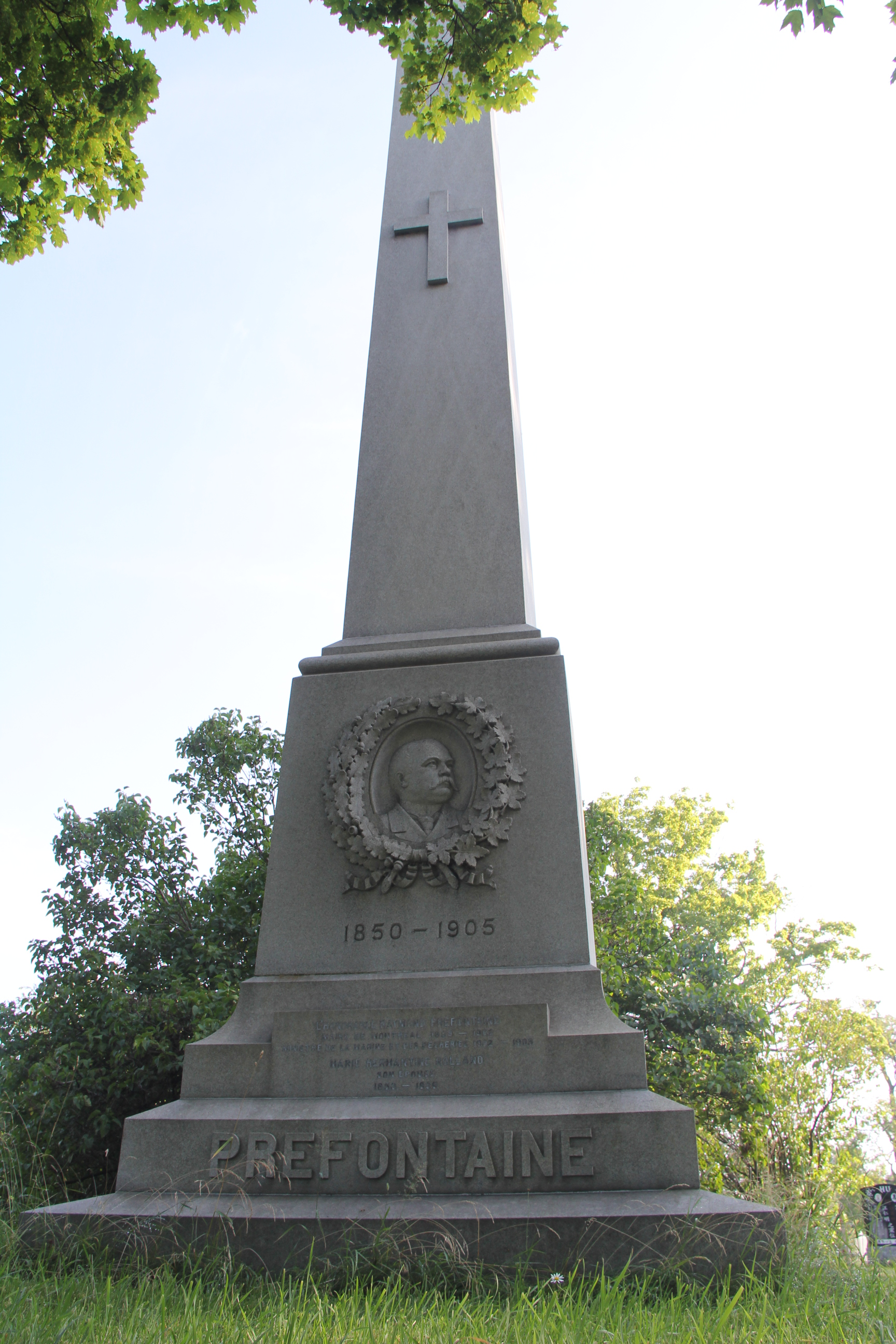

== Electoral record ==
1900 Canadian federal election: Terrebonne
Party	Candidate	Votes	%	±%
Liberal	Raymond Préfontaine	2,277	53.1	+4.9
Conservative	Léon-Adolphe Chauvin	2,010	46.9	-4.9
Total valid votes		4,287	100.0	

Legislative Assembly of Quebec
Preceded by Gédéon Larocque	Member of the Legislative Assembly for Chambly; 1871–1875	Succeeded by Michel-Dosithée-Stanislas Martel
Preceded by Michel-Dosithée-Stanislas Martel	Member of the Legislative Assembly for Chambly; 1879–1881	Succeeded by Michel-Dosithée-Stanislas Martel
Parliament of Canada
Preceded by Pierre-Basile Benoit	Member of Parliament for Chambly; 1886–1896	Succeeded by Christophe-Alphonse Geoffrion as MP for Chambly—Verchères
Preceded by Séverin Lachapelle as MP for Hochelaga	Member of Parliament for Maisonneuve; 1896–1905	Succeeded by Alphonse Verville
Preceded by Léon Adolphe Chauvin	Member of Parliament for Terrebonne; 1900–1902	Succeeded by Samuel Desjardins
