= Terrebonne—Blainville =

Former federal electoral district in Quebec, Canada

Coordinates: 45.75°N 73.73°W

Quebec electoral district
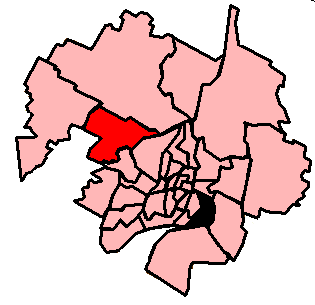
- 2003 boundaries

Defunct federal electoral district
- Legislature: House of Commons
- District created: 1996
- District abolished: 2012
- First contested: 1997
- Last contested: 2011
- District webpage: profile, map

Demographics
- Population (2011): 121,095
- Electors (2011): 83,300
- Area (km²): 220.13
- Census division(s): Thérèse-De Blainville, Les Moulins
- Census subdivision(s): Terrebonne, Blainville, Sainte-Anne-des-Plaines

Terrebonne—Blainville (French pronunciation: [tɛʁbɔn blɛ̃vil]) was a federal electoral district in Quebec, Canada, that was represented in the House of Commons of Canada from 1997 until 2015.

It was created in 1996 out of parts of Blainville—Deux-Montagnes, Repentigny and Joliette ridings.

The 2012 federal electoral boundaries redistribution saw the riding abolished into Terrebonne, Thérèse-De Blainville and Mirabel.

== Geography ==
The riding contains the towns of Blainville et Sainte-Anne-des-Plaines in the region of Laurentides, and the town of Terrebonne in Lanaudière.

The neighbouring ridings are Argenteuil—Papineau—Mirabel, Rivière-du-Nord, Montcalm, Alfred-Pellan, and Marc-Aurèle-Fortin.

== Members of Parliament ==
Parliament	Years	Member	Party
Terrebonne—Blainville; Riding created from Blainville—Deux-Montagnes, Terrebonne and Joliette
36th	1997–2000	Paul Mercier	Bloc Québécois
37th	2000–2004	Diane Bourgeois	Bloc Québécois
38th	2004–2006	Diane Bourgeois	Bloc Québécois
39th	2006–2008	Diane Bourgeois	Bloc Québécois
40th	2008–2011	Diane Bourgeois	Bloc Québécois
41st	2011–2015	Charmaine Borg	New Democratic
Riding dissolved into Terrebonne, Thérèse-De Blainville and Mirabel

== Election results, 1997–2015 ==
2011 Canadian federal election
Party	Candidate	Votes	%	±%	Expenditures
New Democratic	Charmaine Borg	28,260	49.3	+35.8	
Bloc Québécois	Diane Bourgeois	17,663	30.8	-21.8	
Conservative	Jean-Philippe Payment	5,236	9.1	-4.9	
Liberal	Robert Frégeau	4,893	8.5	-8.0	
Green	Michel Paulette	1,219	2.1	-1.1	
Total valid votes/expense limit		57,271	100.0		
Total rejected ballots		1,025	1.8	+0.1	
Turnout		58,296	65.9	-0.1	
Eligible voters		88,442	–	–	
New Democratic gain from Bloc Québécois		Swing		+28.8	

2008 Canadian federal election
Party	Candidate	Votes	%	±%	Expenditures
Bloc Québécois	Diane Bourgeois	28,303	52.3	-6.8	$62,243
Liberal	Eva Nassif	8,937	16.5	+7.6	$14,566
Conservative	Daniel Lebel	7,551	14.0	-6.0	$36,447
New Democratic	Michel Le Clair	7,278	13.5	+6.0	$2,256
Green	Martin Drapeau	1,714	3.2	-1.2	$806
Independent	M. Zamboni Cadieux	283	0.5	–	
Total valid votes/expense limit		54,066	100.0	$87,417	
Total rejected ballots		911	1.7	0.0	
Turnout		54,977	66.0	+3.7	

2006 Canadian federal election
Party	Candidate	Votes	%	±%	Expenditures
Bloc Québécois	Diane Bourgeois	30,197	59.2	-9.0	$42,306
Conservative	Daniel Lebel	10,212	20.0	+14.4	$15,696
Liberal	Maxime Thériault	4,576	9.0	-10.7	$8,126
New Democratic	Michel Leclair	3,829	7.5	+4.3	$1,211
Green	Martin Drapeau	2,216	4.3	+1.0	$291
Total valid votes/expense limit		51,030	100.0	$78,841	
Total rejected ballots		886	1.7	-1.0	
Turnout		51,916	62.3	+5.7	

2004 Canadian federal election
Party	Candidate	Votes	%	±%	Expenditures
Bloc Québécois	Diane Bourgeois	31,288	68.1	+16.2	$62,201
Liberal	Pierre Gingras	9,048	19.7	-12.0	$54,385
Conservative	Patrick Légaré	2,582	5.6	-6.6	$3,305
Green	Martin Drapeau	1,554	3.4	–	
New Democratic	Normand Beaudet	1,451	3.2	+1.2	
Total valid votes/expense limit		45,923	100.0	$75,469	
Total rejected ballots		1,252	2.7		
Turnout		47,175	56.6		

Note: Conservative vote is compared to the total of the Canadian Alliance vote and Progressive Conservative vote in 2000 election.

2000 Canadian federal election
Party	Candidate	Votes	%	±%
Bloc Québécois	Diane Bourgeois	28,933	51.9	+1.5
Liberal	François-Hugues Liberge	17,668	31.7	+5.3
Alliance	Guylaine St-Georges	3,741	6.7	
Progressive Conservative	Mélanie Gemme	3,089	5.5	-15.8
Natural Law	Pascale Levert	1,193	2.1	
New Democratic	Normand Beaudet	1,111	2.0	0.0
Total valid votes		55,735	100.0	

1997 Canadian federal election
Party	Candidate	Votes	%	±%
Bloc Québécois	Paul Mercier	28,066	50.4	-18.5
Liberal	Marcel Therrien	14,687	26.4	+8.5
Progressive Conservative	Dominic Dupuis	11,883	21.3	+9.7
New Democratic	Colette Bouchard	1,090	2.0	+0.9
Total valid votes		55,726	100.0	

== See also ==
- List of Canadian electoral districts
- Historical federal electoral districts of Canada
