= Guillaume-Alphonse Nantel =

Canadian politician (1852–1909)

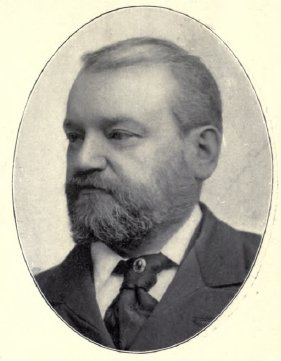

Member of the Canadian Parliament for Terrebonne
- In office June 20, 1882 – before August 16, 1882
- Preceded by: Louis-Rodrigue Masson
- Succeeded by: Joseph-Adolphe Chapleau

Member of the Legislative Assembly of Quebec for Terrebonne
- In office 1882–1900
- Preceded by: Joseph-Adolphe Chapleau
- Succeeded by: Jean Prévost

Personal details
- Born: November 4, 1852 Saint-Jérôme, Canada East
- Died: June 3, 1909 (aged 56) Montreal, Quebec
- Party: Conservative
- Other political affiliations: Conservative Party of Quebec
- Relations: Wilfrid Bruno Nantel, brother Antonin Nantel, brother

Guillaume-Alphonse Nantel (November 4, 1852 – June 3, 1909) was a Canadian lawyer, journalist, author, newspaper owner, and politician. Born in Saint-Jerome, Canada East, he was elected to the House of Commons of Canada as a Conservative candidate in the Quebec riding of Terrebonne in the 1882 federal election. He resigned less than two months later to allow Joseph-Adolphe Chapleau, the Secretary of State of Canada, to run for office.

In an August 1882 by-election, he was acclaimed to the Legislative Assembly of Quebec in the riding of Terrebonne. He was re-elected in 1886 and 1890. He was acclaimed again in 1892 and re-elected in 1897. He was the commissioner of public works in the cabinets of Charles-Eugène Boucher de Boucherville and Louis-Olivier Taillon. He was also the commissioner of crown lands in the cabinet of Edmund James Flynn. He was defeated in the 1900 elections.

He died in Montreal in 1909. His brother, Wilfrid Bruno Nantel, was also a politician.

1882 Canadian federal election: Terrebonne
Party	Candidate	Votes	%	±%
Conservative	Guillaume-Alphonse Nantel	1,593	65.6	-21.3
Unknown	A.E. Poirier	836	34.4	
Total valid votes		2,429	100.0	
