= Terrebonne (federal electoral district) =

Federal electoral district in Quebec, Canada

Quebec electoral district
- Interactive map of riding boundaries from the 2025 federal election

Federal electoral district
- Legislature: House of Commons
MP
Tatiana Auguste
Liberal
- District created: 1867
- First contested: 1867
- Last contested: 2026
- District webpage: profile, map

Demographics
- Population (2011): 106,322
- Electors (2015): 83,775
- Area (km²): 159
- Pop. density (per km²): 668.7
- Census division: Les Moulins
- Census subdivision: Terrebonne (part)

Terrebonne (French pronunciation: [tɛʁbɔn]) is a federal electoral district in the Canadian province of Quebec. It was represented in the House of Commons of Canada from 1867 to 1997, when it was dissolved in an electoral redistribution. It was reconstituted as an electoral district beginning with the 2015 election.

== History ==
The riding was originally created by the British North America Act 1867 which preserved existing electoral districts in Lower Canada. It was abolished in 1996 into Repentigny and Terrebonne—Blainville.

It was recreated during the 2012 federal electoral redistribution from parts of Terrebonne—Blainville (51%) and Montcalm (49%), and consisted solely of the city of Terrebonne. After the 2022 Canadian federal electoral redistribution, the southwestern corner of the city was transferred to Thérèse-De Blainville.

=== 2025 federal election ===
The riding drew headlines in the 2025 federal election, as it was initially called for the Bloc Québécois, but its recount led to Liberal candidate Tatiana Auguste winning by a margin of one vote, the narrowest result in the country. One voter in the district had her ballot returned as undeliverable due to an incorrect postal code printed on the pre-addressed ballot return envelope from Elections Canada; had her vote for the Bloc Québécois candidate been counted, the result would have been tied.

After Elections Canada stated that it did not have legal standing to overturn the judicial recount, the Bloc Québécois announced it would be asking the Superior Court of Quebec for a new by-election to be held. On October 27, the court ruled that a byelection would not be held. On November 3, Sinclair-Desgagné announced that she would be appealing the ruling to the Supreme Court of Canada.

On February 13, 2026, the Supreme Court annulled the result of the election in the riding, triggering a federal by-election. The by-election was held in April 2026, with Auguste winning by a margin of 731 votes, keeping the seat in Liberal control.

== Demographics ==
According to the 2021 Canadian census, 2023 representation order

Racial groups: 83.2% White, 10.4% Black, 2.5% Arab, 2.2% Latin American, 1.4% Indigenous
Languages: 87.3% French, 4.2% English, 2.3% Creole, 2.3% Spanish, 1.4% Arabic, 1.0% Italian
Religions: 68.9% Christian (57.9% Catholic, 11.0% Other), 4.2% Muslim, 26.1% None
Median income: $45,600 (2020)
Average income: $53,750 (2020)

== Members of Parliament ==
Parliament	Years	Member	Party
Terrebonne
1st	1867–1872	Louis-Rodrigue Masson	Conservative
2nd	1872–1874	Louis-Rodrigue Masson	Conservative
3rd	1874–1878	Louis-Rodrigue Masson	Conservative
4th	1878–1882	Louis-Rodrigue Masson	Conservative
5th	1882–1882	Guillaume-Alphonse Nantel	Conservative
5th	1882–1887	Joseph-Adolphe Chapleau	Conservative
6th	1887–1891	Joseph-Adolphe Chapleau	Conservative
7th	1891–1893	Joseph-Adolphe Chapleau	Conservative
7th	1893–1896	Pierre-Julien Leclair	Conservative
8th	1896–1900	Léon Adolphe Chauvin	Conservative
9th	1900–1903	Raymond Préfontaine	Liberal
9th	1903–1904	Samuel Desjardins	Liberal
10th	1904–1908	Samuel Desjardins	Liberal
11th	1908–1911	Wilfrid Bruno Nantel	Conservative
12th	1911–1915	Wilfrid Bruno Nantel	Conservative
12th	1915–1917	Gédéon Rochon	Conservative
13th	1917–1921	Jules-Édouard Prévost	Opposition (Laurier Liberals)
14th	1921–1925	Jules-Édouard Prévost	Liberal
15th	1925–1926	Jules-Édouard Prévost	Liberal
16th	1926–1930	Jules-Édouard Prévost	Liberal
17th	1930–1935	Louis-Étienne Parent	Liberal
18th	1935–1940	Louis-Étienne Parent	Liberal
19th	1940–1945	Lionel Bertrand	Independent Liberal
20th	1945–1949	Lionel Bertrand	Liberal
21st	1949–1953	Lionel Bertrand	Liberal
22nd	1953–1957	Lionel Bertrand	Liberal
23rd	1957–1958	Raymond Raymond	Liberal
24th	1958–1962	Marcel Deschambault	Progressive Conservative
25th	1962–1963	Léo Cadieux	Liberal
26th	1963–1965	Léo Cadieux	Liberal
27th	1965–1968	Léo Cadieux	Liberal
28th	1968–1972	Joseph-Roland Comtois	Liberal
29th	1972–1974	Joseph-Roland Comtois	Liberal
30th	1974–1979	Joseph-Roland Comtois	Liberal
31st	1979–1980	Joseph-Roland Comtois	Liberal
32nd	1980–1984	Joseph-Roland Comtois	Liberal
33rd	1984–1986	Robert Toupin	Progressive Conservative
33rd	1986–1986	Robert Toupin	Independent
33rd	1986–1987	Robert Toupin	New Democratic
33rd	1987–1988	Robert Toupin	Independent
34th	1988–1993	Jean-Marc Robitaille	Progressive Conservative
35th	1993–1997	Benoît Sauvageau	Bloc Québécois
Riding dissolved into Repentigny and Terrebonne—Blainville
Riding re-created from Terrebonne—Blainville and Montcalm
42nd	2015–2018	Michel Boudrias	Bloc Québécois
42nd	2018–2018	Michel Boudrias	Groupe parlementaire québécois
42nd	2018–2019	Michel Boudrias	Bloc Québécois
43rd	2019–2021	Michel Boudrias	Bloc Québécois
44th	2021–2025	Nathalie Sinclair-Desgagné	Bloc Québécois
45th	2025–2026	Tatiana Auguste	Liberal
45th	2026–present	Tatiana Auguste	Liberal

== Election results ==
=== Terrebonne, 2015–present ===
Graph of election results in Terrebonne (since 2011, minor parties that never got 2% of the vote or didn't run consistently are omitted)

==== 2026 Representation Order ====
Canadian federal by-election, April 13, 2026 2025 result annulled by Supreme Court
Party	Candidate	Votes	%	±%
Liberal	Tatiana Auguste	22,445	48.32	+9.59
Bloc Québécois	Nathalie Sinclair-Desgagné	21,777	46.89	+8.15
Conservative	Adrienne Charles	1,548	3.33	-14.85
New Democratic	Maxime Beaudoin	248	0.53	-2.05
Green	Benjamin Rankin	194	0.42	-0.63
People's	Maria Cantore	113	0.24	-0.47
Rhinoceros	Mark Moutter	61	0.13	–
Independent	Julie St-Amand	7	0.02	–
Independent	Nicolas Champagne	5	0.01	–
Independent	Geneviève Dorval	4	0.01	–
Independent	Myriam Beaulieu	3	0.01	–
No Affiliation	Sébastien CoRhino	3	0.01	–
Independent	Samuel Pignedoli	3	0.00	–
Independent	Myles René Laurent St. Pierre	3	0.01	–
Independent	Alex Banks	2	0.00	–
Independent	Sophia Bearden	2	0.00	–
Independent	Samuel Ducharme	2	0.00	–
Independent	Elizabeth Dupuis	2	0.00	–
Independent	Laurie Goble	2	0.00	–
Independent	Seyed Hosseini Lavasani	2	0.00	–
Independent	Ryan Huard	2	0.00	–
Independent	Krzysztof Krzywinski	2	0.00	–
Independent	Bryan Wang	2	0.00	–
Independent	Danica Boe	1	0.00	–
Independent	Jenny Cartwright	1	0.00	–
Independent	Jaël Champagne Gareau	1	0.00	–
Independent	Jayson Cowan	1	0.00	–
Independent	Michael Dyck	1	0.00	–
Independent	Anthony Hamel	1	0.00	–
Independent	Chris Kowalchuk	1	0.00	–
Independent	John Francis O'Flynn	1	0.00	–
Independent	Spencer Rocchi	1	0.00	–
Independent	Pascal St-Amand	1	0.00	–
Independent	Vivian Unger	1	0.00	–
Independent	Jeani Boudreault	0	0.00	–
Independent	Gerrit Dogger	0	0.00	–
Independent	Ysack Dupont	0	0.00	–
Independent	Alexandra Engering	0	0.00	–
Independent	Emily Goose	0	0.00	–
Independent	Kazimir Haykowsky	0	0.00	–
Independent	Jack Jean-Louis	0	0.00	–
Independent	Joseph Alain Matthew Laveault	0	0.00	–
Independent	Jocelyn LeBlanc-Courchaine	0	0.00	–
Independent	Lanna Palsson	0	0.00	–
Independent	Lajos Polya	0	0.00	–
Independent	Kayll Schaefer	0	0.00	–
Independent	Justin Steinburg	0	0.00	–
Independent	Alon Weinberg	0	0.00	–
Total valid votes/expense limit		46,443		
Total rejected ballots		371		
Turnout		46,814	51.25	-16.68
Eligible voters		91,344		
Liberal hold		Swing		+0.72
Source: Elections Canada

2025 Canadian federal election
Party	Candidate	Votes	%	±%	Expenditures
Liberal	Tatiana Auguste	23,352	38.741	+9.37	$29,829.08
Bloc Québécois	Nathalie Sinclair-Desgagné	23,351	38.739	−2.66	$48,740.91
Conservative	Adrienne Charles	10,961	18.18	+7.73	$7,308.70
New Democratic	Maxime Beaudoin	1,556	2.58	−4.07	$297.98
Green	Benjamin Rankin	630	1.05	−0.38	$0.00
People's	Maria Cantore	428	0.71	−1.97	$1,073.47
Total valid votes		60,278	98.63	+0.88	$135,341.20
Total rejected ballots		840	1.37	–0.88	
Turnout		61,118	67.93	+1.74	
Eligible voters		89,966			
Liberal notional gain from Bloc Québécois		Swing		+6.02	
Source: Elections Canada
Notes: Results were annulled by the Supreme Court of Canada on February 13, 2026. The results were also subject to an automatic judicial recount on May 7, 2025. The number of eligible voters does not include election day registrations.

2021 federal election redistributed results
Party	Vote	%
Bloc Québécois	23,298	41.40
Liberal	16,528	29.37
Conservative	5,886	10.46
Independent	3,762	6.68
New Democratic	3,742	6.65
People's	1,506	2.68
Green	802	1.43
Free	756	1.34
Total valid votes	56,280	97.75
Rejected ballots	1,296	2.25
Registered voters/ estimated turnout	86,986	66.19

==== 2013 Representation Order ====
2021 Canadian federal election
Party	Candidate	Votes	%	±%	Expenditures
Bloc Québécois	Nathalie Sinclair-Desgagné	24,270	41.17	-9.42	$28,625.35
Liberal	Eric Forget	17,475	29.64	+0.39	$6,336.80
Conservative	Frédérick Desjardins	6,183	10.49	+2.92	$8,029.08
New Democratic	Luke Mayba	3,913	6.64	-0.91	$7,745.37
Independent	Michel Boudrias	3,864	6.55	N/A	$16,574.97
People's	Louis Stinziani	1,594	2.70	+2.05	$0.00
Green	Dave Hamelin-Schuilenburg	847	1.44	-2.28	$103.94
Free	Nathan Fortin-Dubé	803	1.36	N/A	$25.71
Total valid votes/expense limit		58,949	97.75	–	$119,339.41
Total rejected ballots		1,355	2.25	+0.20	
Turnout		60,304	66.25	-4.06	
Eligible voters		91,028			
Bloc Québécois hold		Swing		-4.90	
Source: Elections Canada
Notes: The incumbent MP, Michel Boudrias, was not renominated as the candidate for the Bloc Quebecois, and subsequently ran as an Independent

2019 Canadian federal election
Party	Candidate	Votes	%	±%	Expenditures
Bloc Québécois	Michel Boudrias	31,029	50.59	+17.58	$20,129.32
Liberal	Frédéric Beauchemin	17,944	29.26	+1.26	none listed
Conservative	France Gagnon	4,640	7.57	-3.78	$1,869.33
New Democratic	Maxime Beaudoin	4,627	7.54	-18.07	$0.33
Green	Réjean Monette	2,277	3.71	+1.97	none listed
People's	Jeffrey Barnes	399	0.65		none listed
Rhinoceros	Paul Vézina	260	0.42		$0.00
Independent	Jade Hébert	159	0.26		$0.00
Total valid votes/expense limit		61,335	97.95		
Total rejected ballots		1,282	2.05	-0.06	
Turnout		62,617	70.31	-0.15	
Eligible voters		89,062			
Bloc Québécois hold		Swing		+8.16	
Source: Elections Canada

2015 Canadian federal election
Party	Candidate	Votes	%	±%	Expenditures
Bloc Québécois	Michel Boudrias	19,238	33.01	+2.23	$17,316.45
Liberal	Michèle Audette	16,316	27.99	+21.07	$28,471.60
New Democratic	Charmaine Borg	14,928	25.61	-25.93	$66,226.31
Conservative	Michel Surprenant	6,615	11.35	+3.28	$4,734.68
Green	Susan Moen	1,016	1.74	-0.95	–
Strength in Democracy	Louis Clément Sénat	171	0.29	–	$1,208.41
Total valid votes/expense limit		58,284	97.89		$222,232.39
Total rejected ballots		1,256	2.11	–	
Turnout		59,540	70.46	–	
Eligible voters		84,502			
Bloc Québécois gain from New Democratic		Swing		+14.08	
Source: Elections Canada

2011 federal election redistributed results
Party	Vote	%
New Democratic	25,625	51.54
Bloc Québécois	15,304	30.78
Conservative	4,011	8.07
Liberal	3,440	6.92
Green	1,339	2.69

=== Terrebonne, 1867–1997 ===
Graph of election results in Terrebonne (1957-1993, minor parties that never got 2% of the vote or didn't run consistently are omitted)

1993 Canadian federal election
Party	Candidate	Votes	%	±%
Bloc Québécois	Benoît Sauvageau	58,030	68.87	
Liberal	Claire Brouillet	15,102	17.92	-0.62
Progressive Conservative	Jean-Marc Robitaille	9,825	11.66	-41.09
New Democratic	Renée-Claude Lorimier	900	1.07	-9.67
Commonwealth of Canada	Christian Chouery	403	0.48	
Total valid votes		84,260	95.50	
Total rejected ballots		3,973	4.50	+2.09
Turnout		88,233	79.12	+5.29
Eligible voters		111,511		
Bloc Québécois gain from Progressive Conservative		Swing		+54.98
Source: Canadian Elections Database

1988 Canadian federal election
Party	Candidate	Votes	%	±%
Progressive Conservative	Jean-Marc Robitaille	35,345	52.76	-7.55
Liberal	Claire Brouillet	12,422	18.54	-7.66
Independent	Robert Toupin	10,390	15.51	
New Democratic	Lauraine Vaillancourt	7,194	10.74	+1.86
Rhinoceros	Alain Cowboy De Lagrave	1,647	2.46	
Total valid votes		66,998	97.59	
Total rejected ballots		1,655	2.41	+0.21
Turnout		68,653	73.84	-1.09
Eligible voters		68,653		
Progressive Conservative hold		Swing		+0.06
Source: Elections Canada

1984 Canadian federal election
Party	Candidate	Votes	%	±%
Progressive Conservative	Robert Toupin	43,822	60.30	+51.19
Liberal	Joseph-Roland Comtois	19,040	26.20	-42.20
New Democratic	Brian Umansky	6,454	8.88	-4.04
Parti nationaliste	Jean-A. Bonin	3,060	4.21	
Commonwealth of Canada	Claude Brosseau	292	0.40	
Total valid votes		72,668	97.80	
Total rejected ballots		1,634	2.20	+0.82
Turnout		74,302	74.93	+7.98
Electors on the lists		99,162		
Progressive Conservative gain from Liberal		Swing		+46.70
Source: Report of the Chief Electoral Officer, Thirty-third General Election, 1984.

1980 Canadian federal election
Party	Candidate	Votes	%	±%
Liberal	Joseph-Roland Comtois	36,089	68.40	+6.11
New Democratic	Gilles Bertrand	6,817	12.92	+7.35
Progressive Conservative	Jacques Dupuis	4,807	9.11	-1.34
Social Credit	Georgette Grenier	2,839	5.38	-12.93
Rhinoceros	Pédro Gervais G.D. Drapeau	1,844	3.50	+1.16
Union populaire	Réal Godin	233	0.44	-0.09
Marxist–Leninist	Jacques Coderre	131	0.25	-0.04
Total valid votes		52,760	98.62	
Total rejected ballots		738	1.38	
Turnout		53,498	66.95	
Eligible voters		79,910		
Liberal hold		Swing		-0.62
Source: Canadian Elections Database

1979 Canadian federal election
Party	Candidate	Votes	%	±%
Liberal	Joseph-Roland Comtois	34,839	62.29	+7.22
Social Credit	Georgette Grenier	10,239	18.31	+14.01
Progressive Conservative	Louis-Rhéal Tremblay	5,845	10.45	-23.77
New Democratic	Roland Francis	3,114	5.57	+2.71
Rhinoceros	Jean-Marie Da Silva	1,306	2.34	
Union populaire	Réal Godin	298	0.53	
Marxist–Leninist	André Cousineau	164	0.29	
Communist	Gaétan Trudel	122	0.22	-0.42
Total valid votes		55,927	100.0	
Liberal hold		Swing		-3.40

Canadian federal by-election, 24 May 1977
Party	Candidate	Votes	%	±%
On Mr. Comtois' resignation, 25 October 1976
Liberal	Joseph-Roland Comtois	25,006	55.1	-1.1
Progressive Conservative	Roger Delorme	15,539	34.2	+14.8
Social Credit	Jean Léveillé	1,949	4.3	-11.7
New Democratic	Pierre Demers	1,299	2.9	-4.6
Independent	Gilles Mélançon	1,151	2.5	
Communist	Claude Demers	290	0.6	+0.1
Independent	J. Noël St-Michel	167	0.4	
Total valid votes		45,401	100.0	

1974 Canadian federal election
Party	Candidate	Votes	%	±%
Liberal	Joseph-Roland Comtois	28,652	56.1	+9.1
Progressive Conservative	Gilles Mélançon	9,897	19.4	-5.4
Social Credit	Guy Meunier	8,138	15.9	-4.6
New Democratic	Pierre Demers	3,812	7.5	-0.1
Marxist–Leninist	Françoise Daoust	272	0.5	
Communist	Nicole Ledoux	265	0.5	
Total valid votes		51,036	100.0	
lop.parl.ca

1972 Canadian federal election
Party	Candidate	Votes	%	±%
Liberal	Joseph-Roland Comtois	24,928	47.1	-15.0
Social Credit	Guy Meunier	13,136	24.8	+20.8
Progressive Conservative	Michel Coté	10,885	20.5	+0.3
New Democratic	Pierre Demers	4,022	7.6	-3.7
Total valid votes		52,971	100.0	
Note: Social Credit vote is compared to Ralliement créditiste vote in the 1968 election.
Source: lop.parl.ca

1968 Canadian federal election
Party	Candidate	Votes	%	±%
Liberal	Joseph-Roland Comtois	21,191	62.0	+17.8
Progressive Conservative	Jacques Vachon	6,934	20.3	-7.1
New Democratic	Jean-Maurice Sénécal	3,860	11.3	-2.9
Ralliement créditiste	Rosario Therrien	1,363	4.0	-10.2
Démocratisation Économique	Pierre Therrien	824	2.4	
Total valid votes		34,172	100.0	

1965 Canadian federal election
Party	Candidate	Votes	%	±%
Liberal	Léo Cadieux	16,806	44.2	-1.8
Progressive Conservative	André Fauteux	10,417	27.4	+15.8
Ralliement créditiste	Jean-Marc Fontaine	5,412	14.2	-18.7
New Democratic	Jean-Maurice Sénécal	5,384	14.2	+4.7
Total valid votes		38,019	100.0	

Note: Ralliement créditiste vote is compared to Social Credit vote in the 1963 election.

1963 Canadian federal election
Party	Candidate	Votes	%	±%
Liberal	Léo Cadieux	19,015	46.0	+6.8
Social Credit	Hubert Murray	13,618	33.0	+9.6
Progressive Conservative	Bert Walker	4,798	11.6	-16.5
New Democratic	Gérard Gagnon	3,895	9.4	+0.1
Total valid votes		41,326	100.0	

1962 Canadian federal election
Party	Candidate	Votes	%	±%
Liberal	Léo Cadieux	15,547	39.2	-9.4
Progressive Conservative	Marcel Deschambault	11,155	28.1	-23.3
Social Credit	Lucien Bachand	9,269	23.4	
New Democratic	Jean Philip	3,680	9.3	
Total valid votes		39,651	100.0	

1958 Canadian federal election
Party	Candidate	Votes	%	±%
Progressive Conservative	Marcel Deschambault	19,319	51.4	+11.5
Liberal	Raymond Raymond	18,241	48.6	-11.5
Total valid votes		37,560	100.0	

1957 Canadian federal election
Party	Candidate	Votes	%
Liberal	Raymond Raymond	19,515	60.1
Progressive Conservative	Marcel Deschambault	12,973	39.9
Total valid votes		32,488	100.0

1953 Canadian federal election
Party	Candidate	Votes
Liberal	Lionel Bertrand	acclaimed

1949 Canadian federal election
Party	Candidate	Votes	%	±%
Liberal	Lionel Bertrand	18,304	66.9	+0.2
Progressive Conservative	Lucien Thinel	8,107	29.6	
Union des électeurs	Jean-Paul Houle	953	3.5	
Total valid votes		27,364	100.0	

1945 Canadian federal election
Party	Candidate	Votes	%	±%
Liberal	Lionel Bertrand	15,383	66.6	+26.9
Bloc populaire	Henri Dionne	6,726	29.1	
Independent	Charles Aubry	691	3.0	
Co-operative Commonwealth	Louis-Philippe Lebel	281	1.2	
Total valid votes		23,081	100.0	

1940 Canadian federal election
Party	Candidate	Votes	%	±%
Independent Liberal	Lionel Bertrand	7,839	44.9	
Liberal	Louis-Étienne Parent	6,938	39.8	-25.3
National Government	Léopold Lachapelle	2,668	15.3	-11.9
Total valid votes		17,445	100.0	

Note: "National Government" vote is compared to Conservative vote in 1935 election.

1935 Canadian federal election
Party	Candidate	Votes	%	±%
Liberal	Louis-Étienne Parent	9,900	65.1	+8.9
Conservative	Léopold Nantel	4,141	27.2	-16.6
Liberal	Eugène Léveillé	1,172	7.7	
Total valid votes		15,213	100.0	

1930 Canadian federal election
Party	Candidate	Votes	%	±%
Liberal	Louis-Étienne Parent	8,609	56.1	-19.5
Conservative	Guillaume-André Fauteux	6,727	43.9	+19.5
Total valid votes		15,336	100.0	

1926 Canadian federal election
Party	Candidate	Votes	%	±%
Liberal	Jules-Édouard Prévost	7,060	75.7	+3.4
Conservative	Léopold Nantel	2,270	24.3	-3.4
Total valid votes		9,330	100.0	

1925 Canadian federal election
Party	Candidate	Votes	%	±%
Liberal	Jules-Édouard Prévost	6,789	72.2	+1.3
Conservative	Léopold Nantel	2,609	27.8	-1.3
Total valid votes		9,398	100.0	

1921 Canadian federal election
Party	Candidate	Votes	%
Liberal	Jules-Édouard Prévost	8,882	71.0
Conservative	Guillaume-André Fauteux	3,636	29.0
Total valid votes		12,518	100.0

1917 Canadian federal election
Party	Candidate	Votes
Opposition (Laurier Liberals)	Jules-Édouard Prévost	acclaimed

Canadian federal by-election, 8 February 1915
Party	Candidate	Votes	%
Conservative	Gédéon Rochon	2,193	53.6
Unknown	Joseph-Alphonse Beaulieu	1,895	46.4
Total valid votes		4,088	100.0
Called upon Mr. Nantel being appointed Railway Commissioner, 20 October 1914.

By-election on 27 October 1911 On Mr. Nantel being appointed Minister of Inland Revenue, 10 October 1911
Party	Candidate	Votes
Conservative	Wilfrid-Bruno Nantel	acclaimed

1911 Canadian federal election
Party	Candidate	Votes	%	±%
Conservative	Wilfrid Bruno Nantel	2,727	56.5	+5.7
Liberal	Samuel Desjardins	2,101	43.5	-5.7
Total valid votes		4,828	100.0	

1908 Canadian federal election
Party	Candidate	Votes	%	±%
Conservative	Wilfrid Bruno Nantel	2,592	50.8	+2.7
Liberal	Thibaudeau Rinfret	2,513	49.2	-2.7
Total valid votes		5,105	100.0	

1904 Canadian federal election
Party	Candidate	Votes	%	±%
Liberal	Samuel Desjardins	2,481	51.9	-1.5
Conservative	W. Bruno Nantel	2,297	48.1	+1.5
Total valid votes		4,778	100.0	

Canadian federal by-election, 24 February 1903
Party	Candidate	Votes	%	±%
Préfontaine was appointed Minister of Marine and Fisheries, 11 November 1902
Liberal	Samuel Desjardins	2,325	53.4	+0.3
Conservative	A.H. Masson	2,029	46.6	-0.3
Total valid votes		4,354	100.0	

1900 Canadian federal election
Party	Candidate	Votes	%	±%
Liberal	Raymond Préfontaine	2,277	53.1	+4.9
Conservative	Léon-Adolphe Chauvin	2,010	46.9	-4.9
Total valid votes		4,287	100.0	

1896 Canadian federal election
Party	Candidate	Votes	%	±%
Conservative	Léon-Adolphe Chauvin	1,862	51.8	-10.1
Liberal	P.F.C. Petit	1,734	48.2	+10.1
Total valid votes		3,596	100.0	

Note: popular vote is compared to vote in 1891 general election.

By-election on 10 January 1893 Chapleau was appointed Lieutenant-Governor of Quebec, 7 December 1892
Party	Candidate	Votes
Conservative	Pierre Leclaire	acclaimed

1891 Canadian federal election
Party	Candidate	Votes	%	±%
Conservative	Joseph-Adolphe Chapleau	1,830	61.9	-1.8
Liberal	M.D. Limoges	1,126	38.1	+1.8
Total valid votes		2,956	100.0	

1887 Canadian federal election
Party	Candidate	Votes	%	±%
Conservative	Joseph-Adolphe Chapleau	1,819	63.8	-1.8
Liberal	M.J. Therrien	1,034	36.2	
Total valid votes		2,853	100.0	

By-election on 16 August 1882 To allow Mr. Chapleau to run for office.
Party	Candidate	Votes
Conservative	Joseph-Adolphe Chapleau	acclaimed

Note: popular vote is compared to vote in 1882 general election.

1882 Canadian federal election
Party	Candidate	Votes	%	±%
Conservative	Guillaume-Alphonse Nantel	1,593	65.6	-21.3
Unknown	A.E. Poirier	836	34.4	
Total valid votes		2,429	100.0	

Note: popular vote is compared to vote in 1878 general election.

By-election on 6 November 1878 Masson was appointed Minister of Militia and Defence, 19 October 1878
Party	Candidate	Votes
Conservative	Louis-Rodrigue Masson	acclaimed

1878 Canadian federal election
Party	Candidate	Votes	%
Conservative	Louis-Rodrigue Masson	1,194	86.8
Unknown	B. Longpré A	181	13.2
Total valid votes		1,375	100.0

1874 Canadian federal election
Party	Candidate	Votes
Conservative	Louis-Rodrigue Masson	acclaimed
Source: lop.parl.ca

1872 Canadian federal election
Party	Candidate	Votes
Conservative	Louis-Rodrigue Masson	acclaimed
Source: Canadian Elections Database

1867 Canadian federal election
Party	Candidate	Votes
Conservative	Louis-Rodrigue Masson	acclaimed
Source: Canadian Elections Database

== See also ==
- List of Canadian electoral districts
- Historical federal electoral districts of Canada
