= Léon Adolphe Chauvin =

Canadian politician (1861–1904)

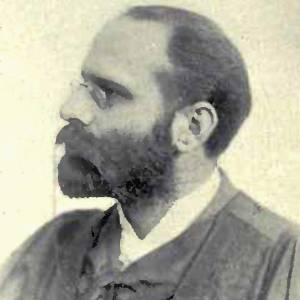
Léon Adolphe Chauvin

Léon Adolphe Chauvin (20 July 1861 – 8 June 1904) was a lawyer and political figure in Quebec, Canada. Chauvin represented Terrebonne in the House of Commons of Canada from 1896 to 1900 as a Conservative.

He was born in Terrebonne, Canada East and was educated at the Collège de Montréal. In 1889, he married Berthe Gagnon. Chauvin was chief census officer for the province of Quebec in 1891. He was defeated by Raymond Préfontaine when he ran for reelection to the House of Commons in 1900.

== Electoral record ==
1900 Canadian federal election: Terrebonne
Party	Candidate	Votes	%	±%
Liberal	Raymond Préfontaine	2,277	53.1	+4.9
Conservative	Léon-Adolphe Chauvin	2,010	46.9	-4.9
Total valid votes		4,287	100.0	

1896 Canadian federal election: Terrebonne
Party	Candidate	Votes	%	±%
Conservative	Léon-Adolphe Chauvin	1,862	51.8	-10.1
Liberal	P.F.C. Petit	1,734	48.2	+10.1
Total valid votes		3,596	100.0	

Note: popular vote is compared to vote in 1891 general election.
