= Joseph-Octave Latour =

Canadian politician (1906–1975)

Member of Parliament for Argenteuil—Deux-Montagnes
- In office March 1958 – June 1962
- Preceded by: Philippe Valois
- Succeeded by: Vincent Drouin

Personal details
- Born: 11 February 1906 Saint-Jérôme, Quebec
- Died: 22 May 1975 (aged 69)
- Party: Progressive Conservative
- Spouse(s): Fernande Vermette m. 2 December 1933
- Profession: Notary

Joseph-Octave Latour (11 February 1906 – 22 May 1975) was a Progressive Conservative party member of the House of Commons of Canada. He was a notary by profession.

Latour was born in Saint-Jérôme, Quebec, and attended Saint-Jérôme Collegiate, Sainte-Thérèse Seminary, and the Université de Montréal, where he obtained a Bachelor of Arts degree.

Between 1945 and 1958, he served as the registrar for Deux-Montagnes County.

After an unsuccessful campaign at the Argenteuil—Deux-Montagnes riding during the 1957 election, he was elected in the 1958 election. After serving one term, the 24th Canadian Parliament, Latour lost his seat in the 1962 election to Vincent Drouin of the Liberal party.
