= Blainville (provincial electoral district) =

Provincial electoral district in Quebec, Canada

Quebec electoral district
- Location in Thérèse-De Blainville
- Coordinates: 45.710°N 73.841°W

Provincial electoral district
- Legislature: National Assembly of Quebec
MNA
Nadine Le Gal
Parti Québécois
- District created: 1992
- First contested: 1994
- Last contested: 2026

Demographics
- Population (2006): 77,490
- Electors (2012): 57,320
- Area (km²): 157.7
- Pop. density (per km²): 491.4
- Census division: Thérèse-De Blainville (part)
- Census subdivision(s): Blainville, Bois-des-Filion, Lorraine

Blainville (French pronunciation: [blɛ̃vil]) is a provincial electoral district in the Laurentides region of Quebec, Canada, which elects a member to the National Assembly of Quebec. It contains the city of Blainville and two other smaller municipalities: Bois-des-Filion and Lorraine.

It was created for the 1994 election from Groulx and Terrebonne electoral districts.

In the change from the 2001 to the 2011 electoral map, it lost a part of the city of Blainville to Groulx electoral district; previously, the entire city was within Blainville electoral district.

In the change from the 2011 to 2017 electoral map, the riding lost Sainte-Anne-des-Plaines to the new riding of Les Plaines and gained the Saint-Rédempteur neighbourhood of Blainville from Groulx.

== Members of the National Assembly ==
Legislature	Years	Member	Party
Riding created from Groulx and Terrebonne
35th	1994–1998	Céline Signori	Parti Québécois
36th	1998–2001	Céline Signori	Parti Québécois
36th	2001–2003	Richard Legendre	Parti Québécois
37th	2003–2007	Richard Legendre	Parti Québécois
38th	2007–2008	Pierre Gingras	Action démocratique
39th	2008–2011	Daniel Ratthé	Parti Québécois
39th	2011–2011	Daniel Ratthé	Independent
39th	2011–2012	Daniel Ratthé	Coalition Avenir Québec
40th	2012–2013	Daniel Ratthé	Coalition Avenir Québec
40th	2013–2014	Daniel Ratthé	Independent
41st	2014–2018	Mario Laframboise	Coalition Avenir Québec
42nd	2018–2022	Mario Laframboise	Coalition Avenir Québec
43rd	2022–2026	Mario Laframboise	Coalition Avenir Québec
44th	2026–Present	Nadine Le Gal	Parti Québécois

== Election results ==
2026 Quebec general election
** Preliminary results — Not yet official **
Party	Candidate	Votes	%	±%
Parti Québécois	Nadine Le Gal	15,000	33.69	+18.26
Liberal	Sébastien Daoust	11,822	26.55	+15.52
Conservative	Pascal Quevillon	7,112	15.97	+6.21
Coalition Avenir Québec	Mario Laframboise	6,418	14.42	–35.03
Québec solidaire	Louis Piette	3,448	7.74	–6.26
Climat Québec	Marie-Claude Archambault	723	1.62	N/A
Total valid votes		44,523	98.49	–0.12
Total rejected ballots		682	1.51	+0.12
Turnout		45,205	72.36	+0.24
Electors on the lists		62,470		
Parti Québécois gain from Coalition Avenir Québec		Swing		+1.37
Source: Élections Québec

2022 Quebec general election
Party	Candidate	Votes	%	±%
Coalition Avenir Québec	Mario Laframboise	21,149	49.45	+1.18
Parti Québécois	Frédéric Labelle	6,600	15.43	+1.88
Québec solidaire	Éric Michaud	5,987	14.00	-1.12
Liberal	Alexandre Mercho	4,718	11.03	-8.04
Conservative	Grace Daou	4,175	9.76	–
Démocratie directe	Marie-France Hanna	140	0.33	–
Total valid votes		42,769	98.61	–
Total rejected ballots		601	1.39	-0.38
Turnout		43,370	72.12	-2.44
Electors on the lists		60,137	–	–
Coalition Avenir Québec hold		Swing		-0.35

2018 Quebec general election
Party	Candidate	Votes	%	±%
Coalition Avenir Québec	Mario Laframboise	20,457	48.27	+14.35
Liberal	Lucia Carvalho	8,082	19.07	-10.44
Québec solidaire	William Lepage	6,408	15.12	+8.6
Parti Québécois	Gabriel Gousse	5,744	13.55	-15.98
Green	Valérie Fortier	1,146	2.7	
New Democratic	Thierry Gervais	286	0.67	
Citoyens au pouvoir	Jean Bastien	254	0.6	
Total valid votes		42,377	98.24	
Total rejected ballots		761	1.76	
Turnout		43,138	74.56	
Eligible voters		57,856		
Coalition Avenir Québec hold		Swing		+12.40
Source(s) "Rapport des résultats officiels du scrutin". Élections Québec.

2014 Quebec general election
Party	Candidate	Votes	%	±%
Coalition Avenir Québec	Mario Laframboise	15,075	33.92	-7.41
Liberal	Marie-Claude Collin	13,118	29.51	+13.66
Parti Québécois	Gyslaine Desrosiers	13,046	29.53	-6.17
Québec solidaire	Annie Giguère	2,898	6.52	+2.63
Équipe Autonomiste	Jean Philippe Fournier	312	0.70	-
Total valid votes		44,449	98.08	
Total rejected, unmarked and declined ballots		868	1.92	+0.86
Turnout		45,317	76.85	-5.01
Eligible voters		58,968		
Coalition Avenir Québec hold		Swing		-10.53

2012 Quebec general election
Party	Candidate	Votes	%
Coalition Avenir Québec	Daniel Ratthé	19,288	41.32
Parti Québécois	Bernard Généreux	16,579	35.52
Liberal	Joao Neves	7,401	15.86
Québec solidaire	Étienne Ferland	1,817	3.89
Option nationale	Christian Bélanger	749	1.61
Green	Michel Sigouin	701	1.50
Independent	Yan Bégin	141	0.30
Total valid votes		46,676	98.94
Total rejected, unmarked and declined ballots		498	1.06
Turnout		47,174	81.86
Eligible voters		57,627	
Coalition Avenir Québec gain		Swing	

2008 Quebec general election
Party	Candidate	Votes	%
Parti Québécois	Daniel Ratthé	13,989	40.52
Liberal	Johanne Berthiaume	11,217	32.49
Action démocratique	Pierre Gingras	7,571	21.93
Green	Michel Sigouin	954	2.76
Québec solidaire	Francis Gagnon-Bergmann	789	2.29

2007 Quebec general election
Party	Candidate	Votes	%
Action démocratique	Pierre Gingras	17,731	41.84
Parti Québécois	Richard Legendre	14,184	33.47
Liberal	Roberto Rego	8,109	19.13
Green	Geoffroy Chartrand	1,549	3.65
Québec solidaire	Francis Gagnon-Bergmann	810	1.91

2003 Quebec general election
Party	Candidate	Votes	%	±%
Parti Québécois	Richard Legendre	15,288	42.73	-3.52
Liberal	Jocelyne Roch	1,2689	35.47	-4.81
Action démocratique	Diane Bellemare	7,407	20.70	+10.91
UFP	Thérèse Hamel	394	1.10	-0.42

Quebec provincial by-election, October 1, 2001
Party	Candidate	Votes	%
Parti Québécois	Richard Legendre	10,323	46.25
Liberal	Jocelyne Roch	8,990	40.28
Action démocratique	Michel Paulette	2,186	9.79
Bloc Pot	Sylvain Mainville	384	1.72
Alternative progressiste	Thérèse Hamel	339	1.52
Independent	Régent Millette	97	0.44
Total valid votes		22,319	98.63
Rejected and declined votes		309	1.37
Turnout		22,628	48.58
Electors on the lists		46,581	
Source: Elections Quebec

1998 Quebec general election
Party	Candidate	Votes	%	±%
Parti Québécois	Céline Signori	17,692	50.99	-0.41
Liberal	Pierre Saucier	9,719	28.01	-3.83
Action démocratique	Lysane O'Sullivan	7,102	20.47	+6.38
Socialist Democracy	Denise Gagnon	182	0.52	-

1995 Quebec referendum
Side	Votes	%
Oui	23,134	63.01
Non	13,583	36.99

1994 Quebec general election
Party	Candidate	Votes	%
Parti Québécois	Céline Signori	15,273	51.40
Liberal	Mario Massie	9,460	31.84
Action démocratique	Michel Pigeon	4,188	14.09
Sovereignty	Michel Labrèche	470	1.58
Natural Law	Martin Howe	322	1.08

== See also ==
- List of Quebec provincial electoral districts
- Canadian provincial electoral districts
