= Georges Héon =

Canadian politician

Member of Parliament for Argenteuil
- In office June 1945 – June 1949
- Preceded by: James McGibbon
- Succeeded by: Philippe Valois
- In office February 1938 – March 1940
- Preceded by: George Halsey Perley
- Succeeded by: James McGibbon

Personal details
- Born: Georges-Henri Héon; 6 September 1902 Saint-Wenceslas, Quebec, Canada
- Died: 8 January 1965 (aged 62)
- Party: Independent Conservative; Independent Progressive Conservative
- Spouse(s): Jeannette Therrien m. 10 May 1941
- Profession: crown attorney, lawyer

Georges-Henri Héon, QC (6 September 1902 – 8 January 1965) was an Independent Conservative and Independent Progressive Conservative member of the House of Commons of Canada.

== Biography ==
He was born in Saint-Wenceslas, Quebec and became a crown attorney and lawyer by profession.

Héon attended Victoria Commercial College in Victoriaville, St Charles College in Sherbrooke, then the Université de Montréal attaining Bachelor of Arts and Master of Laws degrees. He served as a senior Crown Attorney for Terrebonne district, then as a municipal solicitor for Lachute. He received a King's Counsel designation by the late 1940s.

He was first elected to Parliament at the Argenteuil riding as an Independent Conservative in a by-election on 28 February 1938 but was defeated in the 1940 federal election in which he ran as an official Conservative candidate under the National Government banner the party was using in that election. Héon lost to James McGibbon of the Liberal party.

Although Héon frequently took a nationalist position, he sided with plans for Canada to join World War II when the issue was debated in Parliament in September 1939 but opposed plans to introduce conscription.

Héon won back Argenteuil in the 1945 election as an Independent Progressive Conservative, and served a full term. He was a close ally of Renaud Chapdelaine and campaigned with him in the 6 June 1949 by-election that elected Chapdelaine to the House of Commons as a Progressive Conservative MP. Héon subsequently joined the Progressive Conservative caucus immediately prior to the beginning of the 1949 federal election campaign and became party leader George A. Drew's Quebec lieutenant in charge of the Tory campaign in that province. Due to redistribution he ran for re-election in the new riding of Argenteuil—Deux-Montagnes and was defeated by Philippe Valois of the Liberals.
