= Nadine Le Gal =

Quebec politician

Nadine Le Gal MNA

Member of the National Assembly for Blainville
- Incumbent
- Assumed office October 5, 2026
- Preceded by: Mario Laframboise

Personal details
- Party: Parti Québécois
- Education: Université de Montréal

Nadine Le Gal is a Quebec politician who was the elected to the National Assembly of Quebec for Blainville in the 2026 Quebec general election as a member of the Parti Québécois. She is a graduate of the University of Montreal with a bachelor's degree in law and a member of the Quebec Bar since 1994.

Following her election, Le Gal was appointed the Government Caucus Chair in 2026.

== Electoral record ==
2026 Quebec general election: Blainville
** Preliminary results — Not yet official **
| Party | Candidate | Votes | % | ±% |
|---|---|---|---|---|
| Parti Québécois | Nadine Le Gal | 15,000 | 33.69 | +18.26 |
| Liberal | Sébastien Daoust | 11,822 | 26.55 | +15.52 |
| Conservative | Pascal Quevillon | 7,112 | 15.97 | +6.21 |
| Coalition Avenir Québec | Mario Laframboise | 6,418 | 14.42 | –35.03 |
| Québec solidaire | Louis Piette | 3,448 | 7.74 | –6.26 |
| Climat Québec | Marie-Claude Archambault | 723 | 1.62 | N/A |
| Total valid votes | | 44,523 | 98.49 | –0.12 |
| Total rejected ballots | | 682 | 1.51 | +0.12 |
| Turnout | | 45,205 | 72.36 | +0.24 |
| Electors on the lists | | 62,470 | | |
| Parti Québécois gain from Coalition Avenir Québec | | Swing | | +1.37 |
Source: Élections Québec
