= Thomas Christie (Canadian politician) =

Canadian politician

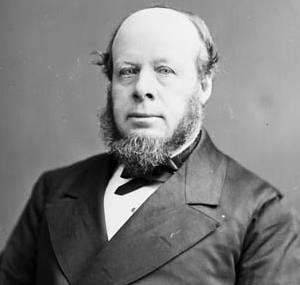

Member of the Canadian Parliament for Argenteuil
- In office 1875–1880
- Preceded by: Lemuel Cushing, Jr.
- Succeeded by: John Abbott
- In office 1891–1902
- Preceded by: James Crocket Wilson
- Succeeded by: Thomas Christie, Jr.

Personal details
- Born: March 8, 1834 Glasgow, Scotland
- Died: August 5, 1902 (aged 68) Lachute, Quebec, Canada
- Party: Liberal
- Children: Thomas Christie, Jr.

Thomas Christie (8 March 1834 – 5 August 1902) was a Scottish-born physician, professor and political figure in Quebec. He represented Argenteuil in the House of Commons of Canada from 1875 to 1880 and from 1891 to 1902 as a Liberal member.

He was born in Glasgow, the son of John Christie and Elizabeth Nichol, and came to Lower Canada with his parents in 1827. Christie was educated at McGill University, receiving an M.D. In 1849, he married Catherine McMartin. He was chairman of the board of school commissioners. Christie also served as mayor of Jerusalem parish and of Lachute and as warden for Argenteuil County. Christie helped establish the Lachute Academy in 1855 and also served as lecturer and secretary for the academy. Christie was first elected to the House of Commons in an 1875 by-election held after the election of Lemuel Cushing was overturned. He was elected again in 1878, but that election was overturned on appeal. He lost two subsequent by-elections to John Abbott and was later reelected in 1891, 1896 and 1900. Christie died in office in 1902 at the age of 68.

His son Thomas succeeded him as representative for Argenteuil in the House of Commons in 1902.

1900 Canadian federal election: Argenteuil
Party	Candidate	Votes	%	±%
Liberal	Thomas Christie	1,239	57.65	
Conservative	William John Simpson	910	42.35	

1896 Canadian federal election: Argenteuil
Party	Candidate	Votes	%	±%
Liberal	Thomas Christie	1,125	51.72	
Conservative	Harry Abbott	1,050	48.28	

1891 Canadian federal election: Argenteuil
Party	Candidate	Votes	%	±%
Liberal	Thomas Christie	1,050	55.32	
Conservative	William Owens	848	44.68	
