= Mario Laframboise =

Canadian politician (born 1957)

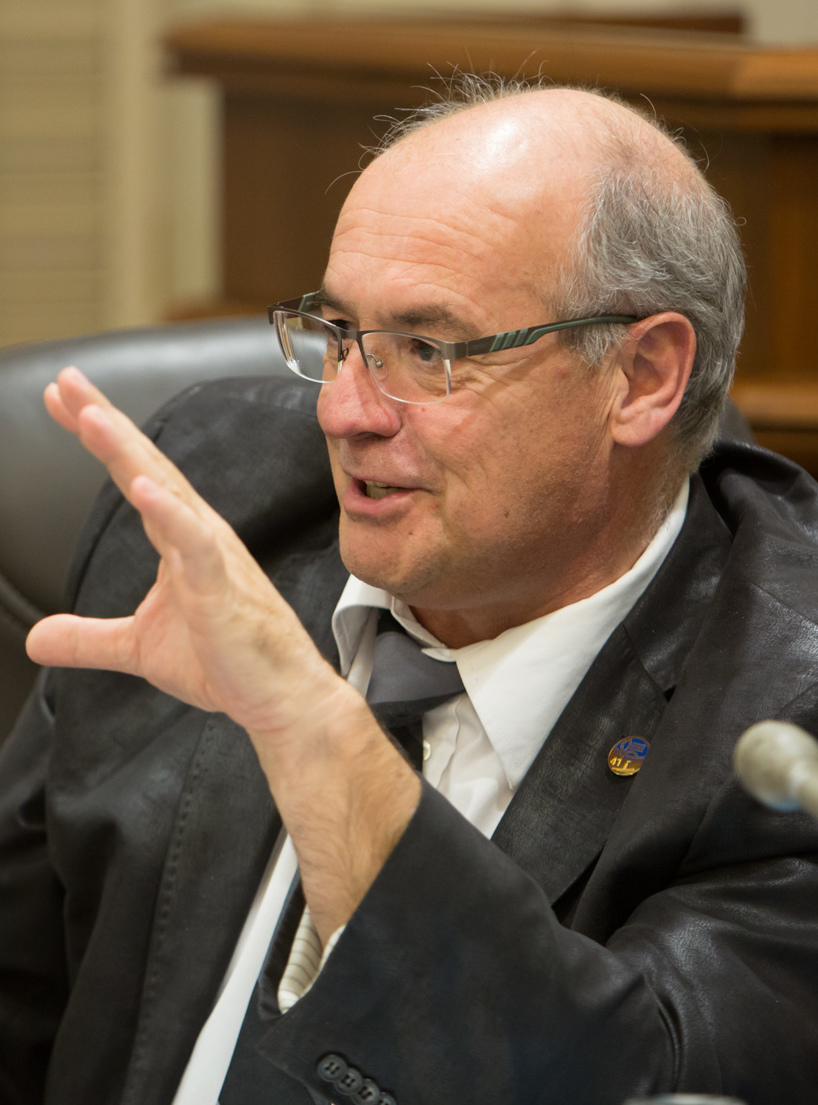
- Laframboise in 2015

Member of the National Assembly of Quebec for Blainville
- In office April 7, 2014 – October 5, 2026
- Preceded by: Daniel Ratthé
- Succeeded by: Nadine Le Gal

Member of Parliament for Argenteuil—Papineau—Mirabel
- In office November 27, 2000 – May 2, 2011
- Preceded by: Maurice Dumas
- Succeeded by: Mylène Freeman

Personal details
- Born: November 7, 1957 (age 68) Notre-Dame-de-la-Paix, Quebec, Canada
- Party: Coalition Avenir Québec (provincial)
- Other political affiliations: Bloc Québécois (federal)
- Profession: Notary

Mario Laframboise MNA (born November 7, 1957) is a Canadian politician who served as mayor of Notre-Dame-de-la-Paix and Reeve of the Papineau MRC before getting into federal and later provincial politics.

== Political career ==
In the 2000 Canadian federal election, Laframboise was elected to the House of Commons as the Bloc Québécois candidate in the riding of Argenteuil—Papineau—Mirabel. He was easily re-elected in the 2004, 2006 and 2008 elections, however he was defeated in the 2011 election by NDP's Mylène Freeman. A former notary, he was the Bloc critic to the Minister of Transport and later to the Minister of Infrastructure. He was also vice-president of the federal permanent committee of Transport, Infrastructure and Communities.

Laframboise was the Coalition Avenir Québec candidate for the June 11, 2012, by-election in the provincial riding of Argenteuil. He came in third. He was again defeated by Richer in the 2012 general election. In the 2014 general election he switched to the riding of Blainville, where he was elected.

During his tenure as MP his priorities were centered on the local economy which is especially dominated by the forestry, tourism and agriculture sectors especially in the Petite-Nation region. When the Conservative government of Stephen Harper was elected to power after the 2006 election, Laframboise urged them to adopt a motion by the Bloc Québécois that would have modified the Employment Insurance Bill which would have helped workers who've lost their jobs - at that time a local Thurso sawmill closed in early 2006.

He mentioned that the Conservatives had promised during the election to create an independent employment insurance program. The MP and his party also wanted measures to help more aged workers when they lost their jobs.

Despite its support over the Kyoto Accord, Laframboise also supported the completion of Autoroute 50 between Gatineau and Lachute in the Laurentians which has been planned for years in order to provide an alternative way to the dangerous Route 148 which was the scene of numerous fatal accidents over the years in the Petite-Nation region. During his mandates, he criticized the lack of participation of the federal government (during the Liberal era) over the construction of it. However, the lack of funding forced the Quebec government to build only a Super-2 highway, while Laframboise wanted a four-lane traditional Autoroute to facilitated a triangular corridor formed by Montreal, Gatineau and the Mont-Tremblant ski resort in the Laurentians. He mentioned that a two-lane highway would become as dangerous as the Route 175 that crossed the Laurentians Wildlife Reserve north of Quebec City.

Laframboise was unseated in the 2026 Quebec general election.

== Electoral record ==
=== Provincial ===
2026 Quebec general election: Blainville
** Preliminary results — Not yet official **
Party	Candidate	Votes	%	±%
Parti Québécois	Nadine Le Gal	15,000	33.69	+18.26
Liberal	Sébastien Daoust	11,822	26.55	+15.52
Conservative	Pascal Quevillon	7,112	15.97	+6.21
Coalition Avenir Québec	Mario Laframboise	6,418	14.42	–35.03
Québec solidaire	Louis Piette	3,448	7.74	–6.26
Climat Québec	Marie-Claude Archambault	723	1.62	N/A
Total valid votes		44,523	98.49	–0.12
Total rejected ballots		682	1.51	+0.12
Turnout		45,205	72.36	+0.24
Electors on the lists		62,470		
Parti Québécois gain from Coalition Avenir Québec		Swing		+1.37
Source: Élections Québec

2022 Quebec general election: Blainville
Party	Candidate	Votes	%	±%
Coalition Avenir Québec	Mario Laframboise	21,149	49.45	+1.18
Parti Québécois	Frédéric Labelle	6,600	15.43	+1.88
Québec solidaire	Éric Michaud	5,987	14.00	-1.12
Liberal	Alexandre Mercho	4,718	11.03	-8.04
Conservative	Grace Daou	4,175	9.76	–
Démocratie directe	Marie-France Hanna	140	0.33	–
Total valid votes		42,769	98.61	–
Total rejected ballots		601	1.39	-0.38
Turnout		43,370	72.12	-2.44
Electors on the lists		60,137	–	–
Coalition Avenir Québec hold		Swing		-0.35

2018 Quebec general election: Blainville
Party	Candidate	Votes	%	±%
Coalition Avenir Québec	Mario Laframboise	20,457	48.27	+14.35
Liberal	Lucia Carvalho	8,082	19.07	-10.44
Québec solidaire	William Lepage	6,408	15.12	+8.6
Parti Québécois	Gabriel Gousse	5,744	13.55	-15.98
Green	Valérie Fortier	1,146	2.7	
New Democratic	Thierry Gervais	286	0.67	
Citoyens au pouvoir	Jean Bastien	254	0.6	
Total valid votes		42,377	98.24	
Total rejected ballots		761	1.76	
Turnout		43,138	74.56	
Eligible voters		57,856		
Coalition Avenir Québec hold		Swing		+12.40
Source(s) "Rapport des résultats officiels du scrutin". Élections Québec.

2014 Quebec general election
Party	Candidate	Votes	%	±%
Coalition Avenir Québec	Mario Laframboise	15,075	33.92	-7.41
Liberal	Marie-Claude Collin	13,118	29.51	+13.66
Parti Québécois	Gyslaine Desrosiers	13,046	29.53	-6.17
Québec solidaire	Annie Giguère	2,898	6.52	+2.63
Équipe Autonomiste	Jean Philippe Fournier	312	0.70	-
Total valid votes		44,449	98.08	
Total rejected, unmarked and declined ballots		868	1.92	+0.86
Turnout		45,317	76.85	-5.01
Eligible voters		58,968		
Coalition Avenir Québec hold		Swing		-10.53

2012 Quebec general election
Party	Candidate	Votes	%	±%
Parti Québécois	Roland Richer	12,449	38.52	+2.14
Liberal	Lise Proulx	9,387	29.05	-4.07
Coalition Avenir Québec	Mario Laframboise	8,564	26.50	+5.08
Québec solidaire	Yvan Zanetti	855	2.65	-0.09
Green	Stephen Matthews	653	2.02	-0.99
Option nationale	Patrick Sabourin	409	1.27	-0.04
Total valid votes		32,317	99.04	–
Total rejected ballots		314	0.96	–
Turnout		32,631	74.33	+31.85
Electors on the lists		43,902	–	–

Quebec provincial by-election, June 11, 2012
Party	Candidate	Votes	%	±%
Parti Québécois	Roland Richer	6,568	36.16	+2.54
Liberal	Lise Proulx	6,067	33.40	-16.18
Coalition Avenir Québec	Mario Laframboise	3,887	21.40	+10.16
Green	Claude Sabourin	543	2.99	-0.49
Québec solidaire	Yvan Zanetti	490	2.70	+0.61
Option nationale	Patrick Sabourin	243	1.34	
Conservative	Jean Lecavalier	190	1.05	
Independent	Georges Lapointe	151	0.83	
Autonomist Team	Gérald Nicolas	26	0.14	
Total valid votes		18,165	98.71	–
Total rejected ballots		237	1.29	–
Turnout		18,402	42.36	
Electors on the lists		43,441	–	–

=== Federal ===
2011 Canadian federal election
Party	Candidate	Votes	%	±%	Expenditures
New Democratic	Mylène Freeman	25,801	44.24	+31.84	
Bloc Québécois	Mario Laframboise	16,876	28.94	-19.16	
Liberal	Daniel Fox	7,175	12.30	-5.85	
Conservative	Yvan Patry	6,497	11.14	-6.29	
Green	Stephen Matthews	1,506	2.58	-1.16	
Independent	Michel Daniel Guibord	342	0.59	–	
Marxist–Leninist	Christian-Simon Ferlatte	123	0.21	+0.03	
Total valid vote/Expense limit		58,320	100.00		

Source: Elections Canada

2008 Canadian federal election: Argenteuil—Papineau—Mirabel
Party	Candidate	Votes	%	±%	Expenditures
Bloc Québécois	Mario Laframboise	26,455	48.10	−4.03	$75,734
Liberal	André Robert	9,984	18.15	+4.70	$11,373
Conservative	Scott Pearce	9,584	17.43	−5.89	$35,878
New Democratic	Alain Senécal	6,819	12.40	+5.91	none listed
Green	Pierre Audette	2,055	3.74	−0.90	none listed
Marxist–Leninist	Christian-Simon Ferlatte	98	0.18		none listed
Total valid votes		54,995	100.00		
Total rejected ballots		816	1.46		
Turnout		55,811	60.86	−1.80	
Electors on the lists		91,705			
Bloc Québécois hold		Swing		−4.4	
Sources: Official Results, Elections Canada and Financial Returns, Elections Canada.

2006 Canadian federal election: Argenteuil—Papineau—Mirabel
Party	Candidate	Votes	%	±%	Expenditures
Bloc Québécois	Mario Laframboise	27,855	52.13	−5.27	$55,659
Conservative	Suzanne Courville	12,461	23.32	+16.28	$41,061
Liberal	François-Hugues Liberge	7,171	13.42	−13.45	$12,534
New Democratic	Alain Senécal	3,466	6.49	+3.45	$1,480
Green	Claude Sabourin	2,480	4.64	−0.46	$1,166
Total valid votes		53,433	100.00		
Total rejected ballots		846	1.56		
Turnout		54,279	62.66	+2.33	
Electors on the lists		86,627			
Bloc Québécois hold		Swing		−10.8	
Sources: Official Results, Elections Canada and Financial Returns, Elections Canada.

2004 Canadian federal election: Argenteuil—Mirabel
Party	Candidate	Votes	%	±%	Expenditures
Bloc Québécois	Mario Laframboise	28,228	57.40	+14.41	$60,403
Liberal	Yves Sabourin	13,214	26.87	−15.55	$39,904
Conservative	David H. McArthur	3,460	7.04	−2.36	$7,918
Green	Claude Sabourin	2,510	5.10		$1,090
New Democratic	Elisabeth Clark	1,493	3.04	+2.00	none listed
Christian Heritage	Laurent Filion	202	0.41		none listed
Marxist–Leninist	Michael O'Grady	69	0.14		none listed
Total valid votes		49,176	100.00		
Total rejected ballots		1,119			
Turnout		50,295	60.33	−1.31	
Electors on the lists		83,364			
Sources: Percentage change figures are factored for redistribution. Conservative Party percentages are contrasted with the combined Canadian Alliance and Progressive Conservative percentages from 2000. Official Results, Elections Canada and Financial Returns, Elections Canada.

2000 Canadian federal election: Argenteuil—Papineau—Mirabel
Party	Candidate	Votes	%	±%	Expenditures
Bloc Québécois	Mario Laframboise	21,713	43.20	+2.33	$63,057
Liberal	Lise Bourgault	21,171	42.12	+8.10	$59,477
Alliance	Francine Labelle	2,897	5.76		$2,011
Progressive Conservative	Jean-Denis Pelletier	1,848	3.68	−17.86	$6,611
Marijuana	Pierre Audette	934	1.86	–	none listed
Green	Gilles Bisson	723	1.44		$16
New Democratic	Didier Charles	550	1.09	−0.52	none listed
Natural Law	Marie-Thérèse Nault	256	0.51	−0.47	none listed
Christian Heritage	Laurent Filion	167	0.33	−0.64	$138
Total valid votes		50,259	100.00		
Total rejected ballots		1,387			
Turnout		51,646	63.74	−7.63	
Electors on the lists		81,024			
Sources: Official Results, Elections Canada and Financial Returns, Elections Canada.
