= James Wright McGibbon =

Canadian politician

James Wright McGibbon (December 5, 1901 – 10 October 1965) was a timber merchant and federal politician in Quebec.

McGibbon was born in Lachute, Quebec in the Laurentians and was first elected to the House of Commons of Canada in the Canadian federal election in Argenteuil as a Liberal and defeated Conservative incumbent Georges-Henri Héon. McGibbon was, in turn, defeated by Héon in the 1945 federal election.

Prior to entering federal politics, McGibbon was an alderman on the Lachute town council for six years.
