= Argenteuil—Papineau—Mirabel =

Former federal electoral district in Quebec, Canada

Coordinates: 45.6°N 74.0°W

Quebec electoral district
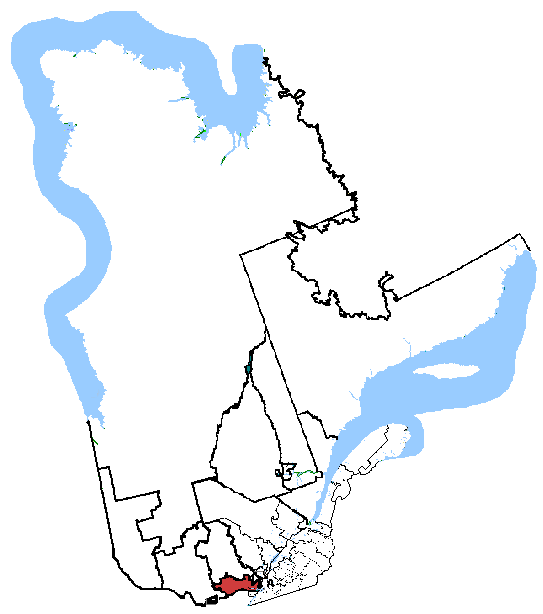
- Argenteuil—Papineau—Mirabel in relation to other Quebec federal electoral districts.

Defunct federal electoral district
- Legislature: House of Commons
- District created: 1867
- District abolished: 2012
- First contested: 1867
- Last contested: 2011
- District webpage: profile, map

Demographics
- Population (2011): 124,180
- Electors (2011): 91,705
- Area (km²): 5,200.27
- Census division(s): Argenteuil RCM, Deux-Montagnes RCM, Mirabel RCM, Papineau RCM, Les Pays-d'en-Haut RCM
- Census subdivision(s): Boisbriand (part), Brownsburg-Chatham, Lachute, Mirabel, Oka, Pointe-Calumet, Saint-André-Avellin, Saint-André-d'Argenteuil, Saint-Joseph-du-Lac, Thurso

Argenteuil—Papineau—Mirabel (French pronunciation: [aʁʒɑ̃tœj papino miʁabɛl]; formerly known as Argenteuil, Argenteuil—Papineau and Argenteuil—Deux-Montagnes) was a federal electoral district in Quebec, Canada, that was represented in the House of Commons of Canada from 1867 to 2015.

== Geography ==
Initially, Argenteuil consisted of the Parishes of Saint Andrews, Saint Jérusalem, part of the Parish of St. Jérome, the Townships of Chatham, Wentworth, Grenville and Augmentation, Harrington and Augmentation, Gore, Howard, Arundel, Montcalm Wolfe, Salaberry and Grandisson, and part of the Township of Morin.

In 1882, the townships of Salaberry, Wolfe and Grandison were detached from Argenteuil and annexed to Terrebonne.

In 1924, Argenteuil electoral district was redefined to consist of the County of Argenteuil.

In 1933, Argenteuil electoral district was expanded to include the portion of the County of Two-Mountains lying north of the North River, consisting of the municipality of St-Colomban and the northern part of the municipality of St-Canut.

The electoral district was abolished in 1947 and became part of Argenteuil—Deux-Montagnes.

In 1966, Argenteuil electoral district was re-created, consisting of the City of Deux-Montagnes, the Towns of Barkmere, Lachute, Oka-sur-le-Lac and Saint-Eustache, the Counties of Argenteuil and Deux-Montagnes, and the village municipality of Saint-Sauveur-des-Monts and the parish municipality of Saint-Sauveur in the County of Terrebonne.

The electoral district's name was changed in 1970 to Argenteuil—Deux-Montagnes.

In 1976, the name reverted to Argenteuil when it was slightly redistricted: Deux-Montagnes, Pointe-Calumet and Saint-Joseph-du-Lac became part of a new district, with the rest of Deux-Montagnes county remaining in Argenteuil, while Saint-Sauveur and Saint-Sauveur-des-Monts where transferred to join most of Terrebonne county in Labelle (federal electoral district). Its name changed in 1980 to Argenteuil—Papineau.

In 1987, it was redefined to consist of the towns of Barkmere, Lachute and Mirabel, the County of Argenteuil, and parts of the Counties of Deux-Montagnes and Papineau.

In 1996, it was redefined to consist of the cities of Barkmere, Lachute, Mirabel and Thurso, the county regional municipalities of Argenteuil, Papineau, and Deux-Montagnes, including Kanesatake Indian Reserve No. 16, excepting the cities of Deux-Montagnes, Saint-Eustache and Sainte-Marthe-sur-le-Lac, the Parish Municipality of Saint-Colomban, the township municipalities of Amherst and Arundel, and the municipalities of Huberdeau, Montcalm, Lac-des-Seize-Îles, Morin-Heights, Saint-Adolphe-d'Howard and Wentworth-Nord.

Argenteuil—Papineau—Mirabel now consists of the City of Mirabel, the regional county municipalities of Argenteuil and Papineau, the municipalities of Oka, Pointe-Calumet, Saint-Joseph-du-Lac and Saint-Placide, including Kanesatake Indian Lands No. 16, and the municipalities of Lac-des-Seize-Îles, Morin-Heights, Saint-Adolphe-d'Howard and Wentworth-Nord.

The neighbouring ridings are Pontiac, Laurentides—Labelle, Rivière-du-Nord, Terrebonne—Blainville, Marc-Aurèle-Fortin, Rivière-des-Mille-Îles, Pierrefonds—Dollard, Lac-Saint-Louis, Vaudreuil-Soulanges, and Glengarry—Prescott—Russell.

== Members of Parliament ==
This riding has elected the following members of Parliament:

Parliament	Years	Member	Party
Argenteuil
1st	1867–1872	John Abbott	Liberal–Conservative
2nd	1872–1874	John Abbott	Liberal–Conservative
3rd	1874–1874	John Abbott	Liberal–Conservative
3rd	1874–1875	Lemuel Cushing Jr.	Liberal
3rd	1875–1878	Thomas Christie	Liberal
4th	1878–1880	Thomas Christie	Liberal
4th	1880–1882	John Abbott	Liberal–Conservative
5th	1882–1887	John Abbott	Liberal–Conservative
6th	1887–1891	James Crocket Wilson	Liberal–Conservative
7th	1891–1896	Thomas Christie	Liberal
8th	1896–1900	Thomas Christie	Liberal
9th	1900–1902	Thomas Christie	Liberal
9th	1902–1904	Thomas Christie Jr.	Liberal
10th	1904–1908	George Halsey Perley	Conservative
11th	1908–1911	George Halsey Perley	Conservative
12th	1911–1917	George Halsey Perley	Conservative
13th	1917–1921	Peter Robert McGibbon	Liberal
14th	1921–1921	Peter Robert McGibbon	Liberal
14th	1922–1925	Charles Stewart	Liberal
15th	1925–1926	George Halsey Perley	Conservative
16th	1926–1930	George Halsey Perley	Conservative
17th	1930–1935	George Halsey Perley	Conservative
18th	1935–1938	George Halsey Perley	Conservative
18th	1938–1940	Georges Héon	Independent Conservative
19th	1940–1945	James Wright McGibbon	Liberal
20th	1945–1949	Georges Héon	Independent Progressive Conservative
Argenteuil—Deux-Montagnes
21st	1949–1953	Philippe Valois	Liberal
22nd	1953–1957	Philippe Valois	Liberal
23rd	1957–1958	Philippe Valois	Liberal
24th	1958–1962	Joseph-Octave Latour	Progressive Conservative
25th	1962–1963	Vincent Drouin	Liberal
26th	1963–1965	Vincent Drouin	Liberal
27th	1965–1968	Roger Régimbal	Progressive Conservative
Argenteuil
28th	1968–1972	Robert Major	Liberal
Argenteuil—Deux-Montagnes
29th	1972–1974	Francis Fox	Liberal
30th	1974–1979	Francis Fox	Liberal
Argenteuil
31st	1979–1980	Robert Gourd	Liberal
32nd	1980–1984	Robert Gourd	Liberal
Argenteuil—Papineau
33rd	1984–1988	Lise Bourgault	Progressive Conservative
34th	1988–1993	Lise Bourgault	Progressive Conservative
35th	1993–1997	Maurice Dumas	Bloc Québécois
Argenteuil—Papineau—Mirabel
36th	1997–2000	Maurice Dumas	Bloc Québécois
37th	2000–2004	Mario Laframboise	Bloc Québécois
Argenteuil—Mirabel
38th	2004–2006	Mario Laframboise	Bloc Québécois
Argenteuil—Papineau—Mirabel
39th	2006–2008	Mario Laframboise	Bloc Québécois
40th	2008–2011	Mario Laframboise	Bloc Québécois
41st	2011–2015	Mylène Freeman	New Democratic
Riding dissolved into Argenteuil—La Petite-Nation and Mirabel

== Election results ==
=== Argenteuil—Papineau—Mirabel 2004-2011 ===
2011 Canadian federal election
Party	Candidate	Votes	%	±%	Expenditures
New Democratic	Mylène Freeman	25,802	44.27	+31.87	$0.00
Bloc Québécois	Mario Laframboise	16,880	28.96	-19.14	$77,499.72
Liberal	Daniel Fox	7,135	12.24	-5.91	$67,191.80
Conservative	Yvan Patry	6,497	11.15	-6.28	$30,881.78
Green	Stephen Matthews	1,506	2.58	-1.16	$888.62
Independent	Michel Daniel Guibord	342	0.59	–	$1,904.02
Marxist–Leninist	Christian-Simon Ferlatte	117	0.20	+0.02	$0.00
Total valid votes/Expense limit		58,279	100.00		
Total rejected ballots		776	1.31	-0.15	
Turnout		59,055	61.27	+0.41	
New Democratic Party gain from Bloc Québécois		Swing	+25.5		

Source: Elections Canada

2008 Canadian federal election
Party	Candidate	Votes	%	±%	Expenditures
Bloc Québécois	Mario Laframboise	26,455	48.10	−4.03	$75,734
Liberal	André Robert	9,984	18.15	+4.70	$11,373
Conservative	Scott Pearce	9,584	17.43	−5.89	$35,878
New Democratic	Alain Senécal	6,819	12.40	+5.91	none listed
Green	Pierre Audette	2,055	3.74	−0.90	none listed
Marxist–Leninist	Christian-Simon Ferlatte	98	0.18		none listed
Total valid votes		54,995	100.00		
Total rejected ballots		816	1.46		
Turnout		55,811	60.86	−1.80	
Electors on the lists		91,705			
Bloc Québécois hold		Swing		−4.4	
Sources: Official Results, Elections Canada and Financial Returns, Elections Canada.

2006 Canadian federal election
Party	Candidate	Votes	%	±%	Expenditures
Bloc Québécois	Mario Laframboise	27,855	52.13	−5.27	$55,659
Conservative	Suzanne Courville	12,461	23.32	+16.28	$41,061
Liberal	François-Hugues Liberge	7,171	13.42	−13.45	$12,534
New Democratic	Alain Senécal	3,466	6.49	+3.45	$1,480
Green	Claude Sabourin	2,480	4.64	−0.46	$1,166
Total valid votes		53,433	100.00		
Total rejected ballots		846	1.56		
Turnout		54,279	62.66	+2.33	
Electors on the lists		86,627			
Bloc Québécois hold		Swing		−10.8	
Sources: Official Results, Elections Canada and Financial Returns, Elections Canada.

=== Argenteuil—Mirabel 2004 ===
2004 Canadian federal election
Party	Candidate	Votes	%	±%	Expenditures
Bloc Québécois	Mario Laframboise	28,228	57.40	+14.41	$60,403
Liberal	Yves Sabourin	13,214	26.87	−15.55	$39,904
Conservative	David H. McArthur	3,460	7.04	−2.36	$7,918
Green	Claude Sabourin	2,510	5.10		$1,090
New Democratic	Elisabeth Clark	1,493	3.04	+2.00	none listed
Christian Heritage	Laurent Filion	202	0.41		none listed
Marxist–Leninist	Michael O'Grady	69	0.14		none listed
Total valid votes		49,176	100.00		
Total rejected ballots		1,119			
Turnout		50,295	60.33	−1.31	
Electors on the lists		83,364			
Sources: Percentage change figures are factored for redistribution. Conservative Party percentages are contrasted with the combined Canadian Alliance and Progressive Conservative percentages from 2000. Official Results, Elections Canada and Financial Returns, Elections Canada.

=== Argenteuil—Papineau—Mirabel 2000 ===
2000 Canadian federal election
Party	Candidate	Votes	%	±%	Expenditures
Bloc Québécois	Mario Laframboise	21,713	43.20	+2.33	$63,057
Liberal	Lise Bourgault	21,171	42.12	+8.10	$59,477
Alliance	Francine Labelle	2,897	5.76		$2,011
Progressive Conservative	Jean-Denis Pelletier	1,848	3.68	−17.86	$6,611
Marijuana	Pierre Audette	934	1.86	–	none listed
Green	Gilles Bisson	723	1.44		$16
New Democratic	Didier Charles	550	1.09	−0.52	none listed
Natural Law	Marie-Thérèse Nault	256	0.51	−0.47	none listed
Christian Heritage	Laurent Filion	167	0.33	−0.64	$138
Total valid votes		50,259	100.00		
Total rejected ballots		1,387			
Turnout		51,646	63.74	−7.63	
Electors on the lists		81,024			
Sources: Official Results, Elections Canada and Financial Returns, Elections Canada.

=== Argenteuil—Papineau 1984-1997 ===
1997 Canadian federal election
Party	Candidate	Votes	%	±%	Expenditures
Bloc Québécois	Maurice Dumas	21,202	40.87		$62,394
Liberal	Stéphane Hébert	17,648	34.02	–	$38,356
Progressive Conservative	André Robert	11,171	21.54		$22,288
New Democratic	Didier Charles	836	1.61		$360
Natural Law	Marie-Thérèse Nault	509	0.98		$0
Christian Heritage	Laurent Filion	505	0.97		$3,337
Total valid votes		51,871	100.00		
Total rejected ballots		1,869			
Turnout		53,740	71.37		
Electors on the lists		75,301			
Sources: Official Results, Elections Canada and Financial Returns, Elections Canada.

1993 Canadian federal election
Party	Candidate	Votes	%	±%
Bloc Québécois	Maurice Dumas	23,360	47.25%	
Liberal	Jacques Desforges	14,234	28.79%	+1.7%
Progressive Conservative	Lise Bourgault	10,959	22.17%	-34.2%
New Democratic	Jean G. Drapeau	888	1.80%	-12.3%
Total valid votes		49,374	100.0%	

1988 Canadian federal election
Party	Candidate	Votes	%	±%
Progressive Conservative	Lise Bourgault	23,076	56.43%	+0.5%
Liberal	Peter Georgakakos	11,088	27.11%	-4.9%
New Democratic	André Marc Paré	5,772	14.11%	+7.0%
Rhinoceros	Michel Le Whip Paré	959	2.35%	-0.2%
Total valid votes		40,895	100.0%	

1984 Canadian federal election
Party	Candidate	Votes	%	±%
Progressive Conservative	Lise Bourgault	21,105	55.93%	+39.9%
Liberal	Robert Gourd	12,096	32.06%	-36.5%
New Democratic	Bjorn L. Johansson	2,671	7.08%	-0.5%
Rhinoceros	Claude Sam Sabourin	946	2.51%	-1.5%
Parti nationaliste	François Granger	566	1.50%	
Independent	Alphonse J. Bélec	350	0.93%	
Total valid votes		37,734	100.0%	

=== Argenteuil 1976-1980 ===
1980 Canadian federal election
Party	Candidate	Votes	%	±%
Liberal	Robert Gourd	21,976	68.60%	+4.3%
Progressive Conservative	Benoit Parent	5,128	16.01%	-1.2%
New Democratic	Ida Brown	2,422	7.56%	+3.0%
Rhinoceros	Yo François Gourd	1,298	4.05%	
Social Credit	Maurice Marcoux	1,074	3.35%	-7.7%
Marxist–Leninist	Jacques Cote	135	0.42%	+0.0%
Total valid votes		32,033	100.0%	
Source(s) "Argenteuil, Quebec (1979-03-26 - 1981-01-16)". History of Federal Ridings Since 1867. Library of Parliament.

1979 Canadian federal election
Party	Candidate	Votes	%
Liberal	Robert Gourd	22,043	64.27%
Progressive Conservative	George Kirby	5,889	17.17%
Social Credit	Antoine Bedard	3,780	11.02%
New Democratic	Thérèse Gardner Pelletier	1,576	4.60%
Rhinoceros	Michel Rivard	699	2.04%
Marxist–Leninist	Jacques Cote	155	0.45%
Union populaire	Lucie Poirier	155	0.45%
Total valid votes		34,297	100.0%

=== Argenteuil—Deux-Montagnes (1970-1976) ===
1974 Canadian federal election
Party	Candidate	Votes	%
Liberal	Francis Fox	20,414	54.51
Progressive Conservative	Roger Régimbal	10,418	27.82
Social Credit	Jean-Marc Fontaine	4,333	11.57
New Democratic Party	Ronald-L. Dufault	2,286	6.10

1972 Canadian federal election
Party	Candidate	Votes	%
Liberal	Francis Fox	18,749	49.47
Social Credit	Jean-Marc Fontaine	8,199	21.63
Progressive Conservative	Michel Chevalier	7,987	21.07
New Democratic Party	Ronald-L. Dufault	1,929	5.09
No affiliation	Michel-E. Trudeau	1,036	2.73

=== Argenteuil (1966-1970) ===
1968 Canadian federal election: Argenteuil
Party	Candidate	Votes	%
Liberal	Robert Major	15,726	48.92
Progressive Conservative	Roger Régimbal	13,566	42.20
New Democratic	Jacques Boucher	1,696	5.28
Ralliement créditiste	Lise Houle	1,158	3.60

=== Argenteuil—Deux-Montagnes (1947-1966) ===
1965 Canadian federal election: Argenteuil—Deux-Montagnes
Party	Candidate	Votes	%
Progressive Conservative	Roger Régimbal	14,035	47.43
Liberal	Vincent Drouin	11,576	39.12
New Democratic	Paul Orr	2,174	7.35
Ralliement créditiste	Ernest Champagne	1,805	6.10

1963 Canadian federal election: Argenteuil—Deux-Montagnes
Party	Candidate	Votes	%
Liberal	Vincent Drouin	12,324	42.80
Progressive Conservative	Roger Régimbal	10,176	35.34
Social Credit	Maurice Gougeon	5,114	17.76
New Democratic	Maurice-W. Hebert	1,179	4.09

1962 Canadian federal election: Argenteuil—Deux-Montagnes
Party	Candidate	Votes	%
Liberal	Vincent Drouin	11,761	42.34
Progressive Conservative	Joseph-Octave Latour	10,589	38.12
Social Credit	Joseph-Orphir Desjardins	4,095	14.74
Independent	Kenneth P. Riley	695	2.50
Unknown	Gilbert Edgar Arnold	636	2.29

1958 Canadian federal election: Argenteuil—Deux-Montagnes
Party	Candidate	Votes	%
Progressive Conservative	Joseph-Octave Latour	14,483	56.57
Liberal	Bernard-L. Gosselin	10,493	40.99
Independent PC	Georges Duhamel	626	2.45

1957 Canadian federal election
Party	Candidate	Votes	%	±%
Liberal	Philippe Valois	10,084	41.89	
Progressive Conservative	Joseph-Octave Latour	8,902	36.98	
Independent Liberal	Antoine Pare	3,983	16.55	
Independent Liberal	Ethel M. McGibbon	1,102	4.58	

1953 Canadian federal election
Party	Candidate	Votes	%	±%
Liberal	Philippe Valois	13,283	70.31	
Progressive Conservative	Linton William Armstrong	5,608	29.69	

1949 Canadian federal election
Party	Candidate	Votes	%	±%
Liberal	Philippe Valois	10,500	50.84	
Progressive Conservative	Georges-Henri Héon	9,672	46.83	
Union of Electors	Joseph-Orphir Desjardins	481	2.33	

=== Argenteuil (1867-1947) ===
1945 Canadian federal election: Argenteuil
Party	Candidate	Votes	%	±%
Independent Progressive Conservative	Georges-Henri Héon	5,349	49.35	
Liberal	James W. McGibbon	5,221	48.16	
Social Credit	Edward Gendron	270		2.49

1940 Canadian federal election: Argenteuil
Party	Candidate	Votes	%	±%
Liberal	James W. McGibbon	5,629	59.93	
National Government	Georges-Henri Héon	3,763	40.07	

By-election: On Mr. Perley's death:

28 February 1938
Party	Candidate	Votes	%	±%
Independent Conservative	Georges-Henri Héon	4,939	57.26	
Liberal	Joseph-Louis-Lorenzo Legault	3,281	38.04	
Independent	Joseph Maurice Navion	405	4.70	

1945 Canadian federal election: Argenteuil
Party	Candidate	Votes	%	±%
Independent Progressive Conservative	Georges-Henri Héon	5,349	49.35	
Liberal	James W. McGibbon	5,221	48.16	
Social Credit	Edward Gendron	270		2.49

1935 Canadian federal election: Argenteuil
Party	Candidate	Votes	%	±%
Conservative	George Halsey Perley	4,467	49.83	
Liberal	Joseph-Louis-Lorenzo Legault	4,290	47.86	
Reconstruction	Pierre-Albert-Arthur Fortin	207	2.31	

1930 Canadian federal election: Argenteuil
Party	Candidate	Votes	%	±%
Conservative	George Halsey Perley	4,709	54.45	
Liberal	Joseph-Louis-Lorenzo Legault	3,940	45.55	

1926 Canadian federal election: Argenteuil
Party	Candidate	Votes	%	±%
Conservative	George Halsey Perley	4,094	51.51	
Liberal	Joseph-Louis-Lorenzo Legault	3,854	48.49	

1925 Canadian federal election: Argenteuil
Party	Candidate	Votes	%	±%
Conservative	George Halsey Perley	3,921	51.31	
Liberal	Joseph-Louis-Lorenzo Legault	3,721	48.69	

By-election: On Mr. McGibbon's death:

28 February 1922
Party	Candidate	Votes	%	±%
Liberal	Charles Stewart	acclaimed		

1921 Canadian federal election: Argenteuil
Party	Candidate	Votes	%	±%
Liberal	Peter Robert McGibbon	3,674	50.69	
Conservative	Thomas Christie Jr.	2,819	38.89	
Progressive	James Elijah Arnold	755		10.42

1917 Canadian federal election: Argenteuil
Party	Candidate	Votes	%	±%
Laurier Liberals	Peter Robert McGibbon	2,113	55.65	
Unionist	Harry Slater	1,684	44.35	

1911 Canadian federal election: Argenteuil
Party	Candidate	Votes	%	±%
Conservative	George Halsey Perley	1,824	59.78	
Liberal	Agenor Henry Tanner	1,227	40.22	

1908 Canadian federal election: Argenteuil
Party	Candidate	Votes	%	±%
Conservative	George Halsey Perley	1,587	54.44	
Liberal	Peter Robert McGibbon	1,328	45.56	

1904 Canadian federal election: Argenteuil
Party	Candidate	Votes	%	±%
Conservative	George Halsey Perley	1,516	53.08	
Liberal	Thomas Christie Jr.	1,340	46.92	

By-election: On Mr. Christie's death:

3 December 1902
Party	Candidate	Votes	%	±%
Liberal	Thomas Christie, Jr.	1,261	54.10	
Conservative	George Halsey Perley	1,070 45.90		

1900 Canadian federal election: Argenteuil
Party	Candidate	Votes	%	±%
Liberal	Thomas Christie	1,239	57.65	
Conservative	William John Simpson	910	42.35	

1896 Canadian federal election: Argenteuil
Party	Candidate	Votes	%	±%
Liberal	Thomas Christie	1,125	51.72	
Conservative	Harry Abbott	1,050	48.28	

1891 Canadian federal election: Argenteuil
Party	Candidate	Votes	%	±%
Liberal	Thomas Christie	1,050	55.32	
Conservative	William Owens	848	44.68	

1887 Canadian federal election: Argenteuil
Party	Candidate	Votes	%	±%
Liberal-Conservative	James Crocket Wilson	1,038	55.63	
Liberal	Robert G. Meikle	828	44.37	

1882 Canadian federal election: Argenteuil
Party	Candidate	Votes	%	±%
Liberal-Conservative	John Abbott	acclaimed		

By-election: On election being declared void:

17 August 1881
Party	Candidate	Votes	%	±%
Liberal-Conservative	John Abbott	acclaimed		

By-election: On election being declared void:

12 February 1880
Party	Candidate	Votes	%	±%
Liberal-Conservative	John Abbott	936	51.68	
Liberal	Thomas Christie	869	48.14	

1878 Canadian federal election: Argenteuil
Party	Candidate	Votes	%	±%
Liberal	Thomas Christie	919	52.54	
Liberal-Conservative	John Abbott	830	47.46	
Source: Canadian Elections Database

By-election: On election being declared void, on petition:

31 December 1875
Party	Candidate	Votes	%	±%
Liberal	Thomas Christie	acclaimed		

By-election: On Mr. Abbott being unseated, on petition:

6 October 1874
Party	Candidate	Votes	%	±%
Liberal	Lemuel Cushing, Jr.	840	53.30	
Unknown	William Owens	736	46.70	

1874 Canadian federal election: Argenteuil
Party	Candidate	Votes	%	±%
Liberal-Conservative	John Abbott	731	50.14	
Unknown	Lemuel Cushing Jr.	727	49.86	
Source: Canadian Elections Database

1872 Canadian federal election: Argenteuil
Party	Candidate	Votes	%	±%
Liberal-Conservative	John Abbott	acclaimed		
Source: Canadian Elections Database

1867 Canadian federal election: Argenteuil
Party	Candidate	Votes	%
Liberal-Conservative	John Abbott	693	53.80
Unknown	B. Hutchins	595	46.20
Source: Canadian Elections Database

== See also ==
- List of Canadian electoral districts
- Historical federal electoral districts of Canada
