= Roger Régimbal =

Canadian politician

Roger E. Régimbal
- Official 1966 portrait

Member of the Canadian Parliament for Argenteuil—Deux-Montagnes
- In office 1965–1968
- Preceded by: Vincent Drouin
- Succeeded by: District was abolished in 1966

Personal details
- Born: October 5, 1921 Sudbury, Ontario
- Died: September 29, 2000 (aged 78)
- Party: Progressive Conservative

Roger E. Régimbal (October 5, 1921 – September 29, 2000) was a Canadian politician.

Born in Sudbury, Ontario, he ran unsuccessfully for the House of Commons of Canada as the Progressive Conservative candidate in the Quebec riding of Argenteuil—Deux-Montagnes in the 1963 federal election. He was elected in the 1965 federal election. He was defeated in the 1968 election and in the 1974 election.

In 1981, he was appointed chairman of Ontario's Council of Franco-Ontarian Affairs by the Premier of Ontario William Davis. In 1984, he was appointed to Ontario's Workers' Compensation Board. He retired in 1988.
