= Robert Major =

Canadian politician

Robert Benoit Major

Member of Parliament for Argenteuil
- In office June 1968 – September 1972

Personal details
- Born: 17 February 1915 Ottawa, Ontario
- Died: 7 August 1997 (aged 82) Saint-Lambert, Quebec
- Party: Liberal
- Spouse(s): Georgette Vien (m. 7 Oct 1939)
- Children: Michel and Helene
- Profession: administrator

Robert Benoît Joseph Alberic Laurier Major (17 February 1915 – 7 August 1997) was a Liberal party member of the House of Commons of Canada. Born in Ottawa, Ontario, he was an administrator by career.

== Elected office ==
He was elected at the Argenteuil riding in the 1968 general election and served for only one term, the 28th Canadian Parliament, until 1972. Major did not participate in any further federal elections.

His father-in-law was Thomas Vien who also served as a Member of Parliament as a senator.

He died at Saint-Lambert, Quebec in 1997. He was survived by his wife and two children.
