= Lemuel Cushing =

Lemuel Cushing (April 29, 1806 – May 18, 1875) was a businessman and pioneer in the Ottawa Valley.

He was born in Trois-Rivières, Lower Canada, the son of Job Cushing, who came to the Eastern Townships from the United States. Cushing moved to Montreal with his parents at the age of eight. In 1821, he moved to Vermont for a short time but returned to Chatham Township in Lower Canada after a few months. There he established himself in business in the location which later became the municipality of Cushing. In 1836, Cushing married Catherine Hutchins. Cushing operated a hotel at Caledonia Springs, the site of springs thought to have medicinal properties. He organized a group of volunteers during the Lower Canada Rebellion of 1837 which protected the village of Saint-Eustache and the registry office at Saint-Benoît from pillaging. In 1859, he bought Cushing Island near Portland, Maine. Cushing was mayor of Chatham township from 1861 to 1872 and then warden of Argenteuil County from 1872 until his death three years later.

His son Lemuel was a Montreal lawyer who served briefly in the House of Commons of Canada.
