= George Halsey Perley =

Canadian politician

The Right Honourable Sir George Halsey Perley PC GCMG
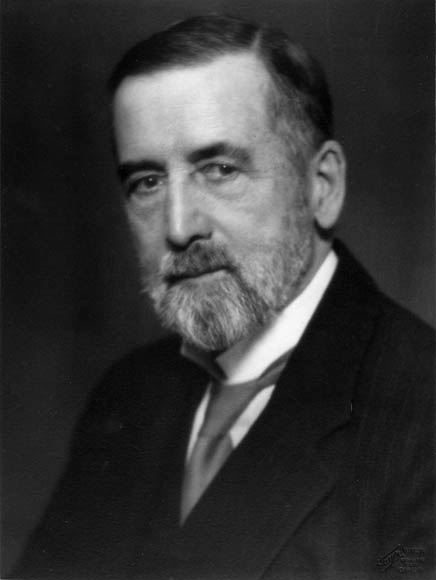

Secretary of State of Canada
- In office 29 June 1926 – 24 September 1926
- Prime Minister: Arthur Meighen
- Preceded by: Ernest Lapointe
- Succeeded by: Fernand Rinfret

Canadian High Commissioner to the United Kingdom
- In office 4 August 1914 – 1922
- Prime Minister: Robert Borden, Arthur Meighen; W.L. Mackenzie King
- Preceded by: Donald Alexander Smith
- Succeeded by: Peter C. Larkin

Minister of Overseas Military Forces
- In office 31 October 1916 – 11 October 1917
- Prime Minister: Robert Laird Borden
- Succeeded by: Albert Edward Kemp

Member of the Canadian Parliament for Argenteuil
- In office 1904–1917
- Preceded by: Thomas Christie Jr.
- Succeeded by: Peter Robert McGibbon
- In office 1925–1938
- Preceded by: Charles Stewart
- Succeeded by: Georges Héon

Personal details
- Born: September 12, 1857 Lebanon, New Hampshire, United States
- Died: January 4, 1938 (aged 80) Ottawa, Ontario, Canada
- Party: Conservative
- Spouse: Annie Hespeler Bowlby
- Education: Harvard University
- Profession: Lumber merchant

Sir George Halsey Perley PC GCMG (September 12, 1857 – January 4, 1938) was an American-born Canadian politician and diplomat.

== Early life ==
Born in Lebanon, New Hampshire, the son of William Goodhue Perley and Mabel E. Ticknor Stevens, Perley was educated at the Ottawa Grammar School, at St. Paul's School in Concord, New Hampshire, and at Harvard University where he graduated with a Bachelor of Arts degree in 1878. Perley became a partner in the Perley & Pattee, a lumber company in which his father was senior partner. After Perley & Pattee dissolved in 1893, Perley became head of G.H. Perley & Co which had mills at Pointe-Calumet, Quebec and vice president of the Hull Lumber Company, Ltd., which is operating largely on the upper Ottawa. For many years, Perley was vice president of the Canada Atlantic Railway Co., president of the Rideau Club and president of the Ottawa Golf Club. Along with the other heirs of his father, he donated his homestead on Wellington Street for the purpose of establishing a hospital and served as vice president of its Board of Management. In 1900, he was chairman of the Ottawa and Hull Fire Relief Fund, and distributed about $1,000,000 among the sufferers by the 1900 Hull–Ottawa fire.

Perley married Annie Hespeler Bowlby in Kitchener, Ontario on 4 June 1884. Perley had two children: Mabel, born 8 July 1885 and died 13 March 1887, and Ethel Lesa, born 16 September 1888.

== Politics ==
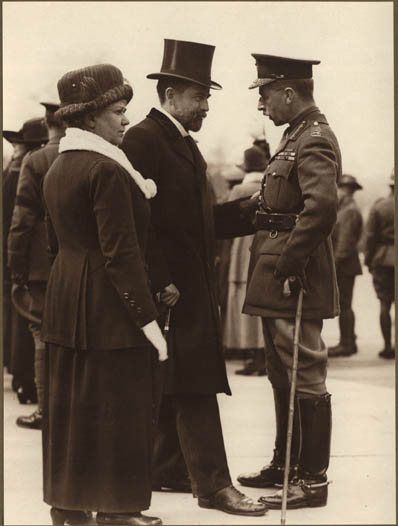
Perley and his wife inspecting Lt. Gen. Sir Richard Turner during World War I

He was first elected to the House of Commons of Canada as the Conservative MP for Argenteuil in 1904, having failed to defeat Mr. W. C. Edwards for the seat in Russell County during the election of 1900. Perley served as High Commissioner to the United Kingdom and Minister of the Overseas Military Forces in the World War I government of Sir Robert Borden. He did not run for re-election in the 1917 federal election in order to concentrate on his duties in London. He returned to the House of Commons in the 1925 federal election and subsequently served as Secretary of State for Canada in the short-lived 1926 government of Arthur Meighen and then as Minister without Portfolio in the government of R. B. Bennett following the 1930 federal election. He was re-elected in the 1935 federal election which also saw the defeat of Bennett's government, and remained an MP until his death in 1938.

== Electoral record ==
3 December 1902
Party	Candidate	Votes	%	±%
Liberal	Thomas Christie, Jr.	1,261	54.10	
Conservative	George Halsey Perley	1,070	45.90	

1935 Canadian federal election: Argenteuil
Party	Candidate	Votes	%	±%
Conservative	George Halsey Perley	4,467	49.83	
Liberal	Joseph-Louis-Lorenzo Legault	4,290	47.86	
Reconstruction	Pierre-Albert-Arthur Fortin	207	2.31	

1930 Canadian federal election: Argenteuil
Party	Candidate	Votes	%	±%
Conservative	George Halsey Perley	4,709	54.45	
Liberal	Joseph-Louis-Lorenzo Legault	3,940	45.55	

1926 Canadian federal election: Argenteuil
Party	Candidate	Votes	%	±%
Conservative	George Halsey Perley	4,094	51.51	
Liberal	Joseph-Louis-Lorenzo Legault	3,854	48.49	

1925 Canadian federal election: Argenteuil
Party	Candidate	Votes	%	±%
Conservative	George Halsey Perley	3,921	51.31	
Liberal	Joseph-Louis-Lorenzo Legault	3,721	48.69	

1911 Canadian federal election: Argenteuil
Party	Candidate	Votes	%	±%
Conservative	George Halsey Perley	1,824	59.78	
Liberal	Agenor Henry Tanner	1,227	40.22	

1908 Canadian federal election: Argenteuil
Party	Candidate	Votes	%	±%
Conservative	George Halsey Perley	1,587	54.44	
Liberal	Peter Robert McGibbon	1,328	45.56	

1904 Canadian federal election: Argenteuil
Party	Candidate	Votes	%	±%
Conservative	George Halsey Perley	1,516	53.08	
Liberal	Thomas Christie Jr.	1,340	46.92	

1900 Canadian federal election: Russell
Party	Candidate	Votes
Liberal	William Cameron Edwards	3,089
Conservative	George Halsey Perley	2,523
Source: open.canada.ca

Parliament of Canada
Preceded by Thomas Christie, Jr.	Member of Parliament for Argenteuil; 1904–1917	Succeeded by Peter Robert McGibbon
Preceded by Charles Stewart	Member of Parliament for Argenteuil; 1925–1938	Succeeded by Georges-Henri Héon
Political offices
Preceded by Ernest Lapointe	Secretary of State of Canada; 1926	Succeeded by Fernand Rinfret
Diplomatic posts
Preceded by Donald Alexander Smith	Canadian High Commissioner to the United Kingdom of Great Britain and Northern Ireland; 1914–1922	Succeeded by Peter Charles Larkin
Political offices
Preceded by None	Minister of Overseas Military Forces; 1916-1917	Succeeded by Albert Edward Kemp
