= Mylène Freeman =

Canadian politician

Member of Parliament for Argenteuil—Papineau—Mirabel
- In office May 2, 2011 – October 19, 2015
- Preceded by: Mario Laframboise
- Succeeded by: riding abolished

Personal details
- Born: March 7, 1989 (age 37) Stouffville, Ontario
- Party: New Democratic Party; Projet Montréal
- Education: University of Virginia; McGill University

Mylène Freeman (born March 7, 1989) is a former Canadian politician who was the New Democratic Party (NDP) Member of Parliament for the riding of Argenteuil—Papineau—Mirabel in Quebec. She was elected in the 2011 Canadian federal election after defeating incumbent Mario Laframboise of the Bloc Québécois.

== Biography ==
Born in Stouffville, Ontario, she is fluent in both French and English. She grew up fluently bilingual; she is the daughter of an Irish Canadian father and a French Canadian mother.

She holds a Bachelor of Arts from McGill University, where she studied political theory. She was co-president of the university's New Democratic Party student group and co-ordinator of the university's Women in House program, which has young women shadow female MPs in hopes of fostering their interest in getting involved in politics.

In the 2009 Montreal municipal election, Freeman stood on behalf of Projet Montréal in Outremont as a candidate for borough councillor in Claude-Ryan.

Freeman defeated Bloc Québécois MP Mario Laframboise by 8,000 votes in Argenteuil—Papineau—Mirabel in the 2011 federal election. She was one of five McGill students, alongside Charmaine Borg, Laurin Liu, Matthew Dubé and Jamie Nicholls, elected to Parliament in the 2011 election following the NDP's unexpected mid-campaign surge in Quebec. In 2015, NDP leader Tom Mulcair named her to the shadow cabinet as critic for the status of women. She succeeded Niki Ashton, who was reassigned to be critic for Aboriginal affairs.

Amid a drop in support for the NDP in the 2015 election, Dubé was re-elected while Freeman and the other three were defeated. Following her defeat, Freeman went on to pursue doctoral studies at the University of Virginia.

== Electoral record ==
2015 Canadian federal election: Mirabel
Party	Candidate	Votes	%	±%	Expenditures
Bloc Québécois	Simon Marcil	18,710	31.49	+0.48	–
New Democratic	Mylène Freeman	17,873	30.08	-19.47	–
Liberal	Karl Trudel	15,514	26.11	+18.36	–
Conservative	Gordon Ferguson	6,020	10.13	+0.91	–
Green	Jocelyn Gifford	1,301	2.19	+0.17	–
Total valid votes/Expense limit		59,418	100.0		$225,548.06
Total rejected ballots		1,178	–	–	
Turnout		60,596	–	–	
Eligible voters		87,622			
Bloc Québécois gain from New Democratic		Swing		+9.98	
Source: Elections Canada

2011 Canadian federal election: Argenteuil—Papineau—Mirabel
Party	Candidate	Votes	%	±%	Expenditures
New Democratic	Mylène Freeman	25,801	44.24	+31.84	$0.00
Bloc Québécois	Mario Laframboise	16,876	28.94	-19.16	$77,499.72
Liberal	Daniel Fox	7,175	12.30	-5.85	$67,191.80
Conservative	Yvan Patry	6,497	11.14	-6.29	$30,881.78
Green	Stephen Matthews	1,506	2.58	-1.16	$888.62
Independent	Michel Daniel Guibord	342	0.59	–	$1,904.02
Marxist–Leninist	Christian-Simon Ferlatte	123	0.21	+0.03	$0.00
Total valid vote/Expense limit		58,320	100.00		

Source: Elections Canada
