= James Crocket Wilson =

Canadian politician

Member of the Canadian Parliament for Argenteuil
- In office 1887–1891
- Preceded by: John Abbott
- Succeeded by: Thomas Christie

Personal details
- Born: July 19, 1841 near Rasharkin, County Antrim, Ireland
- Died: October 8, 1899 (aged 58) Montreal, Quebec, Canada
- Resting place: Crescent Street Presbyterian Church
- Party: Liberal-Conservative

James Crocket Wilson (July 19, 1841 – October 8, 1899) was a Canadian businessman and politician in the province of Quebec.

== Life ==
Born near Rasharkin, County Antrim, Ireland, the son of Samuel Wilson and Elizabeth Crocket, Wilson emigrated to Montreal with his parents in 1842. He studied at the McGill Normal School and became a teacher in Beauharnois in 1859. In 1862, he became a clerk in a bookstore in Belleville, Upper Canada and soon worked in press agency at Toronto. In 1863, he became a clerk for a New York publisher. He married Jeanie Kilgour in 1865 and moved back to Montreal with her in 1867 where he was employed as a cashier and bookkeeper for a paper manufacturer. In 1870, he started his own business manufacturing paper bags. He soon built a paper-mill in Lachute, Quebec to supply his factory. The mill proved to be very successful and was expanded to become one of the largest paper factories in Canada.

Politically, he was elected to the Montreal City Council in 1880 and was re-elected by acclamation in 1883. He was elected to the House of Commons of Canada for the electoral district of Argenteuil in the 1887 federal election. A Liberal-Conservative, he did not run in 1891.

He died in Montreal in 1899.
