= Daniel Ratthé =

Canadian politician

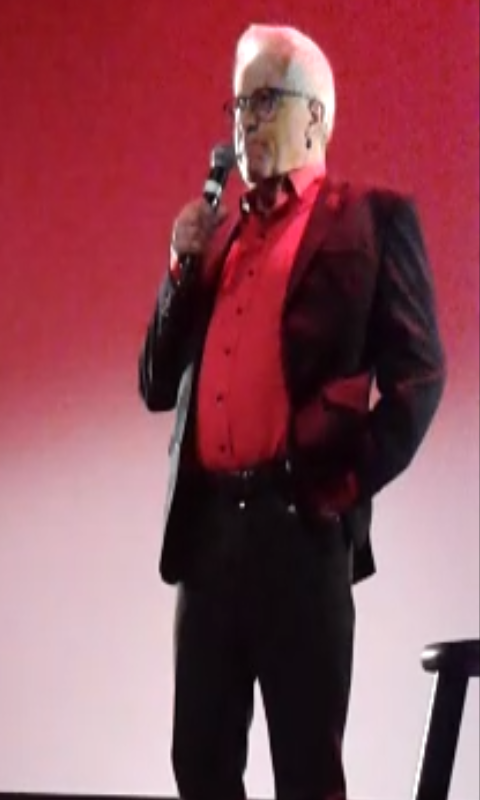
- Daniel Ratthé

MNA for Blainville
- In office 2008–2014
- Preceded by: Pierre Gingras
- Succeeded by: Mario Laframboise

Personal details
- Born: 8 June 1956 (age 70) Chicoutimi, Quebec
- Party: Parti Québécois (2008–2011); Independent (2011); CAQ (2011–2013); Independent (2013–2014)

Daniel Ratthé (born 8 June 1956) is a politician in the Canadian province of Quebec, who was elected to represent the riding of Blainville in the National Assembly of Quebec in the 2008 provincial election. He is an Independent MNA and a former member of the CAQ as well as a former member of the Parti Québécois.

From 1976 to 1984, Ratthé worked for various positions at several radio stations in Laval including CFGL-FM (now Rythme FM) and CIMO-FM. He later worked for six years for Sony Canada as the sales representative for Eastern Canada in the Media and Recording department and from 1990 to 1997 as the regional director of sales. Since 1997, he was the national director of sales and business development for CEDROM-SNi Inc.

Ratthé was also a municipal councilor for the City of Blainville and obtained a college degree in humanities in 1997 at College Montmorency in Laval.

Ratthé defeated former Blainville mayor Pierre Gingras in the 2008 elections for the MNA seat of Blainville. In November 2011, he was expelled from the PQ caucus by Pauline Marois, and later that year on 19 December he joined the CAQ.
