= Thomas Christie Jr. =

Canadian politician

Thomas Christie Jr. (1855 - 2 February 1934) was a pharmacist and federal politician in Quebec.

Born in Lachute, Canada East, in the Laurentians, the son of Thomas Christie and Catherine McMartin, he was elected to the House of Commons of Canada as the Liberal MP representing Argenteuil in a 1902 by-election. He succeeded his father who had been the riding's MP until his death earlier that year.

Christie was the first pharmacist in Lachute. He was unable to hold the riding in the 1904 federal election when he was defeated by Conservative candidate George Halsey Perley. He attempted to regain the seat 17 years later in the 1921 federal election, this time running as a conservative, but was again defeated. He died in Lachute at the age of 79.
