= Pierre Gingras =

Canadian politician

MNA for Blainville
- In office April 25, 2007 – November 5, 2008
- Preceded by: Richard Legendre
- Succeeded by: Daniel Ratthé

Mayor of Blainville, Quebec
- In office 1993–2005
- Preceded by: Onil Charron
- Succeeded by: François Cantin

Personal details
- Born: April 21, 1952 (age 74) Saint-Sauveur-d'Almaville, Quebec
- Party: Action democratique du Quebec
- Spouse: Christiane Lefebvre

Pierre Gingras (born April 21, 1952) is a politician from Quebec, Canada. He was an Action démocratique du Québec Member of the National Assembly for the electoral district of Blainville from 2007 to 2008.

== Background ==
From 1993 to 2005, Gingras served as mayor of Blainville and was a councillor from 1989 to 1993 and the leader of the Civil action municipal political party for 14 years. He worked at the Commission scolaire des Mille-Îles for nine, and in the printing industry. He belonged to several economic committees in the Laurentides region and was president of the Quebec committee of the Organisation Mondiale de la Famille and president of the North American branch of that organization.

== Member of the Provincial Legislature ==
Gingras was first elected to the National Assembly in the 2007 election with 42% of the vote. Parti Québécois incumbent Richard Legendre finished second with 33% of the vote. On March 29, 2007, Gingras was appointed Chairman of the Official Opposition Caucus.

== Federal politics ==
He ran for the Liberal Party of Canada in the 2004 Canadian federal election in the riding of Terrebonne—Blainville.

He campaigned on behalf of local Conservative candidate Claude Carignan during the federal election of 2008. Carignan finished a distant second against Bloc Québécois candidate Luc Desnoyers in the district of Rivière-des-Mille-Îles.
