= Richard Legendre =

Canadian tennis player

- Born: January 19, 1953 (age 73)
- Occupations: Tennis player; Politician
- Years active: 1972-1973

Richard Legendre (born January 19, 1953, in Montmagny, Quebec) is a former professional tennis player and politician in Quebec, Canada.

== Tennis ==
Legendre was born in Montmagny, Quebec. He once represented Canada at the Davis Cup and had a career-high tennis ranking of World No. 232 in singles (December 1978). He played NCAA collegiate tennis at Florida State University in 1972 and 1973.

== Politics ==
He was the Quebec minister of sports in Bernard Landry's cabinet, after being elected as a Member of the National Assembly of Quebec for the riding of Blainville in 2001. In 2005 he was a candidate in the Parti Québécois's leadership election, a bid notably supported by former Quebec minister François Legault and sprinter and olympic medalist Bruny Surin. Legendre placed third with 7.5% of the vote.

In the 2007 elections, Legendre was surprisingly defeated by the Action democratique du Quebec's Pierre Gingras who was a former mayor for the City of Blainville. The party nearly won every seat in the lower Laurentians region. Legendre was Vice-President of Montreal Impact; he was nominated on August 13, 2007.

He's now teaching at HEC Montreal, and regularly appears on TVA Sports morning show Les Partants commenting on economic sports news.

== Electoral record (partial) ==
Quebec provincial by-election, October 1, 2001: Blainville
Party	Candidate	Votes	%
Parti Québécois	Richard Legendre	10,323	46.25
Liberal	Jocelyne Roch	8,990	40.28
Action démocratique	Michel Paulette	2,186	9.79
Bloc Pot	Sylvain Mainville	384	1.72
Alternative progressiste	Thérèse Hamel	339	1.52
Independent	Régent Millette	97	0.44
Total valid votes		22,319	98.63
Rejected and declined votes		309	1.37
Turnout		22,628	48.58
Electors on the lists		46,581	
Source: Elections Quebec

== See also ==
- 2005 Parti Québécois leadership election
- Quebec sovereignty movement

National Assembly of Quebec
Preceded by Céline Signori (PQ)	MNA, District of Blainville; 2001–2007	Succeeded by Pierre Gingras (ADQ)
