= Peter Robert McGibbon =

Canadian politician

Peter Robert McGibbon (14 January 1854 – 18 December 1921) was a Canadian lumberjack and federal politician in Quebec.

== Biography ==
McGibbon was born in Chatham in the Laurentians region of Canada East, the son of Findlay McGibbon, was educated at the Lachute Academy and established himself at Lachute. In 1876, he married Margaret Elizabeth McArthur.

He first ran for the House of Commons of Canada as a Liberal candidate in Argenteuil but was defeated in the 1908 federal election by George Halsey Perley of the Conservatives.

His second attempt at the riding was in the 1917 federal election during the Conscription Crisis of 1917 when he ran as a Laurier Liberal and was elected. McGibbon was re-elected as a Liberal in the 1921 federal election but died in Lachute shortly after his victory.

His seat was filled by former Premier of Alberta Charles Stewart, after Stewart joined the Cabinet of William Lyon Mackenzie King. Stewart ran in Quebec because the Liberals had won no ridings in Alberta in the previous general election.
