= Charles Sirois =

Canadian businessman (born 1954)

Charles Sirois CM CQ
- Born: 1954 (age 71–72); Chicoutimi, Quebec, Canada
- Education: Université de Sherbrooke; Université Laval
- Occupation: Businessman
- Political party: Coalition Avenir Québec

Charles Sirois, CM CQ (French pronunciation: [ʃaʁl(ə) siʁwa]; born 1954) is a Canadian businessman. He is the founder, controlling shareholder, chairman and CEO of Telesystem Ltd., a Canadian private equity firm. Effective from March 1, 2017, he has been the CEO and chairman of OnMobile Global Ltd, India.

In 2011, with fellow businessman François Legault he co-founded a centre-right autonomist political party in Quebec, the Coalition Avenir Québec (CAQ). Legault would go on to become Premier of Quebec in 2018.

== Early life and education ==
Born in Chicoutimi, Quebec, Sirois earned a bachelor's degree in Finance from the Université de Sherbrooke and a master's degree in Finance from Université Laval. He is the father of François-Charles Sirois and grandfather of Maxime Sirois.

== Business career ==
Sirois has had a long career in corporate management. He is currently a director of the Canadian Imperial Bank of Commerce, Cossette Communication Group and Orchestre Symphonique de Montreal. He led BCE Mobile Communications from 1988 to 1990 as its chairman and CEO. Subsequently, he was chairman and CEO of Teleglobe, the leading provider of international long-distance and broadband services in Canada. He also served as chairman of Telesystem International Wireless, and founded and was chairman of Microcell Telecommunications, a GSM cellular provider in Canada best known for its Fido brand name. He was also a member of the G8 Dot Force, of the National Broadband Task Force, and was a founding member of the Washington-based Global Information Infrastructure Commission (GIIC).

Sirois is known within investment circles for his purchase of Excel Communications in 1998. Excel, which was a reseller of residential long-distance services, relied on door-to-door sales and multi-level marketing. While Sirois was able to sell Teleglobe to Bell Canada in 2000 at a price of $6.5 billion, the subsequent bursting of the internet bubble and telecom bust forced Teleglobe into bankruptcy in 2002 and the writedown of $2.1 billion of Excel.

Sirois is one of the founding partners of Enablis and has served as its chairman and chief executive officer from inception.

Sirois had a net worth of C$1.2 billion in 2015.

== Honours ==
In 1994, he was made a member of the Order of Canada in recognition for being "a visionary in the area of intercontinental communications". In 1998, he was made a Knight of the National Order of Quebec.

He holds honorary doctorates from Université du Québec à Montréal, University of Ottawa, Concordia University, Université Laval and the École de technologie supérieure.

== Published work ==
In 1995, he published a book on the information highway entitled "The Medium and the Muse" (ISBN 0-88645-175-2). In his second book, published in June 2000, "Organic Management: Creating a Culture of Innovation" (ISBN 0-00-200053-9), Sirois shares his management philosophy, along with his vision of the new economy.

Business positions
Preceded by Bill Etherington	Chair of the Board of CIBC; February 26, 2009– April 23, 2015	Succeeded by John Manley
