= Lemuel Cushing Jr. =

Canadian politician

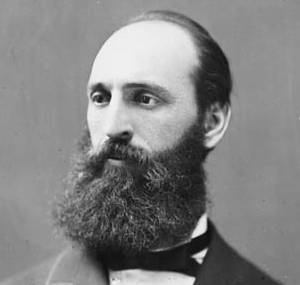
Lemuel Cushing Source: Library and Archives Canada

Lemuel Cushing (1842 – March 1, 1881) was a lawyer and politician in Quebec. He represented Argenteuil in the House of Commons of Canada from 1874 to 1875 as a Liberal member.

He was born in Chatham, Canada East, the son of Lemuel Cushing and Catherine Hutchins, was educated at McGill University and was called to the Lower Canada bar in 1865. He practised law in Montreal. In 1869, Cushing married Ellen Myra Macdougall. He was president of the Montreal Y.M.C.A. from 1869 to 1870. Cushing was defeated by John Abbott in the 1874 federal election. After Abbott was unseated after an appeal, Cushing won the subsequent by-election in October 1874. The results of the by-election were declared void after an appeal and Thomas Christie was elected in December 1875.

In 1877, he published The Genealogy of the Cushing Family.

Cushing died in Montreal at the age of 39.

== Electoral record ==
By-election: On Mr. Abbott being unseated, on petition:

6 October 1874
Party	Candidate	Votes	%	±%
Liberal	Lemuel Cushing, Jr.	840	53.30	
Unknown	William Owens	736	46.70	

1874 Canadian federal election: Argenteuil
Party	Candidate	Votes	%	±%
Liberal-Conservative	John Abbott	731	50.14	
Unknown	Lemuel Cushing Jr.	727	49.86	
Source: Canadian Elections Database
