= Céline Signori =

Canadian politician

Member of the Quebec National Assembly for Blainville
- In office 1994–2001
- Preceded by: first member
- Succeeded by: Richard Legendre

Personal details
- Born: February 11, 1938 (age 88) Saint-Jean-sur-Richelieu, Quebec, Canada
- Party: Parti Québécois
- Occupation: teacher, mayor

Céline Signori (born February 11, 1938) is a former Canadian politician. Signori was a two-term member of the National Assembly of Quebec.

== Early life ==
Signori was born in Saint-Jean-sur-Richelieu, Quebec in 1938 to Gustave Signori, a local teacher and principal, and Anne-Marie Pelchat. Signori studied nursing at l'École de puériculture de Notre-Dame-de-Liesse, a Church-owned school based at an orphanage in Saint-Laurent, Quebec. She served for fifteen years as a neonatal nurse at hospitals in her hometown of Saint-Jean-sur-Richelieu, Hôpital Charles-LeMoyne in Longueuil, and the hospital in Fort Smith, Northwest Territories.

Signori made a career change in the early 1980s, becoming a real estate agent with Royal LePage and becoming more involved in women's issues. She served as President of the Federation of Québec Associations of single parents from 1985-1992 and as President of the Fédération des femmes du Québec from 1992-1994. As President of the Federation of Québec Associations of single parents, she campaigned for automatic collection of child support.

== Member of the National Assembly ==
Céline Signori was first elected to the National Assembly in the 1994 election, in which the Parti Québécois formed the government. She was re-elected in 1998 but resigned in 2001 after being appointed to the Commission municipale du Québec, where she served until her retirement in 2006.

== Later life ==
In retirement, Signori remained involved in women's issues, speaking at the 20th-anniversary celebration of the Centre Rayons de femmes in Thérèse-De Blainville, which she helped form as an MNA.
