= Vincent Drouin =

Canadian politician (1932–1979)

Member of Parliament for Argenteuil—Deux-Montagnes
- In office June 1962 – September 1965

Personal details
- Born: 29 March 1932 Saint-Benoît, Quebec
- Died: 1 September 1979 (aged 47)
- Party: Liberal
- Profession: lawyer

Vincent Drouin (29 March 1932 – 1 September 1979) was a Liberal party member of the House of Commons of Canada. He was a lawyer by career.

== Career ==
He was first elected at the Argenteuil—Deux-Montagnes riding in the 1962 general election and re-elected there in 1963. Drouin was defeated after his second term, the 26th Canadian Parliament, in the 1965 election by Roger Régimbal of the Progressive Conservative party.
