= Philippe Valois =

Canadian politician

Member of Parliament for Argenteuil—Deux-Montagnes
- In office June 1949 – February 1958

Personal details
- Born: 27 March 1907 Lachute, Quebec, Canada
- Died: 31 July 1986 (aged 79) Lachute, Quebec, Canada
- Party: Liberal
- Spouse(s): Fernande Dubeau m. 9 December 1939
- Profession: Lawyer

Philippe Valois (French pronunciation: [filip valwa]; 27 March 1907 – 31 July 1986) was a Liberal party member of the House of Commons of Canada. He was a lawyer by career.

Born in Lachute, Quebec, Valois was educated at the Seminaire de Joliette and the Université de Montréal, attained Bachelor of Arts and Bachelor of Laws degrees.

He was first elected at the Argenteuil—Deux-Montagnes riding in the 1949 general election then re-elected there for successive terms in 1949, 1953, and 1957. After completing his final federal term, the 23rd Canadian Parliament, Valois did not seek further re-election.
