= Coalition Avenir Québec =

Canadian provincial political party

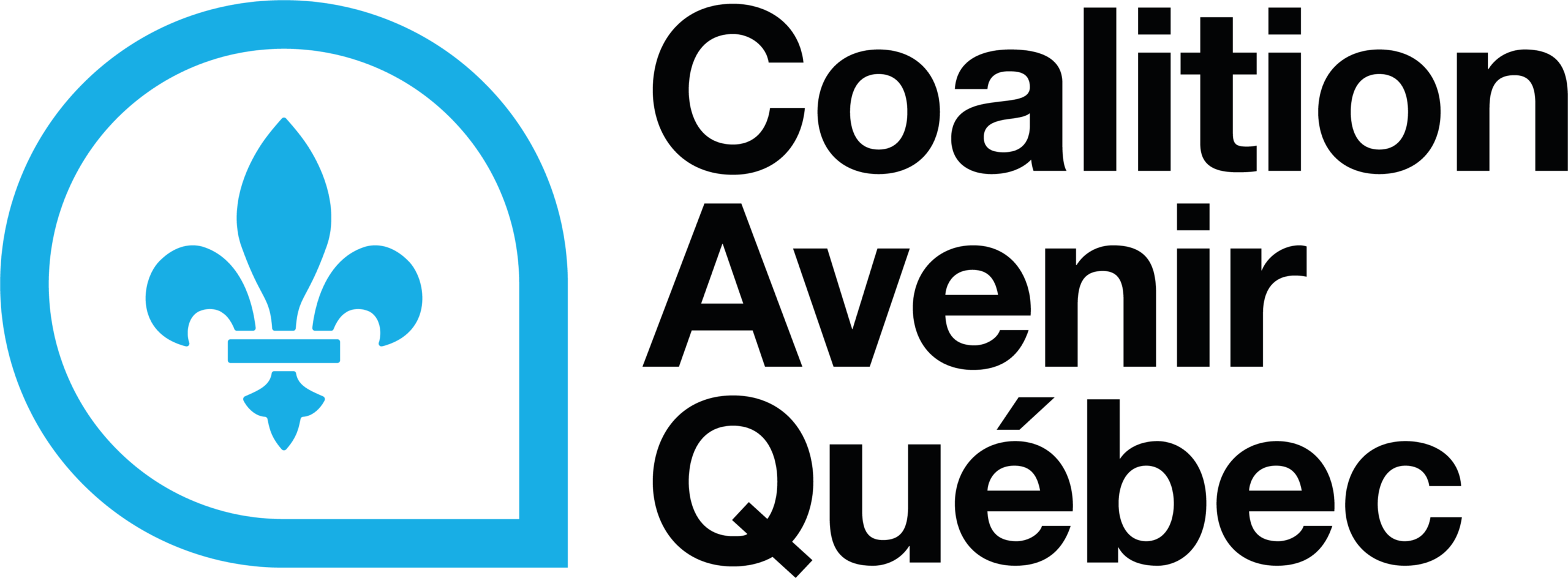
- Abbreviation: CAQ
- Leader: Mathieu Lévesque (interim)
- President: Sarah Beaumier
- Founders: François Legault; Charles Sirois
- Founded: 4 November 2011; 15 years ago
- Merger of: Action démocratique du Québec
- Split from: Parti Québécois; Quebec Liberal Party
- Headquarters: 1260 Rue Mill, Montreal, Quebec; H3K 2B4
- Membership (2026): ▲20,576
- Ideology: Quebec nationalism; Quebec federalism (Autonomism); Conservatism (Canadian); Right-wing populism
- Political position: Centre-right to right-wing
- Colours: Blue
- Slogan: Avançons ('Let's Move Forward')
- Seats in the National Assembly: 0 / 127

Website
- www.coalitionavenirquebec.org

The Coalition Avenir Québec (Canadian French: [kɔalisjɔ̃ avniʁ kebɛk], lit. 'Future Quebec Coalition', CAQ) is a Quebec nationalist, autonomist, secularist (Note: Despite the party's secularist policies, its co-founder and first leader, François Legault, is a non-practicing Catholic, who has also stated that "All French Canadians are Catholic".) and conservative provincial political party in Quebec.

The party was founded by former Parti Québécois (PQ) cabinet minister, François Legault, and businessman Charles Sirois in 2011. Not long after its formation, the Action démocratique du Québec (ADQ) merged into the CAQ. Party membership includes both Quebec nationalists and federalists. The party has stated that it will never endorse a referendum on sovereignty; it also does not explicitly support Quebec independence, but will seek more autonomy within Canada if necessary.

In 2018, the CAQ won a majority of seats in the National Assembly, allowing it to form a government for the first time under the leadership of Legault. It increased its majority in the 2022 election. The Legault government passed Bill 21 on secularism, strengthened French-language laws through Bill 96, reduced immigration levels, reformed school governance, implemented measures to combat COVID-19, sought to promote economic growth, and saw controversies related to its handling of public services, minority rights, and religious freedom. Legault was succeeded as leader and premier by Christine Fréchette in 2026. The party lost all its seats in that year's general election, and Fréchette resigned as leader the following day.

Members and supporters of the party are referred to as caquistes, derived from the French pronunciation of the party's initials. However, the party has requested that the term coalisés be used instead.

== History ==
=== Foundation and 2012 provincial election ===
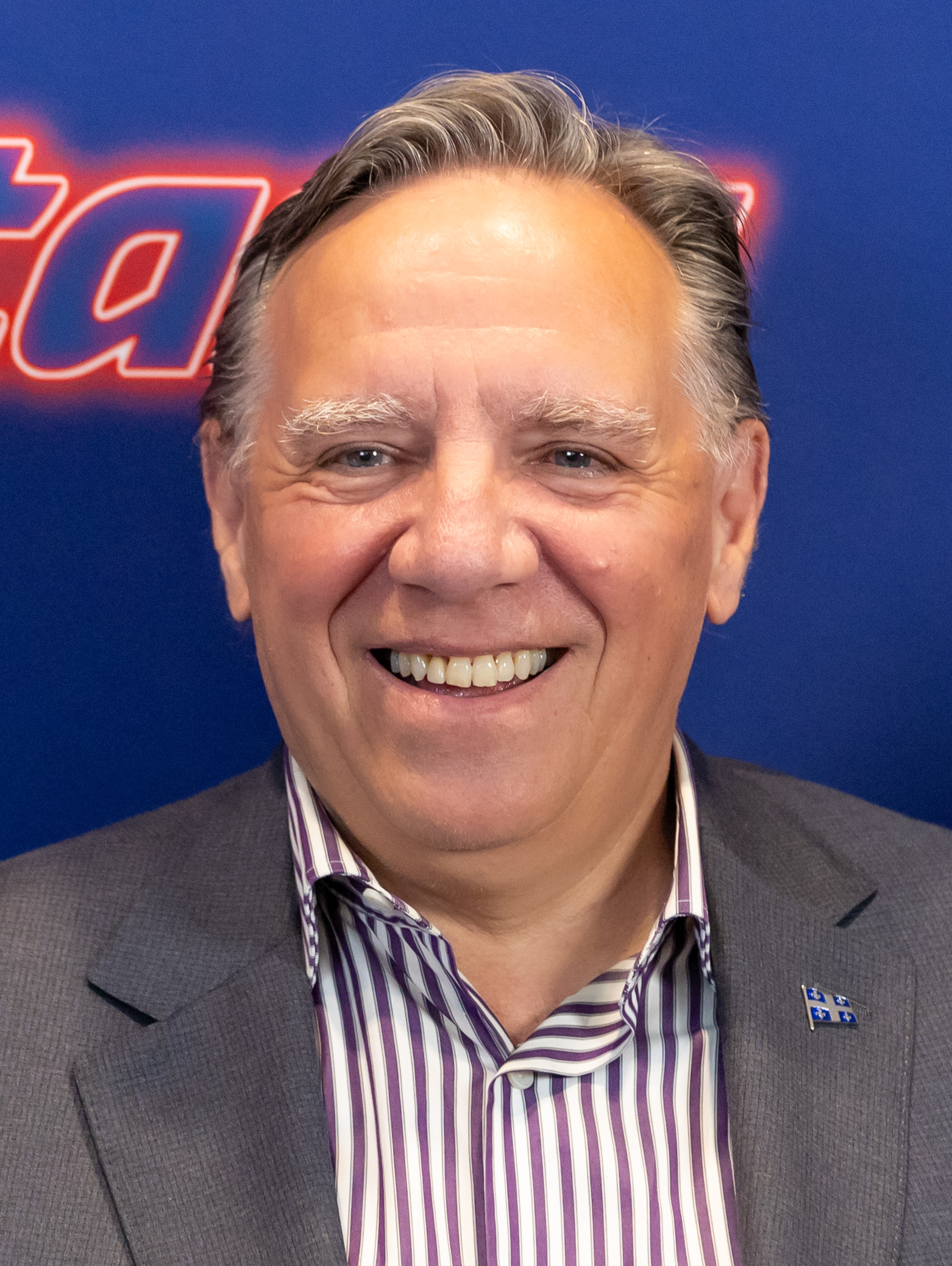
Former Premier Legault.

In February 2011, François Legault and Charles Sirois held a press conference to announce the formation of a movement called the Coalition pour l'avenir du Québec (lit. 'Coalition for the future of Quebec').

In September 2011, the CAQ began discussions with the ADQ on the possibility of a merger between the two groups. The two parties were very similar ideologically.

On 14 November 2011, Legault held a press conference to launch the movement as a political party under the slightly modified name of Coalition Avenir Québec, unveiling a new logo at the same time. The actual registration of the party with the Chief Electoral Officer of Quebec had already taken place on 4 November. The party was registered with the Director-General of Elections in Quebec under the name Coalition avenir Québec – L'équipe François Legault (lit. 'Team François Legault').

On 13 December 2011, the CAQ and the ADQ announced an agreement in principle to merge, pending final approval with the ADQ membership.

On 19 December 2011, two former PQ MNAs (Benoit Charette and Daniel Ratthé) and two former ADQ MNAs (Éric Caire and Marc Picard) who had earlier left their respective parties to sit as independents announced that they were joining the CAQ, becoming the new party's first sitting members. In January 2012, PQ MNA François Rebello switched party affiliation to the CAQ, becoming its fifth sitting member.

On 21 January 2012, the results of the ADQ's mail-in vote were announced: of the 54% of members who voted, 70% approved the merger with the CAQ. The ADQ's four remaining MNAs—Sylvie Roy of Lotbinière, Janvier Grondin of Beauce-Nord, François Bonnardel of Shefford, and leader Gérard Deltell of Chauveau—joined the CAQ, boosting its caucus to nine.

On 23 January 2012, it was announced that the CAQ's first president, Dominique Anglade, would also be a candidate for the party in the 2012 election. She would later serve as leader of the Quebec Liberal Party. On 4 September 2012, the CAQ won 19 seats in the 2012 provincial election. Legault himself was elected as an MNA from L'Assomption.

=== 2014 provincial election and aftermath ===
In the 2014 provincial election held on 7 April, the CAQ won 22 seats, a gain of three seats. The TVA-sponsored second televised debate was noted as a turning point in the campaign, and party leader François Legault's performance reflected positively on the CAQ's standing. Therefore, early voting results revealed a disastrous outcome for the party, while ballots cast on Election Day were much more favourable.

Also, overall returns marked a significant geographic shift in the CAQ electoral base. In the Capitale-Nationale area, reputed for its conservative leaning and the influence of its talk-radio hosts, the Quebec Liberal Party won four of the six seats previously held by the CAQ. A strategic vote of the anti-PQ electorate, as well as a pledge by Legault to spend no public money on projects dear to Mayor Régis Labeaume, such as the construction of a $97.5 million covered ice rink, the completion of the $60 million theatre Le Diamant, promoted by Robert Lepage, and the $20 million revitalization of the French colonial era new barracks, are possible causes for the backlash. However, the CAQ losses in the Capitale-Nationale area were largely compensated for with a significant breakthrough in the "450 area" (Laurentides, Lanaudière and Montérégie), where it ended up with seven more seats. Meanwhile, the CAQ support in Chaudière-Appalaches and Centre-du-Québec remained steady.

On 15 August 2014, CAQ MNA for Lévis Christian Dubé resigned his seat to take a job at the Caisse de dépôt et placement.

The subsequent 20 October 2014 by-election was won by CAQ candidate François Paradis with 47 percent of the popular vote.

Following much speculation, Gérard Deltell announced on 7 April 2015 that he would be running for the federal Conservative Party of Canada in the riding of Louis-Saint-Laurent in the upcoming 2015 federal election. His resignation as MNA for Chauveau took effect the same day.

On 26 August 2015, CAQ MNA Sylvie Roy resigned to sit as an independent following personal issues with party leadership.

On 2 October 2017, Geneviève Guilbault won a byelection in the riding of Louis-Hébert that had long been held by the Quebec Liberal Party, winning over 51 percent of the vote. She would later become deputy premier of Quebec.

=== Legault government (2018–2026) ===
On 1 October 2018, the CAQ (as Coalition Avenir Quebec – L’Équipe Francois Legault) won 74 seats, a gain of 53 seats compared to their performance in 2014, propelling them from third place to a strong majority government. The CAQ won 37.4 percent of the vote, four percentage points fewer than what the Liberals tallied four years earlier, and the lowest vote share on record for a party winning an outright majority. However, the CAQ dominated its traditional heartlands and also scored sweeps or near-sweeps in Mauricie, Estrie, Lanaudière, Montérégie, the Laurentides and northern Quebec. The first-past-the-post system awards power solely based on seats won, making it possible for a party to run up its seat count if it has large concentrations of support in certain areas, as opposed to a large number of votes. This is especially true of provincial elections in Quebec, which have historically seen large discrepancies between raw vote and seat count. In the CAQ's case, its support was concentrated enough in the regions it dominated that it was able to net a strong majority of 11 seats.

This marked the first time since the 1966 election, which was won by the now-defunct Union Nationale, that a party other than the Quebec Liberals or the Parti Québécois formed government in Quebec. It was also the first time since then that a centre-right party had won government in the province.

The CAQ picked up support from several former PQ supporters who had come to believe there was no realistic chance of becoming independent from Canada. For instance, Patrick Légaré, a longtime PQ supporter from the longstanding sovereigntist stronghold of Terrebonne, told The Guardian that he decided to vote for the CAQ because he believed "the dream of a separate Quebec is dead." His main concern was finding "someone who can beat the Liberals–and it isn't the PQ." As it turned out, most of the CAQ's gains came at the expense of the PQ. The CAQ took dozens of ridings that had been in PQ hands for four decades or more, some falling by landslide margins. One such riding was Terrebonne, which is largely coextensive with its namesake city. It had been held by a "Péquiste" for all but one term since 1976, although the CAQ had narrowed the gap in the last two elections. In 2018, however, the CAQ took the seat by a margin of almost 14 points.

The CAQ then took the seat vacated by the resignation of former premier Philippe Couillard in a by-election held on 10 December 2018, increasing its total to 75 seats.

In December 2019, the party won the by-election in Jean-Talon and in April 2022 won the by-election in Marie-Victorin, both of which had been Liberal and Parti Québécois strongholds, raising its seat total to 76.

The party won another majority government in the 2022 elections, raising their seat count to 90.

Since late 2023, the Legault government has been one of the most unpopular provincial governments in Canada, suffering from poor opinion polling throughout the 43rd Quebec Legislature. The party also lost the Jean-Talon, Terrebonne, Arthabaska, and Chicoutimi by-elections to the Parti Québécois, while losing 8 other MNAs due to either expulsions or resignations from caucus. On 14 January 2026, Legault announced his pending resignation as leader of the CAQ and premier of Quebec; the 2026 Coalition Avenir Québec leadership election, the party's first, was on 12 April to elect a successor.

=== Fréchette leadership and electoral wipeout (2026) ===
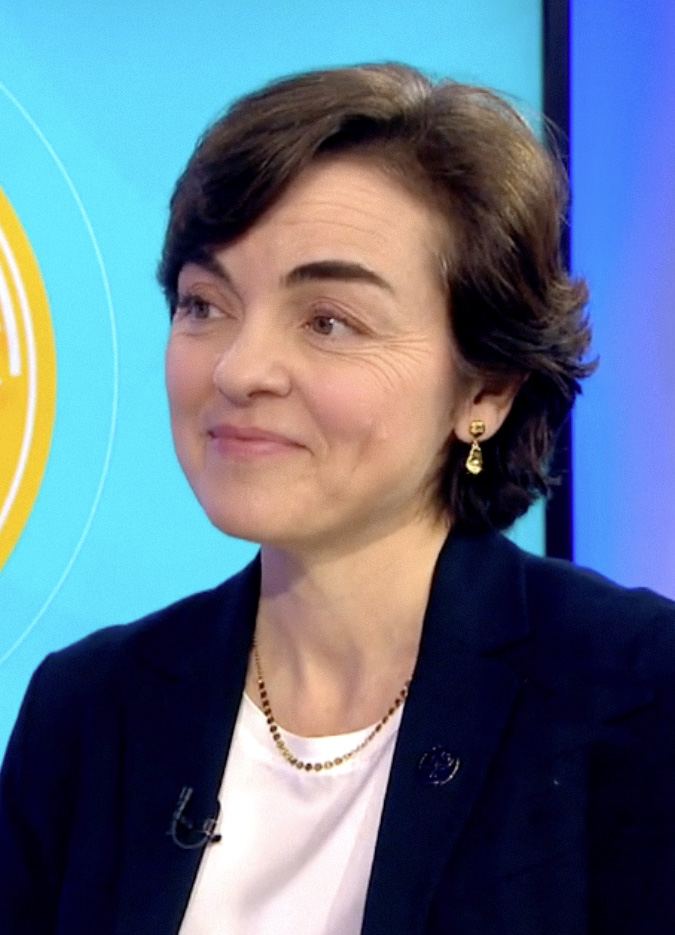
Premier Fréchette.

In the leadership election, former Cabinet minister Christine Fréchette was elected CAQ leader, defeating Bernard Drainville with 57.9% of the vote. Fréchette's campaign mostly focused on economic issues, while Drainville focused on identity and immigration issues.

She is the party's first female leader. She appointed Ian Lafrenière as deputy premier in her ministry, succeeding Éric Girard as vice-president of the executive council.

Prior to the 2026 Quebec general election, the party changed its logo and official name for the election to Équipe Christine Frechette – Coalition Avenir Quebec. Public opinion polls showed a rise in support for the CAQ on Fréchette becoming leader: after collapsing towards 10% at the time of Legault's resignation, support for the CAQ rose steadily during the summer, peaking in early September, when poll aggregator Qc125 (338Canada) projected a 25% vote share for the CAQ, putting them in second place behind the PQ. Fréchette enjoyed a fair amount of personal public popularity. Four debates were held in September in advance of the early October vote; Fréchette was put on the defensive, and her debate performance was generally criticized. The party's early campaign momentum waned in late September. The CAQ came under further media criticism after alleging a few days before advance polls opened that the United States might attempt to interfere with the election in favour of the PQ. Opposition party leaders dismissed the claims as fearmongering. Globe and Mail columnist Konrad Yakabuski described the furour as "what appears to have been a staged effort to create the impression of election interference" in a 2 October column. Yakabuski wrote that the CAQ campaign was now in "damage-control mode" and that "the CAQ’s implosion now ranks up there in the annals of election campaigns going off the rails". Opinion polls recorded a rapid collapse of CAQ support while support increased for the PLQ and the PCQ. By the end of September, Qc125 projected the CAQ would take 18% of the vote, in third place; on the eve of the election, Qc125 projected the CAQ would win just 16% of the vote, behind three other parties. In one of the worst defeats for a sitting government in Canadian history, the CAQ lost all its seats in the 2026 general election, winning 13.4% of the vote. The day following the election, Fréchette announced she would step down as leader of the party.

Following the election, Mathieu Lévesque was named as interim leader of the CAQ. Public opinion polls have shown that public support for the party continues to decrease.

== Ideology and policies ==
The party has been described as right-wing populist and conservative nationalist, as well as anti-immigration and skeptical of multiculturalism.

The party self-described itself as being neither of the left nor the right: it is not particularly economically conservative, with economic policies similar to the Quebec Liberal Party and social policies to their right. However, its politics have been described in the press as centre-right and populist. From the time the CAQ's merger with the ADQ until the Conservative Party of Quebec gained its first MNA in 2021, the CAQ was the most right-wing party in the National Assembly.

The party includes former federal Conservatives, former provincial Liberals and ex-péquistes.

=== Economy, healthcare and education ===
The party proposes government investment in education and partial decentralization of the healthcare system. They promise "to further develop the entrepreneurial culture in Québec" and provide government resources for the private sector. The party also supports austerity "to provide the government with the flexibility it needs to adapt to the ongoing changes in the economy"; one measure specifically mentioned is leaving 6,000 open Hydro-Québec employment positions unfilled.

The party supports abolishing school boards and increasing the autonomy of principals and their governing boards. In 2020, Its government abolished schools boards and replaced them with School service centre.

=== Immigration ===
The Coalition Avenir Québec (CAQ) has adopted a notably restrictive stance on immigration, marking a significant shift in Quebec's traditionally welcoming approach to newcomers. The party's immigration policy emphasizes the reduction of immigration levels and the implementation of stricter controls across various migration categories. This policy shift was a central component of the CAQ's successful 2018 electoral campaign, which saw the party increase its parliamentary representation from 21 to 74 seats, securing an absolute majority in the National Assembly of Quebec. This victory was unprecedented since 1970, as it was the first time neither the Quebec Liberal Party nor the Parti Québécois had governed the province.

Under the leadership of François Legault, the CAQ has argued that "Quebec has exceeded its integration capacity," advocating for a decrease in the number of admitted immigrants. One of the most controversial proposals introduced by the CAQ is the requirement for immigrants to pass a French and culture examination after three years of residence in Quebec, with the potential consequence of expulsion for those who fail to meet the standards. This measure aims to reinforce the province's commitment to preserving its French language and cultural identity, aligning with a common misinterpretation of the meaning of the provincial motto, "Je me souviens," which underscores the importance of collective memory, history, and traditions in Quebec society.

The CAQ's immigration policies have sparked significant debate within Quebec, particularly among the business community in Montreal. Critics argue that the reduction in immigration could adversely affect the province's economy, which relies heavily on foreign workers to fill approximately 100,000 vacant job positions. With an unemployment rate of 5.3% and an economic growth rate of 3%, the Montreal Chamber of Commerce has highlighted the potential negative impact of the CAQ's proposals on economic stability.

The CAQ's stance on immigration is part of a broader global trend where political leaders, such as Matteo Salvini of Italy, Viktor Orbán of Hungary, and Donald Trump of the United States, have promoted anti-immigration rhetoric in regions previously less influenced by such discourse. This trend reflects emerging challenges in regions like Quebec, which have historically been open to immigration but are now grappling with concerns over cultural integration and economic demands.

In contrast to Quebec's restrictive policies, the federal Canadian government has committed to a more expansive immigration strategy, aiming to welcome a record number of new immigrants—1.45 million by 2023—bringing the national population to approximately 39 million. While immigration has been a source of political division and the rise of extremism in various Western countries, Canada maintains a generally positive consensus on its value. Quebec stands out as an exception, where political discourse has increasingly capitalized on fears among Franco-Quebecer voters regarding the preservation of cultural identity.

==== Family reunification crisis ====
The CAQ's immigration policy extends to family reunification, where it has faced substantial criticism due to prolonged processing times. The government's approach has resulted in waiting periods approaching three years for family reunification applications, significantly exceeding the national Canadian average of approximately 13 months. By the end of 2023, Quebec had nearly reached its maximum admissions quota for family reunification, with approximately 10,600 planned admissions against a backlog of nearly 37,000 pre-approved applications. This bottleneck has led to significant strain on the immigration system, resulting in numerous families being separated for extended periods. The human impact of these delays has been profound, with many families experiencing prolonged separation, leading to feelings of frustration and betrayal among Quebec residents awaiting reunification. This situation contradicts the CAQ's stated goals of promoting integration and social cohesion within the province. Additionally, the rigid quotas set by the provincial government are viewed as limiting the federal government's ability to expedite family reunification processes, thereby exacerbating the backlog. Critics of the CAQ's family reunification policy argue that it represents a failure in both administrative efficiency and the party's capacity to uphold the fundamental values of Quebec society. There have been calls for urgent revisions to the province's immigration policies, emphasizing the need for better coordination with federal authorities and a more humane and responsive management of immigration applications. The CAQ's approach to family reunification is thus seen as detrimental not only to affected families but also to the broader societal goals of integration and community cohesion. According to data reported by the Journal de Montréal in July 2023, approximately 37,000 family sponsorship applications were pending, in stark contrast to the annual admission target of around 10,600 individuals.

=== Nationalism and separatism ===
The CAQ contends that the near half-century debate over sovereignty has hampered Quebec's economic and political progress. While the party does not support independence, it does identify as nationalist; it believes Quebec can thrive in Canada if the federal government is willing to grant more powers to the province.

On 10 April 2014, Legault, previously a staunch sovereignist, stated that a CAQ government would never hold a referendum on leaving Canada: "[There] will never be a referendum for the life of the coalition even after 10 years, even after 20 years, so that's clear. And I was clear but people understood something else." François Legault added, "Once it is clear that there will never be a referendum with the Coalition Avenir Québec, the anglophones and allophones, who don't want a referendum, have to understand that we offer an alternative to the Liberals."

During its CAQ government from 2018 to 2026, it did not hold a referendum on independence.

=== Culture ===
According to the party, Quebec is defined by "its historical heritage, the French language, its democratic ideals and the principles of the secularity of the State, and equality among men and women". The party supported the Quebec ban on face covering but also argue the ban is not extensive enough. They propose to prohibit the wearing of religious symbols by personnel in a position of authority, including teachers. The party supports interculturalism to "integrate newcomers". This includes limiting immigration and promoting the use of French without creating new barriers. However, they want to exempt Quebec from the requirements of multiculturalism. In 2018, it proposed cutting the number of immigrants by 20 per cent, to 40,000 annually. However, it plans to bring back numbers up to 52,000 a year in 2022.

In 2019, the CAQ government passed its long-awaited secularism bill Bill 21.

In May 2022, the CAQ government passed Bill 96, The bill strengthens the 1970s Charter of the French Language bill.

In April 2026, the CAQ government passed bill 9, which expanded on bill 21. Both bill 9 and bill 21 invokes the notwithstanding clause pre-emptively, shielding them from constitution challenge based on the Canadian Charter of Rights and Freedoms.

=== Other ===
Legault has stated "aggressive[ly]" that a CAQ government would not repeal Bill 101. He has also stated that a CAQ government will demand greater power for Quebec. The party is critical of the system of equalization payments in Canada and plans to remove Quebec from receiving such payments. The party introduced an electoral reform bill in September 2019. It abandoned plans to hold a referendum on electoral reform in the 2022 general election claiming there was not enough time.

=== 2026 Quebec general election ===
==== Public finances and taxation ====
For the 2026 general election, Christine Fréchette's team has presented a financial framework covering the 2026–2030 period. It provides for $9.2 billion in electoral commitments and an increase of $13 billion in the Quebec Infrastructure Plan, bringing it to $180 billion, 75% of which would be devoted to maintaining existing infrastructure. The CAQ also maintains the objective of returning to a balanced budget in 2029–2030.

==== Economy, employment and trade ====
The CAQ makes protecting Quebec's economy an important part of its campaign in the context of the trade war with the United States. In August 2026, the government introduced assistance programs for businesses affected by the new U.S. tariffs, including loans of up to $150,000 for certain small and medium-sized businesses and the Fonds offensif pour le renforcement des capacités économiques (FORCE) for larger businesses. Christine Fréchette has also supported a Canadian response to U.S. measures based on "strategic" counter-tariffs intended to maximize their impact on the United States while limiting their consequences for Quebec businesses.

The Fréchette team's financial framework also provides for investments in sectors considered strategic for Quebec's economy, including green energy, critical and strategic minerals, defence, artificial intelligence, aerospace and advanced technologies.

==== Health care and public services ====
The CAQ proposes accelerating access to health care in order to reduce waiting lists. It proposes, among other measures, accelerating the mechanism allowing patients waiting for surgery to be offered other treatment or care options when possible. The Fréchette team's financial framework also provides for investments intended to improve public services, particularly health care, as well as to modernize hospital infrastructure.

==== Housing and family policy ====
In housing, the Fréchette team proposes increased investment in homelessness prevention and support for vulnerable people. It plans to increase housing assistance by $100 million, add 1,000 rent supplements aimed at preventing homelessness and another 1,000 with support for people experiencing homelessness or at risk of becoming homeless.

As part of its family plan, the CAQ also proposes enhancing the Québec Parental Insurance Plan (QPIP), including by adding two weeks to paternity leave, improving benefits in cases of perinatal bereavement and giving parents greater flexibility in using parental leave. It also proposes increasing the Supplement for Handicapped Children by $50 per month and increasing each of the two levels of the supplement for children requiring exceptional care by $100 per month.

==== Education ====
Education is among the public services that the Fréchette team intends to strengthen. Its financial framework provides for investments in school infrastructure and maintains the priority given to addressing the maintenance deficit affecting public assets. The CAQ also presents improvements to educational services and student achievement as elements of its public-services development policy.

==== Environment, energy and natural resources ====
The CAQ places the energy transition and the development of natural resources among Quebec's strategic sectors. The Fréchette team intends to continue developing green energy and critical and strategic minerals, while strengthening Quebec's position in global supply chains. It links this policy to economic development and to increasing Quebec's capacity to act in a more uncertain geopolitical and trade environment.

==== Regional development and immigration ====
The CAQ states that it intends to continue the economic development of Quebec's regions and adapt public policies to their needs. It places particular emphasis on natural resources, energy, forestry and infrastructure in remote regions. On immigration, the party advocates an approach that takes into account Quebec's capacity to receive newcomers, labour-market needs and the capacity of public services and regions to integrate new arrivals.

==== French language and Quebec identity ====
The Fréchette team makes the protection and promotion of French a central commitment of its campaign. It proposes, among other measures, strengthening the protection of the French language by extending the application of Bill 101 to vocational and adult general education. It also intends to introduce, within the first 100 days of a Fréchette government, a bill aimed at renewing the parliamentary sovereignty provision of Bill 96. The CAQ presents French as Quebec's sole official and common language and links its protection to the affirmation of Quebec identity.

==== Quebec autonomy and federalism ====
The CAQ maintains an autonomist and federalist orientation. Christine Fréchette's team states that it intends to strengthen Quebec's capacity to act independently within its areas of jurisdiction while remaining within the Canadian federation. This approach is also reflected in its economic and international policy, including its intention to develop Quebec's trade relations and strengthen its presence in international markets.

== Election results ==
Election	Leader	Votes	%	Seats	+/–	Position	Status
2012	François Legault	1,180,235	27.05	19 / 125	▲12	3rd	Third party
2014	François Legault	975,607	23.05	22 / 125	▲3	3rd	Third party
2018	François Legault	1,509,427	37.42	74 / 125	▲52	▲1st	Majority
2022	François Legault	1,533,705	40.98	90 / 125	▲16	1st	Majority
2026	Christine Fréchette	571,520	13.30	0 / 127	▼90	▼5th	Extra-parliamentary

== Party leadership ==
=== Party leaders ===
Leader	Years of service	Years as premier
François Legault	2011–2026	2018–2026
Christine Fréchette	2026	2026
Mathieu Lévesque (interim)	2026–present	

=== Deputy premiers ===
MNA	Years of service
Geneviève Guilbault	2018–2025
Ian Lafrenière	2026

=== House leaders ===
MNA	Years of service
Gérard Deltell	2011–2014
François Bonnardel	2014–2018
Simon Jolin-Barrette	2018–2026
François Bonnardel	2026

=== House whips ===
MNA	Years of service
Daniel Ratthé	2012–2013
François Bonnardel	2013–2014
Donald Martel	2014–2018
Éric Lefebvre	2018–2024
Mario Laframboise	2024–2025
François Jacques	2025–2026

=== Party presidents ===
President	Years of service
Dominique Anglade	2012–2013
Maud Cohen	2013–2014
Stéphane Le Bouyonnec	2014–2018
Sarah Beaumier	2019–present

== Party branding ==
=== Logos ===
Logo history
2011 (Note: Logo used before official party launch on 14 November 2011)	2011	2015	2026	2026 (Note: Logo used during the 2026 general election)

=== Campaign slogans ===
- 2012: C'est assez, faut que ça change ! (Enough, things have to change!)
- 2014: On se donne Legault (Let's give ourselves Legault, pun with le go, "go ahead")
- 2018: Maintenant (Now.)
- 2022: Continuons. (Let's keep going.)
- 2026: Avançons (Let's move forward)
