= Canadian federal election results in the Côte-Nord and Saguenay =

Seats obtained by party (since 1945)

Liberal
Conservative
New Democratic
Bloc Québécois
Social Credit (defunct)
Progressive Conservative (defunct)
Independents

Electoral history
Year	Results
1940	
1935	
1930	
1926	
1925	
1921	
1917	
1911	
1908	
1904	
1900	
1896	

Canadian federal elections have provided the following results in the Côte-Nord (formerly called Manicouagan) and Saguenay–Lac-Saint-Jean.

== Regional profile ==
This region used to be traditionally Liberal, except for Roberval which has voted for the Social Credit Party. The Liberal dominance ended in 1984 as Brian Mulroney, who is from this area, was able to gather Quebec nationalist support and sweep the region in 1984 and 1988.

With the advent of the nationalist Bloc Québécois in 1993, nationalist support left the Tories, and this area became a traditional Bloc stronghold. This is true except for the Chicoutimi area which has voted federalist with André Harvey running as a Progressive Conservative and winning in 1997, and running as a Liberal and winning in 2000.

The Bloc swept the region in 2004, but the Conservatives picked up a seat here in 2006 and weakened the Bloc's grip on the remaining seats as Liberal support collapsed.

In 2011, another regional sweep gave four of the five seats to the New Democrats, shutting out the Bloc and leaving the Conservatives with one of their two seats. In the 2015 election, the NDP lost all but one of its seat in the region, while the Bloc managed a comeback in the Côte-Nord region, the Liberals won one seat in Chicoutimi and the Conservatives won one seat in the southwestern part of the region near Quebec City.

=== Votes by party throughout time ===
Election	Liberal	Conservative	New Democratic	Bloc Québécois	Green	People's	PC	Reform / Alliance	Social Credit	Others
1979	134,658; 55.3%	—N/a	10,710; 4.4%	—N/a	—N/a	—N/a	30,407; 12.5%	—N/a	62,838; 25.8%	5,083; 2.1%
1980	154,046; 66.6%	—N/a	17,837; 7.7%	—N/a	—N/a	—N/a	26,730; 11.6%	—N/a	24,027; 10.4%	8,609; 3.7%
1984	91,196; 33.0%	—N/a	12,942; 4.7%	—N/a	—N/a	—N/a	163,394; 59.1%	—N/a	288; 0.1%	8,619; 3.1%
1988	46,860; 17.5%	—N/a	35,089; 13.1%	—N/a	—N/a	—N/a	183,485; 68.5%	—N/a	—N/a	2,274; 0.8%
1993	42,328; 15.5%	—N/a	4,062; 1.5%	172,154; 63.1%	—N/a	—N/a	52,536; 19.2%	—N/a	—N/a	1,879; 0.7%
1997	59,370; 23.3%	—N/a	4,389; 1.7%	126,398; 49.6%	—N/a	—N/a	62,763; 24.6%	1,255; 0.5%	—N/a	767; 0.3%
2000	85,687; 35.2%	—N/a	4,430; 1.8%	122,996; 50.5%	—N/a	—N/a	6,305; 2.6%	17,775; 7.3%	—N/a	6,356; 2.6%
2004	57,901; 28.9%	14,473; 7.2%	9,453; 4.7%	110,989; 55.4%	4,843; 2.4%	—N/a	—N/a	—N/a	—N/a	2,858; 1.4%
2006	28,348; 12.7%	75,544; 33.9%	14,303; 6.4%	98,151; 44.1%	6,194; 2.8%	—N/a	—N/a	—N/a	—N/a	195; 0.1%
2008	23,268; 11.1%	79,537; 38.0%	12,778; 6.1%	89,731; 42.8%	4,189; 2.0%	—N/a	—N/a	—N/a	—N/a	0; 0.0%
2011	10,020; 4.5%	63,426; 28.2%	87,550; 39.0%	59,726; 26.6%	3,697; 1.6%	—N/a	—N/a	—N/a	—N/a	340; 0.2%
2015	63,411; 26.5%	55,007; 23.0%	59,458; 24.8%	57,332; 23.9%	3,901; 1.6%	—N/a	—N/a	—N/a	—N/a	564; 0.2%
2019	47,387; 19.9%	61,852; 25.9%	22,072; 9.3%	96,912; 40.6%	6,055; 2.5%	2,588; 1.1%	—N/a	—N/a	—N/a	1,634; 0.7%
2021	43,503; 19.5%	66,959; 30.1%	9,891; 4.4%	96,218; 43.2%	2,777; 1.2%	1,530; 0.7%	—N/a	—N/a	—N/a	1,935; 0.9%
2025	68,539; 28.0%	74,152; 30.3%	4,276; 1.7%	93,759; 38.3%	1,509; 0.6%	1,749; 0.7%	—N/a	—N/a	—N/a	744; 0.3%

Election statistics in Côte-Nord and Saguenay

Liberal
Conservative
New Democratic
Bloc Québécois
Green
Social Credit (defunct)
Reform (defunct)
Alliance (defunct)
Progressive Conservative (defunct)

== Detailed results ==
=== 2019 ===
Electoral district	Candidates							Incumbent
Electoral district	Liberal	Conservative	BQ	NDP	Green	PPC	Other	Incumbent
Beauport—Côte-de-Beaupré—Île d'Orléans—Charlevoix	Manon Fortin; 10,608; 20.95%	Sylvie Boucher; 15,044; 29.71%	Caroline Desbiens; 18,407; 36.35%	Gérard Briand; 2,841; 5.61%	Richard Guertin; 1,355; 2.68%	Jean-Claude Parent; 1,045; 2.06%	Raymond Bernier (NA); 1,335; 2.64%	Sylvie Boucher
Chicoutimi—Le Fjord	Dajana Dautovic; 7,504; 17.10%	Richard Martel; 16,155; 36.82%	Valérie Tremblay; 15,321; 34.91%	Stéphane Girard; 2,855; 6.51%	Lynda Youde; 1,388; 3.16%	Jimmy Voyer; 359; 0.82%	Line Bélanger (Rhino.); 299; 0.68%	Richard Martel
Jonquière	Vincent Garneau; 7,849; 15.90%	Philippe Gagnon; 10,338; 20.94%	Mario Simard; 17,577; 35.60%	Karine Trudel; 12,141; 24.59%	Lyne Bourdages; 1,009; 2.04%	Sylvie Théodore; 453; 0.92%		Karine Trudel
Lac-Saint-Jean	Richard Hébert; 13,633; 25.14%	Jocelyn Fradette; 12,544; 23.13%	Alexis Brunelle-Duceppe; 23,839; 43.96%	Jean-Simon Fortin; 2,753; 5.08%	Julie Gagnon-Bond; 1,010; 1.86%	Danny Boudreault; 448; 0.83%		Richard Hébert
Manicouagan	Dave Savard; 7,793; 19.29%	François Corriveau; 7,771; 19.24%	Marilène Gill; 21,768; 53.89%	Colleen McCool; 1,482; 3.67%	Jacques Gélineau; 1,293; 3.20%	Gabriel Côté; 283; 0.70%		Marilène Gill

=== 2015 ===
Electoral district	Candidates						Incumbent
Electoral district	Conservative	NDP	Liberal	BQ	Green	Other	Incumbent
Beauport—Côte-de-Beaupré—Île d'Orléans—Charlevoix	Sylvie Boucher; 16,903; 33.50%	Jonathan Tremblay; 9,306; 18.44%	Jean-Roger Vigneau; 13,556; 26.87%	Sébastien Dufour; 9,650; 19.13%	Patrick Kerr; 859; 1.70%	Mario Desjardins Pelchat (SD); 182; 0.36%	Jonathan Tremblay; Montmorency—Charlevoix— Haute-Côte-Nord
Chicoutimi—Le Fjord	Caroline Ste-Marie; 7,270; 16.60%	Dany Morin; 13,019; 29.72%	Denis Lemieux; 13,619; 31.09%	Élise Gauthier; 8,990; 20.52%	Dany St-Gelais; 907; 2.07%		Dany Morin
Jonquière	Ursula Larouche; 8,124; 16.89%	Karine Trudel; 14,039; 29.19%	Marc Pettersen; 13,700; 28.48%	Jean-François Caron; 11,202; 23.29%	Carmen Budilean; 656; 1.36%	Marielle Couture (Rhino.); 382; 0.79%	Claude Patry†; Jonquière—Alma
Lac-Saint-Jean	Denis Lebel; 18,393; 33.27%	Gisèle Dallaire; 15,735; 28.46%	Sabin Simard; 10,193; 18.44%	Sabin Gaudreault; 10,152; 18.37%	Laurence Requilé; 806; 1.46%		Denis Lebel; Roberval—Lac-Saint-Jean
Manicouagan	Yvon Boudreau; 4,317; 10.27%	Jonathan Genest-Jourdain; 7,359; 17.51%	Mario Tremblay; 12,343; 29.37%	Marilène Gill; 17,338; 41.25%	Nathan Grills; 673; 1.60%		Jonathan; Genest-Jourdain

=== 2011 ===
Electoral district	Candidates						Incumbent
Electoral district	BQ	Conservative	Liberal	NDP	Green	Rhinoceros	Incumbent
Chicoutimi—Le Fjord	Robert Bouchard; 14,675; 28.80%	Carol Néron; 12,881; 25.28%	Marc Pettersen; 2,852; 5.60%	Dany Morin; 19,430; 38.13%	Charles-Olivier Bolduc-Tremblay; 780; 1.53%	Marielle Couture; 340; 0.67%	Robert Bouchard
Jonquière—Alma	Pierre Forest; 9,554; 18.12%	Jean-Pierre Blackburn; 18,569; 35.22%	Claude Ringuette; 1,043; 1.98%	Claude Patry; 22,900; 43.44%	France Bergeron; 652; 1.24%		Jean-Pierre Blackburn
Manicouagan	Gérard Asselin; 10,495; 31.24%	Gordon Ferguson; 3,878; 11.55%	André Forbes (Note: André Forbes was on the ballot as a Liberal candidate, but was no longer endorsed by the party.); 1,882; 5.60%	Jonathan Genest-Jourdain; 16,437; 48.93%	Jacques Gélineau; 898; 2.67%		Gérard Asselin
Montmorency—Charlevoix— Haute-Côte-Nord	Michel Guimond; 16,425; 34.85%	Michel-Eric Castonguay; 9,660; 20.50%	Robert Gauthier; 2,628; 5.58%	Jonathan Tremblay; 17,601; 37.35%	François Bédard; 814; 1.73%		Michel Guimond
Roberval—Lac-Saint-Jean	Claude Pilote; 8,577; 21.25%	Denis Lebel; 18,438; 45.68%	Bernard Garneau; 1,615; 4.00%	Yvon Guay; 11,182; 27.70%	Steeve Simard; 553; 1.37%		Denis Lebel

=== 2008 ===
Electoral district	Candidates					Incumbent
Electoral district	BQ	Conservative	Liberal	NDP	Green	Incumbent
Chicoutimi—Le Fjord	Robert Bouchard; 19,737; 41.31%	Jean-Guy Maltais; 16,680; 34.91%	Marc Pettersen; 6,425; 13.45%	Stéphane Girard; 3,742; 7.83%	Jean-François Veilleux; 1,193; 2.50%	Robert Bouchard
Jonquière—Alma	Chantale Bouchard; 19,035; 37.50%	Jean-Pierre Blackburn; 26,639; 52.48%	Marc Dupéré; 2,616; 5.15%	Jean-François Paradis; 2,475; 4.88%		Jean-Pierre Blackburn
Manicouagan	Gérard Asselin; 15,272; 49.29%	Pierre Breton; 8,374; 27.03%	Randy Jones; 4,737; 15.29%	Michaël Chicoine; 1,491; 4.81%	Jacques Gélineau; 1,112; 3.59%	Gérard Asselin
Montmorency—Charlevoix— Haute-Côte-Nord	Michel Guimond; 21,068; 48.88%	Guy-Léonard Tremblay; 11,789; 27.35%	Robert Gauthier; 5,769; 13.38%	Jonathan Tremblay; 3,332; 7.73%	Jacques Legros; 1,147; 2.66%	Michel Guimond
Roberval—Lac-Saint-Jean	Claude Pilote; 14,619; 39.65%	Denis Lebel; 16,055; 43.54%	Bernard Garneau; 3,721; 10.09%	Catherine Forbes; 1,738; 4.71%	Jocelyn Tremblay; 737; 2.00%	Denis Lebel

=== 2006 ===
Electoral district	Candidates						Incumbent
Electoral district	BQ	Liberal	Conservative	NDP	Green	Independent	Incumbent
Chicoutimi—Le Fjord	Robert Bouchard; 19,226; 38.49%	André Harvey; 14,581; 29.19%	Alcide Boudreault; 12,350; 24.72%	Éric Dubois; 2,571; 5.15%	Jean-Martin Gauthier; 1,226; 2.45%		Robert Bouchard
Jonquière—Alma	Sébastien Gagnon; 20,569; 39.30%	Gilles Savard; 1,550; 2.96%	Jean-Pierre Blackburn; 27,262; 52.09%	Martin Bertrand; 2,028; 3.87%	Sylvain Dompierre; 928; 1.77%		Sébastien Gagnon
Manicouagan	Gérard Asselin; 18,601; 51.10%	Randy Jones; 5,214; 14.32%	Pierre Paradis; 6,910; 18.98%	Pierre Ducasse; 4,657; 12.79%	Jacques Gélineau; 824; 2.26%	Eric Vivier; 195; 0.54%	Gérard Asselin
Montmorency—Charlevoix— Haute-Côte-Nord	Michel Guimond; 22,169; 49.11%	Robert Gauthier; 3,989; 8.84%	Yves Laberge; 14,559; 32.25%	Martin Cauchon; 2,896; 6.42%	Yves Jourdain; 1,527; 3.38%		Michel Guimond; Charlevoix—Montmorency
Roberval—Lac-Saint-Jean	Michel Gauthier; 17,586; 45.20%	Luc Chiasson; 3,014; 7.75%	Ghislain Lavoie; 14,463; 37.18%	François Privé; 2,151; 5.53%	Sébastien Girard; 1,689; 4.34%		Michel Gauthier; Roberval

=== 2004 ===
Electoral district	Candidates						Incumbent
Electoral district	Liberal	BQ	Conservative	NDP	Green	Other	Incumbent
Charlevoix—Montmorency	Lisette Lepage; 8,598; 20.58%	Michel Guimond; 25,451; 60.91%	Guy-Léonard Tremblay; 5,259; 12.59%	Steeve Hudon; 1,055; 2.52%	Yves Jourdain; 1,422; 3.40%		Gérard Asselin; Charlevoix
Charlevoix—Montmorency	Lisette Lepage; 8,598; 20.58%	Michel Guimond; 25,451; 60.91%	Guy-Léonard Tremblay; 5,259; 12.59%	Steeve Hudon; 1,055; 2.52%	Yves Jourdain; 1,422; 3.40%		merged district
Charlevoix—Montmorency	Lisette Lepage; 8,598; 20.58%	Michel Guimond; 25,451; 60.91%	Guy-Léonard Tremblay; 5,259; 12.59%	Steeve Hudon; 1,055; 2.52%	Yves Jourdain; 1,422; 3.40%		Michel Guimond; Beauport—Montmorency—Côte-de-Beaupré—Île-d'Orléans
Chicoutimi—Le Fjord	André Harvey; 19,787; 43.43%	Robert Bouchard; 20,650; 45.33%	Alcide Boudreault; 2,385; 5.23%	Éric Dubois; 1,699; 3.73%	Paul Tremblay; 1,038; 2.28%		André Harvey
Jonquière—Alma	Daniel Giguère; 13,355; 29.12%	Sébastien Gagnon; 25,193; 54.93%	Gilles Lavoie; 2,217; 4.83%	François Picard; 1,561; 3.40%	Jean-Sébastien Busque; 679; 1.48%	Jocelyne Girard-Bujold (Ind.); 2,737; 5.97% ———— Michel Perron (Comm.); 121; 0.26%	Sébastien Gagnon; Lac-Saint-Jean—Saguenay
Jonquière—Alma	Daniel Giguère; 13,355; 29.12%	Sébastien Gagnon; 25,193; 54.93%	Gilles Lavoie; 2,217; 4.83%	François Picard; 1,561; 3.40%	Jean-Sébastien Busque; 679; 1.48%	Jocelyne Girard-Bujold (Ind.); 2,737; 5.97% ———— Michel Perron (Comm.); 121; 0.26%	merged district
Jonquière—Alma	Daniel Giguère; 13,355; 29.12%	Sébastien Gagnon; 25,193; 54.93%	Gilles Lavoie; 2,217; 4.83%	François Picard; 1,561; 3.40%	Jean-Sébastien Busque; 679; 1.48%	Jocelyne Girard-Bujold (Ind.); 2,737; 5.97% ———— Michel Perron (Comm.); 121; 0.26%	Jocelyne Girard-Bujold§ Jonquière
Manicouagan	Anthony Detroio; 8,097; 24.88%	Gérard Asselin; 19,040; 58.51%	Pierre Paradis; 1,601; 4.92%	Pierre Ducasse; 3,361; 10.33%	Les Parsons; 444; 1.36%		Ghislain Fournier†
Roberval	Michel Malette; 8,064; 23.19%	Michel Gauthier; 20,655; 59.41%	Ghislain Lavoie; 3,011; 8.66%	Isabelle Tremblay; 1,777; 5.11%	Marc-André Gauthier; 1,260; 3.62%		Michel Gauthier

==== Maps ====
1. Charlevoix-Montmorency
2. Chicoutimi-Le Fjord
3. Jonquière-Alma
4. Manicouagan
5. Roberval
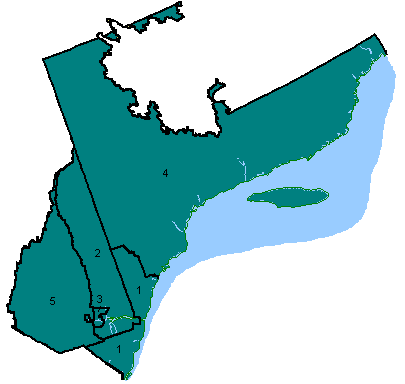
Key map

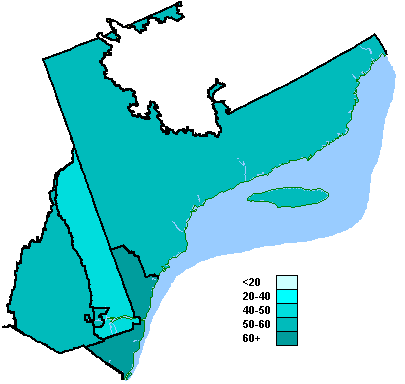
Bloc Québécois

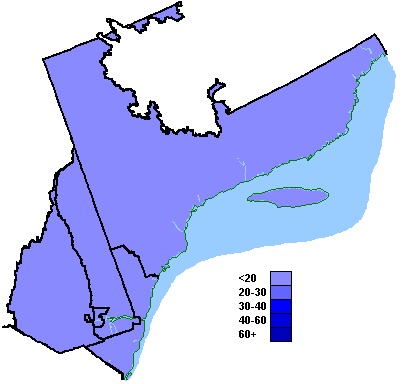
Conservative Party of Canada

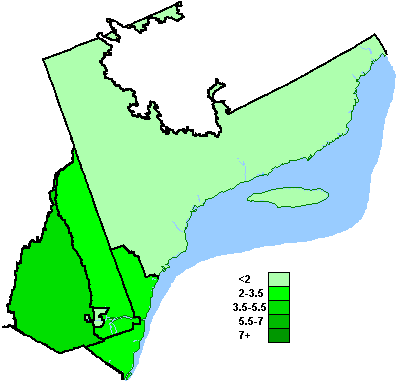
Green Party of Canada

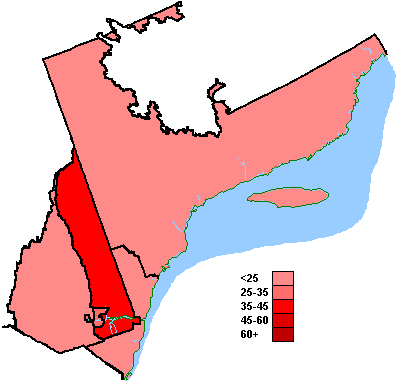
Liberal Party of Canada

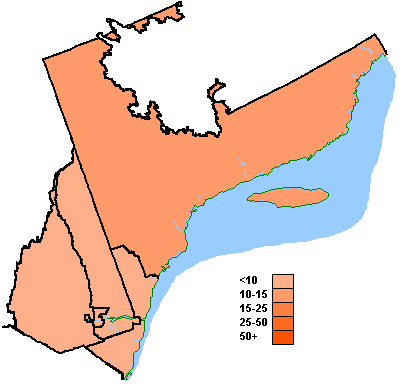
New Democratic Party

=== 2000 ===
Electoral district	Candidates						Incumbent
Electoral district	BQ	Liberal	Canadian Alliance	NDP	PC	Other	Incumbent
Beauport—Montmorency—Côte-de-Beaupré—Île-d'Orléans	Michel Guimond; 21,341; 41.55%	Chantal Plante; 18,714; 36.43%	Robert Giroux; 5,878; 11.44%	Eric Hébert; 869; 1.69%	Lise Bernier; 2,916; 5.68%	Jean Bédard (M-L); 283 0.55% Mathieu Giroux (Mar.); 1,364 2.66%	Michel Guimond; Beauport—Montmorency—Orléans
Charlevoix	Gérard Asselin; 20,479; 61.44%	Marjolaine Gagnon; 9,308; 27.93%	Pierre Paradis; 1,905; 5.72%	Joss Duhaime; 484; 1.45%	Doris Grondin; 1,154; 3.46%		Gérard Asselin
Chicoutimi—Le Fjord	Noel Tremblay; 15,073; 36.17%	André Harvey; 20,105; 48.24%	Douglas Schroeder-Tabah; 2,001; 4.80%	Alain Ranger; 698; 1.67%		Mauril Desbiens (Ind.); 3,797; 9.11%	André Harvey (Note: André Harvey was elected as a Progressive-Conservative in the 1997 election but left the PC caucus to seat as a Liberal MP.); Chicoutimi
Jonquière	Jocelyne Girard-Bujold; 16,189; 50.07%	Jean-Guy Boily; 11,574; 35.80%	Sylvaine Néron; 3,428; 10.60%	Michel Deraiche; 1,139; 3.52%			Jocelyne Girard-Bujold
Lac-Saint-Jean—Saguenay	Stéphan Tremblay; 21,391; 66.17%	Jérôme Tremblay; 7,536; 23.31%	Yannick Caron; 1,536; 4.75%	Linda Proulx; 417; 1.29%	Claude Gagnon; 535; 1.65%	Gilles Lavoie (Ind.); 912; 2.82%	Stéphan Tremblay; Lac-Saint-Jean
Manicouagan	Ghislain Fournier; 11,595; 53.24%	Robert Labadie; 7,770; 35.68%	Laurette de Champlain; 1,197; 5.50%	Normand Caplette; 386; 1.77%	Gaby-Gabriel Robert; 830; 3.81%		Ghislain Fournier
Roberval	Michel Gauthier; 16,928; 55.06%	Jean-Pierre Boivin; 10,680; 34.74%	Raymond A. Brideau; 1,830; 5.95%	Alain Giguère; 437; 1.42%	Marie-Christine Huot; 870; 2.83%		Michel Gauthier

=== 1997 ===
Electoral district	Candidates						Incumbent
Electoral district	BQ	Liberal	Reform	NDP	PC	Others	Incumbent
Beauport—Montmorency—Orléans	Michel Guimond; 21,994	Simone Gosselin; 13,863	Yves Baribeau; 1,255	Jessica Greenberg; 885	Michel Cliche; 12,748	Jean Bédard (M.-L.); 419	Michel Guimond
Charlevoix	Gérard Asselin; 19,792	Ghislain Maltais; 9,838		François Dumoutier; 454	Nicole Massicotte; 6,443		Gérard Asselin
Chicoutimi	Gilbert Fillion; 18,281	Eric Delisle; 4,839		Anne-Marie Buck; 853	André Harvey; 18,598		Gilbert Fillion
Jonquière	Jocelyne Girard-Bujold; 16,415	Martial Guay; 4,874		Carmel Bélanger; 353	Daniel Giguère; 11,808	Normand Dufour (NL); 348	André Caron
Lac-Saint-Jean	Stéphan Tremblay; 21,506	Clément Lajoie; 7,109		Jean-François Morval; 391	Sabin Simard; 4,845		Stéphan Tremblay
Manicouagan	Ghislain Fournier; 12,203	André Maltais; 10,671		Pierre Ducasse; 1,041	Michel Allard; 2,009		Bernard St-Laurent
Roberval	Michel Gauthier; 16,207	Jean-Pierre Boivin; 8,176		Alain Giguère; 412	France Tanguay; 6,312		Michel Gauthier

=== 1993 ===
Electoral district	Candidates						Incumbent
Electoral district	BQ	Liberal	PC	NDP	Natural Law	Abolitionist	Incumbent
Beauport—Montmorency—Orléans	Michel Guimond; 31,671	Doris Dawson-Bernard; 7,899	Charles Deblois; 12,687	Suzanne Fortin; 1,174	Gilles Rochette; 1,138	Micheline Loignon; 294	Charles Deblois; Montmorency—Orléans
Charlevoix	Gérard Asselin; 23,615	André Desgagnés; 7,140	Gérard Guy; 6,781	Audrey Carpentier; 552			Brian Mulroney
Chicoutimi	Gilbert Fillion; 29,392	Georges Frenette; 4,958	André Harvey; 11,038	Christine Moore; 541			André Harvey
Jonquière	André Caron; 25,061	Gilles Savard; 4,519	Jean-Pierre Blackburn; 6,637	Karl Bélanger; 410	Normand Dufour; 435		Jean-Pierre Blackburn
Lac-Saint-Jean	Lucien Bouchard; 27,209	Noël Girard; 5,263	Denise Falardeau; 3,115	Marie D. Jalbert; 444			Lucien Bouchard (Note: Lucien Bouchard was elected as a Progressive-Conservative in 1988 election but left the PC caucus in 1990 to seat as independent and then Bloc Québécois MP from 1991 onwards.)
Manicouagan	Bernard St-Laurent; 14,859	Rita Lavoie; 5,694	Charles Langlois; 6,024	Eric Hébert; 451			Charles Langlois
Roberval	Michel Gauthier; 18,869	Aurélien Gill; 6,443	Henri-Paul Brassard; 5,793	Alain Giguère; 485			Benoît Bouchard

=== 1988 ===
Electoral district	Candidates				Incumbent
Electoral district	PC	Liberal	NDP	Others	Incumbent
Charlevoix	Brian Mulroney; 33,730	Martin Cauchon; 5,994	Kenneth Choquette; 1,819	François Yo Gourd (Rhino); 600	Charles-André Hamelin
Chicoutimi	André Harvey; 30,699	Laval Gauthier; 8,047	Mustapha Elayoubi; 4,870		André Harvey
Jonquière	Jean-Pierre Blackburn; 21,523	Françoise Gauthier; 7,026	Laval Tremblay; 5,277		Jean-Pierre Blackburn
Lac-Saint-Jean	Lucien Bouchard; 27,209	Bertrand Bouchard; 5,390	Jean Paradis; 6,348		Lucien Bouchard
Manicouagan	Charles Langlois; 17,126	Sylvain Garneau; 6,355	Carol Guay; 4,008	Alan John York (PfC); 281	Brian Mulroney
Montmorency—Orléans	Charles Deblois; 30,578	Robert Paquet; 11,578	Éric Gourdeau; 7,700	Jean Bédard (Ind); 670	Anne Blouin
Roberval	Benoît Bouchard; 26,717	Martin Cauvier; 4,219	Réjean Lalancette; 3,318	Mémile Michel Simard (Rhino); 723	Benoît Bouchard

=== 1984 ===
Electoral district	Candidates						Incumbent
Electoral district	Liberal	PC	NDP	Parti nationaliste	Rhinoceros	Other	Incumbent
Charlevoix	Charles Lapointe; 11,906; 32.01%	Charles Hamelin; 23,661; 63.61%	Jocelyn Toulouse; 1,022; 2.75%	Victorien Pilote; 610; 1.64%			Charles Lapointe
Chicoutimi	Marcel Dionne; 10,736; 29.27%	André Harvey; 22,304; 60.81%	Denise Coté; 2,211; 6.03%	Marie-Claude Desloges; 626; 1.71%	Réjean Fou Fournier; 801; 2.18%		Marcel Dionne
Jonquière	Gilles Marceau; 14,088; 38.39%	Jean-Pierre Blackburn; 18,217; 49.64%	Jean Malaison; 1,870; 5.10%	Magella Archibald; 1,620; 4.41%	Richard Boudrias Bouchard; 905; 2.47%		Gilles Marceau
Lac-Saint-Jean	Pierre Gimaïel; 12,683; 31.01%	Clément M. Côté; 25,270; 61.79%	Claude Gagnon; 2,132; 5.21%	Yves Courville; 813; 1.99%			Pierre Gimaïel
Manicouagan	André Maltais; 9,640; 24.45%	Brian Mulroney; 28,208; 71.55%	Denis Faubert; 939; 2.38%	Laurian Dupont; 536; 1.36%		Raynald Rouleau (Com'lth); 101; 0.26%	André Maltais
Montmorency—Orléans	Louis Duclos; 19,226; 39.74%	Anne Blouin; 22,753; 47.03%	Jacques Bérubé; 3,931; 8.12%	Jules Gagnon; 586; 1.21%	Jean-Claude Pon Pon Demers; 1,599; 3.30%	Winifred Raiche-Boulay (SC); 288; 0.60%	Louis Duclos
Roberval	Suzanne Beauchamp-Niquet; 12,917	Benoît Bouchard; 22,981	Marius Tremblay; 837	Candide Simard; 422			Suzanne Beauchamp-Niquet

=== 1980 ===
Electoral district	Candidates					Incumbent
Electoral district	Liberal	PC	NDP	Social Credit	Other	Incumbent
Charlevoix	Charles Lapointe; 22,130	Jean-Pierre Dufour; 5,679	Normand Laforce; 1,273	Angelo Emond; 1,021	1,177	Charles Lapointe
Chicoutimi	Marcel Dionne; 20,821	Rodrigue Begin; 5,607	Marc St-Hilaire; 2,926	Hilaire Vézina; 1,110	375	Marcel Dionne
Jonquière	Gilles Marceau; 22,202	Marcel Mireault; 1,126	Jacques Hubert; 4,444	Harold Lévesque; 1,315	507	Gilles Marceau
Lac-Saint-Jean	Pierre Gimaïel; 21,267	Lucien Fortin; 4,608	Jean-Denis Bérubé; 3,465	Paul-Henri Tremblay; 2,821	1,411	Marcel Lessard
Manicouagan	André Maltais; 21,499	Jacques Blouin; 4,844	Roger Muller; 2,111	Marcel Brin; 1,184	1,681	André Maltais
Montmorency	Louis Duclos; 28,403	Georges Labrecque; 4,359	Joseph Thibodeau; 3,049	Winifred Boulay; 1,744	2,955	Louis Duclos
Roberval	Suzanne Beauchamp-Niquet; 17,724	Paul Desbiens; 507	Carol André Simard; 569	Charles-Arthur Gauthier; 14,832	503	Charles-Arthur Gauthier
