= Bloc Québécois candidates in the 2015 Canadian federal election =

This is a list of nominated candidates for the Bloc Québécois in the 2015 Canadian federal election.

== Candidate statistics ==
Candidates Nominated	Male Candidates	Female Candidates	Most Common Occupation
78	56	22	Business and education

== Quebec - 78 seats ==
=== Eastern Quebec ===
Riding	Candidate's Name	Notes	Gender	Residence	Occupation	Votes	%	Rank	Ref.
Avignon—La Mitis—Matane—Matapédia	Kédina Fleury-Samson	Former Mont-Joli councillor	F	Mont-Joli		7,641	21.0%	2	
Bellechasse—Les Etchemins—Lévis	Antoine Dubé	Former Member of Parliament for Lévis-et-Chutes-de-la-Chaudière	M		Consultant	7,217	11.5%	4	
Gaspésie—Les Îles-de-la-Madeleine	Nicolas Roussy		M	Québec	Consultant	8,289	20.9%	3	
Montmagny—L'Islet—Kamouraska—Rivière-du-Loup	Louis Gagnon		M	Rivière-du-Loup	Teacher	7,939	16.1%	4	
Rimouski-Neigette—Témiscouata—Les Basques	Johanne Carignan	Former Sainte-Flavie councillor	F		Nurse, manager	8,673	19.3%	3	

=== Côte-Nord and Saguenay ===
Riding	Candidate's Name	Notes	Gender	Residence	Occupation	Votes	%	Rank	Ref.
Beauport—Côte-de-Beaupré—Île d'Orléans—Charlevoix	Sébastien Dufour		M	Boischatel		9,650	19.1%	3	
Chicoutimi—Le Fjord	Élise Gauthier	Former Saint-Honoré councillor	F	Saguenay	Teacher	8,990	20.5%	3	
Jonquière	Jean-François Caron		M	Saguenay	Political attaché	11,202	23.3%	3	
Lac-Saint-Jean	Sabin Gaudreault		M	Alma	Retired teacher	10,152	18.4%	4	
Manicouagan	Marilène Gill		F	Baie-Comeau	Teacher	17,338	41.2%	1	

=== Quebec City ===
Riding	Candidate's Name	Notes	Gender	Residence	Occupation	Votes	%	Rank	Ref.
Beauport—Limoilou	Doni Berberi		M	Beauport	Businessman	7,467	14.8%	4	
Charlesbourg—Haute-Saint-Charles	Marc-Antoine Turmel	2013 municipal candidate in Québec	M	Charlesbourg	Student	7,177	12.3%	4	
Louis-Hébert	Caroline Pageau	2007 Action démocratique du Québec candidate in Taschereau	F		Translator	8,900	14.4%	4	
Louis-Saint-Laurent	Ronald Sirard		M		Lawyer	6,688	10.3%	4	
Québec	Charles Mordret		M		Businessman	10,153	18.8%	4	

=== Central Quebec ===
Riding	Candidate's Name	Notes	Gender	Residence	Occupation	Votes	%	Rank	Ref.
Bécancour—Nicolet—Saurel	Louis Plamondon	Member of Parliament for Bas-Richelieu—Nicolet—Bécancour and for Richelieu (PC 1984-1990, Bloc 1990-); dean of the House of Commons	M	Sorel-Tracy	Math teacher, businessman	20,871	40.0%	1	
Berthier—Maskinongé	Yves Perron		M	Berthierville	Teacher	14,037	25.8%	2	
Joliette	Gabriel Ste-Marie		M	Joliette	Economist and teacher	18,875	33.3%	1	
Lévis—Lotbinière	Steve Gagné		M		Financial counsellor	7,163	11.4%	4	
Montcalm	Luc Thériault	Former Member of the National Assembly for Masson	M		BQ staff, former philosophy teacher	19,405	36.6%	1	
Portneuf—Jacques-Cartier	Raymond Harvey		M	Sainte-Catherine-de-la-Jacques-Cartier		6,665	10.7%	4	
Repentigny	Monique Pauzé		F		Retired teacher	22,618	34.7%	1	
Saint-Maurice—Champlain	Sacki Carignan Deschamps		F	Shawinigan	Sociologist and teacher	11,295	19.2%	3	
Trois-Rivières	André Valois		M	Trois-Rivières	Retired accountant	10,249	17.0%	4	

=== Eastern Townships ===
Riding	Candidate's Name	Notes	Gender	Residence	Occupation	Votes	%	Rank	Ref.
Beauce	Stéphane Trudel	2012 Option nationale candidate in Beauce-Nord	M	Saint-Georges	Businessman	4,144	7.4%	4	
Brome—Missisquoi	Patrick Melchior	2012 Option nationale candidate in Brome-Missisquoi	M	Bedford	Community development	10,252	17.5%	3	
Compton—Stanstead	France Bonsant	Former Member of Parliament for Compton—Stanstead	F			11,551	20.7%	3	
Drummond	Diane Bourgeois	Former Member of Parliament for Terrebonne—Blainville; Saint-Lucien councillor	F	Saint-Lucien	Teacher	11,862	22.8%	3	
Mégantic—L'Érable	Virginie Provost		F	Thetford Mines	Student	5,838	12.3%	4	
Richmond—Arthabaska	Olivier Nolin		M	Victoriaville		10,068	17.2%	4	
Saint-Hyacinthe—Bagot	Michel Filion		M	Saint-Hyacinthe	Public manager	13,200	24.3%	3	
Shefford	Jocelyn Beaudoin	2012 and 2014 Option nationale candidate in Granby	M	Sainte-Cécile-de-Milton	Lawyer	13,092	22.2%	3	
Sherbrooke	Caroline Bouchard		F		Journalist	11,713	20.5%	3	

=== Montérégie ===
Riding	Candidate's Name	Notes	Gender	Residence	Occupation	Votes	%	Rank	Ref.
Beloeil—Chambly	Yves Lessard	Former Member of Parliament for Chambly—Borduas	M	Saint-Basile-le-Grand	Businessman, labour relations consultant	18,387	27.7%	3	
Brossard—Saint-Lambert	Suzanne Lachance	2000-2001 leader of the RAP; former Longueuil councillor	F	Human resources manager		6,071	10.6%	4	
Châteauguay—Lacolle	Sophie Stanké	Parti Québécois candidate in 2012 in Saint-Henri–Sainte-Anne and in 2014 in Laporte	F		Radio presenter	12,615	24.4%	2	
La Prairie	Christian Picard	2000 candidate in Saint-Lambert	M			15,107	26.2%	2	
Longueuil—Charles-LeMoyne	Philippe Cloutier		M	Longueuil	Teacher	13,974	27.0%	2	
Longueuil—Saint-Hubert	Denis Trudel		M	Longueuil	Actor	15,873	27.3%	3	
Montarville	Catherine Fournier		F	Sainte-Julie	Lecturer	16,460	28.4%	2	
Pierre-Boucher—Les Patriotes—Verchères	Xavier Barsalou-Duval	Former president of Forum jeunesse du Bloc Québécois 2012-2015	M	Boucherville	Accountant	17,007	28.6%	1	
Saint-Jean	Denis Hurtubise		M		Computer consultant	14,979	24.8%	3	
Salaberry—Suroît	Claude DeBellefeuille	Former Member of Parliament for Beauharnois—Salaberry	F	Ormstown	Social worker	17,452	28.4%	3	
Vaudreuil—Soulanges	Vincent François		M	Montréal		9,858	15.0%	3	

=== Eastern Montreal ===
Riding	Candidate's Name	Notes	Gender	Residence	Occupation	Votes	%	Rank	Ref.
Hochelaga	Simon Marchand	2014 Option nationale candidate for Hochelaga-Maisonneuve, President of l'AÉTÉLUQ	M	Hochelaga	Manager - Fraud prevention	14,389	27.7%	3	
Honoré-Mercier	Audrey Beauséjour	2014 Parti québécois candidate for Mont-Royal	F			6,680	12.9%	3	
La Pointe-de-l'Île	Mario Beaulieu	1997 candidate in Papineau—Saint-Denis, former party leader from 2014-2015, party president since 2014.	M	Montréal	Educator	18,545	33.6%	1	
Laurier—Sainte-Marie	Gilles Duceppe	Former Member of Parliament for Laurier—Sainte-Marie, Former Leader of the Bloc Québecois (1997-2011, 2015-2015)	M			15,699	28.7%	2	
Rosemont—La Petite-Patrie	Claude André		M			12,276	21.0%	2	

=== Western Montreal ===
Riding	Candidate's Name	Notes	Gender	Residence	Occupation	Votes	%	Rank	Ref.
Dorval—Lachine—LaSalle	Jean-Frédéric Vaudry		M			5,338	9.8%	4	
Lac-Saint-Louis	Gabriel Bernier		M		Student	1,681	2.7%	5	
LaSalle—Émard—Verdun	Gilbert Paquette	Former MNA for Rosemont; President of OUI.	M		Mathematician, professor, computer scientist	9,164	17.0%	3	
Mount Royal	Jade Bossé-Bélanger	2014 Option nationale candidate in Saint-Jean	F			908	1.9%	4	
Notre-Dame-de-Grâce—Westmount	Simon Quesnel		M		Student, salesman	1,282	2.5%	5	
Outremont	Roger Galland Barou		M		Businessman	3,668	8.4%	4	
Pierrefonds—Dollard	Natalie Laplante	Historian, scientist	F			2,043	3.5%	4	
Saint-Laurent	Pascal-Olivier Dumas-Dubreuil		M		Student	1,879	4.7%	4	
Ville-Marie—Le Sud-Ouest—Île-des-Soeurs	Chantal St-Onge	2014 Option nationale candidate in Rousseau	F	Saint-Hippolyte	Teacher	4,307	8.6%	4	

=== Northern Montreal and Laval ===
Riding	Candidate's Name	Notes	Gender	Residence	Occupation	Votes	%	Rank	Ref.
Ahuntsic-Cartierville	Nicolas Bourdon		M	Montréal	Teacher	7,346	13.2%	3	
Alfred-Pellan	Daniel St-Hilaire		M		Athletics coach	9,836	17.8%	3	
Bourassa	Gilles Léveillé		M	Montréal	Retired journalist and trade unionist	7,049	17.1%	2	
Laval—Les Îles	Nancy Redhead		F	Laval	Businesswoman	6,731	12.4%	4	
Marc-Aurèle-Fortin	Patrice Jasmin-Tremblay		M		Communicator	11,820	21.7%	3	
Papineau	Maxime Claveau		M	Montréal	Classical musician	6,182	12.2%	3	
Saint-Léonard—Saint-Michel	Steeve Gendron		M		Accountant, financial consultant	3,204	7.2%	4	
Vimy	Barek Kaddouri		M		Teacher	9,068	16.7%	3	

=== Laurentides, Outaouais and Northern Quebec ===
Riding	Candidate's Name	Notes	Gender	Residence	Occupation	Votes	%	Rank	Ref.
Abitibi—Baie-James—Nunavik—Eeyou	Luc Ferland	Former Member of the National Assembly for Ungava	M		Administrator	6,398	18.5%	3rd	
Abitibi—Témiscamingue	Yvon Moreau		M	Rouyn-Noranda	Journalist	9,651	19.4%	3rd	
Argenteuil—La Petite-Nation	Jonathan Beauchamp	2012 and 2014 Option nationale candidate in Papineau	M			9,525	18.6%	3rd	
Gatineau	Philippe Boily	President of l'Association générale des étudiants de l'Université du Québec en Outaouais; 2014 Option nationale candidate in Chapleau	M	Hochelaga	Consultant	5,455	9.4%	3rd	
Hull—Aylmer	Maude Chouinard-Boucher		F		Student	3,625	6.5%	4th	
Laurentides—Labelle	Johanne Régimbald		F	Mont-Tremblant		18,793	29.7%	2nd	
Mirabel	Simon Marcil	2012 Option nationale candidate in Labelle	M	Mirabel	Trade unionist	18,710	31.5%	1st	
Pontiac	Nicolas Lepage	2014 Option nationale candidate for Gatineau	M			4,327	6.9%	4th	
Rivière-des-Mille-Îles	Félix Pinel		M	Saint-Eustache	Teacher	14,755	25.4%	3rd	
Rivière-du-Nord	Rhéal Fortin		M		Lawyer	18,157	32.0%	1st	
Terrebonne	Michel Boudrias		M	Montréal	Soldier, activist	19,238	33.0%	1st	
Thérèse-De Blainville	Alain Marginean	2012 and 2014 Option nationale candidate in Groulx	M	Rosemère		15,238	27.0%	2nd	

== See also ==
- Results of the Canadian federal election, 2015
- Results by riding for the Canadian federal election, 2015
