= Bloc Québécois candidates in the 2019 Canadian federal election =

Candidates for the Bloc Québécois stood for office in all 78 of Quebec's electoral districts during the 2019 Canadian federal election. 32 candidates won their seat, an increase from 10 in the 2015 election, and gave Yves-François Blanchet's party the third most seats in the new House of Commons.

== Candidate statistics ==
Candidates Nominated	Male Candidates	Female Candidates	Most Common Occupation
78			

== Quebec - 78 seats ==
=== Eastern Quebec ===
Riding	Candidate's Name	Notes	Gender	Residence	Occupation	Votes	%	Rank	Ref.
Avignon—La Mitis—Matane—Matapédia	Kristina Michaud		F	Amqui	Political advisor	18,500	51.43	1	
Bellechasse—Les Etchemins—Lévis	Sébastien Bouchard-Théberge		M	Lévis	Administrator	14,754	22.89	2	
Gaspésie—Les Îles-de-la-Madeleine	Guy Bernatchez	Mayor of Saint-Maxime-du-Mont-Louis	M	Saint-Maxime-du-Mont-Louis	Forestry	15,659	40.80	2	
Montmagny—L'Islet—Kamouraska—Rivière-du-Loup	Louis Gagnon	2015 candidate in this riding	M	Rivière-du-Loup	Educator	16,261	32.27	2	
Rimouski-Neigette—Témiscouata—Les Basques	Maxime Blanchette-Joncas		M	Rimouski	Administrator	17,314	37.83	1	

=== Côte-Nord and Saguenay ===
Riding	Candidate's Name	Notes	Gender	Residence	Occupation	Votes	%	Rank	Ref.
Beauport—Côte-de-Beaupré—Île d'Orléans—Charlevoix	Caroline Desbiens		F	L'Isle-aux-Coudres	Singer-songwriter	18,407	36.35	1	
Chicoutimi—Le Fjord	Valérie Tremblay		F		Educator	15,321	34.91	2	
Jonquière	Mario Simard		M	Jonquière	University lecturer	17,577	35.60	1	
Lac-Saint-Jean	Alexis Brunelle-Duceppe	Son of Gilles Duceppe	M	Alma	Sound technician	23,839	43.96	1	
Manicouagan	Marilène Gill	Incumbent Member of Parliament	F	Pointe-Lebel	Educator	21,768	53.89	1	

=== Quebec City ===
Riding	Candidate's Name	Notes	Gender	Residence	Occupation	Votes	%	Rank	Ref.
Beauport—Limoilou	Julie Vignola		F	Quebec City	Educator	15,149	30.18	1	
Charlesbourg—Haute-Saint-Charles	Alain D'Eer		M		Filmmaker and director	16,053	27.16	2	
Louis-Hébert	Christian Hébert		M		Agricultural producer	17,375	28.00	2	
Louis-Saint-Laurent	Jeanne-Paule Desgagnés		F			14,674	22.38	2	
Québec	Christiane Gagnon	Former Member of Parliament for Québec (1993—2011)	F	Quebec City	Real estate agent	17,722	32.70	2	

=== Central Quebec ===
Riding	Candidate's Name	Notes	Gender	Residence	Occupation	Votes	%	Rank	Ref.
Bécancour—Nicolet—Saurel	Louis Plamondon	Incumbent Member of Parliament, Dean of the House of Commons	M	Sorel-Tracy	Educator and businessperson	29,653	56.66	1	
Berthier—Maskinongé	Yves Perron	2015 candidate in this riding, President of the Bloc Québécois	M	Saint-Félix-de-Valois	Educator	21,200	37.62	1	
Joliette	Gabriel Ste-Marie	Incumbent Member of Parliament	M	Joliette	Economist	33,590	58.22	1	
Lévis—Lotbinière	François-Noël Brault		M			15,921	25.08	2	
Montcalm	Luc Thériault	Incumbent Member of Parliament	M	Mascouche	University professor	31,971	58.01	1	
Portneuf—Jacques-Cartier	Mathieu Bonsaint		M	Neuville	Engineer	15,707	24.29	2	
Repentigny	Monique Pauzé	Incumbent Member of Parliament	F	Montreal	Union leader	34,837	53.22	1	
Saint-Maurice—Champlain	Nicole Morin		F			19,950	34.15	2	
Trois-Rivières	Louise Charbonneau		F	Trois-Rivières	Educator	17,240	28.48	1	

=== Eastern Townships ===
Riding	Candidate's Name	Notes	Gender	Residence	Occupation	Votes	%	Rank	Ref.
Beauce	Guillaume Rodrigue		M	Saint-Prosper		8,410	14.15	3	
Brome—Missisquoi	Monique Allard					21,152	34.43	2	
Compton—Stanstead	David Benoît					18,571	31.89	2	
Drummond	Martin Champoux		M	Sainte-Julie	Communications professional	24,574	44.82	1	
Mégantic—L'Érable	Priscilla Corbeil					12,249	25.78	2	
Richmond—Arthabaska	Olivier Nolin					16,539	28.21	2	
Saint-Hyacinthe—Bagot	Simon-Pierre Savard-Tremblay		M	Saint-Hyacinthe	Lecturer	23,143	41.39	1	
Shefford	Andréanne Larouche		F	Cowansville	Political attaché	23,503	38.58	1	
Sherbrooke	Claude Forgues					15,470	25.90	3	

=== Montérégie ===
Riding	Candidate's Name	Notes	Gender	Residence	Occupation	Votes	%	Rank	Ref.
Beloeil—Chambly	Yves-François Blanchet	Leader of the Bloc Québécois				35,068	50.46	1	
Brossard—Saint-Lambert	Marie-Claude Diotte					11,131	19.65	2	
Châteauguay—Lacolle	Claudia Valdivia					19,479	37.17	2	
La Prairie	Alain Therrien					25,707	41.76	1	
Longueuil—Charles-LeMoyne	Cathy Lepage					18,794	36.46	2	
Longueuil—Saint-Hubert	Denis Trudel					23,061	38.54	1	
Montarville	Stéphane Bergeron					25,366	42.83	1	
Pierre-Boucher—Les Patriotes—Verchères	Xavier Barsalou-Duval	Incumbent Member of Parliament	M	Boucherville	Auditor, teacher	31,009	51.02	1	
Saint-Jean	Christine Normandin					27,750	44.85	1	
Salaberry—Suroît	Claude DeBellefeuille					29,975	47.65	1	
Vaudreuil—Soulanges	Noémie Rouillard					16,600	24.36	2	

=== Eastern Montreal ===
Riding	Candidate's Name	Notes	Gender	Residence	Occupation	Votes	%	Rank	Ref.
Hochelaga	Simon Marchand	2015 candidate in the riding	M	Hochelaga	Fraud prevention manager	17,680	33.34	2	
Honoré-Mercier	Jacques Binette		M			9,979	19.81	2	
La Pointe-de-l'Île	Mario Beaulieu	Incumbent Member of Parliament, former leader of the Bloc Québécois	M	Montréal	Educator	26,010	46.84	1	
Laurier—Sainte-Marie	Michel Duchesne		M			12,188	22.82	3	
Rosemont—La Petite-Patrie	Claude André		M			14,306	23.76	3	

=== Western Montreal ===
Riding	Candidate's Name	Notes	Gender	Residence	Occupation	Votes	%	Rank	Ref.
Dorval—Lachine—LaSalle	Jean-Frédéric Vaudry					8,974	17.07	2	
Lac-Saint-Louis	Julie Benoît					3,169	5.32	5	
LaSalle—Émard—Verdun	Isabel Dion					12,619	24.09	2	
Mount Royal	Xavier Levesque					1,757	4.02	5	
Notre-Dame-de-Grâce—Westmount	Jennifer Jetté					2,359	4.69	5	
Outremont	Célia Grimard					5,741	13.85	3	
Pierrefonds—Dollard	Edline Henri					4,469	8.06	4	
Saint-Laurent	Thérèse Miljours					2,845	7.09	4	
Ville-Marie—Le Sud-Ouest—Île-des-Soeurs	Nadia Bourque					6,899	13.14	3	

=== Northern Montreal and Laval ===
Riding	Candidate's Name	Notes	Gender	Residence	Occupation	Votes	%	Rank	Ref.
Ahuntsic-Cartierville	André Parizeau					11,974	21.73	2	
Alfred-Pellan	Michel Lachance					15,549	28.63	2	
Bourassa	Anne-Marie Lavoie					9,043	22.41	2	
Laval—Les Îles	Nacera Beddad					11,120	20.61	2	
Marc-Aurèle-Fortin	Lizabel Nitoi					18,069	32.37	2	
Papineau	Christian Gagnon					8,124	16.00	3	
Saint-Léonard—Saint-Michel	Dominique Mougin					4,351	9.58	3	
Vimy	Claire-Emmanuelle Beaulieu					15,455	27.83	2	

=== Laurentides, Outaouais and Northern Quebec ===
Riding	Candidate's Name	Notes	Gender	Residence	Occupation	Votes	%	Rank	Ref.
Abitibi—Baie-James—Nunavik—Eeyou	Sylvie Bérubé					11,432	36.11	1	
Abitibi—Témiscamingue	Sébastien Lemire					22,803	45.47	1	
Argenteuil—La Petite-Nation	Yves Destroismaisons					18,167	36.34	2	
Gatineau	Geneviève Nadeau					11,926	21.38	2	
Hull—Aylmer	Joanie Riopel					8,011	14.57	2	
Laurentides—Labelle	Marie-Hélène Gaudreau					30,625	46.82	1	
Mirabel	Simon Marcil	Incumbent Member of Parliament	M	Mirabel	Union leader	33,219	51.08	1	
Pontiac	Jonathan Carreiro-Benoit		M		Student	9,929	16.05	3	
Rivière-des-Mille-Îles	Luc Desilets		M	Rosemère	School administrator	23,629	40.61	1	
Rivière-du-Nord	Rhéal Fortin	Incumbent Member of Parliament, former leader of the Bloc Québécois and Québec debout	M	Saint-Sauveur-des-Monts	Lawyer	31,281	52.05	1	
Terrebonne	Michel Boudrias	Incumbent Member of Parliament	M	Montreal	Political advisor	31,029	50.59	1	
Thérèse-De Blainville	Louise Chabot		F	Saint-Mathieu-du-Parc	Nurse, union leader	24,486	41.82	1	

== See also ==
- Results of the 2019 Canadian federal election
- Results of the 2019 Canadian federal election by riding
