= Bloc Québécois candidates in the 2021 Canadian federal election =

Candidates for the Bloc Québécois stood for office in all 78 of Quebec's electoral districts during the 2021 Canadian federal election. 32 candidates won their seat, the same number as in the 2019 election, and gave Yves-François Blanchet's party the third most seats in the new House of Commons.

== Candidate statistics ==
Candidates Nominated	Male Candidates	Female Candidates	Most Common Occupation
78	41	37	

== Quebec - 78 seats ==
=== Eastern Quebec ===
Riding	Candidate's Name	Notes	Gender	Residence	Occupation	Votes	%	Rank	Ref.
Avignon—La Mitis—Matane—Matapédia	Kristina Michaud	Incumbent MP	F	Amqui	Political advisor	19,776	59.8	1	
Bellechasse—Les Etchemins—Lévis	Marie-Christine Richard		F	Saint-Lazare	Political advisor	14,669	23.2	2	
Gaspésie—Les Îles-de-la-Madeleine	Guy Bernatchez	Mayor of Saint-Maxime-du-Mont-Louis	M	Saint-Maxime-du-Mont-Louis	Forestry	14,481	39.3	2	
Montmagny—L'Islet—Kamouraska—Rivière-du-Loup	Simon Bérubé		M	Saint-Pacôme	Public servant, journalist	12,550	26.2	2	
Rimouski-Neigette—Témiscouata—Les Basques	Maxime Blanchette-Joncas	Incumbent MP	M	Rimouski	Administrator	20,657	49.0	1	

=== Côte-Nord and Saguenay ===
Riding	Candidate's Name	Notes	Gender	Residence	Occupation	Votes	%	Rank	Ref.
Beauport—Côte-de-Beaupré—Île d'Orléans—Charlevoix	Caroline Desbiens	Incumbent MP	F	L'Isle-aux-Coudres	Singer-songwriter	19,270	38.4	1	
Chicoutimi—Le Fjord	Julie Bouchard		F		Union leader	14,027	33.4	2	
Jonquière	Mario Simard	Incumbent MP	M	Jonquière	University lecturer	19,036	41.9	1	
Lac-Saint-Jean	Alexis Brunelle-Duceppe	Incumbent MP	M	Alma	Sound technician	25,466	50.7	1	
Manicouagan	Marilène Gill	Incumbent MP	F	Pointe-Lebel	Educator	18,419	52.6	1	

=== Quebec City ===
Riding	Candidate's Name	Notes	Gender	Residence	Occupation	Votes	%	Rank	Ref.
Beauport—Limoilou	Julie Vignola	Incumbent MP	F	Quebec City	Educator	15,146	31.1	1	
Charlesbourg—Haute-Saint-Charles	Marie-Christine Lamontagne		F	Quebec City	Political advisor	14,237	24.8	2	
Louis-Hébert	Marc Dean	Son of Robert Dean	M	Quebec City	Trade unionist, civil servant	16,247	27.2	2	
Louis-Saint-Laurent	Thierry Bilodeau		M	Quebec City	Political advisor	13,069	20.4	2	
Québec	Louis Sansfaçon		M	Quebec City	Police officer	14,824	29.0	2	

=== Central Quebec ===
Riding	Candidate's Name	Notes	Gender	Residence	Occupation	Votes	%	Rank	Ref.
Bécancour—Nicolet—Saurel	Louis Plamondon	Incumbent MP; Dean of the House of Commons	M	Sorel-Tracy	Educator and businessperson	27,403	54.8	1	
Berthier—Maskinongé	Yves Perron	Incumbent MP; President of the Bloc Québécois	M	Saint-Félix-de-Valois	Educator	19,339	35.2	1	
Joliette	Gabriel Ste-Marie	Incumbent MP	M	Joliette	Economist	30,913	55.0	1	
Lévis—Lotbinière	Samuel Lamarche		M		Salesman	13,740	21.7	2	
Montcalm	Luc Thériault	Incumbent MP	M	Mascouche	University professor	27,378	53.2	1	
Portneuf—Jacques-Cartier	Christian Hébert		M			15,525	23.8	2	
Repentigny	Monique Pauzé	Incumbent MP	F	Montreal	Union leader	30,848	51.7	1	
Saint-Maurice—Champlain	Jacynthe Bruneau		F		Union leader	16,940	30.1	2	
Trois-Rivières	René Villemure		M			17,136	29.5	1	

=== Eastern Townships ===
Riding	Candidate's Name	Notes	Gender	Residence	Occupation	Votes	%	Rank	Ref.
Beauce	Solange Thibodeau		F		City Coucillor	8,644	15.2	3	
Brome—Missisquoi	Marilou Alarie		F			21,291	34.6	2	
Compton—Stanstead	Nathalie Bresse		F	Ascot Corner	Mayor	17,681	30.6	2	
Drummond	Martin Chamoux	Incumbent MP	M		Radio and TV host	23,866	46.6	1	
Mégantic—L'Érable	Éric Labonté		M		Administrator and businessman	9,318	20.1	2	
Richmond—Arthabaska	Diego Scalzo		M		Mayor	14,150	24.8	2	
Saint-Hyacinthe—Bagot	Simon-Pierre Savard-Tremblay	Incumbent MP	M			25,165	47.5	1	
Shefford	Andréanne Larouche	Incumbent MP	F			24,997	41.9	1	
Sherbrooke	Ensaf Haidar		F	Sherbrooke		16,848	29.0	2	

=== Montérégie ===
Riding	Candidate's Name	Notes	Gender	Residence	Occupation	Votes	%	Rank	Ref.
Beloeil—Chambly	Yves-François Blanchet	Incumbent MP/Leader of the Bloc Québécois	M			34,678	53.1	1	
Brossard—Saint-Lambert	Marie-Laurence Desgagné		F			10,441	19.9	2	
Châteauguay—Lacolle	Patrick O'Hara		M			18,017	37.0	2	
La Prairie	Alain Therrien	House Leader	M			25,862	43.7	1	
Longueuil—Charles-LeMoyne	Nathalie Boisclair		F		City counselor	16,926	35.3	2	
Longueuil—Saint-Hubert	Denis Trudel	Incumbent MP	M		Actor	23,579	41.2	1	
Montarville	Stéphane Bergeron	Incumbent MP	M			26,011	45.3	1	
Pierre-Boucher—Les Patriotes—Verchères	Xavier Barsalou-Duval	Incumbent MP	M	Boucherville	Accounting Auditor	29,978	54.3	1	
Saint-Jean	Christine Normandin	Incumbent MP	F		Lawyer	27,243	46.0	1	
Salaberry—Suroît	Claude Debellefeuille	Incumbent MP	F			29,093	47.8	1	
Vaudreuil—Soulanges	Thierry Vadnais-Lapierre		M			14,308	22.2	2	

=== Eastern Montreal ===
Riding	Candidate's Name	Notes	Gender	Residence	Occupation	Votes	%	Rank	Ref.
Hochelaga	Simon Marchand		M			15,089	31.6	2	
Honoré-Mercier	Charlotte Lévesque-Marin		F			7,908	16.3	2	
La Pointe-de-l'Île	Mario Beaulieu	Incumbent MP	M			23,835	46.7	1	
Laurier—Sainte-Marie	Marie-Eve-Lyne Michel		F		Staffer	9,114	20.4	3	
Rosemont—La Petite-Patrie	Shophika Vaithyanathasarma		F			1,751	21.4	3	

=== Western Montreal ===
Riding	Candidate's Name	Notes	Gender	Residence	Occupation	Votes	%	Rank	Ref.
Dorval—Lachine—LaSalle	Cloé Rose Jenneau		F	Saint-Jean-sur-Richelieu		7,542	15.7	2	
Lac-Saint-Louis	Rémi Lebeuf		M			3,078	5.3	4	
LaSalle—Émard—Verdun	Raphaël Guérard		M	Montreal		10,461	22.1	2	
Mount Royal	Yegor Komarov		M	Montreal	Lawyer	1,585	3.9	4	
Notre-Dame-de-Grâce—Westmount	Jordan Craig Larouche		M			2,407	5.3	4	
Outremont	Célia Grimard		F			5,535	15.0	3	
Pierrefonds—Dollard	Nadia Bourque		F		Educational Psychologist	4,141	7.9	4	
Saint-Laurent	Florence Racicot		F			2,972	8.0	4	
Ville-Marie—Le Sud-Ouest—Île-des-Soeurs	Soledad Orihuela-Bouchard		F			6,176	12.5	3	

=== Northern Montreal and Laval ===
Riding	Candidate's Name	Notes	Gender	Residence	Occupation	Votes	%	Rank	Ref.
Ahuntsic-Cartierville	Anna Simonyan		F			11,112	22.0	2	
Alfred-Pellan	Isabel Dion		F		Social Worker	13,399	26.1	2	
Bourassa	Ardo Dia		M			6,907	18.7	2	
Laval—Les Îles	Guillaume Jolivet		M		Financial Advisor	9,656	19.1	2	
Marc-Aurèle-Fortin	Manon D. Lacharité		F			16,055	30.8	2	
Papineau	Nabila Ben Youssef		F		Comedian	6,830	15.0	3	
Saint-Léonard—Saint-Michel	Laurence Massey		F			3,395	8.1	4	
Vimy	Rachid Bandou		M			11,811	23.2	2	

=== Laurentides, Outaouais and Northern Quebec ===
Riding	Candidate's Name	Notes	Gender	Residence	Occupation	Votes	%	Rank	Ref.
Abitibi—Baie-James—Nunavik—Eeyou	Sylvie Bérubé	Incumbent MP	F			10,784	37.9	1	
Abitibi—Témiscamingue	Sébastien Lemire	Incumbent MP	M			23,120	50.6	1	
Argenteuil—La Petite-Nation	Yves Destroismaisons		M			17, 842	35.3	2	
Gatineau	Geneviève Nadeau		F			12,278	23.4	2	
Hull—Aylmer	Simon Provost		M			8,323	16.2	2	
Laurentides—Labelle	Marie-Hélène Gaudreau	Incumbent MP	F			32,133	50.1	1	
Mirabel	Jean-Denis Garon		M			29,376	46.5	1	
Pontiac	Gabrielle Desjardins		F			10,424	16.8	3	
Rivière-des-Mille-Îles	Luc Desilets	Incumbent MP	M			21, 645	40.6	1	
Rivière-du-Nord	Rhéal Fortin	Incumbent MP	M			29, 943	52.2	1	
Terrebonne	Nathalie Sinclair-Desgagné		F			24, 270	41.2	1	
Thérèse-De Blainville	Louise Chabot	Incumbent MP	F			21, 526	41.2	1	

== See also ==
- Results of the 2021 Canadian federal election
- Results of the 2021 Canadian federal election by riding
