= Bloc Québécois candidates in the 2000 Canadian federal election =

The Bloc Québécois (BQ) fielded seventy-five candidates in the 2000 Canadian federal election, covering all ridings in the province of Quebec. Thirty-eight of these candidates were elected, allowing the party to retain its position as the third-largest grouping in the House of Commons of Canada.

== Candidates ==
Riding	Candidate's Name	Gender	Residence	Occupation	Votes	%	Rank	Notes	Ref.
Abitibi—Baie-James—Nunavik	François Lemieux	M	Amos	Farmer	15,567	42.8	2		
Ahuntsic	Fatima El Amraoui	F	Saint-Hubert	International Affairs Advisor	17,132	32.2	2		
Anjou—Rivière-des-Prairies	Jacques Dagenais	M	Montreal	Retired	14,755	30.3	2		
Argenteuil—Papineau—Mirabel	Mario Laframboise	M	Notre-Dame-de-la-Paix	Notary	21,713	43.2	1		
Bas-Richelieu—Nicolet—Bécancour	Louis Plamondon	M	Tracy	Parliamentary	25,266	56.9	1	Incumbent MP	
Beauce	Gary Morin	M	Quebec	Educator	12,323	26.5	2		
Beauharnois—Salaberry	Daniel Turp	M	Montreal	Professor	20,938	42.4	2		
Beauport—Montmorency—Côte-de-Beaupré—Île-d'Orléans	Michel Guimond	M	Boischatel	Parliamentarian	21,341	41.5	1	Incumbent MP	
Bellechasse—Etchemins—Montmagny—L'Islet	François Langlois	M	Sainte-Claire	Notary	14,973	37.4	2		
Berthier—Montcalm	Michel Bellehumeur	M	Berthierville	Lawyer	31,647	57.1	1	Incumbent MP	
Bonaventure—Gaspé—Îles-de-la-Madeleine—Pabok	Raynald Blais	M	Boneaventure	Journalist	15,532	43.0	2		
Bourassa	Umberto Di Genova	M	Montreal-Nord	Retired Educator	11,462	28.1	2		
Brome—Missisquoi	André Leroux	M	Brigham	Federal Public Servant	13,363	31.2	2		
Brossard—La Prairie	Nicolas Tétrault	M	Pierrefonds	Administrator	16,758	32.9	2		
Chambly	Ghislain Lebel	M	Richelieu	Notary	26,084	49.9	1		
Champlain	Marcel Gagnon	M	Champlain	Businessman	20,423	45.3	1		
Charlesbourg—Jacques-Cartier	Richard Marceau	M	Charlesbourg	Lawyer	21,867	38.3	1		
Charlevoix	Gérard Asselin	M	Baie-Comeau	Parliamentarian	20,479	61.4	1	Incumbent MP	
Châteauguay	Robert Lanctôt	M	Delson	Lawyer	26,284	47.1	1		
Chicoutimi—Le Fjord	Noël Tremblay	M	Chicoutimi	Annuitant	15,073	36.2	2		
Compton—Stanstead	Gaston Leroux	M	Saint-François-Xavier-de- Brompton	Advisor	14,808	38.9	2		
Drummond	Pauline Picard	F	Drummondville	Parliamentarian	18,970	45.3	1	Incumbent MP	
Frontenac—Mégantic	Jean-Guy Chrétien	M	Beaulac	Parliamentarian	15,703	42.3	2	Incumbent MP	
Gatineau	Richard Nadeau	M	Gatineau	Education Specialist	12,817	25.4	2		
Hochelaga—Maisonneuve	Réal Ménard	M	Montreal	Parliamentarian	21,250	49.2	1	Incumbent MP	
Hull—Aylmer	Caroline Brouard	F	Hull	Social Worker	10,051	23.1	2		
Joliette	Pierre Paquette	M	Montreal	Teacher	23,615	52.2	1		
Jonquière	Jocelyne Girard-Bujold	F	Jonquière	Parliamentarian	16,189	50.1	1	Incumbent MP	
Kamouraska—Rivière-du-Loup—Temiscouata—Les Basques	Paul Crête	M	La Pocatière	Parliamentarian	23,319	60.0	1	Incumbent MP	
Lac-Saint-Jean—Saguenay	Stéphan Tremblay	M	Saint-Gédéon	Parliamentarian	21,391	66.2	1	Incumbent MP	
Lac-Saint-Louis	Guy Amyot	M	Le Gardeur	Businessman	3,913	6.7	4		
LaSalle—Émard	Denis Martel	M	Roxboro	Sales and Delivery Clerk	11,805	24.2	2		
Laurentides	Monique Guay	F	Prévost	Parliamentarian	30,337	49.9	1	Incumbent MP	
Laurier—Sainte-Marie	Gilles Duceppe	M	Montreal	Parliamentarian	23,473	52.8	1	BQ Party Leader and Incumbent MP	
Laval Centre	Madeleine Dalphond-Guiral	F	Laval	Parliamentarian	23,746	43.3	1	Incumbent MP	
Laval East	Mathieu Alarie	M	Laval	Administrator	24,726	42.5	2		
Laval West	Manon Sauvé	F	Bois-des-Filion	Lawyer	19,975	32.3	2		
Lévis-et-Chutes-de-la-Chaudière	Antoine Dubé	M	Saint-Romuald	Recreologist-Administrator	26,398	41.8	1	Incumbent MP	
Longueuil	Caroline St-Hilaire	F	Longueuil	Parliamentarian	20,868	52.2	1	Incumbent MP	
Lotbinière—L'Érable	Odina Desrochers	M	Quebec	Parliamentarian	15,351	45.6	1	Incumbent MP	
Louis-Hébert	Hélène Alarie	F	Saint-Jean-Chrysostome	Agrologist	21,240	36.9	2	Incumbent MP	
Manicouagan	Ghislain Fournier	M	Sept-Îles	Businessman	11,595	53.2	1	Incumbent MP	
Matapédia—Matane	Jean-Yves Roy	M	Pointe-au-Père	Teacher	14,678	46.6	1		
Mercier	Francine Lalonde	F	Laval	Lecturer	24,755	52.9	1	Incumbent MP	
Mount Royal	Jean-Sébastien Houle	M	Montreal	Student	1,740	4.3	3		
Notre-Dame-de-Grâce—Lachine	Jeannine Ouellet	F	Saint-Sauveur	General Director	8,449	18.1	2		
Outremont	Amir Khadir	M	Saint-Lambert	Medical Doctor	11,151	28.3	2		
Papineau—Saint-Denis	Philippe Ordenes	M	Montreal	Student	11,779	26.6	2		
Pierrefonds—Dollard	Sylvie Brousseau	F	L'Île-Bizard	Translator	5,937	11.0	2		
Pontiac—Gatineau—Labelle	Johanne Deschamps	F	Val-Barrette	Constituency Office Assistant	14,552	32.1	2		
Portneuf	Patrice Dallaire	M	Sainte-Foy	Public Servant	15,444	35.2	2		
Québec	Christiane Gagnon	F	Sainte-Foy	Real Estate Agent	22,793	43.4	1	Incumbent MP	
Québec-Est	Jean-Paul Marchand	M	L'Ancienne-Lorette	Professor	21,166	37.5	2	Incumbent MP	
Repentigny	Benoît Sauvageau	M	Repentigny	Professor	33,627	57.8	1	Incumbent MP	
Richmond—Arthabaska	André Bellavance	M	Victoriaville	Journalist	18,067	36.5	2		
Rimouski—Neigette-et-La-Mitis	Suzanne Tremblay	F	Le Bic	Parliamentarian	19,759	59.5	1	Incumbent MP	
Rivière-des-Mille-Îles	Gilles Perron	M	Saint-Eustache	Technician	26,508	49.9	1	Incumbent MP	
Roberval	Michel Gauthier	M	Roberval	Parliamentarian	14,973	55.1	1	Incumbent MP	
Rosemont—Petite-Patrie	Bernard Bigras	M	Montreal	Parliamentarian	23,315	49.1	1	Incumbent MP	
Saint-Bruno—Saint-Hubert	Pierrette Venne	F	Carignan	Notary	22,217	44.0	1	Incumbent MP	
Saint-Hyacinthe—Bagot	Yvan Loubier	M	Saint-Hyacinthe	Economist	25,916	55.4	1	Incumbent MP	
Saint-Jean	Claude Bachand	M	Saint-Jean-sur-Richelieu	Econimist	22,286	47.4	1	Incumbent MP	
Saint-Lambert	Christian Picard	M	Greenfield Park	Parliamentary Affairs Coordinator	16,520	38.1	2		
Saint-Laurent—Cartierville	Yves Beauregard	M	Montreal	Food Worker	5,838	13.1	2		
Saint-Léonard—Saint-Michel	Marcel Ferlatte	M	Mascouche	Operator Training	6,679	14.5	2		
Saint-Maurice	François Marchand	M	Shawinigan-Sud	Lawyer	16,821	39.0	2		
Shefford	Michel Benoit	M	Granby	Administrator	19,816	44.0	2		
Sherbrooke	Serge Cardin	M	Sherbrooke	Parliamentarian	23,559	46.5	1	Incumbent MP	
Témiscamingue	Pierre Brien	M	Ville-Marie	Parliamentarian	18,803	46.7	1	Incumbent MP	
Terrebonne—Blainville	Diane Bourgeois	F	Terrebonne	Teacher	28,933	51.9	1		
Trois-Rivières	Yves Rocheleau	M	Trois-Rivière	Parliamentarian	22,405	46.7	1	Incumbent MP	
Vaudreuil—Soulanges	Éric Cimon	M	Montreal	Community Organizer	17,587	34.5	2		
Verchères—Les Patriotes	Stéphane Bergeron	M	Varennes	Parliamentarian	28,696	52.3	1	Incumbent MP	
Verdun—Saint-Henri—Saint-Paul—Pointe Saint-Charles	Pedro Utillano	M	Montreal	Wardmaster	11,976	29.4	2		
Westmount—Ville-Marie	Marcela Valdivia	F	Montreal	Lawyer	4,121	10.7	3		

== See also ==
- Results of the Canadian federal election, 2000
