= Gustave Blouin =

Canadian politician

- Official 1974 portrait

Member of Parliament for Saguenay
- In office 1963–1968
- Preceded by: Lauréat Maltais
- Succeeded by: riding dissolved

Member of Parliament for Manicouagan
- In office 1968–1979
- Preceded by: first member
- Succeeded by: André Maltais

Personal details
- Born: July 12, 1912 Sept-Îles, Quebec
- Died: April 14, 2002 (aged 89)
- Party: Liberal
- Occupation: manufacturer

Gustave Blouin (July 12, 1912 – April 14, 2002) was a Canadian politician and manufacturer. He was elected to the House of Commons of Canada as a Member of the Liberal Party in the 1963 election to represent the riding of Saguenay. He was re-elected in the elections of 1965 then to the new riding of Manicouagan in 1968, 1972 and 1974.

During his time in the legislature, he served as a parliamentary secretary to the Secretary of State of Canada as well as the Minister of Public Works. He was also a member of numerous Commons standing committees including Broadcasting, Films and Assistance to the Arts, Fisheries and Forestry, Transport and Communications, External Affairs and National Defence and Indian Affairs and Northern Development.
