= 2018 New Democratic Party of Quebec leadership election =

- January 21, 2018
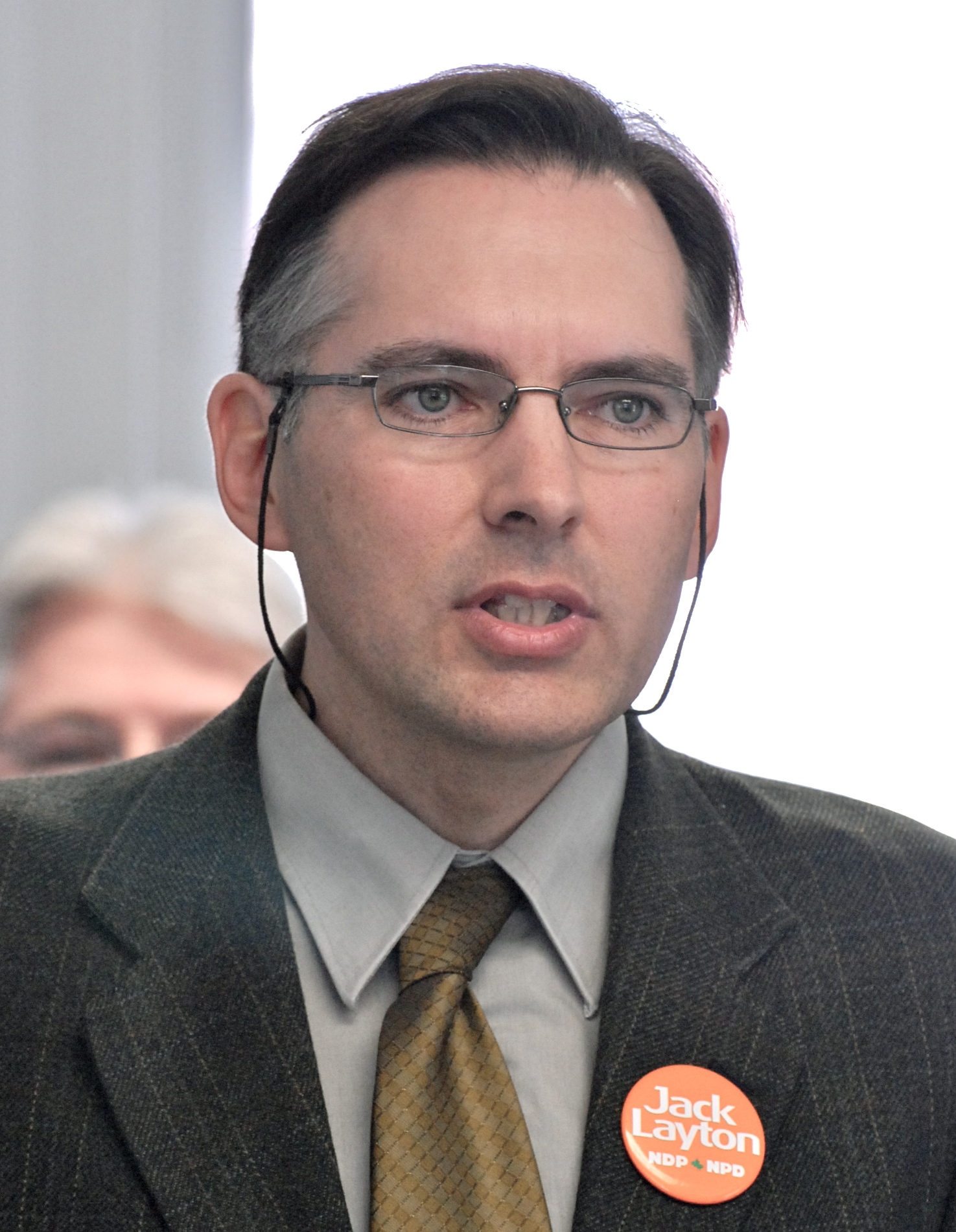
Candidate	Raphaël Fortin	Raymond Côté
Votes	246	151
Percentage	62%	38%
Leader before election
Pierre Ducasse (Interim)
Elected Leader
Raphaël Fortin

2018 New Democratic Party of Quebec leadership election
- Date: January 21, 2018
- Resigning leader: Pierre Ducasse
- Won by: Raphaël Fortin
- Ballots: 1
- Candidates: 2
- Entrance fee: $3,500
- Spending limit: $25,000

The New Democratic Party of Quebec (2014) elected a permanent leader on January 21, 2018 to lead it into the 2018 provincial election. Interim leader Pierre Ducasse announced he would not be a candidate in the leadership election.

== Timeline ==
- September 1, 2017 - Nomination period opens.
- October 20, 2017 - Nomination deadline.
- November 25, 2017, 2:30 pm - Candidates debate in Montreal.
- December 9, 2017, 2:30 pm - Candidates debate in Gatineau.
- December 16, 2017 - English debate in Montreal.
- January 21, 2018 - Leadership election is held.

== Candidates ==
=== Raymond Côté ===
Background

Former MP for Beauport—Limoilou (2011-2015).

=== Raphaël Fortin ===
Background

Candidate in the 2015 federal election in Pierre-Boucher—Les Patriotes—Verchères and 2008 in Verchères—Les Patriotes.

Endorsements

Paulina Ayala, former Member of Parliament for Honoré-Mercier

=== Declined ===
- Denis Blanchette, president of the Quebec NDP, NDPQ candidate in the Louis-Hébert provincial by-election (October 2, 2017), former MP for Louis-Hébert (2011-2015).
- Pierre Ducasse, interim leader (2014–present), federal NDP Quebec lieutenant (2003-2007), Associate President of the New Democratic Party (2000-2002), ran in the 2003 New Democratic Party leadership election and placed fifth.

== Results ==
- Raphaël Fortin 62%
- Raymond Côté 38%

Total votes cast: 397 votes

Turnout: 67.51%
