= Maltais =

Maltais is a surname. Notable people with the surname include:

- Agnès Maltais (1956-), Canadian politician
- André Maltais (1948-), Canadian politician
- Dominique Maltais 1980-), Canadian snowboarder
- Emma Maltais (1999-), Canadian ice hockey player
- Steve Maltais (1969-), Canadian ice hockey player
- Valérie Maltais (1990-), Canadian ice skater
