= Perrault LaRue =

Canadian politician (1925–1987)

Member of Parliament for Saguenay
- In office March 1958 – June 1962
- Preceded by: Lomer Brisson
- Succeeded by: Lauréat Maltais

Personal details
- Born: 31 March 1925 Amqui, Quebec
- Died: 8 November 1987 (aged 62)
- Party: Progressive Conservative
- Profession: dentist

Perrault LaRue (31 March 1925, Amqui, Quebec – 8 November 1987) was a Progressive Conservative party member of the House of Commons of Canada. He was a dentist by career.

He was elected at the Saguenay riding in the 1958 general election and served only one term, the 24th Canadian Parliament. LaRue did not seek re-election to Parliament after this.
