= Lauréat Maltais =

Canadian politician

Member of Parliament for Saguenay
- In office September 1962 – April 1963
- Preceded by: Perrault LaRue
- Succeeded by: Gustave Blouin

Personal details
- Born: 30 June 1923 Bergeronnes, Quebec
- Died: 23 March 1979 (aged 55) Quebec
- Party: Social Credit
- Profession: manager

Lauréat Maltais (30 June 1923 – 1979) was a Social Credit party member of the House of Commons of Canada. He was born in Bergeronnes, Quebec and became a manager by career.

He was first elected at the Saguenay riding in the 1962 general election. After serving his only term, the 25th Canadian Parliament, Maltais was defeated in the 1963 federal election by Gustave Blouin of the Liberal party.
