= Pierre Ducasse (politician) =

Canadian politician (born 1972)

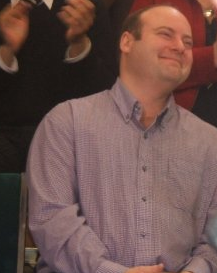
- Pierre at a NDP rally, 2008 or earlier

Leader of the New Democratic Party of Quebec (interim)
- In office 2014–2018
- Preceded by: none (party refounded)
- Succeeded by: Raphaël Fortin

Associate President of the New Democratic Party
- In office 2000 – June 25, 2002

Personal details
- Born: August 18, 1972 (age 54)
- Citizenship: Canada
- Party: New Democratic Party
- Education: Université Laval
- Website: pierreducasse.ca

Pierre Ducasse (born August 18, 1972) is a Canadian politician and New Democratic Party (NDP) activist.

He grew up in Sept-Îles, Quebec, and studied at Université Laval. A party member since age 17, he was appointed interim associate president of the federal party in 2000, and was elected to the post at the NDP convention in Winnipeg in November 2001.

== 2003 NDP leadership election ==
In January 2003, he became the first francophone Quebecer to run for the federal leadership of the party. Although he placed fifth among the six candidates, his campaign was widely acclaimed for raising the profile of the NDP in Quebec and vice versa. Ken Georgetti, president of the Canadian Labour Congress, endorsed him prior to the first ballot.

Jack Layton, the Quebec-born winner of the leadership election, appointed Ducasse to be the party's Quebec lieutenant and official spokesman in Quebec. Ducasse held the post of Quebec lieutenant through two elections until the spring of 2007 when he was replaced by Thomas Mulcair, a former Member of the National Assembly of Quebec and Quebec cabinet minister.

== Federal elections ==
Ducasse was the NDP candidate for the riding of Manicouagan three times, first in the federal election of 1997, and then in the 2004 and 2006 federal elections. In 2008, Ducasse was the NDP candidate in the riding of Hull-Aylmer.

In 2004, Ducasse finished third in Manicouagan, in a race won by Gérard Asselin of the Bloc Québécois. In 2006, again in Manicouagan, Ducasse placed fourth, but improved his overall result to 4,657 votes or 12.8%. Ducasse received his best result to date in 2008 in Hull-Aylmer, where he placed third with 10,424 votes, for 19.83% of all votes cast in the riding. Liberal Marcel Proulx won the riding with 19,747 votes, or 37.47%, while Bloc Québécois candidate Raphaël Déry finished in second with 11 635 votes, or 22.07%.

In 2011, when he might have run again in Hull-Aylmer, Ducasse and Nycole Turmel had discussions where he learned Turmel might be interested in running. Ducasse decided not to run "because she is a fantastic person and candidate, and I just had a baby."

On September 29, 2014 Ducasse declared his intention to seek the federal NDP nomination in Manicouagan a fourth time, challenging incumbent NDP MP Jonathan Genest-Jourdain. He withdrew his candidacy a month later when the party confirmed that the nomination meeting would be held on November 6, 2014, declining Ducasse's request that the meeting be delayed to a later date. Ducasse said that scheduled meeting date had not allowed him enough time to recruit support.

== 2009 municipal election ==
Ducasse ran the 2009 Gatineau municipal election on November 1 of that year. He ran for Gatineau City Council in the Hull–Val-Tétreau District. He lost however, to two-term incumbent Denise Laferrière. The district is centred in Downtown Hull.

== Quebec provincial politics ==
Ducasse became the leader of record of the New Democratic Party of Quebec following its re-founding on January 30, 2014. He announced that he would not be a candidate in the leadership election to be held in January 2018.

== Electoral record (partial) ==
2008 Canadian federal election: Hull—Aylmer
Party	Candidate	Votes	%	Expenditures
Liberal	Marcel Proulx	19,750	37.45	$79,057
Bloc Québécois	Raphaël Déry	11,625	22.05	$69,097
New Democratic	Pierre Ducasse	10,454	19.83	$45,531
Conservative	Paul Fréchette	7,996	15.16	$56,752
Green	Frédéric Pouyot	2,784	5.28	$3,327
Marxist–Leninist	Gabriel Girard-Bernier	121	0.23	none listed
Total valid votes/expenditure limit		52,730	100.00	$89,492
Total rejected ballots		359		
Turnout		53,089	61.00	
Electors on the lists		87,036		

2006 Canadian federal election: Manicouagan
Party	Candidate	Votes	%	±%	Expenditures
Bloc Québécois	Gérard Asselin	18,601	51.10	−7.41	$57,481
Conservative	Pierre Paradis	6,910	18.98	+14.06	$10,185
Liberal	Randy Jones	5,214	14.32	−10.56	$21,522
New Democratic	Pierre Ducasse	4,657	12.79	+2.46	$19,632
Green	Jacques Gélineau	824	2.26	+0.90	$373
Independent	Eric Vivier	195	0.54		none listed
Total valid votes		36,401	100.00		
Total rejected ballots		388			
Turnout		36,789	57.00	+6.14	
Electors on the lists		64,537			
Sources: Official Results, Elections Canada and Financial Returns, Elections Canada.

2004 Canadian federal election: Manicouagan
Party	Candidate	Votes	%	±%	Expenditures
Bloc Québécois	Gérard Asselin	19,040	58.51	+0.31	$55,674
Liberal	Anthony Detroio	8,097	24.88	−5.00	$50,362
New Democratic	Pierre Ducasse	3,361	10.33	+8.68	$22,691
Conservative	Pierre Paradis	1,601	4.92	−5.35	$4,449
Green	Les Parsons	444	1.36		$901
Total valid votes		32,543	100.00		
Total rejected ballots		589			
Turnout		33,132	50.86		
Electors on the lists		65,142			
Percentage change figures are factored for redistribution. Conservative Party percentages are contrasted with the combined Canadian Alliance and Progressive Conservative percentages from 2000.
Sources: Official Results, Elections Canada and Financial Returns, Elections Canada.
