= Lomer Brisson =

Canadian politician

Member of the Canadian Parliament for Saguenay
- In office 1949–1958
- Preceded by: Riding was created in 1947 from parts of Charlevoix—Saguenay
- Succeeded by: Perrault LaRue

Personal details
- Born: December 5, 1916 Grandes-Bergeronnes, Quebec, Canada
- Died: January 5, 1981 (aged 64)
- Party: Liberal
- Occupation: lawyer

Lomer Brisson (December 5, 1916 – January 5, 1981) was a Canadian politician and lawyer. He was elected to the House of Commons of Canada in the 1949 election to represent the riding of Saguenay. He was re-elected in the elections of 1953 and 1957 but defeated in 1958.
