= Saguenay (federal electoral district) =

Former federal electoral district in Quebec, Canada

Quebec electoral district

Defunct federal electoral district
- Legislature: House of Commons
- District created: 1947
- District abolished: 1967
- First contested: 1949
- Last contested: 1965

Saguenay was a federal electoral district in Quebec, Canada, that was represented in the House of Commons of Canada from 1949 to 1968.

This riding was created in 1947 from parts of Charlevoix—Saguenay riding. It consisted of:

- the county of Saguenay, (except the municipality of St. Firmin and the township of Sagard), and the towns of Baie Comeau and Forestville;
- Anticosti Island; and
- the territory of New-Quebec.

It was abolished in 1966 when it was redistributed into Abitibi, Charlevoix and Manicouagan ridings.

== Members of Parliament ==
This riding elected the following members of Parliament:

Parliament	Years	Member	Party
Saguenay; Riding created from Charlevoix—Saguenay
21st	1949–1953	Lomer Brisson	Liberal
22nd	1953–1957	Lomer Brisson	Liberal
23rd	1957–1958	Lomer Brisson	Liberal
24th	1958–1962	Perrault LaRue	Progressive Conservative
25th	1962–1963	Lauréat Maltais	Social Credit
26th	1963–1965	Gustave Blouin	Liberal
27th	1965–1968	Gustave Blouin	Liberal
Riding dissolved into Abitibi, Charlevoix and Manicouagan

== Election results ==
1949 Canadian federal election
Party	Candidate	Votes
Liberal	Lomer Brisson	6,113
Progressive Conservative	Frédéric Dorion	5,651
Union des électeurs	Madame Victor Gladu	889

1953 Canadian federal election
Party	Candidate	Votes
Liberal	Lomer Brisson	7,815
Progressive Conservative	Wilbrod Langlais	7,464

1957 Canadian federal election
Party	Candidate	Votes
Liberal	Lomer Brisson	11,408
Progressive Conservative	Wilbrod Langlais	8,191

1958 Canadian federal election
Party	Candidate	Votes
Progressive Conservative	Perrault LaRue	13,194
Liberal	Lomer Brisson	11,330

1962 Canadian federal election
Party	Candidate	Votes
Social Credit	Lauréat Maltais	15,992
Liberal	Réal Therrien	10,210
Progressive Conservative	Bernard Flynn	6,168

1963 Canadian federal election
Party	Candidate	Votes
Liberal	Gustave Blouin	13,896
Social Credit	Lauréat Maltais	13,261
Progressive Conservative	Louis-Edmond St-Laurent	3,240
New Democratic	Raymond Lapointe	2,036

1965 Canadian federal election
Party	Candidate	Votes
Liberal	Gustave Blouin	15,062
Ralliement créditiste	Jean-Nil Jean	8,478
New Democratic	Roger Collin	5,019
Progressive Conservative	Bernard Coté	4,348

== See also ==
- List of Canadian electoral districts
- Historical federal electoral districts of Canada
