= Xavier Barsalou-Duval =

Canadian politician (born 1988)

Xavier Barsalou-Duval MP
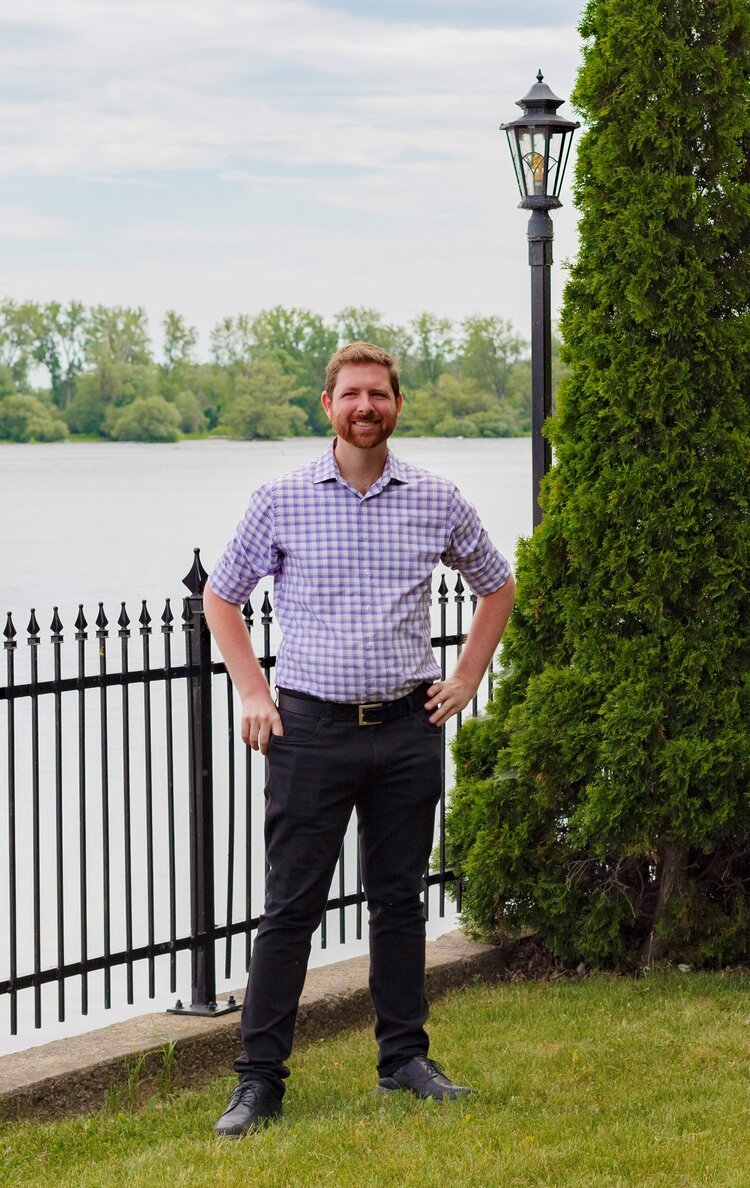

Member of Parliament for Pierre-Boucher—Les Patriotes—Verchères
- Incumbent
- Assumed office October 19, 2015
- Preceded by: Sana Hassainia

Personal details
- Born: November 10, 1988 (age 37) Boucherville, Quebec
- Party: Bloc Québécois, Parti Québécois (provincial)
- Spouse: Marilène Gill
- Children: 1
- Education: Université du Québec à Trois-Rivières
- Profession: Auditor, teacher

Xavier Barsalou-Duval MP (born November 10, 1988) is a Canadian politician who was elected to represent the riding of Pierre-Boucher—Les Patriotes—Verchères in the House of Commons in the 2015 federal election.

== Political career ==
He was president of the Forum jeunesse du Bloc Québécois from 2011 to 2015 and campaigned for Mario Beaulieu in the 2014 leadership race.

He was elected with the lowest percentage of the vote of any Member of Parliament in 2015, gaining only 28.6% of the vote due to vote splitting and a close race in his riding.

Barsalou-Duval was one of three Bloc MPs who supported Martine Ouellet's leadership during a caucus revolt and remained with the Bloc caucus when seven MPs resigned on February 28, 2018 to sit as Independents.

He served as the critic of transport, infrastructure and communities in the Bloc Québécois Shadow Cabinet of the 44th Parliament of Canada.

He was elected vice chair of the Canadian House of Commons Standing Committee on Transport, Infrastructure and Communities and the Standing Joint Committee on Scrutiny of Regulations in the 45th Canadian Parliament in 2025.

== Electoral record ==
2025 Canadian federal election: Pierre-Boucher—Les Patriotes—Verchères
Party	Candidate	Votes	%	±%	Expenditures
Bloc Québécois	Xavier Barsalou-Duval	28,765	46.08	−8.18	$62,736.56
Liberal	Laurent de Casanove	24,217	38.79	+12.94	$6,214.22
Conservative	Vincent Kunda	7,375	11.81	+2.99	$6.40
New Democratic	Jean-François Filion	1,541	2.47	−5.24	$557.39
People's	Alexandre Blais	528	0.85	−1.10	$0.00
Total valid votes/expense limit		62,426	98.74	–	$129,219.48
Total rejected ballots		796	1.26		
Turnout		63,222	76.44		
Eligible voters		82,705			
Bloc Québécois hold		Swing		−10.56	
Source: Elections Canada
Note: number of eligible voters does not include voting day registrations.

2021 Canadian federal election: Pierre-Boucher—Les Patriotes—Verchères
Party	Candidate	Votes	%	±%	Expenditures
Bloc Québécois	Xavier Barsalou-Duval	29,978	54.3	+3.3	$51,318.92
Liberal	Louis-Gabriel Girard	14,282	25.9	-2.6	$12.402.87
Conservative	Jérôme Painchaud	4,870	8.8	+0.7	$3,365.80
New Democratic	Martin Leprohon	4,261	7.7	+0.8	$3,545.23
People's	Alexandre Blais	1,078	2.0	+1.4	$0.00
Free	Carole Boisvert	777	1.4	N/A	$2,993.68
Total valid votes/expense limit		55,246	98.3	–	$111,688.77
Total rejected ballots		964	1.7		
Turnout		56,210	69.0		
Registered voters		81,525			
Bloc Québécois hold		Swing		+3.0	
Source: Elections Canada

2019 Canadian federal election: Pierre-Boucher—Les Patriotes—Verchères
Party	Candidate	Votes	%	±%	Expenditures
Bloc Québécois	Xavier Barsalou-Duval	31,009	51.02	+22.45	$49,162.26
Liberal	Simon Chalifoux	17,333	28.52	+0.24	$43,167.10
Conservative	Mathieu Daviault	4,910	8.07	-2.17	$10,470.70
New Democratic	Sean English	4,192	6.90	-17.44	$478.92
Green	Dany Gariépy	2,955	4.86	-3.65	$1,043.42
People's	Clifford Albert	384	0.63	–	$1,870.53
Total valid votes/expense limit		60,783	100.0		
Total rejected ballots		913			
Turnout		61,696	76.29	-0.04	
Eligible voters		80,864			
Bloc Québécois hold		Swing		+11.07	
Source: Elections Canada

2015 Canadian federal election: Pierre-Boucher—Les Patriotes—Verchères
Party	Candidate	Votes	%	±%	Expenditures
Bloc Québécois	Xavier Barsalou-Duval	17,007	28.64	-7.78	
Liberal	Lucie Gagnon	16,794	28.28	+18.4	
New Democratic	Raphaël Fortin	14,454	24.34	-19.01	
Conservative	Clovis Maheux	6,079	10.24	+1.84	
Green	JiCi Lauzon	5,056	8.51	+6.4	
Total valid votes/Expense limit		59.390	100.00		
Total rejected ballots		800	1.33	-0.19	
Turnout		60,190	76.4	+4.84	
Eligible voters		78,738	–	–	
