= Bernard St-Laurent (politician) =

Canadian politician

Member of Parliament for Manicouagan
- In office 1993–1997
- Preceded by: Charles Langlois
- Succeeded by: Ghislain Fournier

Personal details
- Born: 14 December 1953 Arvida, Quebec, Canada
- Died: 22 January 2015 (aged 61)
- Party: Bloc Québécois
- Profession: Public servant, correctional worker

Bernard St-Laurent (14 December 1953 – 22 January 2015) was a member of the House of Commons of Canada from 1993 to 1997. He has worked for government and correctional facilities.

He was elected in the Manicouagan electoral district under the Bloc Québécois party in the 1993 federal election, thus he served in the 35th Canadian Parliament. He did not seek a second term in office and therefore left Canadian politics following the 1997 federal election.

St-Laurent died on 22 January 2015.
