= Charles Langlois (politician) =

Canadian politician (born 1938)

Member of the Canadian Parliament for Manicouagan
- In office 1988–1993
- Preceded by: Brian Mulroney
- Succeeded by: Bernard St-Laurent

Personal details
- Born: Charles A. Langlois; 22 March 1938 (age 88) Sainte-Marthe, Quebec, Canada
- Party: Progressive Conservative
- Spouse(s): Edna O'Brien (m. 10 June 1962)
- Committees: Chair, Standing Committee on Energy, Mines and Resources (1989–1991); Chair, Standing Committee on House Management (1991–1993); Vice-Chair, Standing Committee on House Management (1991–1993)
- Portfolio: Parliamentary Secretary to the Minister of Industry, Science and Technology (1991–1993); Parliamentary Secretary to the Leader of the Government in the House of Commons (1993); Parliamentary Secretary to the Minister of National Defence (1993); Parliamentary Secretary to the Solicitor General of Canada (1993); Parliamentary Secretary to the Leader of the Government in the House of Commons (1993)

Charles A. Langlois (French pronunciation: [ʃaʁl lɑ̃ɡlwa]; born 22 March 1938) was a member of the House of Commons of Canada from 1988 to 1993. His background was in administration.

Langlois was born in Sainte-Marthe-de-Gaspé, Quebec and was educated at Collège Notre-Dame-des-Champs. He was elected in the 1988 federal election at the Manicouagan electoral district for the Progressive Conservative Party. He succeeded Prime Minister Brian Mulroney, who ran and was elected in the Charlevoix riding instead. Langlois held membership in the provincial Quebec Liberal Party at the time, but encouraged federal voters in Quebec to "elect a member on the government side" namely the Progressive Conservatives under Mulroney. He served in the 34th Canadian Parliament, after which he lost his seat to Bloc Québécois candidate Bernard St-Laurent in the 1993 federal election.
