= Jonathan Genest-Jourdain =

Canadian politician

Member of Parliament for Manicouagan
- In office May 2, 2011 – October 19, 2015
- Preceded by: Gérard Asselin
- Succeeded by: Marilène Gill

Personal details
- Born: July 16, 1979 (age 47) Uashat-Maliotenam, Quebec
- Party: New Democratic Party
- Education: Université Laval
- Profession: Lawyer

Jonathan Genest-Jourdain (born July 16, 1979) is a Canadian politician from Quebec. Genest-Jourdain served as the New Democratic Party Member of Parliament for Manicouagan and as a member of the Official Opposition Shadow Cabinet in the 41st Canadian Parliament (2011–2015).

== Career ==
Jonathan Genest-Jourdain entered municipal politics in Sept-Îles, Quebec, in 2009. Through his legal work, Genest-Jourdain has been an ardent activist for Aboriginal, Quebec and Canadian heritage issues.

Genest-Jourdain defeated Bloc Québécois incumbent MP Gérard Asselin at the 2011 Canadian federal election, becoming the first ever NDP member to represent the Manicouagan riding. Along with fellow NDP member Romeo Saganash (who was elected for Abitibi—Baie-James—Nunavik—Eeyou), Genest-Jourdain was one of two First Nations members currently representing Quebec in the House of Commons of Canada. He was a member of the Canadian House of Commons Standing Committee on Aboriginal Affairs and Northern Development.

A member of the Innu Nation, Genest-Jourdain is a lawyer originally from the reserve village of Uashat-Maliotenam located in the Sept-Rivières Regional County Municipality. Genest-Jourdain obtained a law degree from Université Laval in 2004 and started a graduate certificate in corporate law. He has been a member of the Bar of Quebec since 2007. Genest-Jourdain has devoted himself to the application of professional principles, including social intervention.

Genest-Jourdain supported Outremont MP Tom Mulcair's candidacy for federal leadership of the NDP to succeed the late Jack Layton.

Genest-Jourdain finished third in his own riding of Manicouagan in the 2015 Canadian federal election, with the Bloc's Marilène Gill succeeding him as MP.

== Shadow Cabinet ==
Shortly after Genest-Jourdain entered Parliament in May 2011, NDP leader Jack Layton appointed him to the shadow cabinet as Deputy Critic for Aboriginal Affairs and Northern Development.

== Election record ==
2015 Canadian federal election: Manicouagan
Party	Candidate	Votes	%	±%	Expenditures
Bloc Québécois	Marilène Gill	17,338	41.25	+8.57	$19,611.43
Liberal	Mario Tremblay	12,343	29.37	+23.86	$9,363.37
New Democratic	Jonathan Genest-Jourdain	7,359	17.51	-30.17	$24,554.75
Conservative	Yvon Boudreau	4,317	10.27	-1.36	$16,863.38
Green	Nathan Grills	673	1.60	-0.91	–
Total valid votes/Expense limit		42,030	100.00		$259,798.61
Total rejected ballots		645	1.51	–	
Turnout		75,030	56.88	–	
Eligible voters		75,030			
Bloc Québécois gain from New Democratic		Swing		+19.37	
Source: Elections Canada

2011 Canadian federal election
Party	Candidate	Votes	%	±%	Expenditures
New Democratic	Jonathan Genest-Jourdain	16,438	48.93%	+44.13%	
Bloc Québécois	Gérard Asselin	10,496	31.25%	-18.05%	
Conservative	Gordon Ferguson	3,879	11.55%	-15.45%	
Liberal	André Forbes (Note: André Forbes was nominated as a Liberal, but lost party support just before the nomination deadline. Instead of resigning, he continued to run as an Independent. He appears on the ballot as a Liberal.)	1,881	5.6%	-9.7%	
Green	Jacques Gélineau	898	2.67%	-0.93%	
Total valid votes/Expense limit		33,592	100.0%		
