= Ghislain Fournier =

Canadian politician

Ghislain Fournier (born 26 August 1938) was a member of the House of Commons of Canada from 1997 to 2004. He is a businessman by career, including real estate work.

He was elected in the Manicouagan electoral district under the Bloc Québécois party in the 1997 and 2000 elections, serving in the 36th and 37th Canadian Parliaments respectively.

Fournier left office in 2004, as he lost the Manicouagan riding's Bloc Québécois candidacy to Gérard Asselin. Asselin won the riding in that year's Canadian general election.

Parliament of Canada
Preceded by Bernard St-Laurent	Member of Parliament for Manicouagan; 1997–2004	Succeeded by Gérard Asselin
