= New Democratic Party of Quebec (2014) =

Provincial political party in Canada

New Democratic Party of Quebec Nouveau Parti démocratique du Québec
- Abbreviation: NDPQ; NPDQ
- Leader: Raphaël Fortin (last)
- President: Raymond Côté (last)
- Founded: 30 January 2014; 12 years ago
- Dissolved: 31 December 2024; 21 months ago
- Preceded by: Parti de la Democratie Socialiste
- Headquarters: Montreal, Quebec, Canada
- Ideology: Social democracy; Canadian federalism
- Political position: Centre-left
- Colours: Orange; purple; white

Website
- lenpdq.com

The New Democratic Party of Quebec (NDPQ; French: Nouveau Parti démocratique du Québec, (Note: Pronounced [nuvo paʁti demɔkʁatik dy kebɛk].) NPDQ) was a minor federalist and social-democratic provincial political party in Quebec, Canada. The party was a revival of the comparable New Democratic Party of Quebec, which existed in various forms as the federal New Democratic Party (NDP)'s provincial section in Quebec from 1963 to 1991. This party, however, was never connected with the federal NDP. The modern party was registered on 30 January 2014. The party announced that it would dissolve at the end of 2024, after a decision taken by its members at a special meeting on 6 November.

== History ==
=== First iteration ===
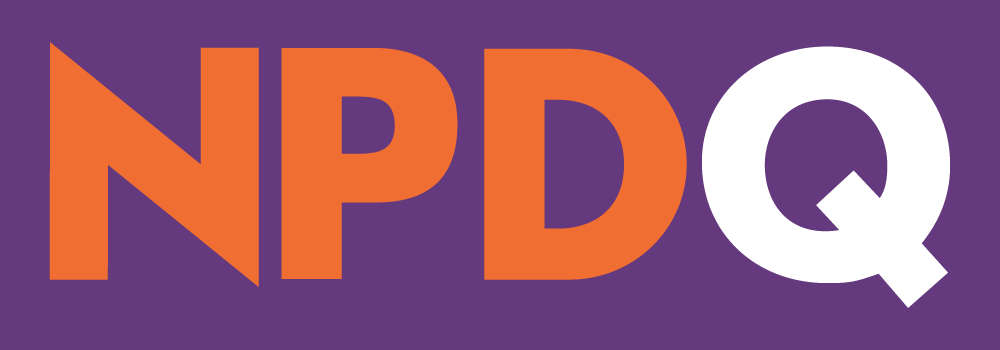
First logo of the revived NPDQ

The original New Democratic Party of Quebec emerged from the Parti social démocratique du Québec, the Quebec section of the Cooperative Commonwealth Federation. Aside from briefly electing a single member to the National Assembly (David Côté), it only played a minor role in Quebec provincial politics. During the late 1980s, it came under the leadership of radical sovereigntists, prompting a rupture from the federal NDP. It voted to disaffiliate from the federal party in 1989 and changed its name to the Parti de la democratie socialiste (PDS) in 1994. The PDS would later become a founding member of Québec solidaire, a left-wing provincial party with a sovereigntist platform.

=== Second iteration ===
For the following two decades, the NDP remained moribund in Quebec; indeed, it was the only province where the NDP was not fully organized. Unlike other national parties in Canada, the NDP is fully integrated with its provincial and territorial branches.

During the 2006 convention of the federal NDP, held in Quebec City, the idea of recreating the provincial NPDQ was brought up. However, the idea failed to win support at the New Democratic Party-Quebec Section's convention in November 2006 in Saint-Jérôme. However, gains by the federal party— at first modest with the 2007 by-election in which Tom Mulcair gained the House of Commons seat in Outremont and then dramatic "Orange Surge" of the 2011 Canadian federal election— led to renewed calls for a provincial NDP in Quebec as an alternative to the federalist Quebec Liberal Party and the sovereigntist Parti Quebecois.

On 17 August 2012, federal NDP leader Mulcair announced that, while the NDP was unable to organize for the (then on-going) 2012 election, the NDP intended to run candidates in the next provincial election (then tentatively scheduled for 2016). However, by November 2012, Mulcair had changed his mind, believing that dividing the party's efforts between federal and provincial politics would be "extremely perilous." The president of the Quebec Section, André St-Hilaire, agreed with his concerns, arguing their first priority was electing a federal NDP government.

Nevertheless, NDP activists remained interested in establishing a provincial party. On 29 April 2013, the name "Nouveau Parti démocratique du Québec" was reserved with Élections Québec by Pierre Ducasse, Jack Layton's former Quebec lieutenant. Ducasse said it was "not in the plans" to have a structural link to the federal party, and the NDP's deputy national director confirmed they were not involved in reserving the name. On 30 January 2014, the New Democratic Party of Quebec was registered as a provincial party with Élections Québec. Ducasse was listed as the party leader. The party did not stand any candidates in the general election later that year.

The first election the NPDQ contested was the 2 October 2017 by-election in Louis-Hébert. Their candidate, former MP Denis Blanchette, placed seventh with 1.35% of the vote.

Interim leader Pierre Ducasse had announced he would not be a candidate in the party's 2018 leadership election. The campaign period began on 1 September 2017 and the nomination deadline for leadership candidates was 20 October 2017. On 21 January 2018, the party leadership contest elected Raphaël Fortin as leader.

=== 2018 campaign: Re-establishing the party ===
For the 2018 provincial election, the NPDQ sought to re-establish a presence in the province by running a small campaign that focused on Fortin as leader. Able to run only 59 candidates across the province, the party aimed to influence the discussion and gain attention for a party that had not been present in the province for over two decades. Fortin, speaking with media, said that he had instructed his candidates to not, “look at the final results; look at your campaign and how many people you reach.”

During the campaign, the NPDQ maintained similar policies to those of Québec Solidaire, such as supporting a guaranteed minimum income and universal daycare and post-secondary, though it asserted it was a staunchly federalist party.

Federal New Democratic leader Jagmeet Singh did not endorse the provincial party during the campaign.

== Election results ==
Election	Leader	Candidates	Votes	%	Seats	+/–	Place	Position
2018	Raphaël Fortin	59 / 125	22,863	0.57	0 / 125	Steady	▲7th	No seats

The party did not run candidates in the 2022 Quebec general election.

== Leaders of the NPD-Québec ==
- Pierre Ducasse (2014–2018) (as interim leader)
- Raphaël Fortin (2018–2024)

== Party Presidents of NPD-Québec ==
- Jonathan Leduc
- Mona Belleau
- Raymond Côté (until 2024)

== See also ==
- 2018 New Democratic Party of Quebec leadership election
- Politics of Quebec
- List of Quebec general elections
- National Assembly of Quebec
- Timeline of Quebec history
- List of political parties in Quebec
