= Forum jeunesse du Bloc québécois =

Youth wing of the Bloc Québécois

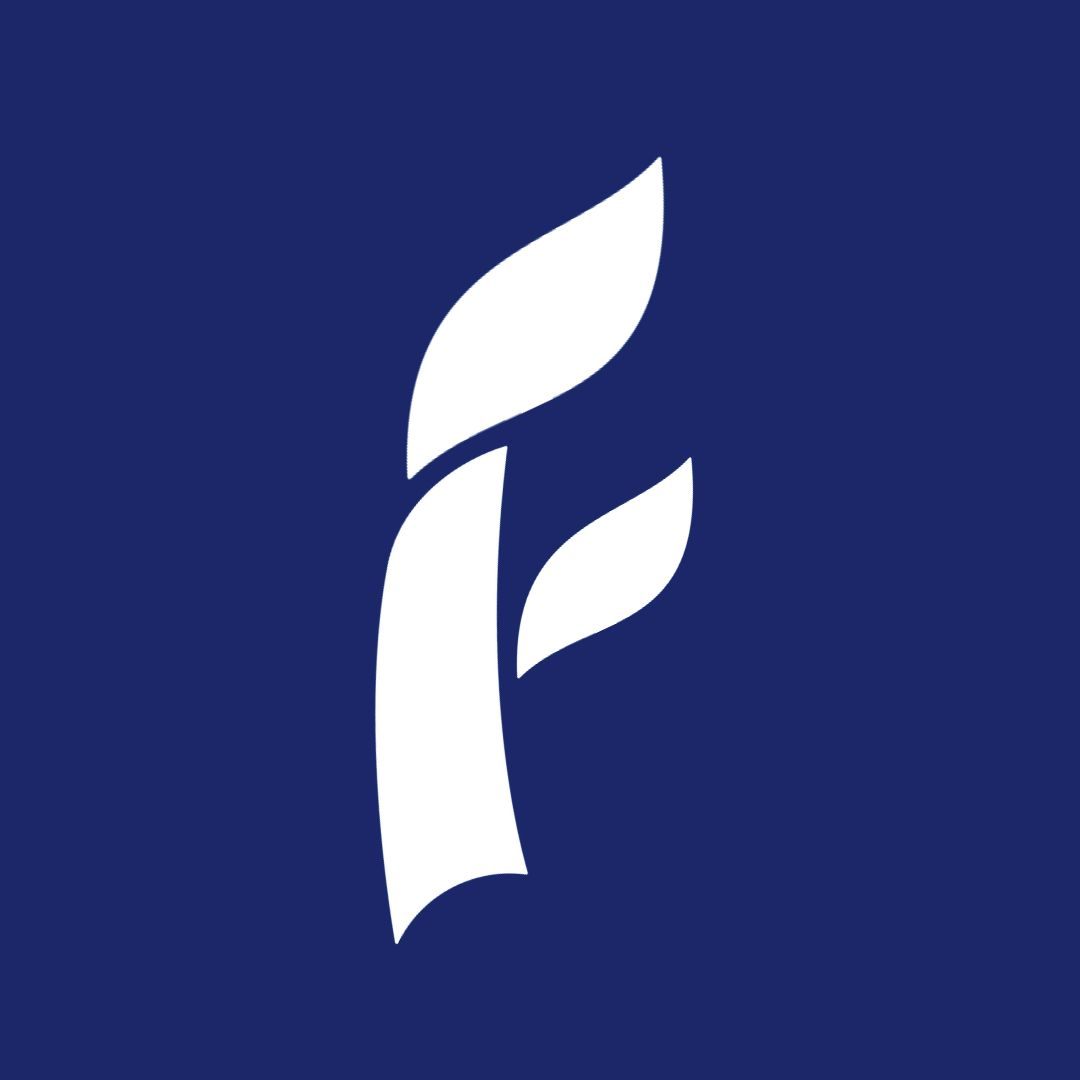
- President: Pauline Postel
- Affiliations: Bloc Québécois
- Website: fjbq.org

The Forum jeunesse du Bloc québécois (English: Youth Forum of the Bloc Québécois), or FJBQ, is the youth wing of Canada's Quebec sovereigntist federal political party, the Bloc Québécois. It is composed of members of the Bloc Québécois from the ages of 14 to 30. The current president of the FJBQ is Pauline Postel.
