= Gérard Asselin =

Canadian politician

Member of Parliament for Manicouagan
- In office 28 July 2004 – 2 May 2011
- Preceded by: Ghislain Fournier
- Succeeded by: Jonathan Genest-Jourdain

Member of Parliament for Charlevoix
- In office 25 October 1993 – 28 July 2004
- Preceded by: Brian Mulroney
- Succeeded by: riding abolished

Personal details
- Born: April 19, 1950 Sainte-Flavie, Quebec
- Died: February 9, 2013 (aged 62)
- Party: Bloc Québécois
- Spouse: Diane Gaudreault
- Profession: Foreman

Gérard Asselin (born April 19, 1950 in Sainte-Flavie, Quebec - February 9, 2013) was a Canadian politician who was a Bloc Québécois member of the House of Commons of Canada, representing the riding of Manicouagan from 2004 to 2011 and Charlevoix from 1993 to 2004.

== Career ==
Asselin was a foreman, and was previously a city councillor in Baie-Comeau, Quebec from 1979 to 1993.

In his first run for federal office, in 1993, Asselin won the riding of former Prime Minister Brian Mulroney in a landslide, finishing 16,500 votes ahead of his closest opponent. The Tory candidate finished a distant third, and nearly lost his deposit. Asselin was re-elected almost as easily in every election until losing to NDP challenger Jonathan Genest-Jourdain in 2011.

Asselin was one of the party's few more socially conservative members. In 2005, Asselin joined six other Bloc Québécois members opposing Bill C-38, which extended marriage rights to same-sex couples in Canada. At the end of the 37th Canadian Parliament, Asselin was the Bloc's Forestry critic. He also served as Natural Resources Critic.

== Electoral record (partial) ==
2006 Canadian federal election: Manicouagan
Party	Candidate	Votes	%	±%	Expenditures
Bloc Québécois	Gérard Asselin	18,601	51.10	−7.41	$57,481
Conservative	Pierre Paradis	6,910	18.98	+14.06	$10,185
Liberal	Randy Jones	5,214	14.32	−10.56	$21,522
New Democratic	Pierre Ducasse	4,657	12.79	+2.46	$19,632
Green	Jacques Gélineau	824	2.26	+0.90	$373
Independent	Eric Vivier	195	0.54		none listed
Total valid votes		36,401	100.00		
Total rejected ballots		388			
Turnout		36,789	57.00	+6.14	
Electors on the lists		64,537			
Sources: Official Results, Elections Canada and Financial Returns, Elections Canada.

2004 Canadian federal election: Manicouagan
Party	Candidate	Votes	%	±%	Expenditures
Bloc Québécois	Gérard Asselin	19,040	58.51	+0.31	$55,674
Liberal	Anthony Detroio	8,097	24.88	−5.00	$50,362
New Democratic	Pierre Ducasse	3,361	10.33	+8.68	$22,691
Conservative	Pierre Paradis	1,601	4.92	−5.35	$4,449
Green	Les Parsons	444	1.36		$901
Total valid votes		32,543	100.00		
Total rejected ballots		589			
Turnout		33,132	50.86		
Electors on the lists		65,142			
Percentage change figures are factored for redistribution. Conservative Party percentages are contrasted with the combined Canadian Alliance and Progressive Conservative percentages from 2000.
Sources: Official Results, Elections Canada and Financial Returns, Elections Canada.

2000 Canadian federal election: Charlevoix
Party	Candidate	Votes	%	±%	Expenditures
Bloc Québécois	Gérard Asselin	20,479	61.44		$74,392
Liberal	Marjolaine Gagnon	9,308	27.93	–	$36,028
Alliance	Pierre Paradis	1,905	5.72		$10,782
Progressive Conservative	Doris Grondin	1,154	3.46		$91
New Democratic	Joss Duhaime	484	1.45		$180
Total valid votes		33,330	100.00		
Total rejected ballots		923			
Turnout		34,253	58.32		
Electors on the lists		58,737			
Sources: Official Results, Elections Canada and Financial Returns, Elections Canada.
