= Marilène Gill =

Canadian politician

Marilène Gill MP

Member of Parliament for Côte-Nord—Kawawachikamach—Nitassinan Manicouagan (2015–2025)
- Incumbent
- Assumed office October 19, 2015
- Preceded by: Jonathan Genest-Jourdain

Personal details
- Born: 1977 (age 48–49) Sorel, Quebec, Canada
- Party: Bloc Québécois
- Spouse: Xavier Barsalou-Duval
- Children: 3
- Profession: Author, politician

Marilène Gill MP (born 1977, French pronunciation: [maʁilɛn ʒil]) is a Canadian politician who was elected to the House of Commons in the 2015 federal election, where she represents the riding of Côte-Nord—Kawawachikamach—Nitassinan as a member of the Bloc Québécois (BQ).

== Political career ==
Since 2021 she has served as Deputy whip and critic of indigenous and northern affairs in the Bloc Québécois Shadow Cabinet.

She was elected vice chair of the Canadian House of Commons Standing Committee on Human Resources, Skills and Social Development and the Status of Persons with Disabilities in the 45th Canadian Parliament in 2025.

== Political positions ==
Gill was one of three BQ Members of Parliament (MPs) who supported Martine Ouellet's leadership during a caucus revolt and remained with the caucus when seven MPs resigned on February 28, 2018 to sit as Independents.

== Personal life ==
Gill is married to fellow BQ MP Xavier Barsalou-Duval. At the time of the 2025 Canadian federal election, she lived in Pointe-Lebel, Quebec.

== Electoral record ==
2025 Canadian federal election: Côte-Nord—Kawawachikamach—Nitassinan
Party	Candidate	Votes	%	±%	Expenditures
Bloc Québécois	Marilène Gill	16,243	43.68	-8.95	$32,437.49
Liberal	Kevin Coutu	10,185	27.39	+8.69	$5,654.75
Conservative	Mélanie Dorion	9,365	25.19	+3.36	$12,371.41
New Democratic	Marika Lalime	640	1.72	-2.59	$0.00
Rhinoceros	Sébastien Beaulieu	557	1.50	N/A	$98.87
No affiliation	Gilles Babin	193	0.52	N/A	none listed
Total valid votes/expense limit		37,183	98.58	–	$159,405.80
Total rejected ballots		535	1.42		
Turnout		37,718	52.94		
Eligible voters		71,249			
Bloc Québécois hold		Swing		-8.82	
Source: Elections Canada
Note: number of eligible voters does not include voting day registrations.

2021 Canadian federal election: Manicouagan
Party	Candidate	Votes	%	±%	Expenditures
Bloc Québécois	Marilène Gill	18,419	52.6	-1.3	$15,653.33
Conservative	Rodrigue Vigneault	7,640	21.8	+2.6	$15,143.67
Liberal	Thomas Gagné	6,545	18.7	-0.6	$11,042.69
New Democratic	Nichola Saint-Jean	1,509	4.3	+0.6	$0.00
Free	Blanca Girard	887	2.5	N/A	$950.51
Total valid votes/expense limit		35,000	97.5	–	$134,113.27
Total rejected ballots		904	2.5		
Turnout		35,904	50.2		
Registered voters		71,535			
Bloc Québécois hold		Swing		-2.0	
Source: Elections Canada

2019 Canadian federal election: Manicouagan
Party	Candidate	Votes	%	±%	Expenditures
Bloc Québécois	Marilène Gill	21,768	53.90	+12.65	$18,875.24
Liberal	Dave Savard	7,793	19.29	-10.08	$36,651.32
Conservative	François Corriveau	7,771	19.24	+8.97	$30,489.35
New Democratic	Colleen McCool	1,482	3.67	-13.84	$0.33
Green	Jacques Gélineau	1,293	3.20	+1.6	none listed
People's	Gabriel Côté	283	0.70		none listed
Total valid votes/expense limit		40,390	100.0		
Total rejected ballots		712			
Turnout		41,102	56.9		
Eligible voters		72,256			
Bloc Québécois hold		Swing		+11.37	
Source: Elections Canada

2015 Canadian federal election: Manicouagan
Party	Candidate	Votes	%	±%	Expenditures
Bloc Québécois	Marilène Gill	17,338	41.25	+8.57	$19,611.43
Liberal	Mario Tremblay	12,343	29.37	+23.86	$9,363.37
New Democratic	Jonathan Genest-Jourdain	7,359	17.51	-30.17	$24,554.75
Conservative	Yvon Boudreau	4,317	10.27	-1.36	$16,863.38
Green	Nathan Grills	673	1.60	-0.91	–
Total valid votes/Expense limit		42,030	100.00		$259,798.61
Total rejected ballots		645	1.51	–	
Turnout		75,030	56.88	–	
Eligible voters		75,030			
Bloc Québécois gain from New Democratic		Swing		+19.37	
Source: Elections Canada
