= Pointe-Lebel =

- Village municipality
- Location in Côte-Nord region of Quebec
- Coordinates: 49°10′N 68°12′W
- Country: Canada
- Province: Quebec
- Region: Côte-Nord
- RCM: Manicouagan
- Constituted: January 1, 1964

Government
  - Mayor: Michelle Martin
  - Federal riding: Côte-Nord—Kawawachikamach—Nitassinan
  - Prov. riding: René-Lévesque

Area
  - Total: 122.24 km^{2} (47.20 sq mi)
  - Land: 85.54 km^{2} (33.03 sq mi)

Population (2021)
  - Total: 1,817
  - Density: 21.2/km^{2} (55/sq mi)
  - Pop (2016-21): ▼5.3%
  - Dwellings: 935
- Time zone: UTC−5 (EST)
  - Summer (DST): UTC−4 (EDT)
- Postal code(s): G0H 1N0
- Area codes: 418 and 581
- Highways: R-138
- Website: www.pointe-lebel.com

Pointe-Lebel (French pronunciation: [pwɛ̃t ləbɛl]) is a village municipality in the Côte-Nord region of Quebec, Canada. Its territory makes up the western half of the Manicouagan Peninsula between the mouths of the Outardes and Manicouagan Rivers.

== Demographics ==
In the 2021 Census of Population conducted by Statistics Canada, Pointe-Lebel had a population of 1,817 living in 857 of its 935 total private dwellings, a change of −5.3% from its 2016 population of 1,918. With a land area of 85.54 km^{2} (33.03 sq mi), it had a population density of 21.2/km^{2} (55.0/sq mi) in 2021.

Population trend:

Historical census populations – Pointe-Lebel

Year	Pop.	±%
1966	695	—
1971	756	+8.8%
1976	1,302	+72.2%
1981	1,573	+20.8%
1986	1,709	+8.6%
1991	1,818	+6.4%

Year	Pop.	±%
1996	2,011	+10.6%
2001	1,931	−4.0%
2006	1,958	+1.4%
2011	1,973	+0.8%
2016	1,918	−2.8%
2021	1,817	−5.3%

Source: Statistics Canada

Mother tongue (2021):

- English as first language: 0.6%
- French as first language: 98.6%
- English and French as first language: 0.6%
- Other as first language: 0.3%
