= André Maltais =

Canadian politician

André Maltais (born 17 May 1948) is a Canadian educator and former politician. Maltais was a Liberal member of the House of Commons of Canada.

Born in La Malbaie, Quebec, Maltais won the Quebec riding of Manicouagan in the 1979 federal election and was re-elected there in 1980. Maltais served in the 31st and 32nd Canadian Parliaments. He lost his seat to Progressive Conservative leader Brian Mulroney in the 1984 election, at which Mulroney also became Prime Minister of Canada.

Maltais has not been elected to any office since his defeat in 1984. He attempted a parliamentary comeback at Manicouagan in the 1997 federal election.

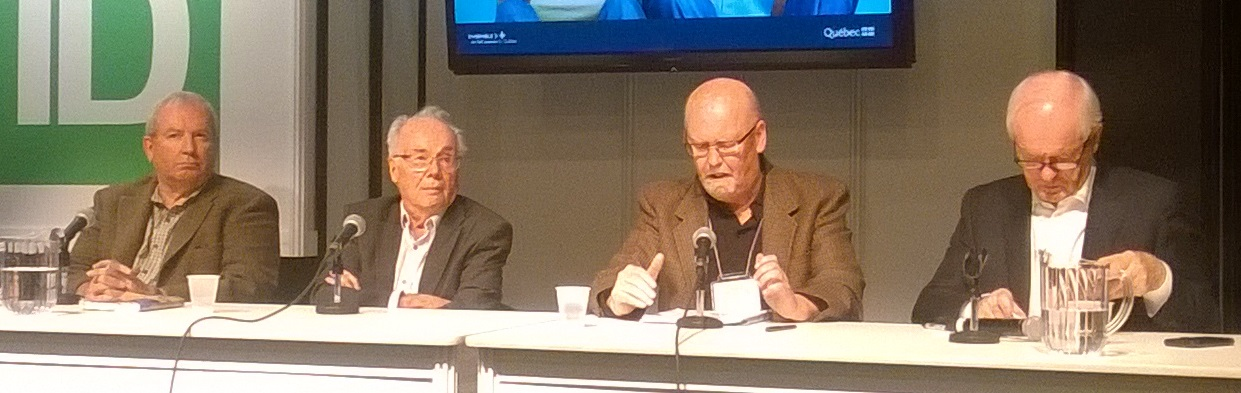
André Maltais and others at the Salon du livre de Montréal, 2017.
