= Pierre-Boucher—Les Patriotes—Verchères =

Federal electoral district in Quebec, Canada

Coordinates: 45°41′30″N 73°14′0″W

Quebec electoral district
- Interactive map of riding boundaries from the 2015 federal election

Federal electoral district
- Legislature: House of Commons
MP
Xavier Barsalou-Duval
Bloc Québécois
- District created: 2013
- First contested: 2015
- Last contested: 2021
- District webpage: profile, map

Demographics
- Population (2011): 95,326
- Electors (2011): 78,251
- Area (km²): 688
- Pop. density (per km²): 138.6
- Census division(s): Longueuil, Marguerite-D'Youville, La Vallée-du-Richelieu
- Census subdivision(s): Boucherville, Varennes, Saint-Amable, Contrecœur, Verchères, Saint-Mathieu-de-Beloeil, Saint-Denis-sur-Richelieu, Saint-Marc-sur-Richelieu, Saint-Antoine-sur-Richelieu, Saint-Charles-sur-Richelieu

Pierre-Boucher—Les Patriotes—Verchères is a federal electoral district in Quebec. It encompasses a portion of Quebec that had been included in the electoral districts of Longueuil—Pierre-Boucher and Verchères—Les Patriotes.

Pierre-Boucher—Les Patriotes—Verchères was created by the 2012 federal electoral boundaries redistribution and was legally defined in the 2013 representation order. It came into effect upon the call of the 2015 federal election, held 19 October 2015.

The riding was supposed to be named Boucher—Les Patriotes—Verchères.

== Profile ==
The Bloc Québécois has traditionally drawn stronger support in the northern, more rural, areas of the riding (such as Varennes or Saint-Amable) while the other parties (mainly the Liberals, but also the NDP) have drawn their support more in the south, especially in the suburban city of Boucherville.

During the 2015 election the elected Member of Parliament (MP) Xavier Barsalou-Duval has the dubious distinction of being the MP elected with the smallest percentage of the popular vote receiving just 28.6% of the vote.

== Demographics ==
According to the 2016 Canadian census

- Languages: (2016) 95.0% French, 1.7% English, 0.8% Spanish, 0.4% Arabic, 0.4% Italian, 0.2% Portuguese, 0.1% Romanian, 0.1% Mandarin, 0.1% Creole, 0.1% Russian, 0.1% Polish, 0.1% German, 0.1% Persian, 0.1% Greek

== Members of Parliament ==
This riding has elected the following members of Parliament:

Parliament	Years	Member	Party
Pierre-Boucher—Les Patriotes—Verchères; Riding created from Longueuil—Pierre-Boucher and Verchères—Les Patriotes
42nd	2015–2019	Xavier Barsalou-Duval	Bloc Québécois
43rd	2019–2021	Xavier Barsalou-Duval	Bloc Québécois
44th	2021–2025	Xavier Barsalou-Duval	Bloc Québécois
45th	2025–present	Xavier Barsalou-Duval	Bloc Québécois

== Election results ==
2025 Canadian federal election
Party	Candidate	Votes	%	±%	Expenditures
Bloc Québécois	Xavier Barsalou-Duval	28,765	46.08	−8.18	
Liberal	Laurent de Casanove	24,217	38.79	+12.94	
Conservative	Vincent Kunda	7,375	11.81	+2.99	
New Democratic	Jean-François Filion	1,541	2.47	−5.24	
People's	Alexandre Blais	528	0.85	−1.10	
Total valid votes/expense limit		62,426	98.74		
Total rejected ballots		796	1.26		
Turnout		63,222	76.44		
Eligible voters		82,705			
Bloc Québécois hold		Swing		−10.56	
Source: Elections Canada
Note: number of eligible voters does not include voting day registrations.

2021 Canadian federal election
Party	Candidate	Votes	%	±%	Expenditures
Bloc Québécois	Xavier Barsalou-Duval	29,978	54.3	+3.3	$51,318.92
Liberal	Louis-Gabriel Girard	14,282	25.9	-2.6	$12.402.87
Conservative	Jérôme Painchaud	4,870	8.8	+0.7	$3,365.80
New Democratic	Martin Leprohon	4,261	7.7	+0.8	$3,545.23
People's	Alexandre Blais	1,078	2.0	+1.4	$0.00
Free	Carole Boisvert	777	1.4	N/A	$2,993.68
Total valid votes/expense limit		55,246	98.3	–	$111,688.77
Total rejected ballots		964	1.7		
Turnout		56,210	69.0		
Registered voters		81,525			
Bloc Québécois hold		Swing		+3.0	
Source: Elections Canada

2019 Canadian federal election
Party	Candidate	Votes	%	±%	Expenditures
Bloc Québécois	Xavier Barsalou-Duval	31,009	51.02	+22.45	$49,162.26
Liberal	Simon Chalifoux	17,333	28.52	+0.24	$43,167.10
Conservative	Mathieu Daviault	4,910	8.07	-2.17	$10,470.70
New Democratic	Sean English	4,192	6.90	-17.44	$478.92
Green	Dany Gariépy	2,955	4.86	-3.65	$1,043.42
People's	Clifford Albert	384	0.63	–	$1,870.53
Total valid votes/expense limit		60,783	100.0		
Total rejected ballots		913			
Turnout		61,696	76.29	-0.04	
Eligible voters		80,864			
Bloc Québécois hold		Swing		+11.07	
Source: Elections Canada

2015 Canadian federal election
Party	Candidate	Votes	%	±%	Expenditures
Bloc Québécois	Xavier Barsalou-Duval	17,007	28.64	-5.56	$44,026.62
Liberal	Lucie Gagnon	16,794	28.28	+18.40	$3,315.79
New Democratic	Raphaël Fortin	14,454	24.34	-20.51	$41,449.00
Conservative	Clovis Maheux	6,079	10.24	+1.82	9,312.42
Green	JiCi Lauzon	5,056	8.51	+6.40	96,350.12
Total valid votes/Expense limit		59,390	98.67		$212,667.64
Total rejected ballots		800	1.33	–	
Turnout		60,190	76.33	–	
Eligible voters		78,855			
Bloc Québécois notional gain from New Democratic		Swing		+7.47	
Source: Elections Canada

2011 federal election redistributed results
Party	Vote	%
New Democratic	23,882	44.84
Bloc Québécois	18,212	34.20
Liberal	5,263	9.88
Conservative	4,482	8.42
Green	1,125	2.11
Marxist–Leninist	292	0.55

== See also ==
- List of Canadian electoral districts
- Historical federal electoral districts of Canada
