= Côte-Nord—Kawawachikamach—Nitassinan =

Federal electoral district in Quebec, Canada

Coordinates: 51.51°N 66.14°W

Quebec electoral district
- Interactive map of riding boundaries (previously named Manicouagan) from the 2015 federal election

Federal electoral district
- Legislature: House of Commons
MP
Marilène Gill
Bloc Québécois
- District created: 1966
- First contested: 1968
- Last contested: 2025
- District webpage: profile, map

Demographics
- Population (2016): 92,518
- Electors (2019): 72,256
- Area (km²): 264,226
- Pop. density (per km²): 0.35
- Census division(s): Caniapiscau, La Haute-Côte-Nord, Manicouagan, Minganie, Sept-Rivières
- Census subdivision(s): Sept-Îles, Baie-Comeau, Port-Cartier, Havre-Saint-Pierre, Forestville, Pessamit, Fermont, Pointe-Lebel, Les Escoumins, Sacré-Coeur

Côte-Nord—Kawawachikamach—Nitassinan (formerly Manicouagan) is a federal riding in Quebec, Canada, that has been represented in the House of Commons since 1968. Since the 2015 federal election, its Member of Parliament (MP) has been Marilène Gill of the Bloc Québécois (BQ).

The riding was created in 1966 from parts of the Charlevoix and Saguenay ridings.

The neighbouring ridings are Abitibi—Baie-James—Nunavik—Eeyou, Jonquière—Hébertville—Pays-des-Bleuets, Chicoutimi—Le Fjord, Montmorency—Charlevoix, Côte-du-Sud—Rivière-du-Loup—Kataskomiq—Témiscouata, Rimouski-Neigette—Mitis—Matapédia—Les Basques, Gaspésie—Les Îles-de-la-Madeleine—Listuguj and Labrador.

This riding gained territory from Montmorency—Charlevoix—Haute-Côte-Nord during the 2012 electoral redistribution.

Following the 2022 federal electoral redistribution the riding was renamed Côte-Nord—Kawawachikamach—Nitassinan.

== Demographics ==
According to the 2021 Canadian census
Ethnic groups: 82.3% White, 16.2% Indigenous
Languages: 84.9% French, 7.1% Innu, 4.5% English
Religions: 79.4% Christian (71.3% Catholic, 1.9% Anglican, 6.2% Other), 19.6% None
Median income: $43,200 (2020)
Average income: $53,100 (2020)

== Members of Parliament ==
This riding has elected the following members of Parliament:

Parliament	Years	Member	Party
Manicouagan; Riding created from Charlevoix and Saguenay
28th	1968–1972	Gustave Blouin	Liberal
29th	1972–1974	Gustave Blouin	Liberal
30th	1974–1979	Gustave Blouin	Liberal
31st	1979–1980	André Maltais	Liberal
32nd	1980–1984	André Maltais	Liberal
33rd	1984–1988	Brian Mulroney	Progressive Conservative
34th	1988–1993	Charles Langlois	Progressive Conservative
35th	1993–1997	Bernard St-Laurent	Bloc Québécois
35th	1997–1997	Bernard St-Laurent	Independent
36th	1997–2000	Ghislain Fournier	Bloc Québécois
37th	2000–2004	Ghislain Fournier	Bloc Québécois
38th	2004–2006	Gérard Asselin	Bloc Québécois
39th	2006–2008	Gérard Asselin	Bloc Québécois
40th	2008–2011	Gérard Asselin	Bloc Québécois
41st	2011–2015	Jonathan Genest-Jourdain	New Democratic
42nd	2015–2019	Marilène Gill	Bloc Québécois
43rd	2019–2021	Marilène Gill	Bloc Québécois
44th	2021–2025	Marilène Gill	Bloc Québécois
Côte-Nord—Kawawachikamach—Nitassinan
45th	2025–present	Marilène Gill	Bloc Québécois

== Election results ==
=== Côte-Nord—Kawawachikamach—Nitassinan ===
View source data.
Graph of election results in Manicouagan (minor parties that never got 2% of the vote or didn't run consistently are omitted)

2025 Canadian federal election
Party	Candidate	Votes	%	±%	Expenditures
Bloc Québécois	Marilène Gill	16,243	43.68	-8.95	$32,437.49
Liberal	Kevin Coutu	10,185	27.39	+8.69	$5,654.75
Conservative	Mélanie Dorion	9,365	25.19	+3.36	$12,371.41
New Democratic	Marika Lalime	640	1.72	-2.59	$0.00
Rhinoceros	Sébastien Beaulieu	557	1.50	N/A	$98.87
No affiliation	Gilles Babin	193	0.52	N/A	none listed
Total valid votes/expense limit		37,183	98.58	–	$159,405.80
Total rejected ballots		535	1.42		
Turnout		37,718	52.94		
Eligible voters		71,249			
Bloc Québécois hold		Swing		-8.82	
Source: Elections Canada
Note: number of eligible voters does not include voting day registrations.

=== Manicouagan ===
2021 Canadian federal election: Manicouagan
Party	Candidate	Votes	%	±%	Expenditures
Bloc Québécois	Marilène Gill	18,419	52.6	-1.3	$15,653.33
Conservative	Rodrigue Vigneault	7,640	21.8	+2.6	$15,143.67
Liberal	Thomas Gagné	6,545	18.7	-0.6	$11,042.69
New Democratic	Nichola Saint-Jean	1,509	4.3	+0.6	$0.00
Free	Blanca Girard	887	2.5	N/A	$950.51
Total valid votes/expense limit		35,000	97.5	–	$134,113.27
Total rejected ballots		904	2.5		
Turnout		35,904	50.2		
Registered voters		71,535			
Bloc Québécois hold		Swing		-2.0	
Source: Elections Canada

2019 Canadian federal election: Manicouagan
Party	Candidate	Votes	%	±%	Expenditures
Bloc Québécois	Marilène Gill	21,768	53.90	+12.65	$18,875.24
Liberal	Dave Savard	7,793	19.29	-10.08	$36,651.32
Conservative	François Corriveau	7,771	19.24	+8.97	$30,489.35
New Democratic	Colleen McCool	1,482	3.67	-13.84	$0.33
Green	Jacques Gélineau	1,293	3.20	+1.6	none listed
People's	Gabriel Côté	283	0.70		none listed
Total valid votes/expense limit		40,390	100.0		
Total rejected ballots		712			
Turnout		41,102	56.9		
Eligible voters		72,256			
Bloc Québécois hold		Swing		+11.37	
Source: Elections Canada

2015 Canadian federal election: Manicouagan
Party	Candidate	Votes	%	±%	Expenditures
Bloc Québécois	Marilène Gill	17,338	41.25	+8.57	$19,611.43
Liberal	Mario Tremblay	12,343	29.37	+23.86	$9,363.37
New Democratic	Jonathan Genest-Jourdain	7,359	17.51	-30.17	$24,554.75
Conservative	Yvon Boudreau	4,317	10.27	-1.36	$16,863.38
Green	Nathan Grills	673	1.60	-0.91	–
Total valid votes/Expense limit		42,030	100.00		$259,798.61
Total rejected ballots		645	1.51	–	
Turnout		75,030	56.88	–	
Eligible voters		75,030			
Bloc Québécois gain from New Democratic		Swing		+19.37	
Source: Elections Canada

2011 federal election redistributed results
Party	Vote	%
New Democratic	18,458	47.67
Bloc Québécois	12,654	32.68
Conservative	4,502	11.63
Liberal	2,131	5.50
Green	972	2.51

2011 Canadian federal election
Party	Candidate	Votes	%	±%	Expenditures
New Democratic	Jonathan Genest-Jourdain	16,437	48.93	+44.1	
Bloc Québécois	Gérard Asselin	10,495	31.24	-18.1	
Conservative	Gordon Ferguson	3,878	11.55	-15.5	
Liberal	André Forbes (Note: André Forbes was nominated as a Liberal, but lost party support just before the nomination deadline. Instead of resigning, he continued to run as an independent. He appears on the ballot as a Liberal.)	1,882	5.60	-9.7	
Green	Jacques Gélineau	898	2.67	-0.9	
Total valid votes/Expense limit		33,590	100.00		
Total rejected ballots		524	1.54	+0.1	
Turnout		34,114	52.10	–	
Eligible voters		65,481	–	–	
New Democratic gain from Bloc Québécois		Swing		+31.1	

2008 Canadian federal election
Party	Candidate	Votes	%	±%	Expenditures
Bloc Québécois	Gérard Asselin	15,272	49.3	-1.8	$60,396
Conservative	Pierre Breton	8,374	27.0	+8.0	$57,909
Liberal	Randy Jones	4,737	15.3	+1.0	$3,407
New Democratic	Michaël Chicoine	1,491	4.8	-8.0	$228
Green	Jacques Gélineau	1,112	3.6	+1.3	
Total valid votes/Expense limit		30,986	100.0	$99,164	
Total rejected ballots		444	1.4		
Turnout		31,430	–		

2006 Canadian federal election
Party	Candidate	Votes	%	±%	Expenditures
Bloc Québécois	Gérard Asselin	18,601	51.1	-7.4	$59,792
Conservative	Pierre Paradis	6,910	19.0	+14.1	$9,560
Liberal	Randy Jones	5,214	14.3	-10.6	$22,979
New Democratic	Pierre Ducasse	4,657	12.8	+2.5	$20,006
Green	Jacques Gélineau	824	2.3	+0.9	
Independent	Eric Viver	195	0.5	–	
Total valid votes/Expense limit		36,401	100.0	$92,367	

2004 Canadian federal election
Party	Candidate	Votes	%	±%	Expenditures
Bloc Québécois	Gérard Asselin	19,040	58.5	+5.3	$55,212
Liberal	Anthony Detroio	8,097	24.9	-10.8	$54,120
New Democratic	Pierre Ducasse	3,361	10.3	+8.6	$23,174
Conservative	Pierre Paradis	1,601	4.9	-4.4 (Note: Conservative vote is compared to the total of the Canadian Alliance vote and Progressive Conservative vote in 2000 election.)	$4,449
Green	Les Parsons	444	1.4	–	$905
Total valid votes/Expense limit		32,543	100.0	$90,297	

2000 Canadian federal election
Party	Candidate	Votes	%	±%
Bloc Québécois	Ghislain Fournier	11,595	53.2	+6.2
Liberal	Robert Labadie	7,770	35.7	-5.5
Alliance	Laurette De Champlain	1,197	5.5	n/a
Progressive Conservative	Gaby-Gabriel Robert	830	3.8	-3.9
New Democratic	Normand Caplette	386	1.8	-2.2
Total valid votes		21,778	100.0	

1997 Canadian federal election
Party	Candidate	Votes	%	±%
Bloc Québécois	Ghislain Fournier	12,203	47.1	-7.9
Liberal	André Maltais	10,671	41.2	+20.1
Progressive Conservative	Michel Allard	2,009	7.7	-14.5
New Democratic	Pierre Ducasse	1,041	4.0	+2.3
Total valid votes		25,924	100.0	

1993 Canadian federal election
Party	Candidate	Votes	%	±%
Bloc Québécois	Bernard St-Laurent	14,859	55.0	n/a (Note: No BQ candidate in 1988 for comparison.)
Progressive Conservative	Charles Langlois	6,024	22.3	-39.4
Liberal	Rita Lavoie	5,694	21.1	-1.8
New Democratic	Eric Hébert	451	1.7	-12.8
Total valid votes		27,028	100.0	

1988 Canadian federal election
Party	Candidate	Votes	%	±%
Progressive Conservative	Charles Langlois	17,126	61.7	-9.9
Liberal	Sylvain Garneau	6,355	22.9	-1.6
New Democratic	Carol Guay	4,008	14.4	+12.1
Commonwealth of Canada	Alan John York	281	1.0	+0.8
Total valid votes		27,770	100.0	

1984 Canadian federal election
Party	Candidate	Votes	%	±%
Progressive Conservative	Brian Mulroney	28,208	71.6	+56.1
Liberal	André Maltais	9,640	24.5	-44.2
New Democratic	Denis Faubert	939	2.4	-4.4
Parti nationaliste	Laurian Dupont	536	1.4	
Commonwealth of Canada	Raynald Rouleau	101	0.3	
Total valid votes		39,424	100.0	

1980 Canadian federal election
Party	Candidate	Votes	%	±%
Liberal	André Maltais	21,499	68.6	10.0
Progressive Conservative	Jacques Blouin	4,844	15.5	-0.2
New Democratic	Roger Muller	2,111	6.7	+0.1
Social Credit	Marcel Brin	1,184	3.8	-13.2
Rhinoceros	Yves Truchon	841	2.7	
Rhinoceros	Denis Tarzan Bédard	715	2.3	
Marxist–Leninist	Lisette Paradis	125	0.4	
Total valid votes		31,319	100.0	

1979 Canadian federal election
Party	Candidate	Votes	%	±%
Liberal	André Maltais	18,528	58.6	-8.6
Social Credit	Paul-Henri Tremblay	5,378	17.0	
Progressive Conservative	Denyse Patry	4,948	15.6	-1.0
New Democratic	Carole Noel	2,105	6.7	-6.8
Union populaire	Gilles Verrier	659	2.1	
Total valid votes		31,618	100.0	

1974 Canadian federal election
Party	Candidate	Votes	%	±%
Liberal	Gustave Blouin	16,220	67.2	+10.7
Progressive Conservative	Alban Malenfant	4,024	16.7	+1.1
New Democratic	Raymond Perron	3,247	13.4	+6.2
Marxist–Leninist	Gilles Verrier	659	2.7	
Total valid votes		24,150	100.0	

1972 Canadian federal election
Party	Candidate	Votes	%	±%
Liberal	Gustave Blouin	16,780	56.5	-4.1
Social Credit	Lionel-Joseph Desjardins	6,136	20.7	+12.8
Progressive Conservative	Jerry Giles	4,625	15.6	-4.8
New Democratic	Jean-Maurice Pinel	2,156	7.3	-3.8
Total valid votes		29,697	100.0	

1968 Canadian federal election
Party	Candidate	Votes	%
Liberal	Gustave Blouin	13,504	60.6
Progressive Conservative	Jerry Giles	4,539	20.4
New Democratic	Louis Rioux	2,463	11.1
Ralliement créditiste	Roger Boulanger	1,761	7.9
Total valid votes		22,267	100.0

== See also ==
- List of Canadian electoral districts
- Historical federal electoral districts of Canada

== Notes ==
Parliament of Canada
Preceded by Mount Royal	Constituency represented by the prime minister 1984–1988	Succeeded by Charlevoix
