= Casgrain =

Casgrain is a French Canadian surname. Notable people with the surname include:

- Charles Eusèbe Casgrain (1825–1907), Ontario physician and political figure
- Charles-Eusèbe Casgrain (1800–1848), lawyer and political figure in Lower Canada
- Henri-Raymond Casgrain (1831–1904), French Canadian Roman Catholic priest, author, and publisher
- Joseph Philippe Baby Casgrain (1856–1939), Quebec surveyor, civil engineer and political figure
- Léon Casgrain (1892–1967), Canadian politician
- Philippe Baby Casgrain (1826–1917), Quebec lawyer, author and political figure
- Pierre-François Casgrain (1886–1950), Canadian politician and Speaker of the Canadian House of Commons
- Thérèse Casgrain (1896–1981), feminist, reformer, politician and senator

== See also ==
- Marie-Claire Kirkland-Casgrain, first woman elected to the Legislative Assembly of Québec
- Thomas Chase-Casgrain, French Canadian lawyer
