= Parti marxiste–léniniste du Québec candidates in the 2007 Quebec provincial election =

The Parti marxiste-léniniste du Québec fielded twenty-four candidates in the 2007 provincial election, none of whom were elected. Information about these candidates may be found on this page.

== Candidates ==
=== Jean-Lesage: Jean Bédard ===
Jean Bédard is a laundry employee and union advisor. He is a perennial candidate for the Marxist-Leninist Party, having run under its banner in seven federal and six provincial elections. He appears to have been a low-profile candidate; during the 2003 election, the newspaper Le Soleil indicated that it was unable to obtain an interview with him.

Electoral record
Election	Division	Party	Votes	%	Place	Winner
1979 federal	Montmorency	Marxist-Leninist	326	0.77	5/6	Louis Duclos, Liberal
1980 federal	Montmorency	Marxist-Leninist	142	0.35	8/8	Louis Duclos, Liberal
1981 provincial	Montmorency	Marxist-Leninist	140	0.40	4/4	Clément Richard, Parti Québécois
1988 federal	Montmorency—Orléans	N/A (Marxist-Leninist)	670	1.33	4/4	Charles DeBlois, Progressive Conservative
1989 provincial	Montmorency	Marxist-Leninist	266	0.77	5/5	Yves Séguin, Liberal
1994 provincial	Montmorency	Marxist-Leninist	150	0.37	8/8	Jean Filion, Parti Québécois
1997 federal	Beauport—Montmorency—Orléans	Marxist-Leninist	419	0.82	6/6	Michel Guimond, Bloc Québécois
1998 provincial	Montmorency	Marxist-Leninist	204	0.46	6/6	Jean-François Simard, Parti Québécois
2000 federal	Beauport—Montmorency—Côte-de-Beaupré—Île-d'Orléans	Marxist-Leninist	283	0.55	7/7	Michel Guimond, Bloc Québécois
2003 provincial	Jean-Lesage	Marxist-Leninist	185	0.53	6/6	Michel Després, Liberal
2004 federal	Québec	Marxist-Leninist	223	0.46	7/7	Christiane Gagnon, Bloc Québécois
2006 federal	Beauport—Limoilou	Marxist-Leninist	234	0.48	6/6	Sylvie Boucher, Conservative
2007 provincial	Jean-Lesage	Marxist-Leninist	100	0.29	8/8	Jean-François Gosselin, Action démocratique
