= Perreault Casgrain =

Canadian politician

Perreault Casgrain O.C., c.r.
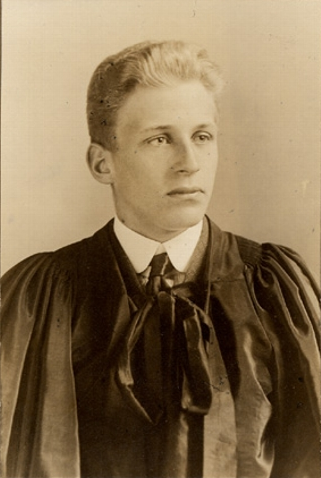
- Perreault Casgrain, c. 1920

Minister without portfolio, Government of Quebec
- In office November 5, 1942 – August 30, 1944
- Nominated by: Adélard Godbout, Premier of Quebec

Member of the Legislative Assembly of Quebec for Gaspé-Nord
- In office October 25, 1939 – August 8, 1944
- Preceded by: Joseph-Alphonse Pelletier
- Succeeded by: Joseph-Alphonse Pelletier

38th President of the Canadian Bar Association
- In office 1967–1968
- Preceded by: J.T. Weir, Q.C.
- Succeeded by: A. Gordon Cooper, Q.C.

Personal details
- Born: January 18, 1898 Quebec City, Quebec
- Died: April 26, 1981 (aged 83) Montreal, Quebec
- Party: Liberal
- Spouse: Lydie Prince
- Relations: Joseph-Alfred Mousseau, Premier of Quebec (maternal grandfather); Philippe Baby Casgrain, M.P. (paternal grandfather); Senator Charles Eusèbe Casgrain (great-uncle); Senator Joseph Philippe Baby Casgrain (uncle); Attorney General Léon Casgrain (cousin); Senator Thérèse Casgrain (distant connection by marriage)
- Children: Philippe Casgrain, Suzanne Casgrain, Q.C., Ad.E.
- Occupation: Lawyer
- Cabinet: Minister without portfolio (1942-1944)

Military service
- Branch/service: Canadian Army
- Unit: 1st Canadian Tank Battalion

Perreault Casgrain, O.C., c.r., (January 18, 1898 – April 26, 1981) was a Canadian lawyer and provincial politician in the Province of Quebec. He served one term as the national President of the Canadian Bar Association.

Casgrain was born at Quebec, the son of Charles Perreault Casgrain, a civil servant, and Germaine Mousseau. He came from a political family: his maternal grandfather, Joseph-Alfred Mousseau was the sixth Premier of Quebec, while his paternal grandfather, Philippe Baby Casgrain had been a member of the House of Commons. A great-uncle, Charles Eusèbe Casgrain and an uncle, Joseph Philippe Baby Casgrain had both been members of the Senate of Canada. Senator Thérèse Casgrain, who campaigned for women's equality and their right to vote, was a distant relative by marriage.

Casgrain was educated at a boarding school, Saint-Jean-Berchmans at Québec, at the Séminaire de Québec, at St. Procopius College (now the Benedictine University) in Chicago, Illinois, at the Collège de Sainte-Anne-de-la-Pocatière and at the Université Laval. He volunteered for the Canadian Army during World War I, as an officer in the 1st Canadian Tank Battalion.

He was called to the Bar of Quebec in 1920 and practised in Rimouski from 1920 to 1974, and in Montreal from 1974 onwards. From 1920 to 1936, he was the Crown prosecutor for the Rimouski district, being named King's Counsel ("conseillier du roi") in 1930.

He was a member of the Legislative Assembly of Quebec for Gaspé-Nord from 1939 to 1944. From 1942 to 1944, he served as Minister without portfolio in the Cabinet of Premier Adélard Godbout. He served in Cabinet at the same time as his cousin, Attorney General Léon Casgrain.

Casgrain was active in the bar of Quebec and the Canadian Bar Association throughout his career. In 1967–68, he served as national President of the Canadian Bar Association.

In 1973, he was invested into the Order of Canada, "in recognition of his contribution to the legal profession as well as to the cultural life of the region of Rimouski."

He died in Montreal in 1981 at age 83.
