= Valin v Langlois =

1879 Canadian Supreme Court case

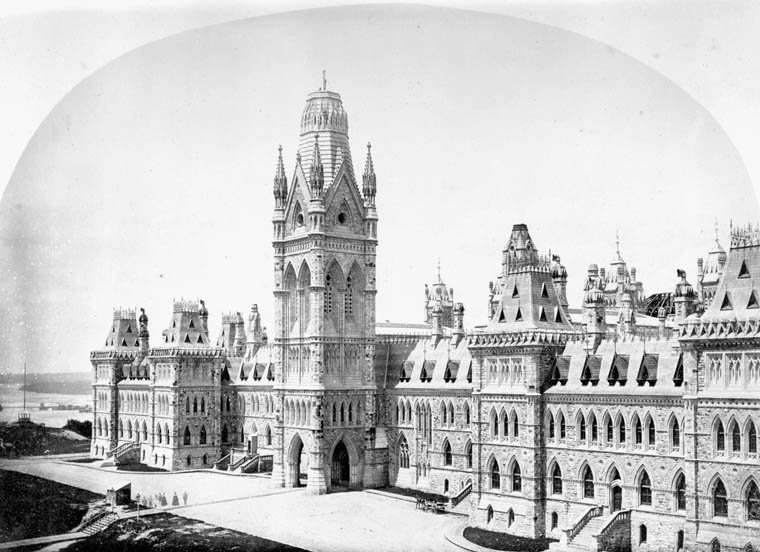
- Valin v Langlois concerned a disputed election to the Parliament of Canada in 1878
- Court: Supreme Court of Canada
- Full case name: Controverted Election of the County of Montmorency: P.V. Valin and Jean Langlois
- Decided: October 28, 1879
- Citations: (1879), 3 SCR 1

Case history
- Appealed from: Langlois v Valin (Montmorency Case) (1879), 5 QLR 1 (Que. SC)
- Appealed to: Judicial Committee of the Privy Council
- Subsequent actions: Judicial Committee dismissed application for leave to appeal; Superior Court declared seat declared vacant

Court membership
- Judges sitting: Ritchie C.J. Fournier; Henry; Taschereau; Gwynne

Keywords
- Constitutional law; federal election law; superior court jurisdiction

Valin v Langlois
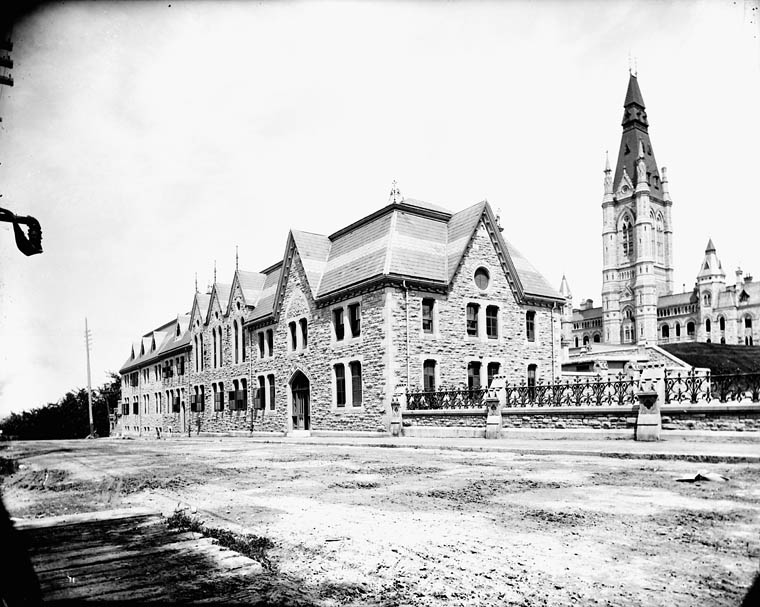
- The Judicial Committee declined leave to appeal from the Supreme Court of Canada
- Court: Judicial Committee of the Privy Council
- Full case name: Pierre Vincent Valin v Jean Langlois
- Decided: December 13, 1879
- Citation: (1879-80) 5 App. Cas. 115, [1879] UKPC 68 (PC)

Case history
- Appealed from: Valin v Langlois (1879), 3 SCR 1
- Subsequent action: Seat declared vacant by the Superior Court

Court membership
- Judges sitting: Lord Selborne; Sir James W. Colville; Sir Barnes Peacock; Sir Montague E. Smith; Sir Robert P. Collier

Case opinions
- Leave to appeal denied
- Decision by: Lord Selborne

Keywords
- Constitutional law; federal elections; jurisdiction of superior courts

Valin v Langlois is a Canadian constitutional law decision from the Supreme Court of Canada, concerning the jurisdiction of the federal Parliament over federal elections, as well as the constitutional jurisdiction of the provincial superior courts. The Court held that the Parliament of Canada has sole jurisdiction to enact laws regulating federal elections, including provisions for controverted elections. The Court also held that the provincial superior courts have general jurisdiction over questions of federal and provincial law, and that Parliament could give provincial courts jurisdiction to apply federal laws.

The case arose from a controverted federal election in 1878, in the Quebec riding of Montmorency. Pierre-Vincent Valin was declared the successful candidate, but his election was challenged by his opponent, Jean Langlois, in the Superior Court of Quebec under the Dominion Controverted Elections Act, 1874.

On appeal, the Supreme Court of Canada upheld the constitutionality of the law. Valin then tried to appeal to the Judicial Committee of the Privy Council, at that time the court of last resort for Canada within the British Empire. The Judicial Committee denied leave to appeal, leaving the Supreme Court decision as the governing statement of the law.

The Supreme Court of Canada continues to cite its decision in Valin v Langlois as the foundational case with respect to the jurisdiction of provincial superior courts, as well as with regard to Parliament's jurisdiction over federal elections. It is also cited for this purpose in texts on Canadian constitutional law.

The case is included in a collection of significant constitutional decisions from the Judicial Committee, published by the federal Department of Justice.

== Background ==
=== The Dominion Controverted Elections Act, 1874 ===
When Canada was created in 1867, the House of Commons initially relied on the pre-Confederation laws from each of the provinces to deal with controverted elections. Those laws followed the precedent of the British House of Commons: following a general election, the Speaker of the House of Commons would establish a committee of members of the Commons to hear and decide election petitions. The process was invariably partisan in approach and outcome.

In 1873, Parliament enacted a new Act that applied uniformly to federal elections in all provinces, and which repealed the pre-existing provincial laws, to the extent they applied to federal elections. The 1873 Act set up an Election Court in each province, drawing on the judges of the superior courts of the province to sit in the Election Court. Those courts would have exclusive jurisdiction to hear and decide election petitions, taking that power away from the House of Commons.

The 1873 Act only stayed in force for one year. In 1874, following the 1874 federal election, Parliament enacted a new statute, The Dominion Controverted Elections Act, 1874, and repealed the 1873 Act. Unlike the 1873 Act, the 1874 Act did not create special Election Courts. Instead, it assigned the jurisdiction to try election petitions directly to the superior courts of each province. It was the 1874 Act which was challenged in Valin v Langlois.

=== 1878 Montmorency election challenge ===
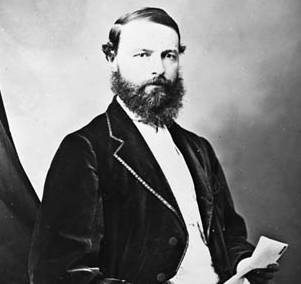
Jean Langlois, QC, the unsuccessful candidate, who challenged the election

Valin v Langlois arose from a controverted election in the riding of Montmorency, in the federal general election of 1878. The riding of Montmorency was located in the rural area outside Quebec City. Jean Langlois was the member for Montmorency from 1867 to 1878, and contested the seat again in the 1878 election. Pierre-Vincent Valin was his opponent in 1878. Valin was declared the winner, but Langlois challenged the election result in the Quebec Superior Court under the Dominion Controverted Elections Act, 1874.

Valin raised a preliminary objection, challenging the jurisdiction of the court. He argued that the federal Parliament could not give jurisdiction over federal election matters to the provincial courts. Chief Justice Meredith of the Superior Court dismissed the objection and held that the court had jurisdiction. Valin then appealed to the Supreme Court of Canada.

== Supreme Court decision ==
=== Counsel's submissions ===
On appeal, Valin was represented by Honoré-Cyrias Pelletier, QC, a lawyer who specialised in controverted elections. Pelletier argued three points: (1) that the structure of the provincial courts was a matter of exclusive provincial jurisdiction, and the federal government could not add to their jurisdiction; (2) that the federal government had not created a federal court in the 1874 legislation; (3) that the right to sit in Parliament was a political right, which could not be assigned to the civil courts.

Langlois was a lawyer and appeared on his own behalf. He responded that Parliament can confer jurisdiction on the provincial courts, provided Parliament stays within its legislative authority, such as federal elections. He also argued that Parliament had in fact created a federal court, and that it was immaterial whether the right be characterised as a political right or a civil right.

=== Reasons of the Court ===
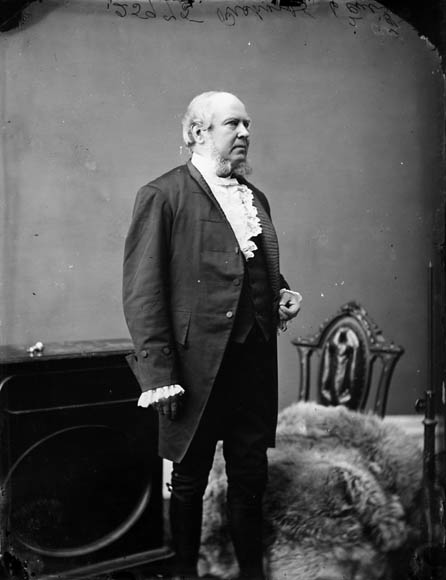
Chief Justice Ritchie, who wrote the longest decision upholding the Act

The five judges who decided the case unanimously upheld the validity of The Controverted Elections Act, 1874. (All six judges of the Court initially heard the appeal, but Justice Strong did not participate in the decision due to illness.)

The five judges who decided the case each wrote their own reasons, as was the Court's practice at that time. The longest set of reasons was given by Chief Justice Ritchie, who outlined the history of election challenges. He also cited the power of the federal Parliament to govern its own election processes under s. 41 of the Constitution Act, 1867, before turning to the issue of court jurisdiction. He concluded that when Parliament conferred jurisdiction over a federal law on the provincial courts, it was in no way interfering with the powers of the provincial legislatures to govern matters within their authority. He also held that the provincial superior courts are courts of general jurisdiction, capable of exercising authority granted by federal laws as well as provincial laws:

These courts are surely bound to execute all laws in force in the Dominion, whether they are enacted by the Parliament of the Dominion or by the Local Legislatures, respectively. They are not mere local courts for the administration of the local laws passed by the Local Legislatures of the Provinces in which they are organized. ... They are the Queen's Courts, bound to take cognizance of and execute all laws whether enacted by the Dominion Parliament or the Local Legislatures, provided always, such laws are within the scope of their respective legislative powers.

He concluded that whether the federal statute conferred jurisdiction on provincial courts, or constituted the provincial courts to be federal courts for a specific purpose, was immaterial. In either event, the law was within federal jurisdiction.

Justice Fournier wrote reasons in French, which were also published in English. He wrote that he concurred with the reasons of the Chief Justice. His main point to add was that if Parliament could not confer jurisdiction on the provincial courts to implement federal laws, such as election laws passed under the authority of s. 41 of the Constitution Act, 1867 then there was a significant gap in the constitutional powers of the Parliament. It would lack a way to ensure the execution of federal laws. He concluded that Parliament had the authority to confer jurisdiction over federal law on the provincial courts.

Justice Henry approached the matter from the scope of the federal Parliament's power to legislate. He acknowledged that Parliament had sole power to legislate with respect to federal election matters. Parliament therefore had the power to assign the election jurisdiction to the provincial courts, just as it did with other matters of federal law, such as the criminal law. He did not see any difference between matters of political character, such as elections, and other types of federal laws. Assigning jurisdiction did not in any way infringe on the powers of the provincial legislatures, since they had no jurisdiction over federal elections.

Justice Taschereau held that there was no doubt that Parliament could legislate in the area of federal elections, and therefore could assign jurisdiction over that topic to the provincial courts, just as with other matters of federal jurisdiction, such as the criminal law and bankruptcy.

Justice Gwynne focussed on the argument that the issue of election challenges was a political right, rather than a civil right, which could not be assigned to the courts. He rejected that argument, relying on the British precedents where Parliament had transferred election challenges to the courts, as well as by concluding that the right to stand for election to Parliament was clearly a civil right. The jurisdiction therefore could be assigned to the provincial courts.

=== Procedural decision ===
In addition to the main jurisdictional issue, there was also a procedural issue raised by the Superior Court decision. Valin had filed a cross-petition, accusing Langlois and his agents of corrupt practices. Chief Justice Meredith ruled that there had been a statutory time limit for Valin to file a cross-petition against the unsuccessful candidate, and he had not done so within that time period. He therefore dismissed the cross-petition.

In a separate decision from the jurisdictional issue, the Supreme Court unanimously dismissed the appeal relating to the cross-petition. For varying reasons, the Court agreed that there was only a limited time to file a cross-petition against the unsuccessful candidation, and Valin had not met the timelimit.

== Judicial Committee decision ==
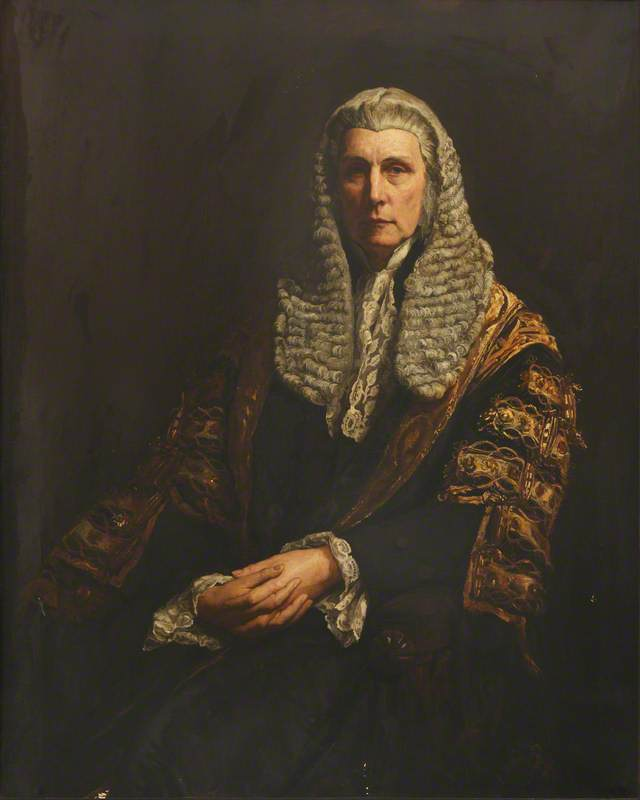
Lord Selborne, who gave the decision dismissing leave to appeal

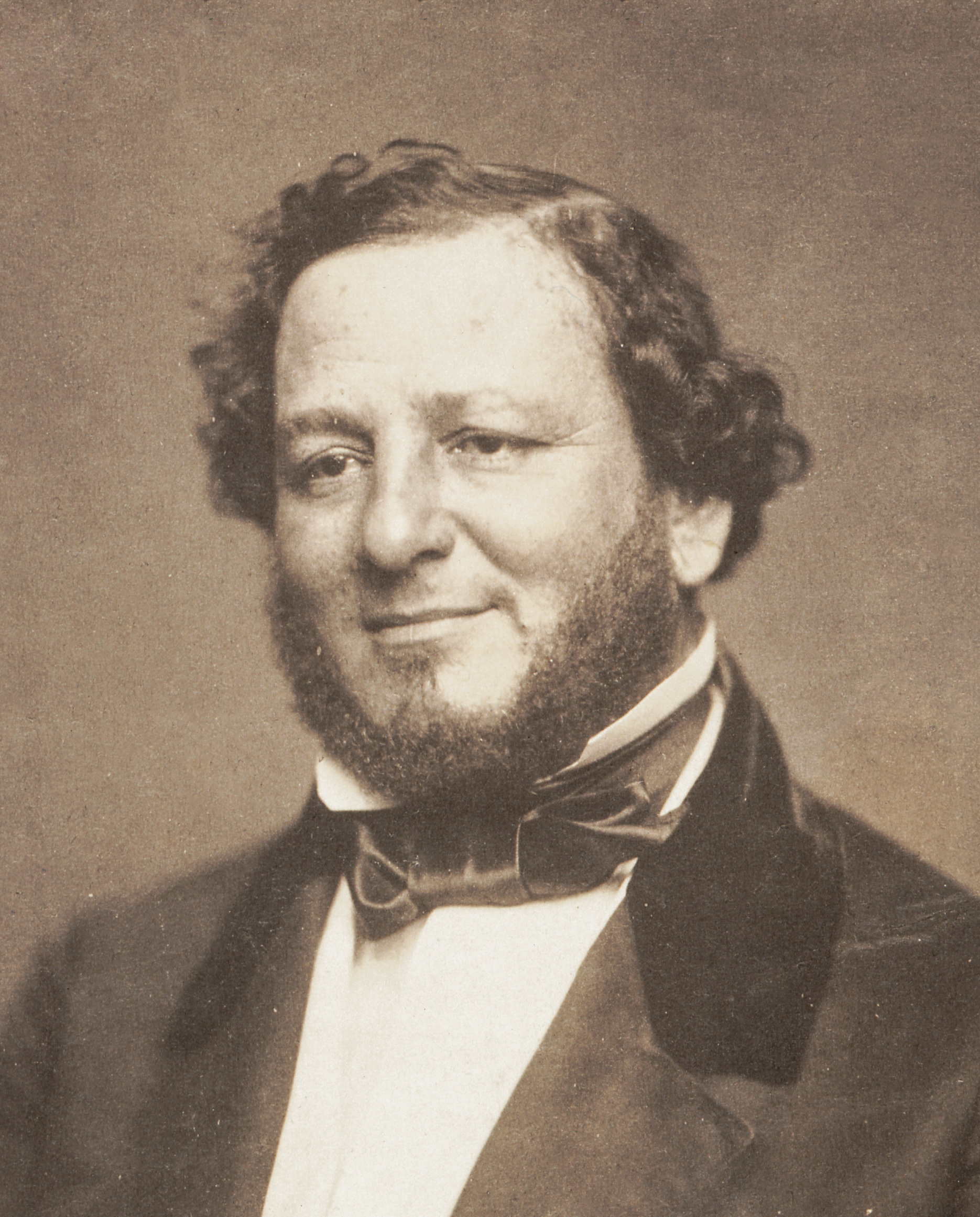
Judah Benjamin, QC, counsel for Valin on the leave application

Valin applied for leave to appeal to the Judicial Committee of the Privy Council. At that time, the Judicial Committee was the highest court for the British Empire, including Canada. It could hear appeals from the Supreme Court of Canada, provided the proposed appellant was granted leave to appeal.

Judah Benjamin, QC, and Gainsford Bruce were counsel for Valin on the application for leave. No-one appeared for Langlois. The Judicial Committee dismissed the application for leave at the conclusion of the hearing on December 13, 1879.

The Lord Chancellor, Lord Selborne, gave the decision for the Judicial Committee. He held that on a leave application there were two questions for the committee to consider. First, did the case raise an issue of sufficient importance to warrant a further appeal? Second, was there a serious and substantial question needing to be determined? He held that the first issue was clearly met. The power of the federal Parliament in relation to elections to the House of Commons was a matter of considerable public importance.

However, the Committee concluded that the application failed on the second point, as they had no doubt as to the correctness of the decision of the Supreme Court (which Lord Selborne referred to as the "Court of Appeal"). Section 41 of the Constitution Act, 1867 gave the federal Parliament the power to legislate in the area, and that power included the power to confer jurisdiction on the provincial courts to determine disputed federal elections.

As was the practice of the Judicial Committee at that time, Selborne gave the decision for the entire committee, with no reasons from any of the other judges.

== Final outcome ==
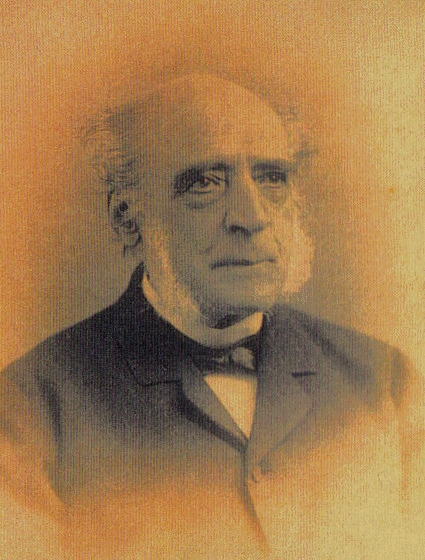
Chief Justice Meredith, who set aside Valin's election

With the jurisdictional matters decided by the Judicial Committee, the election challenge resumed in front of Chief Justice Meredith in the Superior Court of Quebec. At the hearing, Valin admitted that corrupt practices had been committed by his agents, sufficient to void the election. However, he asserted that those practices had been committed without his knowledge and without his participation or consent. On that admission, Chief Justice Meredith ruled that the election of Valin was null and void. He filed his report with the Speaker of the House of Commons, who then issued a writ for a by-election in Montmorency. Neither Valin nor Langlois stood for election in the by-election, which was won by Auguste-Réal Angers.

== Significance of the decision ==
The Supreme Court continues to cite the case as a foundational case for provincial superior court jurisdiction, particularly in constitutional cases. The case is also cited for this purpose in constitutional law texts, and in analysis of superior court jurisdiction.

Following the abolition of Canadian appeals to the Judicial Committee, the Minister of Justice and Attorney General of Canada directed the Department of Justice to prepare a compilation of all constitutional cases decided by the Judicial Committee on the construction and interpretation of the British North America Act, 1867 (now the Constitution Act, 1867), for the assistance of the Canadian Bench and Bar. This case was included in the three volume collection of constitutional decisions of the Judicial Committee.

The Supreme Court has also cited the case as precedent for federal jurisdiction over federal elections.
