= Eusèbe =

Eusèbe may refer to:

People:

- Charles Eusèbe Casgrain (1825–1907), Ontario physician and political figure
- Charles-Eusèbe Casgrain (1800–1848), lawyer and political figure in Lower Canada
- Charles-Eusèbe Dionne (1846–1925), French Canadian naturalist and taxidermist
- Eusèbe Renaudot (1646–1720), French theologian and Orientalist
- Eusèbe Jaojoby (born 1955), Salegy singer from the Sakalava area of Madagascar
- Télesphore-Eusèbe Normand, politician from Quebec, Canada

Places:

- Mours-Saint-Eusèbe, commune in the Drôme department in southeastern France
- Puy-Saint-Eusèbe, commune in the Hautes-Alpes department in southeastern France.
- Saint-Eusèbe, Haute-Savoie, village and commune in the Haute-Savoie department and Rhône-Alpes region of France
- Saint-Eusèbe, Saône-et-Loire, commune in the Saône-et-Loire département, in the French region of Bourgogne
- Saint-Eusèbe-en-Champsaur, commune in the Hautes-Alpes department in southeastern France
