= Pierre-Vincent Valin =

Canadian politician

Member of the Canadian Parliament for Montmorency
- In office 1878–1880
- Preceded by: Jean Langlois
- Succeeded by: Auguste-Réal Angers
- In office 1880–1887
- Preceded by: Auguste-Réal Angers
- Succeeded by: Charles Langelier

Member of the Legislative Assembly of Quebec for Québec-Est
- In office 1874–1875
- Preceded by: Charles Alphonse Pantaléon Pelletier
- Succeeded by: Joseph Shehyn

Personal details
- Born: June 1, 1827 Château-Richer, Lower Canada
- Died: October 2, 1897 (aged 70) Quebec City, Quebec
- Party: Conservative

Pierre-Vincent Valin (June 1, 1827 – October 2, 1897) was a businessman and political figure in Quebec, Canada. He represented Montmorency in the House of Commons of Canada as a Conservative member from 1878 to 1887. His name also appears as Pierre Valin.

He was born in Château-Richer, Lower Canada in 1827, the son of Toussaint Valin, and studied at Quebec. He began working as a shipbuilder in a shipyard on the Saint-Charles River in 1846. In 1853, he set up the shipbuilding company Pierre Valin et Compagnie with two partners; the partnership ended a year later but Valin continued to build ships. He married Marie-Angélique, the daughter of Joseph Talbot, dit Gervais in 1855.

Valin was elected to the municipal council of Quebec in 1871. He was elected to the Legislative Assembly of Quebec for Québec-Est in an 1874 by-election but was defeated in the general election that followed. His election to the House of Commons in 1878 was declared invalid two years later but he was reelected in the by-election that followed. He served as chairman of the Harbour Commission of Quebec from 1879 to 1889. In 1885, he married Marie-Virginie-Célina, the daughter of Pierre-Martial Bardy. Later in life, Valin owned ships that transported goods over the Atlantic and Pacific Oceans.

He died at Quebec City in 1897.

== Electoral record ==
1878 Canadian federal election: Montmorency
Party	Candidate	Votes
Conservative	Pierre-Vincent Valin	831
Unknown	Jean Langlois	605

1882 Canadian federal election: Montmorency
Party	Candidate	Votes
Conservative	Pierre-Vincent Valin	810
Liberal	Charles Langelier	717

1887 Canadian federal election: Montmorency
Party	Candidate	Votes
Liberal	Charles Langelier	939
Conservative	Pierre-Vincent Valin	938

== See also ==
- Valin v Langlois, Canadian constitutional law decision
