= Charlevoix—Saguenay =

Charlevoix—Saguenay may refer to:

- Charlevoix—Saguenay (federal electoral district), for House of Commons elections, 1924–1947
- Charlevoix—Saguenay (provincial electoral district), for National Assembly of Quebec elections, 1912–1944
