= Québec-Est =

Québec-Est may refer to:

- Quebec East, a former federal electoral district in the area of Quebec City
- Québec-Est (provincial electoral district), a former provincial electoral district in the area of Quebec City
