= Gabriel Hardy =

Canadian politician

Gabriel Hardy MP

Member of Parliament for Montmorency—Charlevoix
- Incumbent
- Assumed office April 28, 2025
- Preceded by: Caroline Desbiens

Personal details
- Party: Conservative

Gabriel Hardy MP is a Canadian politician from the Conservative Party of Canada. He was elected Member of Parliament for Montmorency—Charlevoix in the 2025 Canadian federal election.

He was a candidate for Québec 21 in the 2021 Quebec City municipal election. Gabriel Hardy is the owner and CEO of Gym Le Chalet and Tonic Gym & CrossFit.

== Electoral record ==
2025 Canadian federal election: Montmorency—Charlevoix
Party	Candidate	Votes	%	±%
Conservative	Gabriel Hardy	20,494	34.50	+0.62
Bloc Québécois	Caroline Desbiens	19,970	33.62	−3.08
Liberal	Alex Ouellet-Bélanger	17,101	28.79	+8.58
New Democratic	Gérard Briand	905	1.52	−3.11
Green	Élie Prud'Homme-Tessier	580	0.98	−0.22
People's	Bart Cortenbach	357	0.60	−1.28
Total valid votes		59,407	98.78	
Total rejected ballots		732	1.22	-0.49
Turnout		60,139	72.23	+5.99
Eligible voters		83,265		
Conservative notional gain from Bloc Québécois		Swing		+1.85
Source: Elections Canada
Note: number of eligible voters does not include voting day registrations.
