= Caroline Desbiens =

Canadian politician

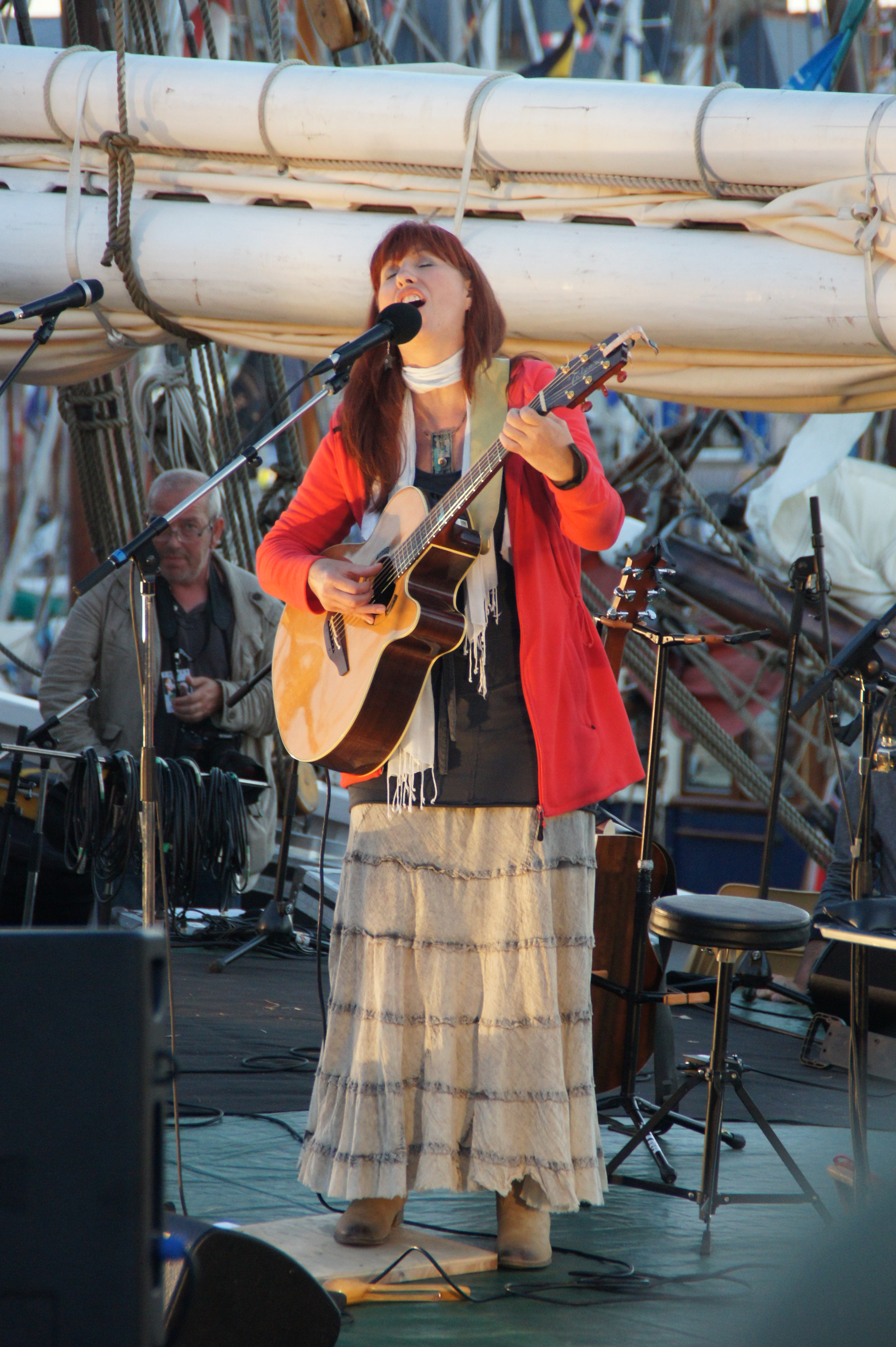
- Caroline Desbiens on stage, France, 2013

Member of Parliament for Beauport—Côte-de-Beaupré—Île d'Orléans—Charlevoix
- In office October 21, 2019 – March 23, 2025
- Preceded by: Sylvie Boucher
- Succeeded by: Gabriel Hardy

Personal details
- Born: 1962 or 1963 (age 62–63) L'Isle-aux-Coudres, Quebec, Canada
- Party: Bloc Québécois
- Children: 1

Caroline Desbiens (French pronunciation: [kaʁɔlin debjɛ̃]) is a Canadian politician and singer who served as the member of Parliament for the riding of Beauport—Côte-de-Beaupré—Île d'Orléans—Charlevoix from 2019 to 2025 as a member of the Bloc Québécois.

== Background ==
Caroline Desbiens was born in L'Isle-aux-Coudres where her parents owned and operated a hotel, the Hôtel du Capitaine, founded in 1961. She attended Université Laval where she initially enrolled in French studies, but ultimately earned a bachelor's degree in industrial relations. After completing her degree, she spent a year studying literature and communications.

== Singing career ==
Upon completing her studies, Desbiens discovered an interest in singing and songwriting. She would often perform at the family hotel where she worked. Her music focussed on themes related to the local people, heritage, and geography. In 2003, she released an album, Sortir de l'eau.

== Political career ==
Desbiens ran as the Bloc Québécois candidate for the riding of Beauport—Côte-de-Beaupré—Île d'Orléans—Charlevoix in the 2019 federal election. During the campaign, some of her past social media posts attracted public attention. In a 2013 Facebook post, she expressed support for the Parti Québécois' proposed Charter of Quebec Values, warning that women might soon be forced to wear religious veils in public. In a 2016 post, she praised far-right French politician Marine Le Pen. She later apologized for her comments.

She won the election, defeating Conservative incumbent Sylvie Boucher. She was the first marsouine – a resident of L'Isle-aux-Coudres – to serve as a member of Parliament. She was re-elected in the 2021 election. During her first term, she served as the Bloc Québécois critic for culture before being appointed critic for fisheries, oceans, and the Canadian Coast Guard in the party’s shadow cabinet for the 44th Parliament.

In the 2025 election, Desbiens was defeated by Conservative candidate Gabriel Hardy.

== Electoral record ==
2025 Canadian federal election: Montmorency—Charlevoix
Party	Candidate	Votes	%	±%
Conservative	Gabriel Hardy	20,494	34.50	+0.62
Bloc Québécois	Caroline Desbiens	19,970	33.62	−3.08
Liberal	Alex Ouellet-Bélanger	17,101	28.79	+8.58
New Democratic	Gérard Briand	905	1.52	−3.11
Green	Élie Prud'Homme-Tessier	580	0.98	−0.22
People's	Bart Cortenbach	357	0.60	−1.28
Total valid votes		59,407	98.78	
Total rejected ballots		732	1.22	-0.49
Turnout		60,139	72.23	+5.99
Eligible voters		83,265		
Conservative notional gain from Bloc Québécois		Swing		+1.85
Source: Elections Canada
Note: number of eligible voters does not include voting day registrations.

2021 Canadian federal election: Beauport—Côte-de-Beaupré—Île d'Orléans—Charlevoix
Party	Candidate	Votes	%	±%	Expenditures
Bloc Québécois	Caroline Desbiens	19,270	38.44	+2.09	$27,050.37
Conservative	Véronique Laprise	15,969	31.85	+2.14	$25,427.63
Liberal	Alexandra Bernier	10,365	20.67	–0.28	$7,031.80
New Democratic	Frédéric du Verle	2,242	4.47	–1.14	$320.79
People's	Jennifer Lefrançois	881	1.76	–0.30	$0.00
Green	Frédéric Amyot	733	1.46	–1.22	$0.00
Free	Chantal Laplante	449	0.90	–	$409.94
Independent	Vicky Lépine	227	0.45	–	$0.00
Total valid votes/expense limit		50,136	100.00	–	$115,228.60
Total rejected ballots		902	1.77	–0.12	
Turnout		51,038	65.64	–1.69	
Registered voters		77,752			
Bloc Québécois hold		Swing		–0.03	
Source: Elections Canada

2019 Canadian federal election: Beauport—Côte-de-Beaupré—Île d'Orléans—Charlevoix
Party	Candidate	Votes	%	±%	Expenditures
Bloc Québécois	Caroline Desbiens	18,407	36.35	+17.21	$10,197.29
Conservative	Sylvie Boucher	15,044	29.71	-3.82	none listed
Liberal	Manon Fortin	10,608	20.95	-5.94	none listed
New Democratic	Gérard Briand	2,841	5.61	-12.85	none listed
Green	Richard Guertin	1,355	2.68	+0.98	$5,913.35
No affiliation	Raymond Bernier	1,335	2.64	–	$5,886.96
People's	Jean-Claude Parent	1,045	2.06	–	none listed
Total valid votes/expense limit		50,635	98.11		
Total rejected ballots		976	1.89		
Turnout		51,611	67.33		
Eligible voters		76,657			
Bloc Québécois gain from Conservative		Swing		+10.52	
Source: Elections Canada
