= Jacques-Philippe Rhéaume =

Canadian politician

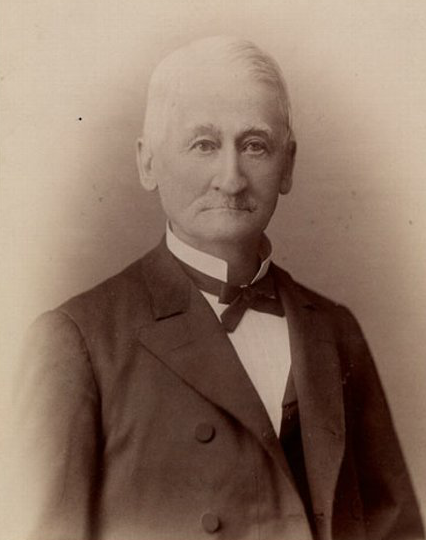

Member of the Legislative Assembly of Quebec for Québec-Est
- In office 1867–1873
- Succeeded by: Charles Alphonse Pantaléon Pelletier

Personal details
- Born: May 1, 1818 Quebec City, Lower Canada
- Died: April 26, 1891 (aged 72) Quebec City, Quebec
- Party: Conservative

Jacques-Philippe Rhéaume (May 1, 1818 – April 26, 1891) was a lawyer and political figure in Quebec. He represented Québec-Est in the Legislative Assembly of Quebec from 1867 to 1873 as a Conservative.

He was born in Notre-Dame de Québec, Lower Canada, the son of Jacques Rhéaume and Charlotte Jacques, was educated at the Séminaire de Québec and was admitted to the Lower Canada bar in 1840. In 1844, he married Euphémie Gagnon. He was a founder of the Saint-Jean-Baptiste Society at Quebec City. Rhéaume served as a member of the municipal council for Quebec City from 1847 to 1861. He resigned his seat in the Quebec assembly in 1873 after he was named an agent for the Seigneurial Commission. Rhéaume was an unsuccessful candidate for a seat in the House of Commons in 1882, losing to Sir Wilfrid Laurier. He died at Quebec City at the age of 72.
