= Jonathan Tremblay =

Canadian politician

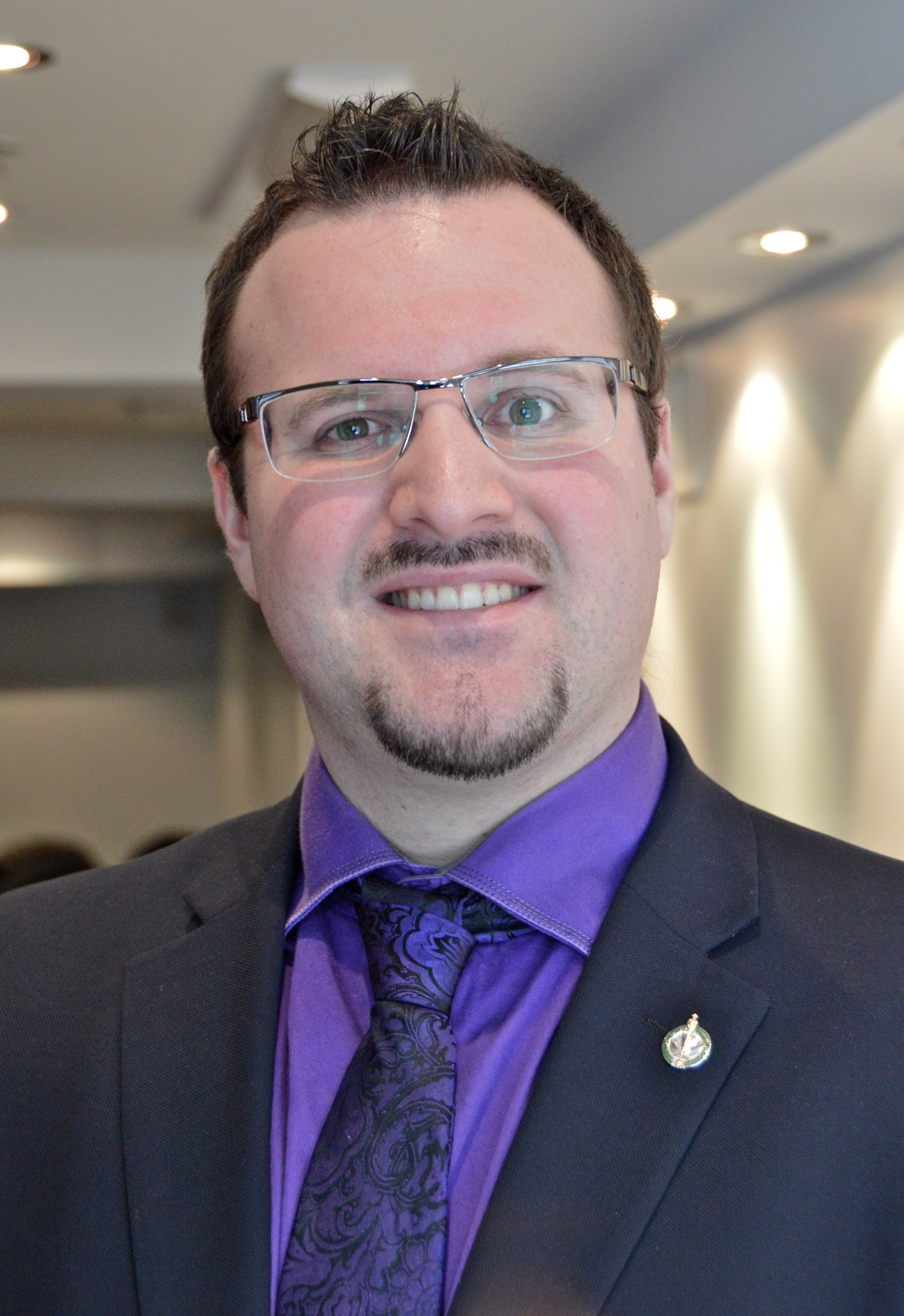

Member of Parliament for Montmorency—Charlevoix—Haute-Côte-Nord
- In office May 2, 2011 – August 4, 2015
- Preceded by: Michel Guimond
- Succeeded by: Sylvie Boucher

Personal details
- Born: November 15, 1984 (age 41) Beaupré, Quebec, Canada
- Party: New Democratic Party
- Spouse: Rebecca Deroy (2013-present)
- Profession: Bricklayer, masonry.

Jonathan Tremblay (born November 15, 1984) is a Canadian politician, who was elected to the House of Commons of Canada in the 2011 election. He represented the electoral district of Montmorency—Charlevoix—Haute-Côte-Nord as a member of the New Democratic Party. Tremblay was defeated when he ran for re-election in 2015.

Shortly after his defeat, Tremblay announced he would seek a city council seat in Beaupré in a by-election.

Prior to being elected, Tremblay was a bricklayer and mason. He has three children.
