= Ligue des droits et libertés =

Canadian not-for-profit human rights organization

The Ligue des droits et libertés (formerly known in English as the Quebec Civil Liberties Union) is a not-for-profit human rights organization based in Montreal in the Canadian province of Quebec. Under the Duplessis regime, some of the founders of the League were already very active in the defense of human rights in Canada. This is particularly the case of Frank Scott, who founded the Canadian Society for Human Rights in 1937, Thérèse Casgrain, pioneer in the fight for women's suffrage and founder of the League for Women's Rights, Pierre Elliot Trudeau, who participated in the creation of several groups intended to federate the opposition forces to the duplessist regime in the second half of the 1950s.

J.Z. Léon Patenaude, Jacques Hébert, and Gérard Pelletier joined them to launch the Ligue des droits de l'homme on May 29, 1963, in Montreal. The organization is committed to upholding the principles of the Universal Declaration of Human Rights.

== History and policies ==
Pierre Trudeau, one of the co-founders of the union, served as prime minister of Canada from 1968 to 1979 and from 1980 to 1984. Jacques Hébert served as president of the union for part of this period and opposed Trudeau's use of the War Measures Act to resolve the FLQ Crisis.

The organization opposes Canada's policy of detaining people under security certificates.
