= Anne Blouin =

Canadian politician

Member of the Canadian Parliament for Montmorency—Orléans
- In office 1984–1988
- Preceded by: Louis Duclos
- Succeeded by: Charles Deblois

Personal details
- Born: 14 September 1946 (age 79) Sainte-Anne-de-Beaupré, Quebec
- Party: Progressive Conservative

Anne Blouin (born 14 September 1946) was a Progressive Conservative party member of the House of Commons of Canada. She was an executive assistant by career.

Blouin was elected at the Montmorency—Orléans electoral district in the 1984 federal election. She left federal politics after her only term in office, the 33rd Canadian Parliament.
