= Joseph Shehyn =

Canadian businessman and politician

The Hon. Joseph Shehyn
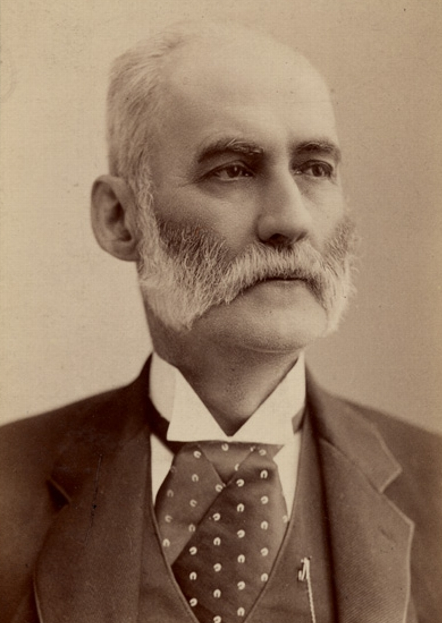

Member of the Legislative Assembly of Quebec for Québec-Est
- In office 1875–1900
- Preceded by: Pierre-Vincent Valin
- Succeeded by: Jules-Alfred Lane

Senator for The Laurentides, Quebec
- In office February 5, 1900 – July 14, 1918
- Appointed by: Wilfrid Laurier
- Preceded by: Evans John Price
- Succeeded by: Pierre Édouard Blondin

Personal details
- Born: November 9, 1829 Quebec City, Quebec
- Died: July 14, 1918 (aged 88) Quebec City, Quebec
- Party: Quebec Liberal Party
- Other political affiliations: Liberal Party of Canada
- Relations: Napoléon Belcourt, son-in-law
- Cabinet: Provincial: Minister Without Portfolio (1897-1900); Provincial Treasurer (1887-1891)

Joseph Shehyn (November 9, 1829 – July 14, 1918) was a Canadian businessman and politician.

Born in Quebec City, Quebec, the son of Edmond Sheehy and Marie (Flavie) Parent, Shehyn was raised by his maternal uncle after the death of his mother. He started working when he was 15 in a dry goods wholesalers. He later worked for the firm McCall, Shehyn and Company and would become the sole owner in 1891.

He was elected as the Liberal candidate to the Legislative Assembly of Quebec for the electoral district of Québec-Est in the 1875 election defeating Pierre-Vincent Valin. He was re-elected by acclamation in 1878 and in the 1881, 1886, 1890, 1892, and 1897 elections. He was Provincial Treasurer from 1887 to 1891 in the cabinet of Honoré Mercier. He was a Minister Without Portfolio from 1897 to 1900 in the cabinet of Félix-Gabriel Marchand. He was summoned to the Senate of Canada for the senatorial division of The Laurentides on the advice of Prime Minister Wilfrid Laurier in 1900. A Liberal, he served until his death in 1918.

In 1891 he was appointed an officer of the Order of Leopold and was created a Knight Commander of the Order of St. Gregory the Great. He was President of the Quebec Board of Trade from 1877 to 1879 and again from 1883 to 1887. He was a member of the Quebec Harbour Commission in the late 1870s. His son-in-law was Napoléon Belcourt, a Senator and M.P.
