= Pierre-Martial Bardy =

Canadian politician (1797–1869)

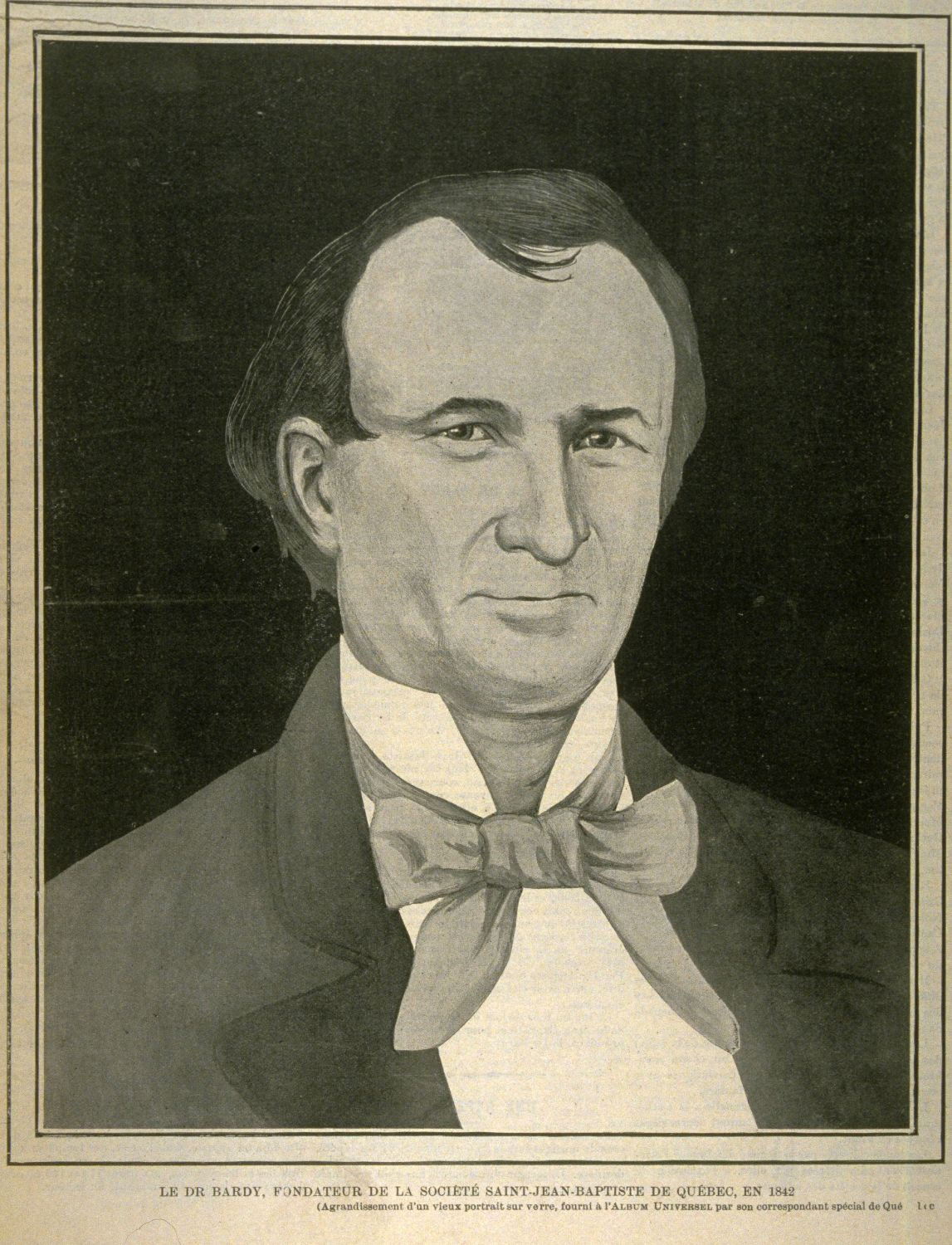
Dr Bardy

Pierre-Martial Bardy (November 30, 1797 – November 7, 1869) was a teacher, medical doctor and political figure in Lower Canada.

He was born in the town of Quebec in 1797, the son of a wig maker of Italian ancestry, and studied at the Petit Séminaire de Québec. He was admitted to holy orders, studied theology at the Grand Séminaire de Québec and taught at the Petit Séminaire. He renounced his original vocation in 1821 and married Marie-Marguerite-Louise, the daughter of merchant Louis-Henri Archambault, the following year. He continued to teach for a few years and later served as school inspector from 1842 to 1868.

Bardy studied medicine with William Robertson at Montreal and qualified to practice in 1829. He set up practice at Saint-Jacques, eventually settling at Quebec. He helped found the École de Médecine de Québec and also taught there and served as its secretary from 1848 to 1854. In 1834, he was elected to the Legislative Assembly of Lower Canada for Rouville, supporting the parti patriote. In 1840, he married Marie-Soulange, the daughter of François-Xavier Lefebvre; their daughter Marie-Virginie-Célina later married businessman Pierre-Vincent Valin.

In 1842, Bardy helped found the Société Saint-Jean-Baptiste of Quebec and became its first president; he served as president again from 1859 to 1861. In 1849, he was part of a group promoting annexation with the United States. Around 1854, Bardy began to support the practice of homeopathy, which was not viewed favourably by other members of the medical profession.

He died at Quebec in 1869.
