= Charles Eusèbe Casgrain =

The Honourable Charles Eusèbe Casgrain
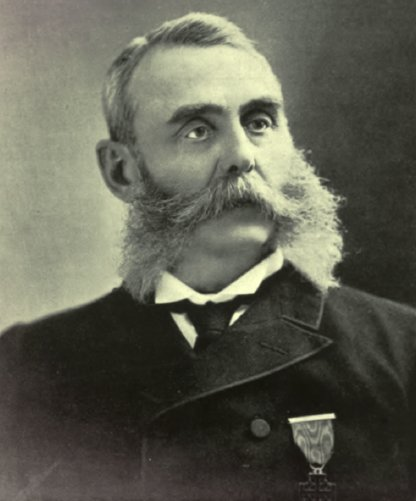

Canadian Senator from Ontario
- In office 1887–1907
- Appointed by: John A. Macdonald

Personal details
- Born: August 3, 1825 Quebec City, Lower Canada
- Died: March 8, 1907 (aged 81)
- Party: Conservative
- Relations: Charles-Eusèbe Casgrain (father); Philippe Baby Casgrain (brother); Henri-Raymond Casgrain, (brother)
- Children: Thomas Chase-Casgrain

Charles Eusèbe Casgrain (born Charles-Eugène Casgrain; August 3, 1825 – March 8, 1907) was a Canadian physician and politician who was a Conservative member of the Senate of Canada for Windsor division from 1887 to 1907. He was the first French-speaking senator from Ontario.

== Biography ==
Casgrain was born in Quebec City, Lower Canada in 1825, the son of Charles-Eusèbe Casgrain. His brother Philippe-Baby served as a member of the Canadian House of Commons and his brother Henri-Raymond was a Quebec priest and historian.

He studied at the College of St. Anne's and McGill College, graduating as an MD. He entered practice at Detroit in 1851 and married Charlotte Mary Chase in the same year, but moved to Sandwich (later Windsor) in 1856. He was also appointed coroner for Essex County. Casgrain was surgeon for the local militia during the Fenian raids. He served as a member of the town council for Windsor and as a long-time member of the local school board. He was named a knight of the Order of the Holy Sepulchre by Pope Leo XIII in 1884. Casgrain was also president of the Saint-Jean-Baptiste Society of Essex.

Casgrain was named to the Senate in 1887 and died in office in 1907, becoming the first French-speaking senator from Ontario.

His son Thomas became a lawyer and later served in the House of Commons.

== Bibliography ==
- Charles Eusèbe Casgrain – Parliament of Canada biography
- Adam, G. Mercer, ed. (1892). Prominent Men of Canada. Toronto: Canadian Biographical Publishing Co. pp. 60–62.
- Rose, Geo. Maclean, ed. (1886). A Cyclopæedia of Canadian Biography: Being Chiefly Men of the Time. Toronto: Rose Publishing Co. p. 522.
