= Charles Deblois =

Canadian politician (1939–2019)

Member of Parliament for Beauport—Montmorency—Orléans (Montmorency—Orléans; 1988–1990)
- In office 21 November 1988 – 25 October 1993
- Preceded by: Anne Blouin
- Succeeded by: Michel Guimond

Personal details
- Born: 27 May 1939 Quebec City, Quebec, Canada
- Died: 18 February 2019 (aged 79) Quebec City, Quebec, Canada
- Party: Progressive Conservative
- Spouse: Marie Bernier (m. 1989)
- Profession: Journalist

Charles Deblois (27 May 1939 – 18 February 2019) was a Canadian politician who was a member of the House of Commons from 1988 to 1993.

== Early life ==
Deblois attended school at the Seminaire du Québec, then at Université Laval. He became a journalist, working with Radio-Canada and TVA from 1970 until 1988 when he entered federal politics.

He was elected in the 1988 federal election at the Montmorency—Orléans electoral district for the Progressive Conservative party. He served in the 34th Canadian Parliament after which he was defeated by Bloc Québécois candidate Michel Guimond in the 1993 federal election when the riding was renamed to Beauport—Montmorency—Orléans. He died in 2019 at the age of 79.

== Electoral record ==
1988 Canadian federal election: Montmorency—Orléans
Party	Candidate	Votes	%	±%
Progressive Conservative	Charles DeBlois	30,578	60.52	
Liberal	Robert Paquet	11,578	22.91	
New Democratic	Éric Gourdeau	7,700	15.24	
Marxist–Leninist	Jean Bédard	670	1.33	
Total valid votes		50,526	100.00	
Total rejected ballots		906		
Turnout		51,432	74.25	
Electors on the lists		69,268		
