= Arthur Joseph Turcotte =

Canadian politician (1850–1918)

Arthur Joseph Turcotte (May 14, 1850 – November 1, 1918) was a Canadian liquor merchant and political figure in Quebec. He represented Montmorency in the House of Commons of Canada from 1892 to 1896 as a Conservative member.

He was born at Saint-Jean, Île d'Orléans, Canada East, the son of Hubert Turcotte and Virginie Blagdon. He entered business as a retailer of wines and spirits in partnership with a Mr. Prévost, later becoming a wine wholesaler on his own. Turcotte went on to serve as head of the post office at Quebec City. In 1871, he married Olivia, the daughter of Rémi-Ferdinand Rinfret. Turcotte was defeated by Joseph Israël Tarte in the 1891 federal election but won an 1892 by-election held after the results of that election were appealed. He died in Quebec City at the age of 68.
