= Charles-Eusèbe Casgrain =

Lower Canada lawyer and politician

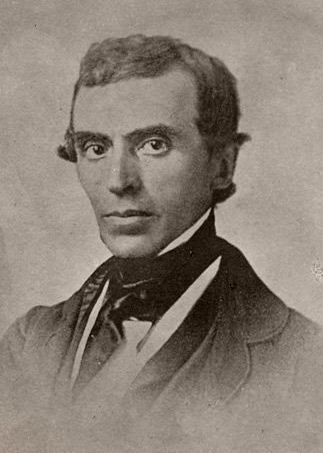

Member of the Legislative Assembly of Lower Canada
- In office 1830–1834

Personal details
- Born: December 28, 1800 Rivière-Ouelle, Lower Canada
- Died: February 29, 1848 (aged 47) Montreal, Canada East
- Relations: James Baby, father-in-law Charles Alphonse Pantaléon Pelletier, son-in-law Thomas Chase-Casgrain, grandson
- Children: Charles Eusèbe Casgrain; Philippe Baby Casgrain; Henri-Raymond Casgrain

Charles-Eusèbe Casgrain (December 28, 1800 – February 29, 1848) was a lawyer and political figure in Lower Canada.

He was born at Rivière-Ouelle in Lower Canada in 1800, the son of merchant Pierre Casgrain, and studied at the Petit Séminaire de Montréal, Petit Séminaire de Québec and the Séminaire de Nicolet. He articled in law with Louis Moquin at Quebec City and was called to the bar in 1824. In the same year, he married Eliza Anne, the daughter of James Baby who was a judge and political figure in Upper Canada. Casgrain first set up practice at Quebec and then moved back to Rivière-Ouelle in 1827. He was elected to the Legislative Assembly of Lower Canada for Kamouraska in 1830; he did not support the Ninety-Two Resolutions. Casgrain served on the Special Council which administered the province after the Lower Canada Rebellion. In 1846, he was named deputy commissioner of public works at Montreal.

He died at Montreal in 1848 and was buried at Rivière-Ouelle.

His son Charles-Eugène later became a member of the Canadian Senate and his son Philippe-Baby was a member of the House of Commons. His son Henri-Raymond became a priest and historian. His daughter Suzanne married Charles Alphonse Pantaléon Pelletier who went on to serve in the Senate of Canada and to become Lieutenant-Governor of Quebec. His grandson Thomas Chase-Casgrain served in the Canadian House of Commons.
