= Auguste-Réal Angers =

Canadian politician and Lieutenant Governor of Quebec (1837–1919)

The Honourable Sir Auguste-Réal Angers PC
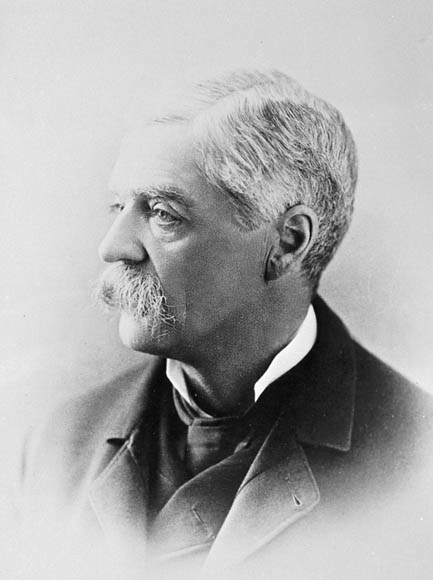

Senator for De la Vallière, Quebec
- In office 16 December 1892 – 10 June 1896
- Nominated by: John Sparrow David Thompson
- Preceded by: Anselme-Homère Pâquet
- Succeeded by: Alfred Thibaudeau

6th Lieutenant Governor of Quebec
- In office 29 October 1887 – 4 December 1892
- Monarch: Victoria
- Governors General: The Marquess of Lansdowne; The Lord Stanley of Preston
- Premier: Honoré Mercier; Charles Boucher de Boucherville
- Preceded by: Louis-Rodrigue Masson
- Succeeded by: Joseph-Adolphe Chapleau

Member of the Canadian Parliament for Montmorency
- In office 14 February 1880 – 12 November 1880
- Preceded by: Pierre-Vincent Valin
- Succeeded by: Pierre-Vincent Valin

Member of the Legislative Assembly of Quebec for Montmorency
- In office 11 February 1874 – 14 February 1880
- Preceded by: Joseph-Édouard Cauchon
- Succeeded by: Charles Langelier

Personal details
- Born: 4 October 1837 Quebec City, Lower Canada
- Died: 14 April 1919 (aged 81) Westmount, Quebec, Canada
- Resting place: Notre Dame des Neiges Cemetery
- Party: Provincial: Conservative; Federal: Conservative
- Spouses: Julie-Marguerite Chinic (m. 1869) Émélie Le Moine (m. 1890)
- Children: 1 daughter and 2 sons
- Education: Université Laval
- Occupation: lawyer, judge
- Profession: politician
- Cabinet: Provincial: Attorney General (1876–1878); Solicitor General (1874–1876); Federal: Minister of Agriculture (1892–1895); President of the Privy Council (1896)

Sir Auguste-Réal Angers PC (4 October 1837 – 14 April 1919) was a Canadian judge and parliamentarian, holding seats both as a member of the House of Commons of Canada, and as a Senator. He was born in 1837 probably in Quebec City and died in Westmount, Quebec, in 1919.

He served in the cabinets of Sir John Sparrow David Thompson and Sir Mackenzie Bowell as Minister of Agriculture and as President of the Privy Council under Sir Charles Tupper. He also served as a Member of the Legislative Assembly of Quebec after being elected in Montmorency in 1874 as a Conservative.

He was knighted in the 1913 New Year Honours.

After his death in 1919, he was entombed at the Notre Dame des Neiges Cemetery in Montreal.

== Early life ==
There is an element of mystery around Auguste's birth. Historians generally agree he was born on 4 October 1837 but no substantial birth certificate has ever been found. The 1901 census lists his birth as 4 October.

Angers studied at the Séminaire de Nicolet between 1849 and 1856. He eventually went on to study law at the Université de Laval. He then went on to join a prospering law firm in Quebec City. After building a strong background for politics, he went on to easily won a provincial by-election in Montmorency for the Conservatives.

== Delve into Politics ==
After being re-elected to his seat in Montmorency, in 1875 he was appointed as Government leader in the Legislative Assembly and Attorney General in 1876. Since the Premier of Quebec at the time Charles Boucher de Boucherville was sitting in the Legislative Council, the appointed Upper Chamber of the Province, Angers acted as the voice to the government in the Legislative Assembly helping pass key legislation. He continued to act in this role for multiple years.

In 1879, Angers lost his seat by 14 votes in a general election. Afterwards, he ran for Federal Parliament in a by-election winning the Montmorency seat. Shortly afterwards he was appointed as puisne judge of the Superior Court for Montmagny district.

He settled down in a town on the St. Lawrence River.

In 1887 Angers accepted an appointment making him Lieutenant Governor of the province of Quebec.

In December 1892 he accepted an appointment as a Senator and was given an agriculture portfolio in John Sparrow David Thompson's Ministry. He continued in this capacity until 1895 where he resigned and briefly took up the post of President of the Privy Council before retiring from politics.

In 1895, Angers was offered an appointment to the Supreme Court of Canada, but he declined the offer.

== Later life ==
Angers moved to Montreal where he returned to practicing law and in 1911 he was appointed as legal counsel to the Montreal Harbour Commission.

== Archives ==
There are Auguste-Réal Angers fonds at Library and Archives Canada and Bibliothèque et Archives nationales du Québec.
