= Québec-Est (provincial electoral district) =

Quebec electoral district

Defunct provincial electoral district
- Legislature: National Assembly of Quebec
- District created: 1867
- District abolished: 1965
- First contested: 1867
- Last contested: 1962

Québec-Est was a former provincial electoral district in the Capitale-Nationale region of Quebec, Canada. It was located in the general area of Quebec City. It elected members to the Legislative Assembly of Quebec.

It was created for the 1867 election. Its final election was in 1962. It disappeared in the 1966 election and its successor electoral district was Limoilou.

== Members of the Legislative Assembly ==
- Jacques-Philippe Rhéaume, Conservative Party (1867–1873)
- Charles Alphonse Pantaléon Pelletier, Liberal (1873–1874)
- Pierre-Vincent Valin, Conservative Party (1874–1875)
- Joseph Shehyn, Liberal (1875–1900)
- Jules-Alfred Lane, Liberal (1900–1904)
- Albert Jobin, Liberal (1904–1908)
- Louis-Alfred Létourneau, Liberal (1908–1927)
- Oscar Drouin, Liberal (twice) - Action liberale nationale - Union Nationale (1928–1944)
- Henri-Paul Drouin, Liberal (1944–1948)
- Joseph-Onésime Matte, Union Nationale (1948–1952)
- Joseph-Antonin Marquis, Liberal (1952–1956)
- Armand Maltais, Union Nationale (1956–1962)
- Ernest Godbout, Liberal (1962–1966)
