= Montmorency—Charlevoix =

Federal electoral district in Quebec, Canada

Coordinates: 47.62°N 70.91°W

Quebec electoral district
- Interactive map of riding boundaries from the 2025 federal election

Federal electoral district
- Legislature: House of Commons
MP
Gabriel Hardy
Conservative
- District created: 2003
- First contested: 2004
- Last contested: 2021
- District webpage: profile, map

Demographics
- Population (2016): 93,674
- Electors (2019): 76,515
- Area (km²): 11,179.73
- Pop. density (per km²): 8.4
- Census division(s): Charlevoix, Charlevoix-Est, La Côte-de-Beaupré, La Jacques-Cartier, Quebec City
- Census subdivision(s): Quebec City (part), Sainte-Brigitte-de-Laval, La Malbaie, Boischatel, Lac-Beauport, Baie-Saint-Paul, Château-Richer, Beaupré, L'Ange-Gardien, Saint-Ferréol-les-Neiges

Montmorency—Charlevoix (formerly Beauport—Côte-de-Beaupré—Île d'Orléans—Charlevoix) is a federal electoral district (riding) in Quebec, Canada, that has been represented in the House of Commons since 2004. An earlier Charlevoix—Montmorency riding was represented in the House of Commons from 1917 to 1925.

Since 2025, its member of Parliament (MP) has been Gabriel Hardy of the Conservative Party.

== Geography ==
The riding, which extends along the north bank of the Saint Lawrence River northeast of Quebec City on either side of the Saguenay River, straddles the Quebec regions of Capitale-Nationale and Côte-Nord. It consists of the MRCs of Charlevoix, Charlevoix-Est, La Côte-de-Beaupré, L'Île-d'Orléans and La Haute-Côte-Nord, as well as a neighbourhood of southeastern Quebec City.

The neighbouring ridings are Beauport—Limoilou, Saint-Augustin—Portneuf—Jacques-Cartier, Saint-Maurice—Champlain, Lac-Saint-Jean, Jonquière—Hébertville—Pays-des-Bleuets, Chicoutimi—Le Fjord, Côte-Nord—Kawawachikamach—Nitassinan, Côte-du-Sud—Rivière-du-Loup—Kataskomiq—Témiscouata and Bellechasse—Les Etchemins—Lévis.

== Demographics ==
According to the 2021 Canadian census, 2023 representation order

Race: 96.2% White, 1.8% Indigenous
Languages: 97.7% French, 1.5% English
Religions: 75.0% Christian (67.6% Catholic, 7.4% Other), 24.1% None
Median income: $45,200 (2020)
Average income: $53,800 (2020)

== History ==
=== Boundaries ===
The current riding was created in 2003 as Charlevoix—Montmorency from parts of Beauport—Montmorency—Côte-de-Beaupré—Île-d'Orléans, Charlesbourg—Jacques-Cartier and Charlevoix ridings. Its name was changed to Montmorency—Charlevoix—Haute-Côte-Nord after the 2004 election.

Following the Canadian federal electoral redistribution, 2012, the riding was renamed Beauport—Côte-de-Beaupré—Île d'Orléans—Charlevoix from Montmorency—Charlevoix—Haute-Côte-Nord, with the eastern part of the riding becoming a part of the neighbouring riding of Manicouagan.

Following the 2022 Canadian federal electoral redistribution, the riding was largely be replaced by Montmorency—Charlevoix. It lost the Chutes-Montmorency area to Beauport—Limoilou, gained the territory east of Ch. de Château-Bigot and Av. du Bourg-Royal and north of Boul. Louis-XIV from Charlesbourg—Haute-Saint-Charles, and gained the municipalities of Lac-Beauport and Sainte-Brigitte-de-Laval from Portneuf—Jacques-Cartier.

The riding of Charlevoix—Montmorency also existed from 1914 to 1924. It was created from parts of Charlevoix, Chicoutimi—Saguenay and Montmorency ridings. It initially consisted of the parishes of St. Tite, St. Féréol, St. Joachim, Château Richer, Ste. Anne and the village of Ste. Anne.

The electoral district was abolished in 1924 when it was redistributed into Charlevoix—Saguenay and Quebec—Montmorency ridings. Its only Member of Parliament was Pierre-François Casgrain of the Liberal Party of Canada. The renamed Beauport—Côte-de-Beaupré—Île d'Orléans—Charlevoix riding lost territory to Manicouagan and Beauport—Limoilou, and gained territory from Beauport—Limoilou during the 2012 electoral redistribution.

=== Members of Parliament ===
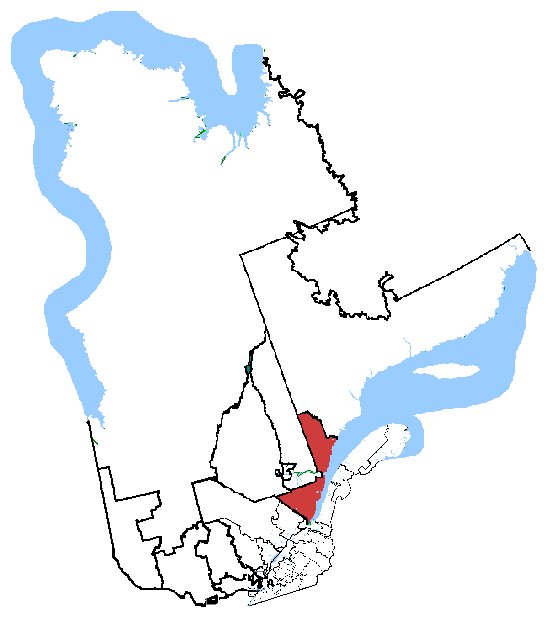
Montmorency—Charlevoix—Haute-Côte-Nord in relation to other Quebec federal electoral districts

This riding has elected the following members of Parliament:

Parliament	Years	Member	Party
Charlevoix—Montmorency; Riding created from Charlevoix, Chicoutimi—Saguenay and Montmorency
13th	1917–1921	Pierre-François Casgrain	Liberal
14th	1921–1925	Pierre-François Casgrain	Liberal
Riding dissolved into Charlevoix—Saguenay and Québec—Montmorency
Riding re-created from Beauport—Montmorency—Côte-de-Beaupré—Île-d'Orléans, Charlesbourg—Jacques-Cartier and Charlevoix
38th	2004–2006	Michel Guimond	Bloc Québécois
Montmorency—Charlevoix—Haute-Côte-Nord
39th	2006–2008	Michel Guimond	Bloc Québécois
40th	2008–2011	Michel Guimond	Bloc Québécois
41st	2011–2015	Jonathan Tremblay	New Democratic
Beauport—Côte-de-Beaupré—Île d'Orléans—Charlevoix
42nd	2015–2019	Sylvie Boucher	Conservative
43rd	2019–2021	Caroline Desbiens	Bloc Québécois
44th	2021–2025	Caroline Desbiens	Bloc Québécois
Montmorency—Charlevoix
45th	2025–present	Gabriel Hardy	Conservative

== Election results ==
View source data.
Graph of election results in Beauport—Côte-de-Beaupré—Île d'Orléans—Charlevoix (since 2004, minor parties that never got 2% of the vote or didn't run consistently are omitted)

=== Montmorency—Charlevoix ===
2025 Canadian federal election
Party	Candidate	Votes	%	±%	Expenditures
Conservative	Gabriel Hardy	20,494	34.50	+0.62	$59,683.49
Bloc Québécois	Caroline Desbiens	19,970	33.62	−3.08	$48,119.30
Liberal	Alex Ouellet-Bélanger	17,101	28.79	+8.58	$15,894.68
New Democratic	Gérard Briand	905	1.52	−3.11	$0.00
Green	Élie Prud'Homme-Tessier	580	0.98	−0.22	$0.00
People's	Bart Cortenbach	357	0.60	−1.28	$18.05
Total valid votes/expenses limit		59,407	98.78	+0.49	$135,699.92
Total rejected ballots		732	1.22	-0.49	
Turnout		60,139	72.23	+5.99	
Eligible voters		83,265			
Conservative notional gain from Bloc Québécois		Swing		+1.85	
Source: Elections Canada
Note: number of eligible voters does not include voting day registrations.

2021 federal election redistributed results
Party	Vote	%
Bloc Québécois	19,309	36.70
Conservative	17,825	33.88
Liberal	10,630	20.20
New Democratic	2,436	4.63
People's	991	1.88
Green	627	1.19
Free	503	0.96
Independent	184	0.35
Rhinoceros	110	0.21
Total valid votes	52,615	98.29
Rejected ballots	914	1.71
Registered voters/ estimated turnout	53,529	66.23

=== Beauport—Côte-de-Beaupré—Île d'Orléans—Charlevoix, 2015–2025 ===
2021 Canadian federal election: Beauport—Côte-de-Beaupré—Île d'Orléans—Charlevoix
Party	Candidate	Votes	%	±%	Expenditures
Bloc Québécois	Caroline Desbiens	19,270	38.44	+2.09	$27,050.37
Conservative	Véronique Laprise	15,969	31.85	+2.14	$25,427.63
Liberal	Alexandra Bernier	10,365	20.67	–0.28	$7,031.80
New Democratic	Frédéric du Verle	2,242	4.47	–1.14	$320.79
People's	Jennifer Lefrançois	881	1.76	–0.30	$0.00
Green	Frédéric Amyot	733	1.46	–1.22	$0.00
Free	Chantal Laplante	449	0.90	–	$409.94
Independent	Vicky Lépine	227	0.45	–	$0.00
Total valid votes/expense limit		50,136	100.00	–	$115,228.60
Total rejected ballots		902	1.77	–0.12	
Turnout		51,038	65.64	–1.69	
Registered voters		77,752			
Bloc Québécois hold		Swing		–0.03	
Source: Elections Canada

2019 Canadian federal election: Beauport—Côte-de-Beaupré—Île d'Orléans—Charlevoix
Party	Candidate	Votes	%	±%	Expenditures
Bloc Québécois	Caroline Desbiens	18,407	36.35	+17.21	$10,197.29
Conservative	Sylvie Boucher	15,044	29.71	-3.82	none listed
Liberal	Manon Fortin	10,608	20.95	-5.94	none listed
New Democratic	Gérard Briand	2,841	5.61	-12.85	none listed
Green	Richard Guertin	1,355	2.68	+0.98	$5,913.35
No affiliation	Raymond Bernier	1,335	2.64	–	$5,886.96
People's	Jean-Claude Parent	1,045	2.06	–	none listed
Total valid votes/expense limit		50,635	98.11		
Total rejected ballots		976	1.89		
Turnout		51,611	67.33		
Eligible voters		76,657			
Bloc Québécois gain from Conservative		Swing		+10.52	
Source: Elections Canada

2015 Canadian federal election: Beauport—Côte-de-Beaupré—Île d'Orléans—Charlevoix
Party	Candidate	Votes	%	±%	Expenditures
Conservative	Sylvie Boucher	16,903	33.53	+10.53	$46,981.59
Liberal	Jean-Roger Vigneau	13,556	26.89	+21.55	$23,600.03
Bloc Québécois	Sébastien Dufour	9,650	19.14	-12.51	$32,235.25
New Democratic	Jonathan Tremblay	9,306	18.46	-19.79	$32,591.88
Green	Patrick Kerr	859	1.70	-0.01	–
Strength in Democracy	Mario Desjardins Pelchat	182	0.36	–	–
Total valid votes/Expense limit		50,406	100.0		$220,163.31
Total rejected ballots		846	–	–	
Turnout		51,302	–	–	
Eligible voters		76,452			
Source: Elections Canada

2011 federal election redistributed results
Party	Vote	%
New Democratic	18,041	38.25
Bloc Québécois	14,931	31.65
Conservative	10,851	23.00
Liberal	2,517	5.34
Green	805	1.71
Others	26	0.06

=== Montmorency—Charlevoix—Haute-Côte-Nord, 2006–2015 ===
2011 Canadian federal election
Party	Candidate	Votes	%	±%	Expenditures
New Democratic	Jonathan Tremblay	17,601	37.3	+29.6	
Bloc Québécois	Michel Guimond	16,425	34.9	-14.0	
Conservative	Michel-Éric Castonguay	9,660	20.5	-6.9	
Liberal	Robert Gauthier	2,628	5.6	-7.8	
Green	François Bédard	814	1.7	-1.0	
Total valid votes/Expense limit		47,128	100.0		
Total rejected ballots		627	1.3		
Turnout		47,755	62.5		
Eligible voters		76,447	–	–	

2008 Canadian federal election
Party	Candidate	Votes	%	±%	Expenditures
Bloc Québécois	Michel Guimond	21,068	48.9	-0.2	$75,870
Conservative	Guy-Léonard Tremblay	11,789	27.4	-4.9	$49,012
Liberal	Robert Gauthier	5,769	13.4	+4.5	$8,636
New Democratic	Jonathan Tremblay	3,332	7.7	+1.3	$4,896
Green	Jacques Legros	1,147	2.7	-0.7	$1,949
Total valid votes/Expense limit		43,105	100.0	$91,713	
Total rejected ballots		547	1.3		
Turnout		43,652			

2006 Canadian federal election
Party	Candidate	Votes	%	±%	Expenditures
Bloc Québécois	Michel Guimond	22,169	49.1	-11.8	$73,307
Conservative	Yves Laberge	14,559	32.3	+19.7	$38,035
Liberal	Robert Gauthier	3,989	8.8	-11.7	$18,501
New Democratic	Martin Cauchon	2,896	6.4	+3.9	$2,819
Green	Yves Jourdain	1,527	3.4	0.0	
Total valid votes/Expense limit		45,140	100.0	$85,353	

=== Charlevoix—Montmorency, 2004–2006 ===
2004 Canadian federal election
Party	Candidate	Votes	%	±%	Expenditures
Bloc Québécois	Michel Guimond	25,451	60.9		$68,686
Liberal	Lisette Lepage	8,598	20.6	–	$40,277
Conservative	Guy-Léonard Tremblay	5,259	12.6	–	$25,341
Green	Yves Jourdain	1,422	3.4		
New Democratic	Steeve Hudon	1,055	2.5		$550
Total valid votes/Expense limit		41,785	100.0	$83,357	

=== Charlevoix—Montmorency, 1917–1925 ===
1921 Canadian federal election
Party	Candidate	Votes	%	±%
Liberal	Pierre-François Casgrain	7,727	72.7	-24.9
Conservative	Louis de Gonzague Belley	2,902	27.3	+24.9
Total valid votes		10,629	100.0	

Note: Conservative vote is compared to Government vote in 1917 election, and Liberal vote is compared to Opposition vote

1917 Canadian federal election
Party	Candidate	Votes	%
Opposition (Laurier Liberals)	Pierre-François Casgrain	5,197	97.6
Government (Unionist)	Philippe Bouchard	129	2.4
Total valid votes		5,326	100.0

== See also ==
- List of Canadian electoral districts
- Historical federal electoral districts of Canada
