= Charlevoix—Saguenay (federal electoral district) =

Former federal electoral district in Quebec, Canada

Quebec electoral district

Defunct federal electoral district
- Legislature: House of Commons
- District created: 1924
- District abolished: 1947
- First contested: 1925
- Last contested: 1945

Charlevoix—Saguenay (French pronunciation: [ʃaʁləvwa saɡnɛ]) was a federal electoral district in Quebec, Canada, that was represented in the House of Commons of Canada from 5 September 1925 to 29 April 1949.

== History ==
This riding was created in 1924 from parts of Charlevoix—Montmorency and Chicoutimi—Saguenay ridings.

It initially consisted of the Counties of Charlevoix-East, Charlevoix-West and Saguenay, l'Isle-aux-Coudres, the territories of Ashuanipi and New Quebec, the Island of Anticosti and the County of Montmorency No. 1, excluding the municipalities of St. Jean de Boischatel, L'Ange Gardien and Ste. Brigitte de Laval.

In 1933, it was redefined to consist of

- the counties of Charlevoix-East and Charlevoix-West and l'Ile aux Coudres;
- the county of Saguenay and the Island of Anticosti;
- the county of Montmorency No. 1, excepting the parts included in the municipalities of St-Jean-de-Boischatel and L'Ange-Gardien; and
- the territory of New Quebec.

The district was abolished in 1947 when it was redistributed into Charlevoix and Saguenay ridings.

== Members of Parliament ==
This riding elected the following members of Parliament:

Parliament	Years	Member	Party
Charlevoix—Saguenay; Riding created from Charlevoix—Montmorency and Chicoutimi—Saguenay
15th	1925–1926	Pierre-François Casgrain	Liberal
16th	1926–1930	Pierre-François Casgrain	Liberal
17th	1930–1935	Pierre-François Casgrain	Liberal
18th	1935–1940	Pierre-François Casgrain	Liberal
19th	1940–1941	Pierre-François Casgrain	Liberal
19th	1942–1945	Frédéric Dorion	Independent
20th	1945–1949	Frédéric Dorion	Independent
Riding dissolved into Charlevoix and Saguenay

== Election results ==
1925 Canadian federal election
Party	Candidate	Votes
Liberal	Pierre-François Casgrain	8,312
Conservative	Jules Gobeil	3,046
Independent Liberal	Alcibiade Leger	143

1926 Canadian federal election
Party	Candidate	Votes
Liberal	Pierre-François Casgrain	8,553
Conservative	Jules Gobeil	2,911

1930 Canadian federal election
Party	Candidate	Votes
Liberal	Pierre-François Casgrain	10,806
Conservative	Thomas Maher	8,078

1935 Canadian federal election
Party	Candidate	Votes
Liberal	Pierre-François Casgrain	12,144
Conservative	Henri D'Auteuil	5,591
Reconstruction	Murray Warren	808

1940 Canadian federal election
Party	Candidate	Votes
Liberal	Pierre-François Casgrain	14,336
National Government	Antoine Cimon	5,928

By-election: On Mr. Casgrain accepting an office of emolument under the Crown, 15 December 1941.

By-election on 30 November 1942
Party	Candidate	Votes
Independent	Frédéric Dorion	9,773
Independent Liberal	Thérèse Casgrain	6,706
Independent Liberal	J. Emile Boivin	2,578
Independent Liberal	J. Donat Lacroix	209
Unknown	Edouard Gaudreault	189

1945 Canadian federal election
Party	Candidate	Votes
Independent	Frédéric Dorion	12,430
Liberal	Louis-Philippe Dufour	9,197
Social Credit	Louis-Philippe-Antoine Belanger	1,151
Independent Liberal	Donat Lacroix	436

== See also ==
- List of Canadian electoral districts
- Historical federal electoral districts of Canada
