= Pierre-François Casgrain =

Canadian politician (1886–1950)

The Honourable Pierre-François Casgrain P.C.
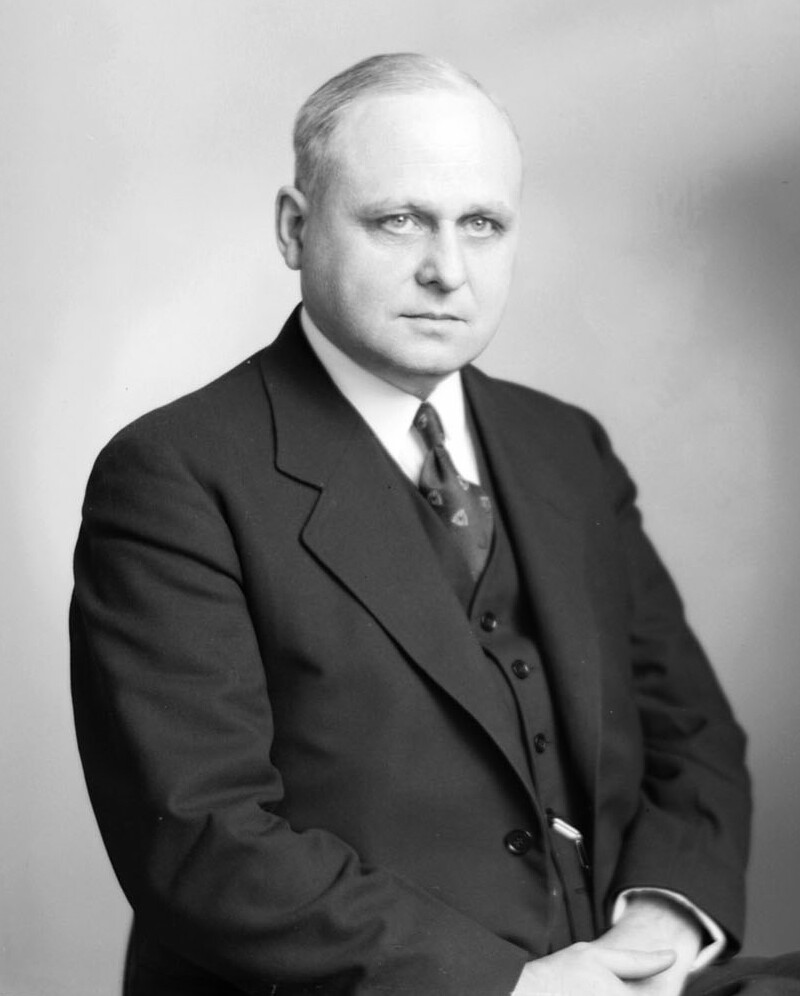
- Casgrain, c. 1937

19th Speaker of the House of Commons of Canada
- In office February 6, 1936 – May 10, 1940
- Preceded by: James Langstaff Bowman
- Succeeded by: James Allison Glen

Member of the Canadian Parliament for Charlevoix—Montmorency
- In office 1917–1925
- Preceded by: new riding
- Succeeded by: riding abolished

Member of Parliament for Charlevoix—Saguenay
- In office 1925–1941
- Preceded by: new riding
- Succeeded by: Frédéric Dorion

Personal details
- Born: August 4, 1886 Montreal, Quebec
- Died: August 2, 1950 (aged 63)
- Resting place: Notre Dame des Neiges Cemetery
- Party: Laurier-Liberal (1917–1921); Liberal Party of Canada (1921–1941)
- Spouse: Thérèse Casgrain
- Profession: lawyer
- Cabinet: Secretary of State of Canada (1940–1941)

Pierre-François Casgrain, PC (August 4, 1886 – August 2, 1950) was a Canadian lawyer and politician. He was Speaker of the Canadian House of Commons from 1936 to 1940.

Born in Montreal, Quebec, his father was a physician. Following the death of his mother when he was three years old, he was raised by his grandmother. Casgrain graduated in law from Université Laval in Montreal and practiced in Montreal where he worked as an organizer for the Liberal Party of Canada and the Quebec Liberal Party.

When his father-in-law, Sir Rodolphe Forget, the Conservative Member of Parliament (MP) for Charlevoix, retired from politics, Casgrain decided to run for the seat as a Liberal in the 1917 election. The campaign occurred as a result of the Conscription Crisis of 1917. Casgrain ran as an opponent of the draft (see Laurier Liberals, and was elected to the House of Commons of Canada.

From 1921 to 1925, Casgrain was the parliamentary whip of the Quebec Liberal caucus, and from 1926 to 1936, he was the Chief Whip of the Liberal caucus.

Casgrain was nominated by Prime Minister William Lyon Mackenzie King to be Speaker of the House in 1936. He served in this position until 1940 when he was appointed to the Cabinet as Secretary of State for Canada, a position that had sweeping emergency powers during World War II. On December 15, 1941, Casgrain was appointed Puisne Judge of the Superior Court of Quebec and retired from politics. He died in 1950.

After his death in 1950, he was entombed at the Notre Dame des Neiges Cemetery in Montreal.

Casgrain's wife, Thérèse Casgrain, was a prominent political figure in her own right.

There is a Pierre-François Casgrain fonds at Library and Archives Canada.

Political offices
Preceded by George William Kyte	Chief Government Whip; 1924-1926	Succeeded by William Alves Boys
Preceded by William Alves Boys	Chief Government Whip; 1927-1930	Succeeded by Thomas Edward Simpson
