= Michel Guimond =

Canadian politician

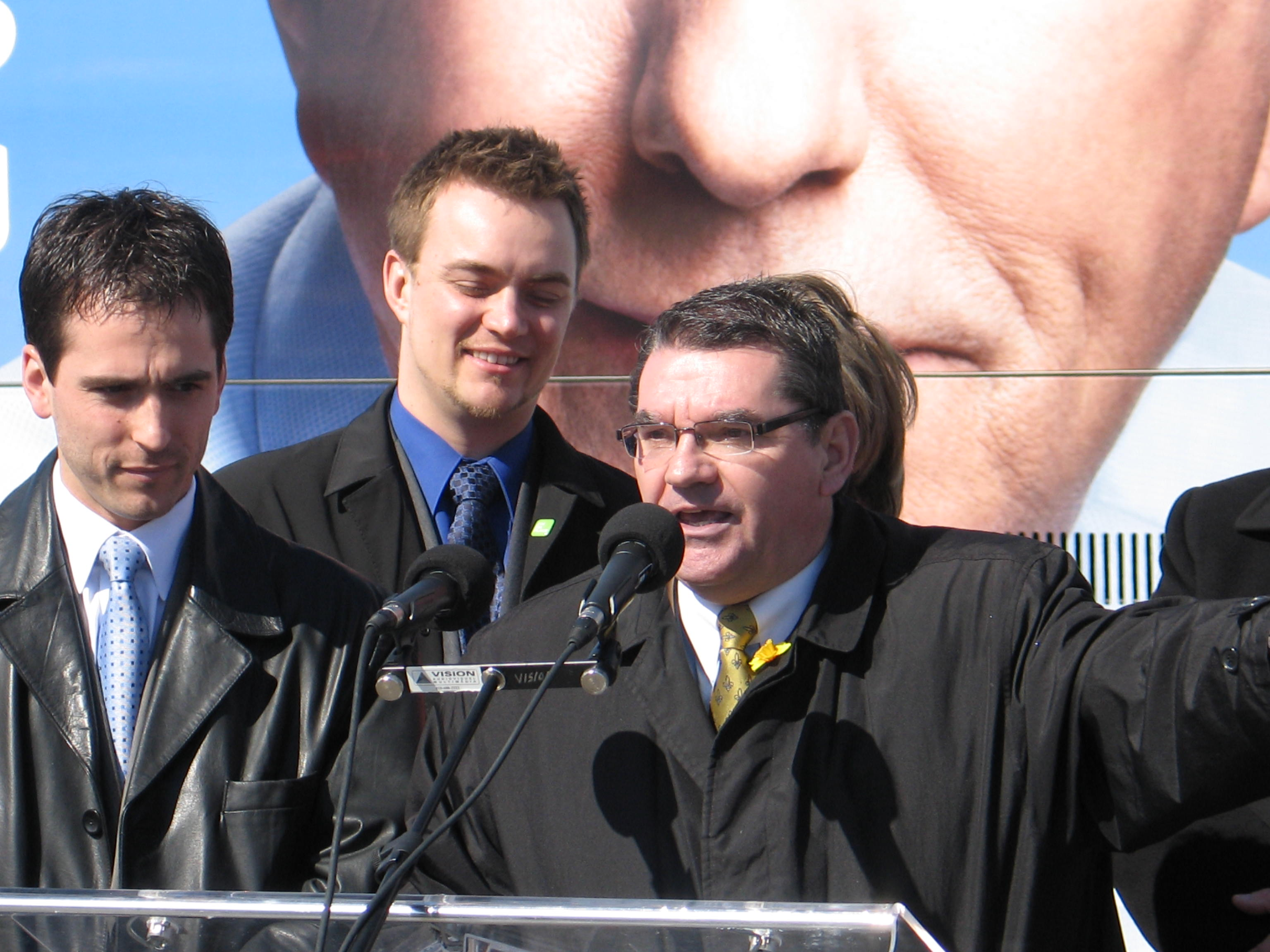
- Michel Guimond speaking at a press conference during the 2011 election campaign

Member of Parliament for Montmorency—Charlevoix—Haute-Côte-Nord
- In office October 25, 1993 – May 2, 2011
- Preceded by: Charles Deblois
- Succeeded by: Jonathan Tremblay

Personal details
- Born: December 26, 1953 Chicoutimi, Quebec, Canada
- Died: January 19, 2015 (aged 61) Boischatel, Quebec, Canada
- Party: Bloc Québécois, Parti Québécois
- Spouse: Mariette Langlois
- Profession: attorney

Michel Guimond (December 26, 1953 – January 19, 2015) was a Canadian politician. From 1987 to 1993 he served as a city councillor in Boischatel, Quebec. After this, he ran in the 1993 federal election for the Bloc Québécois. He was elected into the House of Commons of Canada as the member from Beauport—Montmorency—Orléans. He was re-elected in the 1997 and 2000 federal elections (in the riding of Beauport—Montmorency—Côte-de-Beaupré—Île-d'Orléans) and in the 2004 federal election (in the riding of Charlevoix—Montmorency). In the 2004 and 2008 elections, he won in Montmorency—Charlevoix—Haute-Côte-Nord before being defeated in the 2011 federal election. A lawyer, he has served as the Bloc critic of Parliamentary Affairs, Transport and to the Auditor General. He then served as whip and deputy whip of the Bloc Québécois, and was also the vice-chair of the Standing Committee on Procedure and House Affairs.

In the 2014 provincial election, he ran unsuccessfully for the Parti Québécois to represent the riding of Montmorency.

Guimond died of heart failure on January 19, 2015.

== Electoral record ==
=== Montmorency ===
2014 Quebec general election
Party	Candidate	Votes	%
Liberal	Raymond Bernier	17,113	40.42
Coalition Avenir Québec	Michelyne St-Laurent	14,323	33.83
Parti Québécois	Michel Guimond	7,242	17.11
Québec solidaire	Jean-Pierre Duchesneau	1,981	4.68
Conservative	Adrien Pouliot	1,015	2.40
Green	Marielle Parent	407	0.96
Option nationale	Jean Bouchard	255	1.51
Total valid votes		42,336	98.89
Total rejected ballots		476	1.11
Turnout		42,812	77.00
Electors on the lists		55,950	–

=== Montmorency—Charlevoix—Haute-Côte-Nord ===
2011 Canadian federal election
Party	Candidate	Votes	%	±%
New Democratic	Jonathan Tremblay	17,601	37.3%	+29.6%
Bloc Québécois	Michel Guimond	16,425	34.9%	-14.0%
Conservative	Michel-Éric Castonguay	9,660	20.5%	-6.9%
Liberal	Robert Gauthier	2,628	5.6%	-7.8%
Green	François Bédard	814	1.7%	-1.0%
Total valid votes		47,128	100%	
Total rejected ballots		627	1.3%	
Turnout		47,755	62.5%	
Eligible voters		76,447		

Source: Elections Canada

2008 Canadian federal election
Party	Candidate	Votes	%	±%
Bloc Québécois	Michel Guimond	21,068	48.9%	-0.2%
Conservative	Guy-Léonard Tremblay	11,789	27.4%	-4.9%
Liberal	Robert Gauthier	5,769	13.4%	+4.5%
New Democratic	Jonathan Tremblay	3,332	7.7%	+1.3%
Green	Jacques Legros	1,147	2.7%	-0.7%
Total valid votes		43,105	100.0%	
Total rejected ballots		547		
Turnout		–	%	

2006 Canadian federal election
Party	Candidate	Votes	%	±%
Bloc Québécois	Michel Guimond	22,169	49.1%	-11.8%
Conservative	Yves Laberge	14,559	32.3%	+19.7%
Liberal	Robert Gauthier	3,989	8.8%	-11.7%
New Democratic	Martin Cauchon	2,896	6.4%	+3.9%
Green	Yves Jourdain	1,527	3.4%	0.0%
Total valid votes		45,140	100.0%	

=== Charlevoix—Montmorency, 2004 ===
2004 Canadian federal election
Party	Candidate	Votes	%
Bloc Québécois	Michel Guimond	25,451	60.9%
Liberal	Lisette Lepage	8,598	20.6%
Conservative	Guy-Léonard Tremblay	5,259	12.6%
Green	Yves Jourdain	1,422	3.4%
New Democratic	Steeve Hudon	1,055	2.5%
Total valid votes		41,785	100.0%

=== 1997 and 2000 federal elections ===
2000 Canadian federal election: Beauport—Montmorency—Côte-de-Beaupré—Île-d'Orléans
Party	Candidate	Votes	%	±%	Expenditures
Bloc Québécois	Michel Guimond	21,341	41.55		$64,900
Liberal	Chantal Plante	18,714	36.43	–	$39,207
Alliance	Robert Giroux	5,878	11.44		$1,327
Progressive Conservative	Lise Bernier	2,916	5.68		not listed
Marijuana	Mathieu Giroux	1,364	2.66		$10
New Democratic	Eric Hébert	869	1.69		not listed
Marxist–Leninist	Jean Bédard	283	0.55		$10
Total valid votes		51,365	100.00		
Total rejected ballots		1,481			
Turnout		52,846	65.88		
Electors on the lists		80,217			
Sources: Official Results, Elections Canada and Financial Returns, Elections Canada.

1997 Canadian federal election: Beauport—Montmorency—Orléans
Party	Candidate	Votes	%	±%	Expenditures
Bloc Québécois	Michel Guimond	21,994	42.99		$56,578
Liberal	Simone Gosselin	13,863	27.10	–	$44,404
Progressive Conservative	Michel Cliche	12,748	24.92		$25,083
Reform	Yves Baribeau	1,255	2.45		$4,147
New Democratic	Jessica Greenberg	885	1.73		$0
Marxist–Leninist	Jean Bédard	419	0.82		$0
Total valid votes		51,164	100.00		
Total rejected ballots		2,136			
Turnout		53,300	70.28		
Electors on the lists		75,840			
Sources: Official Results, Elections Canada and Financial Returns, Elections Canada.

Political offices
Preceded by Richard Bélisle, BQ	Chairman of the Public Accounts Committee; 1996-1997	Succeeded by John G. Williams, Reform
