= Thérèse Casgrain =

French-Canadian suffragist, politician and activist (1896-1981)

The Honourable Thérèse Forget Casgrain CC OBE
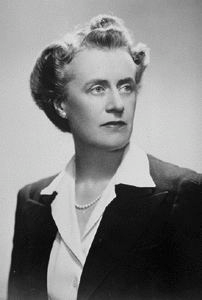
- Thérèse Forget Casgrain, c. 1942

Senator for Mille Isles, Quebec
- In office October 7, 1970 – July 10, 1971
- Appointed by: Pierre Trudeau
- Preceded by: Gustave Monette
- Succeeded by: Renaude Lapointe

Leader of the Parti social démocratique du Québec
- In office 1951–1957
- Preceded by: Romuald-Joseph Lamoureux
- Succeeded by: Michel Chartrand

Personal details
- Born: July 10, 1896 Montreal, Quebec, Canada
- Died: November 3, 1981 (aged 85) Montreal
- Party: Co-operative Commonwealth Federation (1945-1961); Parti social démocratique du Québec, New Democratic Party (1961-1970); Independent
- Spouse: Pierre-François Casgrain (1916–1950; his death)
- Relations: Sir Rodolphe Forget, father
- Children: Two daughters, two sons

Marie Thérèse Casgrain CC OBE (née Forget; 10 July 1896 – 3 November 1981) was a Canadian feminist, reformer, politician and senator. She was a leader in the fight for women's right to vote in the province of Quebec, as well as the first woman to lead a political party in Canada. In her later life she opposed nuclear weapons and was a consumer activist. A strong federalist, one of her last political actions, at age 83, was to intervene on the "No" side in the 1980 Quebec sovereignty referendum.

== Family and early life ==
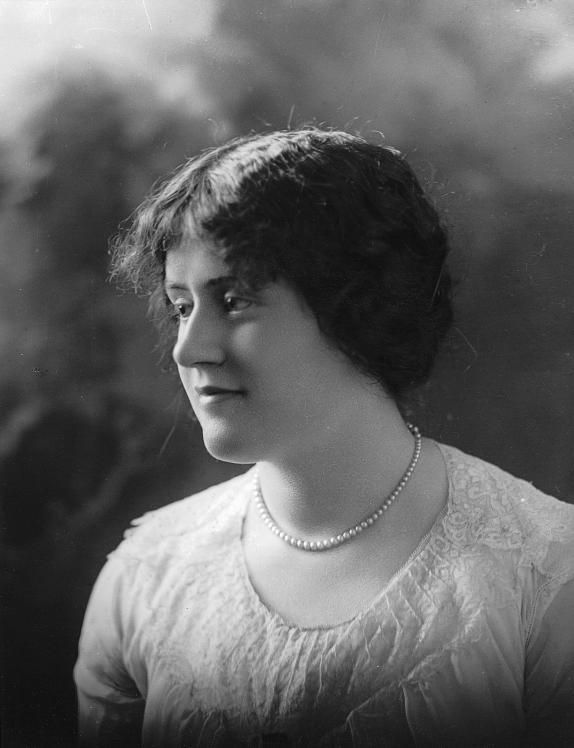
Thérèse Forget, 1914

Born in Montreal, Thérèse was raised in a wealthy family, the daughter of Blanche, Lady Forget (née MacDonald), and Sir Rodolphe Forget, a wealthy entrepreneur and Conservative Member of Parliament.

In 1905, at eight years old, she became a boarder at the Dames du Sacré-Coeur, at Sault-au-Récollet, near Montreal. Upon graduation, she hoped to further her studies at university, but her father opposed the idea, not seeing any utility in further education for women. In his view, Thérèse should instead learn how to manage a household, a skill that would befit a future wife of her stature.

Thérèse was engaged twice. Her first fiancé died falling out of a window while sleepwalking, when she was only seventeen years old. In 1916, aged twenty, she married Pierre-François Casgrain, a wealthy Liberal politician with whom she raised four children.

Thérèse's father, Sir Rodolphe, had represented the Charlevoix riding since the general election of 1904, holding it as a Conservative. However, he was opposed to conscription and with the Conscription Crisis looming, he decided that he would not stand for re-election in the general election of 1917. Her husband, Pierre Casgrain, sought the nomination in the new Charlevoix—Montmorency riding for the Liberal Party as a Laurier Liberal, opposed to conscription. He was elected in the general election.

== Women's right to vote ==
Thérèse Casgrain accompanied her husband to Ottawa, the national capital, for the opening of the parliamentary session in the spring of 1918. It was during her time in Ottawa that she became aware of the importance of the right to vote for women. Prior to the 1917 Canadian federal election, women did not have the right to vote in federal elections. In the lead-up to the election, the government of Prime Minister Borden had enacted the Wartime Elections Act, which gave the right to vote to wives, widows, mothers, and sisters of soldiers serving overseas. Although this was a clear attempt to gain votes in favour of the war effort, it was a significant milestone for women's suffrage in Canada. The Borden government would later adopt the Women's Suffrage Act, which gave the right to vote at federal elections to all Canadian women aged twenty-one years or older, from 1919 onwards.

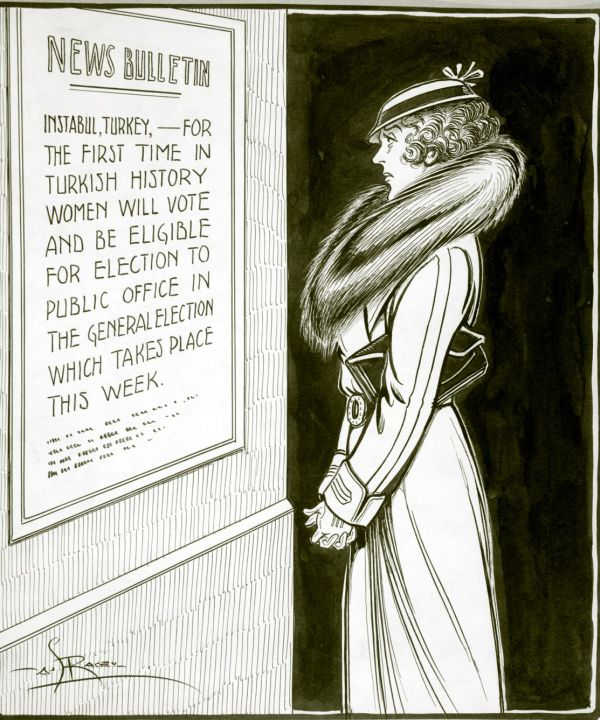
Political cartoon commenting on denial of vote to Quebec women, 1930

In spite of these changes at the federal level, and the expansion of women's suffrage in most other provinces, women in Quebec still could not vote during provincial elections. The opposition for such an extension of the law was strong, notably from the clergy and the conservative elite.

Casgrain led the women's suffrage movement in Quebec for twenty years. Her tenacity, her political contacts through her husband (who eventually became Speaker of the House of Commons), her leadership and her ability to inspire, all helped her to achieve her goal of women's right to vote in Quebec. She founded the Provincial Franchise Committee in 1921 and campaigned for women's rights, writing innumerable letters to influential people, making annual trips to the provincial capital at Quebec City, and broadcasts on radio, speaking for women's rights. From 1928 to 1942, she was the leader of the League for Women's Rights. She founded her own radio show in the 1930s, Fémina. Finally in 1938, she succeeded in having women's right to vote added to the platform of the Liberal Party of Quebec. The right was not won until 1940.

== Electoral politics ==
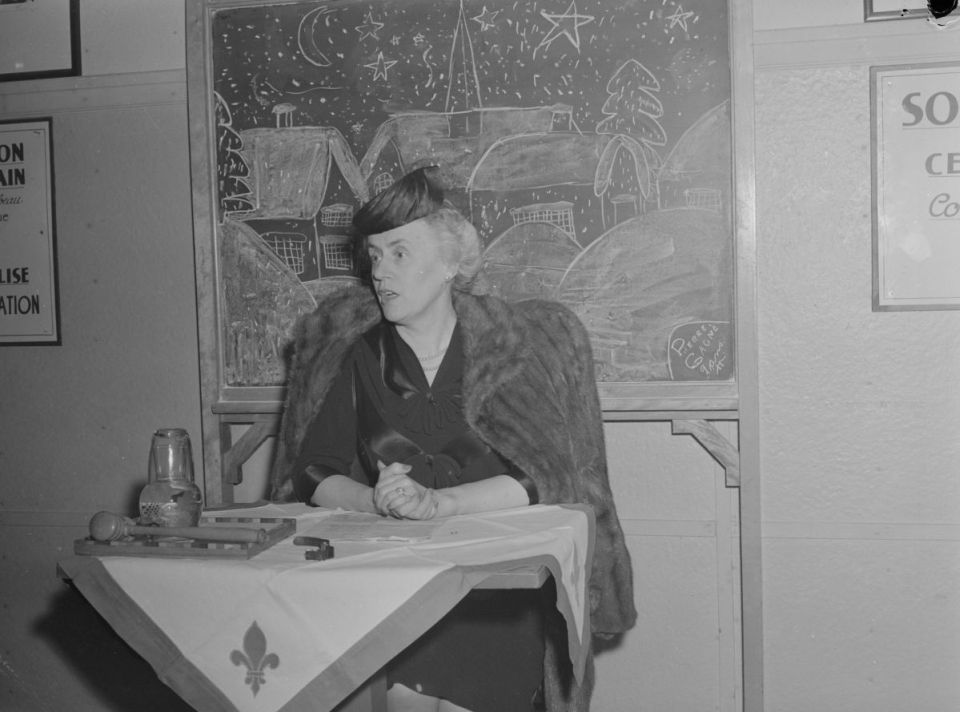
Thérèse Casgrain lectures at the Family Consumer Cooperative Saint-Hubert Street in Montreal. January 14, 1945

In late 1941, Casgrain's husband was appointed to the Superior Court of Quebec. She sought the nomination of the Liberal Party to stand for election in the vacant riding of Charlevoix—Saguenay, the same riding which had been held by her father and then her husband, but the party turned her down. In the resulting federal by-election, she stood as an "Independent Liberal" candidate in the riding, but was not successful.

Following World War II, she left the Liberal Party and joined the social democratic Co-operative Commonwealth Federation (CCF). In 1948, she became one of the federal vice presidents of the CCF. She led the Quebec wing of the party, the Parti social démocratique du Québec, from 1951 to 1957. She was, therefore, the first female leader of a political party in Canada. In the 1960s, she was president of the Quebec wing of the New Democratic Party, the CCF's successor.

Casgrain was a CCF candidate in a 1952 federal by-election and in the 1953, 1957, and 1958 federal general elections and a New Democratic Party candidate in the 1962 and 1963 federal general elections. She also used her position as a platform to campaign against the government of Maurice Duplessis.

== Activism ==
In 1945, Casgrain was successful in ensuring that women in Quebec could receive family allowance cheques in their own name. Prior to that time, and only in Quebec, family allowance cheques were only made out to the father. She also agitated for equal treatment of married women in the Quebec justice system.

In the 1960s, she became a campaigner against nuclear weapons, founding in February 1961 the Quebec wing of Voice of Women (VOW) and serving as the national president of VOW from 1962 to 1963. She also was a founder of the La Ligue des droits de l'homme, which in 1978 became the Ligue des droits et libertés, and the Fédération des femmes du Québec.

In 1969, Casgrain was elected president of the Consumers' Association of Canada Quebec section. Casgrain succeeded to an anglophone president, David Macfarlane, who considered that the Quebec section's position was indefensible, as it was dominated by anglophone elements and used English as its primary work language. Many members of the association hoped Casgrain would fix this problem as president.

== Senator and later life ==
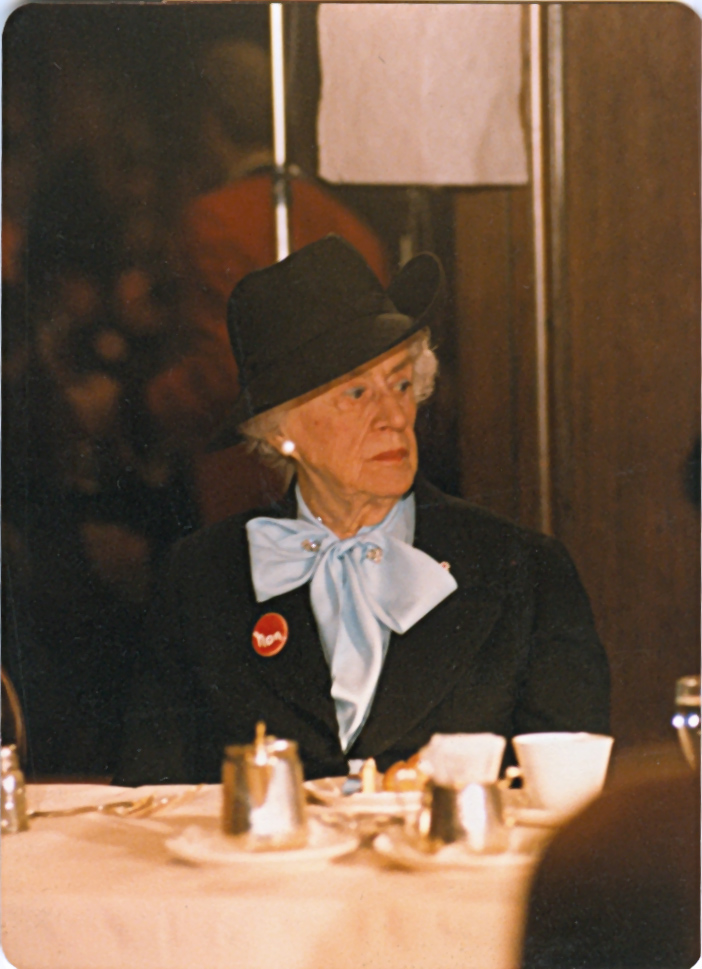
Casgrain in 1980

Prime Minister Pierre Trudeau appointed Casgrain to the Senate of Canada in 1970, where she sat as an independent for nine months before reaching the mandatory retirement age of 75. As senator she questioned the prime minister's policy on the use of Canadian-made napalm and defoliants in Vietnam.

In 1972, she published her autobiography, A Woman in a Man's World.

For the last decade of her life, she was committed to helping the rights of Indigenous women. She also involved herself in charity works and consumer rights.

In spite of her inherited wealth, by the end of her life she was financially dependent on her daughters.

== 1980 Quebec sovereignty referendum ==
During the 1980 Quebec sovereignty referendum, Casgrain campaigned for the "No" side. She was among the voices who criticized Lise Payette, then provincial minister for the status of women, for saying that women who didn't back a "Yes" vote would be responsible for blocking progress. Payette likened them to Yvette, a fictional schoolgirl who featured in school primers.

== Death ==
Thérèse Casgrain died in 1981, living with one of her daughters in Montreal. She is interred in the Cimetière Notre-Dame-des-Neiges in Montreal.

== Assessment ==
It was during her period as a candidate with the CCF and the Parti social démocratique du Québec, that Casgrain acquired the reputation of a "pearl-necklace leftist." Always impeccably dressed and coiffed, with elegant hats, she would make speeches to workers, encouraging them to make their demands known to their employers in companies and mines - companies of which she was often a share-holder, with shares inherited from her businessman father.

== Recognition ==
- 1967: Officer of the Order of Canada
- 1968: received an honorary PhD from the University of Montreal.
- 1974: promoted to Companion of the Order of Canada
- 1974: Loyola College, one of Concordia University's founding institutions, awarded her the Loyola Medal.
- 1979: one of the first recipients of the Governor General's Award in Commemoration of the Persons Case.
- 1980: awarded the title of "Grand Montrealer" from the city of Montreal, in the social category
- 1980: received an honorary doctorate from Concordia University
- 1981: received an honorary PhD from the University of Windsor
- 1982: the federal government created the Thérèse Casgrain Volunteer Award (Note: The Award was originally created by the Liberal government of Pierre Trudeau. It was discontinued in 1990 under the Conservative ministry of Brian Mulroney, but was begun anew in 2001 under the Liberal ministry of Jean Chrétien. In 2010, during the Conservative ministry of Stephen Harper, the award was eliminated and then repackaged as the "Prime Minister's Volunteer Award". In 2016 under the Liberal government of Justin Trudeau the award was once again renamed as the Thérèse Casgrain Lifetime Volunteer Achievement Award.)
- 1985: Canada Post honoured Thérèse Casgrain with a postage stamp
- 1991-1992: received the medal of the Bar of Montreal (a posthumous title).
- 2004: commemorated on the $50 banknote of the Canadian Journey Series, along with The Famous Five. This commemoration was discontinued in 2012 with the introduction of a new design on the reverse of the fifty-dollar bill.
- 2012: statue of Casgrain, along with Marie Lacoste Gérin-Lajoie, Idola Saint-Jean and Marie-Claire Kirkland, unveiled on the grounds of the National Assembly of Quebec by Pauline Marois, first female premier of Quebec, to commemorate the role of women in politics in Quebec
- 2016: appointed commander of the Order of Montreal (a posthumous title)
- 2022: named a National Historic Person by the government of Canada

== Archives ==
The Thérèse-Casgrain fonds is conserved in Ottawa by Library and Archives Canada. The archival reference number is R7906, former archival reference number MG32-C25. The fonds covers the date range 1818 to 1981. It consists of 2.05 metres of textual records and 534 photographs.

The Thérèse F.-Casgrain Foundation fonds is conserved at the Montreal archives centre of the National Library and Archives of Quebec.

== Publications ==
Thérèse F. Casgrain, Une femme chez les hommes (Montréal: Éditions du Jour, 1971)

Thérèse F. Casgrain, A Woman in a Man's World (Toronto: McClelland and Stewart, 1972)
