= Louis Duclos =

Canadian politician

Louis Duclos (born 2 August 1939 in Quebec City, Quebec) was a Liberal party member of the House of Commons of Canada. He was an administrator by career.

He represented the Montmorency electoral district since his victory there in the 1974 federal election. He was re-elected in 1979 and 1980, thus serving in the 30th, 31st and 32nd Canadian Parliaments

Duclos left national politics after his defeat in Montmorency—Orléans, in the 1984 federal election by Anne Blouin of the Progressive Conservative party.
