= Montmorency (federal electoral district) =

Former federal electoral district in Quebec, Canada

Quebec electoral district

Defunct federal electoral district
- Legislature: House of Commons
- District created: 1966
- District abolished: 2003
- First contested: 1968
- Last contested: 2000

Montmorency (French pronunciation: [mɔ̃mɔʁɑ̃si]; also known as Montmorency—Orléans, Beauport—Montmorency—Orléans, and Beauport—Montmorency—Côte-de-Beaupré—Île-d'Orléans) was a federal electoral district in the province of Quebec, Canada, that was represented in the House of Commons of Canada from 1867 to 1917, and from 1968 to 2004.

== History ==
"Montmorency" riding was created by the British North America Act 1867, and was abolished in 1914 when it was redistributed into Charlevoix—Montmorency and Quebec County ridings.

The riding was recreated in 1966 from parts of Charlevoix and Québec—Montmorency.

It was defined in 1966 to consist of:

- the cities of Beauport, Charlesbourg and Giffard;
- the Towns of Beaupré, Courville, Montmorency, Orsainville and Villeneuve;
- the County of Montmorency No. 2 (Island of Orléans);
- in the County of Montmorency No. 1: the village municipalities of Sainte-Anne-de-Beaupré and Saint-Jean-de-Boischatel; the parish municipalities of Château-Richer, L'Ange-Gardien, Sainte-Anne-de-Beaupré, Sainte-Brigitte-de-Laval and Saint-Joachim; the territory without local municipal organization situated northwest of the parish municipalities of Château-Richer, Sainte-Anne-de-Beaupré, Saint-Féréol, the municipality of Saint-Tite-des-Caps and the Town of Beaupré;
- in the County of Québec: the municipalities of Beauport West, Charlesbourg East and Sainte-Thérèse-de-Lisieux.

In 1976, it was redefined to consist of:

- the City of Giffard;
- the Towns of Beaupré, Château-Richer, Courville, Montmorency, Sainte-Anne-de-Beaupré and Villeneuve;
- the County of Montmorency No. 2;
- in the County of Montmorency No. 1: the village municipality of Saint-Jean-de-Boischatel; the parish municipalities of L'Ange-Gardien, Sainte-Brigitte-de-Laval and Saint-Joachim; the territory without local municipal organization situated northwest of the Towns of Château-Richer and Sainte-Anne-de-Beaupré, of the municipality of Saint-Féréol-les-Neiges and of Sainte-Anne-du-Nord River, southeast of the easterly prolongation of the southern limit of the Township of Lescarbot;
- in the County of Québec: the parish municipality of Saint-Michel-Archange and the municipality of Sainte-Thérèse-de-Lisieux.

In 1980, it was renamed "Montmorency—Orléans".

In 1987, it was redefined to consist of the towns of Beauport, Beaupré, Château-Richer and Sainte-Anne-de-Beaupré; the County of Montmorency No. 2; and the County of Montmorency No. 1 excluding the Territory of Montmorency No. 1-Lac-Moncouche portion.

In 1990, it was renamed "Beauport—Montmorency—Orléans".

In 1996, the riding was changed to consist of the cities of Beauport, Beaupré, Château-Richer and Sainte-Anne-de-Beaupré; the County Regional Municipality of L'Île-d'Orléans; and the County Regional Municipality of La Côte-de-Beaupré, excluding the unorganized territory of Lac-Jacques-Cartier.

In 1998, it was renamed "Beauport—Montmorency—Côte-de-Beaupré—Île-d'Orléans".

In 2003, it was abolished when it was redistributed into Beauport and Charlevoix—Montmorency ridings.

== Members of Parliament ==
This riding elected the following members of Parliament:

Parliament	Years	Member	Party
Montmorency
1st	1867–1867	Joseph-Édouard Cauchon	Conservative
1st	1867–1872	Jean Langlois	Conservative
2nd	1872–1874	Jean Langlois	Conservative
3rd	1874–1878	Jean Langlois	Conservative
4th	1878–1880	Pierre-Vincent Valin	Conservative
4th	1880–1880	Auguste-Réal Angers	Conservative
4th	1880–1882	Pierre-Vincent Valin	Conservative
5th	1882–1887	Pierre-Vincent Valin	Conservative
6th	1887–1890	Charles Langelier	Liberal
6th	1890–1891	Louis-Georges Desjardins	Conservative
7th	1891–1892	Joseph-Israël Tarte	Conservative
7th	1892–1896	Arthur Joseph Turcotte	Conservative
8th	1896–1900	Thomas Chase-Casgrain	Conservative
9th	1900–1904	Thomas Chase-Casgrain	Conservative
10th	1904–1908	Georges Parent	Liberal
11th	1908–1911	Georges Parent	Liberal
12th	1911–1917	Rodolphe Forget	Conservative
Riding dissolved into Charlevoix—Montmorency and Quebec County
Riding re-created from Charlevoix and Québec—Montmorency
28th	1968–1972	Ovide Laflamme	Liberal
29th	1972–1974	Ovide Laflamme	Liberal
30th	1974–1979	Louis Duclos	Liberal
31st	1979–1980	Louis Duclos	Liberal
32nd	1980–1984	Louis Duclos	Liberal
Montmorency—Orléans
33rd	1984–1988	Anne Blouin	Progressive Conservative
34th	1988–1993	Charles Deblois	Progressive Conservative
Beauport—Montmorency—Orléans
35th	1993–1997	Michel Guimond	Bloc Québécois
36th	1997–2000	Michel Guimond	Bloc Québécois
Beauport—Montmorency—Côte-de-Beaupré—Île-d'Orléans
37th	2000–2004	Michel Guimond	Bloc Québécois
Riding dissolved into Beauport and Charlevoix—Montmorency

== Election results ==
=== Montmorency (1867–1917) ===
1867 Canadian federal election
Party	Candidate	Votes
Conservative	Joseph-Édouard Cauchon	acclaimed
Source: Canadian Elections Database

By-election: On Mr. Cauchon being called to the Senate, 2 November 1867

By-election on 11 December 1867
Party	Candidate	Votes
Conservative	Jean Langlois	766
Unknown	M. LeFrançois	3

1872 Canadian federal election
Party	Candidate	Votes
Conservative	Jean Langlois	769
Unknown	George Larue	327
Source: Canadian Elections Database

1874 Canadian federal election
Party	Candidate	Votes
Conservative	Jean Langlois	acclaimed
Source: lop.parl.ca

1878 Canadian federal election
Party	Candidate	Votes
Conservative	Pierre-Vincent Valin	831
Unknown	Jean Langlois	605

By-election: On Mr. Valin being unseated on petition, 14 January 1880

By-election on 14 February 1880
Party	Candidate	Votes
Conservative	Auguste-Réal Angers	943
Unknown	Saint-Georges	586

By-election: On Mr. Angers being appointed Puisne Judge, Superior Court of Quebec, 13 November 1880

By-election on 9 December 1880
Party	Candidate	Votes
Conservative	Pierre-Vincent Valin	846
Unknown	A. Cloutier	290

1882 Canadian federal election
Party	Candidate	Votes
Conservative	Pierre-Vincent Valin	810
Liberal	Charles Langelier	717

1887 Canadian federal election
Party	Candidate	Votes
Liberal	Charles Langelier	939
Conservative	Pierre-Vincent Valin	938

By-election: On Mr. Langelier's resignation, 10 June 1890

By-election on 25 July 1890
Party	Candidate	Votes
Conservative	Louis-Georges Desjardins	acclaimed

1891 Canadian federal election
Party	Candidate	Votes
Conservative	Joseph-Israël Tarte	975
Conservative	Arthur Joseph Turcotte	868
Conservative	P. V. Valin	92

By-election: On election being declared void

By-election on 10 March 1892
Party	Candidate	Votes
Conservative	Arthur Joseph Turcotte	acclaimed

1896 Canadian federal election
Party	Candidate	Votes
Conservative	Thomas Chase-Casgrain	1,096
Liberal	C. Langelier	1,046

1900 Canadian federal election
Party	Candidate	Votes
Conservative	Thomas Chase-Casgrain	1,109
Liberal	Philias Corriveau	1,056

1904 Canadian federal election
Party	Candidate	Votes
Liberal	Georges Parent	1,292
Conservative	Thomas Chase-Casgrain	1,035

1908 Canadian federal election
Party	Candidate	Votes
Liberal	Georges Parent	1,388
Conservative	Antoine Gobeil	1,073

1911 Canadian federal election
Party	Candidate	Votes
Conservative	Rodolphe Forget	1,359
Liberal	Georges Parent	1,292

=== Montmorency (1966–1980) ===
1968 Canadian federal election
Party	Candidate	Votes
Liberal	Ovide Laflamme	17,327
Ralliement créditiste	Jean-Marie McNicoll	16,114
Progressive Conservative	Roland Lortie	6,555
New Democratic	Lucille Morin	775
Independent	Paul-Henri Dufresne	649

1972 Canadian federal election
Party	Candidate	Votes
Liberal	Ovide Laflamme	24,250
Social Credit	René Lindsay	15,126
Progressive Conservative	Bernard Lapointe	5,904
Independent	Raymond Lavoie	4,845
New Democratic	Étienne Tremblay	2,215

1974 Canadian federal election
Party	Candidate	Votes
Liberal	Louis Duclos	27,082
Progressive Conservative	Henri Casault	11,867
Social Credit	André Duclos	8,905
New Democratic	Étienne Tremblay	3,570
Independent	Lucienne Paquet	369
Marxist–Leninist	Serge Tremblay	253

1979 Canadian federal election
Party	Candidate	Votes	%	±%
Liberal	Louis Duclos	26,870	63.59	
Social Credit	Conrad Ouellet	8,467	20.04	
Progressive Conservative	Carol St-Pierre	4,506	10.66	
New Democratic	Diane Lemieux	1,859	4.40	
Marxist–Leninist	Jean Bédard	326	0.77	
Union populaire	J.L. Lucien Gauvin	226	0.53	
Total valid votes		42,254	100.00	
Total rejected ballots		580		
Turnout		42,834	76.13	
Electors on the lists		56,261		

1980 Canadian federal election
Party	Candidate	Votes	%
Liberal	Louis Duclos	28,403	70.11
Progressive Conservative	Georges Labrecque	4,359	10.76
New Democratic	Marcel Tremblay	3,049	7.53
Rhinoceros	Face-Blême Jacques Thériault	1,913	4.72
Social Credit	Winifred Boulay	1,744	4.31
Independent	Carol St-Pierre	578	1.43
Union populaire	Isabelle Giroux	322	0.79
Marxist–Leninist	Jean Bédard	142	0.35
Total valid votes		40,510	100.00
Total rejected ballots		491	
Turnout		41,001	71.25
Electors on the lists		57,548	
lop.parl.ca

=== Montmorency—Orléans (1981–1990) ===
1984 Canadian federal election
Party	Candidate	Votes
Progressive Conservative	Anne Blouin	22,753
Liberal	Louis Duclos	19,226
New Democratic	Jacques Bérubé	3,931
Rhinoceros	Jean-Claude Pon Pon Demers	1,599
Parti nationaliste	Jules Gagnon	586
Social Credit	Winifred Raiche-Boulay	288

1988 Canadian federal election
Party	Candidate	Votes
Progressive Conservative	Charles Deblois	30,578
Liberal	Robert Paquet	11,578
New Democratic	Éric Gourdeau	7,700
Not affiliated	Jean Bédard	670

=== Beauport—Montmorency—Orléans (1990–1998) ===
1993 Canadian federal election
Party	Candidate	Votes
Bloc Québécois	Michel Guimond	31,671
Progressive Conservative	Charles Deblois	12,687
Liberal	Doris Dawson-Bernard	7,899
New Democratic	Suzanne Fortin	1,174
Natural Law	Gilles Rochette	1,138
Abolitionist	Micheline Loignon	294

1997 Canadian federal election
Party	Candidate	Votes
Bloc Québécois	Michel Guimond	21,994
Liberal	Simone Gosselin	13,863
Progressive Conservative	Michel Cliche	12,748
Reform	Yves Baribeau	1,255
New Democratic	Jessica Greenberg	885
Marxist–Leninist	Jean Bédard	419

=== Beauport—Montmorency—Côte-de-Beaupré—Île-d'Orléans (1998–2003) ===
2000 Canadian federal election
Party	Candidate	Votes
Bloc Québécois	Michel Guimond	21,341
Liberal	Chantal Plante	18,714
Alliance	Robert Giroux	5,878
Progressive Conservative	Lise Bernier	2,916
Marijuana	Mathieu Giroux	1,364
New Democratic	Eric Hébert	869
Marxist–Leninist	Jean Bédard	283

== See also ==
- List of Canadian electoral districts
- Historical federal electoral districts of Canada
