= Henri-Raymond Casgrain =

French Canadian Roman Catholic priest, author, publisher and professor

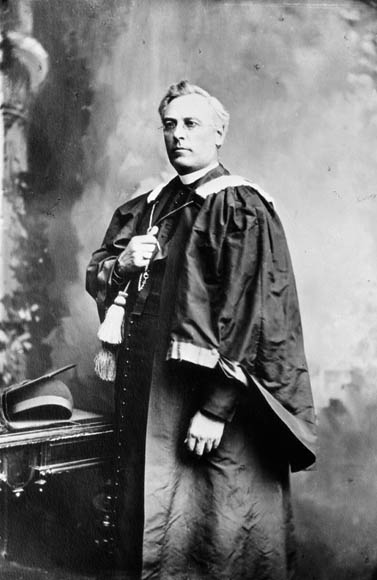
- Born: December 16, 1831; Rivière-Ouelle, Lower Canada
- Died: February 11, 1904 (aged 72); Quebec City, Quebec
- Title: President of the Royal Society of Canada
- Term: 1889–1890
- Predecessor: Sandford Fleming
- Successor: George Monro Grant
- Relatives: Charles-Eusèbe Casgrain, father

Henri-Raymond Casgrain (December 16, 1831 – February 11, 1904) was a French Canadian Roman Catholic priest, author, publisher, and professor of history.

== Life ==
Born in Rivière-Ouelle, Lower Canada, the son Charles-Eusèbe Casgrain and Eliza Anne Baby, Casgrain studied at College of Sainte-Anne-de-la-Pocatière. In 1852, he enrolled in the Montreal School of Medicine and Surgery, but became a priest in 1856. He started teaching at the College of Sainte-Anne-de-la-Pocatière until he was forced to give up teaching because of ill health. In 1859, he was appointed curate of the parish of La Nativité-de-Notre-Dame at Beauport and was free to devote himself entirely to literary pursuits.

In 1877, he was awarded a doctorate of history from the Universite Laval, where he would remain as professor.

He wrote primarily on New France and its personalities, such as Samuel de Champlain, Louis-Joseph de Montcalm and his aide-de-camp Francis de Gaston, Chevalier de Levis.

From 1889 to 1890, he was the president of the Royal Society of Canada.

== Selected bibliography ==
- Pélerinage au pays d'Évangéline (1855)
- Histoire de la Mère Marie de l'Incarnation (1864)
- Découverte du tombeau de Champlain (1866) with Laverdiere
- Histoire de l'Hôtel-Dieu de Québec (1878)
- Une paroisse canadienne au XVIIe siècle (1880)
- Histoire de l'asile du Bon-Pasteur de Québec (1890)
- Guerre du Canada: Montcalm et Lévis (1891, v.1)
- Guerre du Canada: Montcalm et Lévis (1891, v.2)
- Les français au Canada: Montcalm et Lévis
- Une seconde Acadie (1894)
- Les Sulpiciens et les prêtres des Missions étrangères en Acadie(1897)
- Éclaircissements sur la question acadienne
- Champlain : sa vie et son caractère (1898)

== See also ==
- Francis Parkman
- Montcalm and Wolfe

Professional and academic associations
Preceded by Sandford Fleming	President of the Royal Society of Canada; 1889–1890	Succeeded by George Monro Grant
