= Jean Langlois =

Canadian politician (1824–1886)

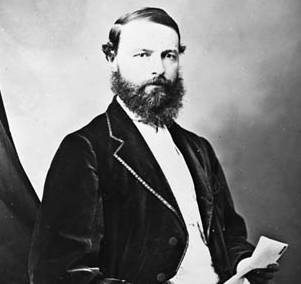
Jean Langlois

Jean Langlois QC (French pronunciation: [ʒɑ̃ lɑ̃ɡlwa]; February 16, 1824 – March 8, 1886) was a Quebec lawyer, professor and political figure. He represented Montmorency in the House of Commons of Canada as a Conservative member from 1867 to 1878.

He was born in Saint-Laurent on the Île d'Orléans in 1824, the son of Jean Langlois and Marie Labrecque, and studied at the Séminaire de Québec. He was called to the bar in 1847 and became a Queen's Counsel in 1867. Langlois was partner in a law firm in Quebec City with Louis-Napoléon Casault. He was professor of criminal law at Université Laval from 1858 to 1867. He was elected to the House of Commons in an 1867 by-election after Joseph-Édouard Cauchon was named to the Senate.

In 1870, Langlois married Mary Josephine Macdonald. He died in Quebec City at the age of 62.
