= Philippe Baby Casgrain =

Canadian politician

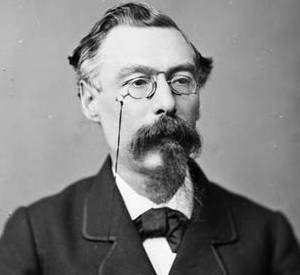

Member of the Canadian Parliament for L'Islet
- In office 1872–1891
- Preceded by: Barthélemy Pouliot
- Succeeded by: Louis-Georges Desjardins

Personal details
- Born: 30 December 1826 Quebec City, Lower Canada
- Died: 23 May 1917 (aged 90)
- Party: Liberal
- Relations: Charles-Eusèbe Casgrain, father Thomas Chase-Casgrain, nephew Louis Beaubien, cousin Luc Letellier de St-Just, cousin
- Children: Joseph Philippe Baby Casgrain

Philippe Baby Casgrain (30 December 1826 – 23 May 1917) was a Quebec lawyer, author and political figure. He represented L'Islet in the House of Commons of Canada as a Liberal member from 1873 to 1891.

He was born in Quebec City in 1826, the son of Charles-Eusèbe Casgrain, and studied at the College of Ste. Anne de la Pocatière. He articled in law with Jean-Thomas Taschereau, was called to the bar in 1850 and practiced at Quebec with Pierre Joseph Olivier Chauveau. In 1854, he married Mathilde Perrault. He was named deputy prothonotary for the Quebec Superior Court in Quebec district. Casgrain was named Queen's Counsel in 1879. After he retired from politics, he was clerk for the Quebec Circuit and Revision Court. He served several terms as president of the Literary and Historical Society of Quebec.

Casgrain published a number of works on the history of Canada, including:

- Letellier de Saint-Just et son temps (1895)
- La vie de Joseph-François Perrault, surnommé le père de l'éducation du peuple canadien (1898)
- La fontaine d'Abraham Martin et le site de son habitation (1903)
- La maison d'Arnoux où Montcalm est mort (1903)
- La maison du Chien d'Or à Québec (1905)
- Les batailles des plaines d'Abraham et de Sainte-Foye (1908)
- La chapelle et le tombeau de Champlain (1909)

He died at Quebec in 1917.

His son Joseph Philippe Baby became a member of the Canadian Senate.

== Electoral record ==
1872 Canadian federal election: L'Islet
Party	Candidate	Votes
Liberal	Philippe Baby Casgrain	646
Conservative	Barthélemy Pouliot	599
Source: Canadian Elections Database

1874 Canadian federal election: L'Islet
Party	Candidate	Votes
Liberal	Philippe Baby Casgrain	acclaimed
Source: lop.parl.ca

1878 Canadian federal election: L'Islet
Party	Candidate	Votes
Liberal	Philippe Baby Casgrain	687
Unknown	Fournier	628

1882 Canadian federal election: L'Islet
Party	Candidate	Votes
Liberal	Philippe Baby Casgrain	545
Unknown	N. J. J. B. Chouinard	480
Unknown	Jos. Dufour	244

1887 Canadian federal election: L'Islet
Party	Candidate	Votes
Liberal	Philippe Baby Casgrain	883
Unknown	P. R. A. Bélanger	843

1891 Canadian federal election: L'Islet
Party	Candidate	Votes
Conservative	Louis-Georges Desjardins	981
Liberal	Philippe Baby Casgrain	975
