= Thomas Chase-Casgrain =

Canadian politician (1852–1916)

The Honourable Thomas Chase-Casgrain PC
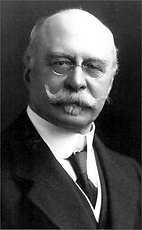

Member of the Canadian Parliament for Montmorency
- In office 23 June 1896 – 2 November 1904
- Preceded by: Arthur Joseph Turcotte
- Succeeded by: Georges Parent

Member of the Canadian Parliament for Quebec County
- In office 7 November 1914 – 29 December 1916
- Preceded by: Louis-Philippe Pelletier
- Succeeded by: Henri-Edgar Lavigueur

Personal details
- Born: 28 July 1852 Detroit
- Died: 29 December 1916 (aged 64) Ottawa
- Party: Conservative
- Relations: Charles Eusèbe Casgrain, father
- Education: Université Laval
- Occupation: politician, lawyer, professor

Thomas Chase-Casgrain, PC (28 July 1852 – 29 December 1916), also known as Thomas Casgrain, was a French-Canadian lawyer and politician. As a young attorney he became famous for his participation in the prosecution of Louis Riel.

He was born at Detroit in 1852, the son of Charles Eusèbe Casgrain, and studied at the Petit Séminaire de Québec and the Université Laval. He was admitted to the Quebec Bar in 1877 and received the Dufferin Silver Medal in the same year. He was named professor of law at Université Laval two years later.

In 1885, he was named to the legal team representing the Crown in the trial of Louis Riel. Although the crown was represented by a large team including George Burbidge, Christopher Robinson, Britton Bath Osler and others, Casgrain was the only French-Canadian in the group. Pro-Riel sentiment in the province of Quebec was so strong that he was burned in effigy during at least one demonstration.

However, this did not prevent him from being elected in the Legislative Assembly of Quebec. He was elected for Quebec County in 1886 and for Montmorency in 1892. He was attorney general in the provincial cabinet from December 1891 to November 1892 and again from December 1892 to May 1896. He represented Montmorency as a Conservative Member of Parliament in the House of Commons of Canada from 1896 to 1904 and Quebec County from 1914 until his death from pneumonia at Ottawa in 1916. He was entombed at the Notre Dame des Neiges Cemetery in Montreal. He served as Postmaster General from October 1914 until his death.

== Electoral record ==
By-election on 7 November 1914
Party	Candidate	Votes
Conservative	Thomas Chase-Casgrain	acclaimed

1896 Canadian federal election: Montmorency
Party	Candidate	Votes
Conservative	Thomas Chase-Casgrain	1,096
Liberal	C. Langelier	1,046

1900 Canadian federal election: Montmorency
Party	Candidate	Votes
Conservative	Thomas Chase-Casgrain	1,109
Liberal	Philias Corriveau	1,056

1904 Canadian federal election: Montmorency
Party	Candidate	Votes
Liberal	Georges Parent	1,292
Conservative	Thomas Chase-Casgrain	1,035

Parliament of Canada
Preceded by Arthur Joseph Turcotte	Member of Parliament from Montmorency; 1896–1904	Succeeded by Georges Parent
Preceded by Louis-Philippe Pelletier	Member of Parliament from Quebec County; 1914–1916	Succeeded by Henri-Edgar Lavigueur
