= Joseph Philippe Baby Casgrain =

Canadian politician

The Hon. Joseph Philippe Baby Casgrain
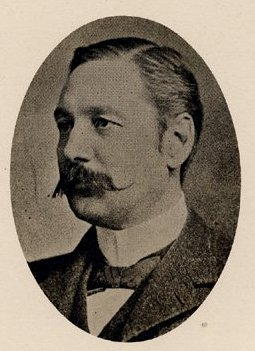

Senator for De Lanaudière, Quebec
- In office 1900–1939
- Appointed by: Wilfrid Laurier
- Preceded by: Joseph-Hyacinthe Bellerose
- Succeeded by: Édouard-Charles St-Père

Personal details
- Born: March 1, 1856 Quebec City, Canada East
- Died: January 6, 1939 (aged 82)
- Party: Liberal
- Relations: Philippe Baby Casgrain, father

Joseph Philippe Baby Casgrain (March 1, 1856 – January 6, 1939) was a Quebec surveyor, civil engineer and political figure. He was a Liberal member of the Senate of Canada for De Lanaudière division from 1900 to 1939.

He was born at Quebec City in 1856, the son of Philippe Baby Casgrain, and studied at the Séminaire de Québec. He qualified to practice as a provincial land surveyor in Quebec in 1878 and as a dominion land surveyor for Canada in 1881; he also later qualified as a surveyor for Ontario and Manitoba. He later became chief engineer for the Montreal and Pacific Junction Railway, also serving as a director for the company. Casgrain was also chief engineer for the Montreal Turnpike Trust. He was president of the Montreal Herald. In 1885, he married Ella, the daughter of lumber merchant James William Cook. They lived at 'Bijou', their home in the Golden Square Mile of Montreal.

He died in office in 1939.
