= List of members of the Canadian House of Commons (L) =

== L' ==
- David Ovide L'Espérance b. 1864 first elected in 1911 as Conservative member for Montmagny, Quebec.
- Yvon L'Heureux b. 1914 first elected in 1957 as Liberal member for Chambly—Rouville, Quebec.

== La–Lak ==
- Roch La Salle b. 1929 first elected in 1968 as Progressive Conservative member for Joliette, Quebec.
- Jean-Baptiste Labelle b. 1836 first elected in 1887 as Conservative member for Richelieu, Quebec.
- Simon Labrosse b. 1836 first elected in 1882 as Liberal member for Prescott, Ontario.
- Élie Lacerte b. 1821 first elected in 1868 as Conservative member for Saint Maurice, Quebec.
- Arthur Lachance b. 1868 first elected in 1905 as Liberal member for Quebec-Centre, Quebec.
- Claude-André Lachance b. 1954 first elected in 1974 as Liberal member for Lafontaine, Quebec.
- Georges-C. Lachance b. 1926 first elected in 1962 as Liberal member for Lafontaine, Quebec.
- Sévérin Lachapelle b. 1851 first elected in 1892 as Conservative member for Hochelaga, Quebec.
- Liguori Lacombe b. 1895 first elected in 1925 as Liberal member for Laval—Two Mountains, Quebec.
- Édouard Lacroix b. 1889 first elected in 1925 as Liberal member for Beauce, Quebec.
- Wilfrid Lacroix b. 1891 first elected in 1935 as Liberal member for Québec—Montmorency, Quebec.
- Leon Johnson Ladner b. 1884 first elected in 1921 as Conservative member for Vancouver South, British Columbia.
- Fernand Ladouceur b. 1925 first elected in 1984 as Progressive Conservative member for Labelle, Quebec.
- Leo Kemner Laflamme b. 1893 first elected in 1925 as Liberal member for Montmagny, Quebec.
- Napoléon Kemner Laflamme b. 1865 first elected in 1921 as Liberal member for Drummond—Arthabaska, Quebec.
- Ovide Laflamme b. 1925 first elected in 1955 as Liberal member for Bellechasse, Quebec.
- Rodolphe Laflamme b. 1827 first elected in 1872 as Liberal member for Jacques Cartier, Quebec.
- François-Joseph Laflèche b. 1879 first elected in 1930 as Conservative member for Richmond—Wolfe, Quebec.
- Léo Richer Laflèche b. 1888 first elected in 1942 as Liberal member for Outremont, Quebec.
- Joseph Lafontaine b. 1885 first elected in 1940 as Liberal member for Mégantic—Frontenac, Quebec.
- Jean-Yves Laforest b. 1949 first elected in 2006 as a Bloc Québécois member for Saint-Maurice—Champlain, Quebec.
- David Arthur Lafortune b. 1848 first elected in 1909 as Independent Liberal member for Montcalm, Quebec.
- Mario Laframboise b. 1957 first elected in 2000 as Bloc Québécois member for Argenteuil—Papineau—Mirabel, Quebec.
- Robert B. Lafrenière b. 1924 first elected in 1958 as Progressive Conservative member for Québec—Montmorency, Quebec.
- Paul Lahaye b. 1902 first elected in 1958 as Progressive Conservative member for Champlain, Quebec.
- Arthur Laing b. 1904 first elected in 1949 as Liberal member for Vancouver South, British Columbia.
- David Laird b. 1833 first elected in 1873 as Liberal member for Queen's County, Prince Edward Island.
- Charles Gérin Lajoie b. 1824 first elected in 1874 as Liberal member for Saint Maurice, Quebec.
- Claude G. Lajoie b. 1928 first elected in 1971 as Liberal member for Trois-Rivières, Quebec.
- Mike Lake b. 1969 first elected in 2006 as Conservative member for Edmonton—Mill Woods—Beaumont, Alberta.
- Richard Stuart Lake b. 1860 first elected in 1904 as Conservative member for Qu'Appelle, Northwest Territories.

== Lal–Lam ==
- Rick Laliberte b. 1958 first elected in 1997 as New Democratic Party member for Churchill River, Saskatchewan.
- Francine Lalonde b. 1940 first elected in 1993 as Bloc Québécois member for Mercier, Quebec.
- Marc Lalonde b. 1929 first elected in 1972 as Liberal member for Outremont, Quebec.
- Marie-France Lalonde b. 1971 first elected in 2019 as Liberal member for Orléans, Ontario.
- Maurice Lalonde b. 1901 first elected in 1935 as Liberal member for Labelle, Quebec.
- Francis Ramsey Lalor b. 1856 first elected in 1904 as Conservative member for Haldimand, Ontario.
- Paul-Émile Lamarche b. 1881 first elected in 1911 as Conservative member for Nicolet, Quebec.
- Judy LaMarsh b. 1924 first elected in 1960 as Liberal member for Niagara Falls, Ontario.
- Charles Wesley Lamb b. 1891 first elected in 1963 as Progressive Conservative member for Victoria, Ontario.
- Joseph Adrien Henri Lambert b. 1913 first elected in 1968 as Ralliement Créditiste member for Bellechasse, Quebec.
- Marcel Joseph Aimé Lambert b. 1919 first elected in 1957 as Progressive Conservative member for Edmonton West, Alberta.
- Emmanuella Lambropoulos b. 1990 first elected in 2017 as Liberal member for Saint-Laurent, Quebec.
- David Lametti b. 1962 first elected in 2015 as Liberal member for LaSalle—Émard—Verdun, Quebec.
- Kevin Lamoureux b. 1962 first elected in 2020 as Liberal member for Winnipeg North, Manitoba.
- John Henderson Lamont b. 1865 first elected in 1904 as Liberal member for Provisional District of Saskatchewan, Northwest Territories.
- J. Gilles Lamontagne b. 1919 first elected in 1977 as Liberal member for Langelier, Quebec.
- Maurice Lamontagne b. 1917 first elected in 1963 as Liberal member for Outremont—St-Jean, Quebec.
- Lucien Lamoureux b. 1920 first elected in 1962 as Liberal member for Stormont, Ontario.
- Gérard Lamy b. 1919 first elected in 1962 as Social Credit member for Saint-Maurice—Laflèche, Quebec.

== Lanc–Lane ==
- Edward Arthur Lancaster b. 1860 first elected in 1900 as Conservative member for Lincoln and Niagara, Ontario.
- Adélard Lanctôt b. 1874 first elected in 1907 as Liberal member for Richelieu, Quebec.
- Robert Lanctôt b. 1963 first elected in 2000 as Bloc Québécois member for Châteauguay, Quebec.
- Roch Lanctôt b. 1866 first elected in 1904 as Liberal member for Laprairie—Napierville, Quebec.
- George Landerkin b. 1839 first elected in 1872 as Liberal member for Grey South, Ontario.
- Mike Landers b. 1943 first elected in 1974 as Liberal member for Saint John—Lancaster, New Brunswick.
- John Landeryou b. 1905 first elected in 1935 as Social Credit member for Calgary East, Alberta.
- Auguste Charles Philippe Robert Landry b. 1846 first elected in 1878 as Conservative member for Montmagny, Quebec.
- Jean Landry b. 1948 first elected in 1993 as Bloc Québécois member for Lotbinière, Quebec.
- Joseph-Armand Landry b. 1918 first elected in 1957 as Liberal member for Dorchester, Quebec.
- Monique Landry b. 1937 first elected in 1984 as Progressive Conservative member for Blainville—Deux-Montagnes, Quebec.
- Pierre Amand Landry b. 1846 first elected in 1883 as Conservative member for Kent, New Brunswick.
- Robert Lane b. 1933 first elected in 1979 as Progressive Conservative member for Winnipeg—St. James, Manitoba.
- Samuel Johnathan Lane b. 1830 first elected in 1878 as Liberal-Conservative member for Grey North, Ontario.

== Lang–Lant ==
- John Lang b. 1839 first elected in 1887 as Independent Liberal member for Peterborough East, Ontario.
- Malcolm Lang b. 1875 first elected in 1926 as Labour Party member for Timiskaming South, Ontario.
- Norman Lang b. 1879 first elected in 1917 as Unionist member for Humboldt, Saskatchewan.
- Otto Lang b. 1932 first elected in 1968 as Liberal member for Saskatoon—Humboldt, Saskatchewan.
- Peter Joseph Lang b. 1950 first elected in 1980 as Liberal member for Kitchener, Ontario.
- Joy Langan b. 1943 first elected in 1988 as New Democratic Party member for Mission—Coquitlam, British Columbia.
- Steven W. Langdon b. 1946 first elected in 1984 as New Democratic Party member for Essex—Windsor, Ontario.
- Charles Langelier b. 1850 first elected in 1887 as Liberal member for Montmorency, Quebec.
- François Charles Stanislas Langelier b. 1838 first elected in 1884 as Liberal member for Mégantic, Quebec.
- Hector-Louis Langevin b. 1826 first elected in 1867 as Conservative member for Dorchester, Quebec.
- Aimé Langlois b. 1880 first elected in 1925 as Liberal member for Chambly—Verchères, Quebec.
- Charles A. Langlois b. 1938 first elected in 1988 as Progressive Conservative member for Manicouagan, Quebec.
- François Langlois b. 1948 first elected in 1993 as Bloc Québécois member for Bellechasse, Quebec.
- J. G. Léopold Langlois b. 1913 first elected in 1945 as Liberal member for Gaspé, Quebec.
- Jean Langlois b. 1824 first elected in 1867 as Conservative member for Montmorency, Quebec.
- Joseph Langlois b. 1909 first elected in 1949 as Liberal member for Berthier—Maskinongé, Quebec.
- Paul Langlois b. 1926 first elected in 1965 as Liberal member for Chicoutimi, Quebec.
- Raymond Langlois b. 1936 first elected in 1962 as Social Credit member for Mégantic, Quebec.
- William Fitzgerald Langworthy b. 1867 first elected in 1925 as Conservative member for Port Arthur—Thunder Bay, Ontario.
- Gérald Laniel b. 1924 first elected in 1962 as Liberal member for Beauharnois—Salaberry, Quebec.
- Claude Lanthier b. 1933 first elected in 1984 as Progressive Conservative member for Lasalle, Quebec.
- Jacques Philippe Lantier b. 1814 first elected in 1872 as Conservative member for Soulanges, Quebec.
- Melissa Lantsman b. 1984 first elected in 2021 as Conservative member for Thornhill, Ontario.

== Lap–Lat ==
- Georges-Émile Lapalme b. 1907 first elected in 1945 as Liberal member for Joliette—l'Assomption—Montcalm, Quebec.
- Edmond Lapierre b. 1866 first elected in 1921 as Liberal member for Nipissing, Ontario.
- Jean Lapierre b. 1956 first elected in 1979 as Liberal member for Shefford, Quebec.
- Réal Lapierre b. 1944 first elected in 2004 as Bloc Québécois member for Lévis—Bellechasse, Quebec.
- Arthur-Joseph Lapointe b. 1895 first elected in 1935 as Liberal member for Matapédia—Matane, Quebec.
- Charles Lapointe b. 1944 first elected in 1974 as Liberal member for Charlevoix, Quebec.
- Ernest Lapointe b. 1876 first elected in 1904 as Liberal member for Kamouraska, Quebec.
- François Lapointe b. 1971 first elected in 2011 as New Democratic Party member for Montmagny—L'Islet—Kamouraska—Rivière-du-Loup, Quebec.
- Hugues Lapointe b. 1911 first elected in 1940 as Liberal member for Lotbinière, Quebec.
- Linda Lapointe b. 1960 first elected in 2015 as Liberal member for Rivière-des-Mille-Îles, Quebec.
- Louis Audet Lapointe b. 1860 first elected in 1911 as Liberal member for St. James, Quebec.
- Normand Lapointe b. 1939 first elected in 1980 as Liberal member for Beauce, Quebec.
- Viviane Lapointe first elected in 2021 as Liberal member for Sudbury, Ontario.
- Rodney Edward Laporte b. 1953 first elected in 1988 as New Democratic Party member for Moose Jaw—Lake Centre, Saskatchewan.
- Gérard Laprise b. 1925 first elected in 1962 as Social Credit member for Chapleau, Quebec.
- James Lapum b. 1819 first elected in 1867 as Conservative member for Addington, Ontario.
- J. James Larabee b. 1885 first elected in 1935 as Liberal member for Queen's, Prince Edward Island.
- Alphonse Alfred Clément Larivière b. 1842 first elected in 1889 as Conservative member for Provencher, Manitoba.
- Jean-François Larose b. 1972 first elected in 2011 as New Democratic Party member for Repentigny, Quebec.
- Andréanne Larouche first elected in 2019 as Bloc Québécois member for Shefford, Quebec.
- Gaby Larrivée b. 1933 first elected in 1988 as Progressive Conservative member for Joliette, Quebec.
- Frederick Hugo Larson b. 1913 first elected in 1949 as Liberal member for Kindersley, Saskatchewan.
- Achille Larue b. 1849 first elected in 1878 as Liberal member for Bellechasse, Quebec.
- Joseph-Ernest-Henri Larue b. 1892 first elected in 1930 as Conservative member for Matane, Quebec.
- Perrault LaRue b. 1925 first elected in 1958 as Progressive Conservative member for Saguenay, Quebec.
- Walt Lastewka b. 1940 first elected in 1993 as Liberal member for St. Catharines, Ontario.
- Alexandrine Latendresse b. 1984 first elected in 2011 as New Democratic Party member for Louis-Saint-Laurent, Quebec.
- Joseph-Octave Latour b. 1906 first elected in 1958 as Progressive Conservative member for Argenteuil—Deux-Montagnes, Quebec.
- Patricia Lattanzio first elected in 2019 as Liberal member for Saint-Léonard—Saint-Michel, Quebec.
- Henry Latulippe b. 1913 first elected in 1962 as Social Credit member for Compton—Frontenac, Quebec.

== Lau–Lay ==
- Frederick Andrew Laurence b. 1843 first elected in 1904 as Liberal member for Colchester, Nova Scotia.
- Aldéric Laurendeau b. 1890 first elected in 1945 as Liberal member for Berthier—Maskinongé, Quebec.
- John Wimburne Laurie b. 1835 first elected in 1887 as Conservative member for Shelburne, Nova Scotia.
- Romuald-Charlemagne Laurier b. 1852 first elected in 1900 as Liberal member for L'Assomption, Quebec.
- Ruben Charles Laurier b. 1868 first elected in 1907 as Liberal member for L'Assomption, Quebec.
- Wilfrid Laurier b. 1841 first elected in 1874 as Liberal member for Drummond—Arthabaska, Quebec.
- Joseph-Georges-Philippe Laurin b. 1892 first elected in 1930 as Conservative member for Jacques Cartier, Quebec.
- René Laurin b. 1940 first elected in 1993 as Bloc Québécois member for Joliette, Quebec.
- Guy Lauzon b. 1944 first elected in 2004 as Conservative member for Stormont—Dundas—South Glengarry, Ontario.
- Stéphane Lauzon b. 1966 first elected in 2015 as Liberal member for Argenteuil—La Petite-Nation, Quebec.
- Ginette Lavack first elected in 2025 as Liberal member for St. Boniface—St. Vital, Manitoba.
- Carole Lavallée b. 1954 first elected in 2004 as Bloc Québécois member for Saint-Bruno—Saint-Hubert, Quebec.
- Joseph Octave Lavallée b. 1878 first elected in 1911 as Conservative member for Bellechasse, Quebec.
- John Reeve Lavell b. 1857 first elected in 1900 as Conservative member for Leeds North and Grenville North, Ontario.
- Hélène Laverdière b. 1955 first elected in 2011 as New Democratic Party member for Laurier—Sainte-Marie, Quebec.
- Herman E. Laverdière b. 1927 first elected in 1963 as Liberal member for Bellechasse, Quebec.
- Armand Renaud Lavergne b. 1880 first elected in 1904 as Liberal member for Montmagny, Quebec.
- Joseph Lavergne b. 1847 first elected in 1887 as Liberal member for Drummond—Arthabaska, Quebec.
- Louis Lavergne b. 1845 first elected in 1897 as Liberal member for Drummond—Arthabaska, Quebec.
- Albert Peter Lavigne b. 1908 first elected in 1954 as Liberal member for Stormont, Ontario.
- Laurent Lavigne b. 1935 first elected in 1993 as Bloc Québécois member for Beauharnois—Salaberry, Quebec.
- Raymond Lavigne b. 1945 first elected in 1993 as Liberal member for Verdun—Saint-Paul, Quebec.
- Henri-Edgar Lavigueur b. 1867 first elected in 1917 as Laurier Liberal member for Quebec County, Quebec.
- Jacques Lavoie b. 1936 first elected in 1975 as Progressive Conservative member for Hochelaga, Quebec.
- Steeve Lavoie b. 1975 first elected in 2025 as Liberal member for Beauport—Limoilou, Quebec.
- Bowman Brown Law b. 1855 first elected in 1902 as Liberal member for Yarmouth, Nova Scotia.
- Allan Frederick Lawrence b. 1925 first elected in 1972 as Progressive Conservative member for Northumberland—Durham, Ontario.
- Philip Lawrence first elected in 2019 as Conservative member for Northumberland—Peterborough South, Ontario.
- Earl Lawson b. 1891 first elected in 1928 as Conservative member for York West, Ontario.
- Peter Lawson b. 1821 first elected in 1867 as Liberal member for Norfolk South, Ontario.
- Andrew Lawton first elected in 2025 as Conservative member for Elgin—St. Thomas—London South, Ontario.
- Jack Layton b. 1950 first elected in 2004 as New Democratic Party member for Toronto—Danforth, Ontario.
- Robert E.J. Layton b. 1925 first elected in 1984 as Progressive Conservative member for Lachine, Quebec.

== Le–Lee ==
- Isaac Le Vesconte b. 1822 first elected in 1869 as Conservative member for Richmond, Nova Scotia.
- Harry Leader b. 1880 first elected in 1921 as Progressive member for Portage la Prairie, Manitoba.
- Denis Lebel b. 1954 first elected in 2007 as Conservative member for Roberval—Lac-Saint-Jean, Quebec.
- Ghislain Lebel b. 1946 first elected in 1993 as Bloc Québécois member for Chambly, Quebec.
- Dominic LeBlanc b. 1967 first elected in 2000 as Liberal member for Beauséjour—Petitcodiac, New Brunswick.
- Fernand-E. Leblanc b. 1917 first elected in 1964 as Liberal member for Laurier, Quebec.
- Francis G. Leblanc b. 1953 first elected in 1988 as Liberal member for Cape Breton Highlands—Canso, Nova Scotia.
- Hélène LeBlanc b. 1958 first elected in 2011 as New Democratic Party member for LaSalle—Émard, Quebec.
- Louis Guy Leblanc b. 1921 first elected in 1965 as Liberal member for Rimouski, Quebec.
- Nic Leblanc b. 1941 first elected in 1984 as Progressive Conservative member for Longueuil, Quebec.
- Olivier J. Leblanc b. 1830 first elected in 1900 as Liberal member for Kent, New Brunswick.
- Roméo LeBlanc b. 1927 first elected in 1972 as Liberal member for Westmorland—Kent, New Brunswick.
- Bert Leboe b. 1909 first elected in 1953 as Social Credit member for Cariboo, British Columbia.
- Diane Lebouthillier b. 1959 first elected in 2015 as Liberal member for Gaspésie—Les Îles-de-la-Madeleine, Quebec.
- Pierre-Julien Leclair b. 1860 first elected in 1893 as Conservative member for Terrebonne, Quebec.
- Joseph-Hermas Leclerc b. 1877 first elected in 1935 as Liberal member for Shefford, Quebec.
- Edgar Leduc b. 1888 first elected in 1949 as Independent member for Jacques Cartier, Quebec.
- Jean-Louis Leduc b. 1918 first elected in 1979 as Liberal member for Richelieu, Quebec.
- Joseph Alfred Leduc b. 1868 first elected in 1917 as Laurier Liberal member for Westmount—St. Henri, Quebec.
- Joseph Gérard Yves Leduc b. 1908 first elected in 1954 as Liberal member for Verdun, Quebec.
- Joseph Hector Leduc b. 1864 first elected in 1891 as Liberal member for Nicolet, Quebec.
- Rodolphe Leduc b. 1902 first elected in 1936 as Liberal member for Wright, Quebec.
- Arthur John Lee b. 1947 first elected in 1974 as Liberal member for Vancouver East, British Columbia.
- Derek Lee b. 1948 first elected in 1988 as Liberal member for Scarborough—Rouge River, Ontario.
- Ryan Leef b. 1973 first elected in 2011 as Conservative member for Yukon.

== Lef–Ler ==
- Éric Lefebvre first elected in 2025 as Conservative member for Richmond—Arthabaska, Quebec.
- Paul Lefebvre b. 1974 first elected in 2015 as Liberal member for Sudbury, Ontario.
- Réjean Lefebvre b. 1943 first elected in 1993 as Bloc Québécois member for Champlain, Quebec.
- Thomas Lefebvre b. 1927 first elected in 1965 as Liberal member for Pontiac—Témiscamingue, Quebec.
- J.-Eugène Lefrançois b. 1896 first elected in 1949 as Liberal member for Laurier, Quebec.
- Alfred Alexander Lefurgey b. 1871 first elected in 1900 as Conservative member for East Prince, Prince Edward Island.
- Gérard Légaré b. 1908 first elected in 1953 as Liberal member for Rimouski, Quebec.
- Carl Legault b. 1923 first elected in 1964 as Liberal member for Nipissing, Ontario.
- Auguste Théophile Léger b. 1852 first elected in 1917 as Laurier Liberal member for Kent, New Brunswick.
- Aurel D. Léger b. 1894 first elected in 1940 as Liberal member for Kent, New Brunswick.
- Édouard H. Léger b. 1866 first elected in 1890 as Conservative member for Kent, New Brunswick.
- Felton Fenwick Legere b. 1913 first elected in 1958 as Progressive Conservative member for Shelburne—Yarmouth—Clare, Nova Scotia.
- Stuart Malcolm Leggatt b. 1931 first elected in 1972 as New Democratic Party member for New Westminster, British Columbia.
- Joseph Hormidas Legris b. 1850 first elected in 1891 as Liberal member for Maskinongé, Quebec.
- Richard Lehoux b. 1956 first elected in 2019 as Conservative member for Beauce, Quebec.
- Carlos Leitão b. 1956 first elected in 2025 as Liberal member for Marc-Aurèle-Fortin, Quebec.
- Kellie Leitch b. 1970 first elected in 2011 as Conservative member for Simcoe—Grey, Ontario.
- Marc Lemay b. 1951 first elected in 2004 as Bloc Québécois member for Abitibi—Témiscamingue, Quebec.
- Denis Lemieux b. 1964 first elected in 2015 as Liberal member for Chicoutimi—Le Fjord, Quebec.
- Pierre Lemieux b. 1963 first elected in 2006 as Conservative member for Glengarry—Prescott—Russell, Ontario.
- Rodolphe Lemieux b. 1866 first elected in 1896 as Liberal member for Gaspé, Quebec.
- Sébastien Lemire first elected in 2019 as Bloc Québécois member for Abitibi—Témiscamingue, Quebec.
- Frank Exton Lennard b. 1892 first elected in 1935 as Conservative member for Wentworth, Ontario.
- Haughton Lennox b. 1850 first elected in 1900 as Conservative member for Simcoe South, Ontario.
- Thomas Herbert Lennox b. 1869 first elected in 1925 as Conservative member for York North, Ontario.
- Joseph-Édouard-Émile Léonard b. 1872 first elected in 1902 as Conservative member for Laval, Quebec.
- Alphonse Télesphore Lépine b. 1855 first elected in 1888 as Independent Conservative member for Montreal East, Quebec.
- Gaston Leroux b. 1948 first elected in 1993 as Bloc Québécois member for Richmond—Wolfe, Quebec.
- Jean H. Leroux b. 1949 first elected in 1993 as Bloc Québécois member for Shefford, Quebec.

== Les–Lew ==
- Charles Alexander Lesage b. 1843 first elected in 1882 as Conservative member for Dorchester, Quebec.
- Jean Lesage b. 1912 first elected in 1945 as Liberal member for Montmagny—l'Islet, Quebec.
- Joseph Edmond Lesage b. 1871 first elected in 1917 as Laurier Liberal member for Hochelaga, Quebec.
- William Lesick b. 1923 first elected in 1984 as Progressive Conservative member for Edmonton East, Alberta.
- Andrew Leslie b. 1957 first elected in 2015 as Liberal member for Orléans, Ontario.
- Branden Leslie first elected in 2023 as Conservative member for Portage—Lisgar, Manitoba.
- Megan Leslie b. 1973 first elected in 2008 as New Democratic member for Halifax, Nova Scotia.
- H.-Pit Lessard b. 1913 first elected in 1958 as Liberal member for Saint-Henri, Quebec.
- Marcel Lessard b. 1926 first elected in 1962 as Social Credit member for Lac-Saint-Jean, Quebec.
- Yves Lessard b. 1943 first elected in 2004 as Bloc Québécois member for Chambly—Borduas, Quebec.
- Richard Vryling Lesueur b. 1879 first elected in 1921 as Conservative member for Lambton West, Ontario.
- Joseph Étienne Letellier de Saint-Just b. 1880 first elected in 1925 as Liberal member for Compton, Quebec.
- René Joseph Eugène Létourneau b. 1912 first elected in 1958 as Progressive Conservative member for Stanstead, Quebec.
- Chungsen Leung b. 1950 first elected in 2011 as Conservative member for Willowdale, Ontario.
- Sophia Leung b. 1933 first elected in 1997 as Liberal member for Vancouver Kingsway, British Columbia.
- Yvon Lévesque b. 1940 first elected in 2004 as Bloc Québécois member for Nunavik—Eeyou, Quebec.
- Michael Levitt b. 1970 first elected in 2015 as Liberal member for York Centre, Ontario.
- Arthur John Lewis b. 1879 first elected in 1921 as Progressive member for Swift Current, Saskatchewan.
- Chris Lewis b. 1976 first elected in 2019 as Conservative member for Essex.
- David Lewis b. 1909 first elected in 1962 as New Democratic Party member for York South, Ontario.
- Doug Lewis b. 1938 first elected in 1979 as Progressive Conservative member for Simcoe North, Ontario.
- Edward Norman Lewis b. 1858 first elected in 1904 as Conservative member for Huron West, Ontario.
- John Bower Lewis b. 1815 first elected in 1872 as Conservative member for City of Ottawa, Ontario.
- Leslyn Lewis b. 1970 first elected in 2021 as Conservative member for Haldimand—Norfolk, Ontario.
- William James Lewis b. 1830 first elected in 1896 as Independent member for Albert, New Brunswick.
- Louis Harrington Lewry b. 1919 first elected in 1957 as Cooperative Commonwealth Federation member for Moose Jaw—Lake Centre, Saskatchewan.
- Laverne Lewycky b. 1946 first elected in 1980 as New Democratic Party member for Dauphin, Manitoba.

== Li ==
- Ron Liepert b. 1949 first elected in 2015 as Conservative member for Calgary Signal Hill, Alberta.
- Joël Lightbound b. 1988 first elected in 2015 as Liberal member for Louis-Hébert, Quebec.
- Wendy Lill b. 1950 first elected in 1997 as New Democratic Party member for Dartmouth, Nova Scotia.
- Rick Limoges b. 1956 first elected in 1999 as Liberal member for Windsor—St. Clair, Ontario.
- Clifford Lincoln b. 1928 first elected in 1993 as Liberal member for Lachine—Lac-Saint-Louis, Quebec.
- James Lind b. 1913 first elected in 1965 as Liberal member for Middlesex East, Ontario.
- Urbain Lippé b. 1831 first elected in 1891 as Conservative member for Joliette, Quebec.
- James Frederick Lister b. 1843 first elected in 1882 as Liberal member for Lambton West, Ontario.
- Walter Little b. 1877 first elected in 1935 as Liberal member for Timiskaming, Ontario.
- William Carruthers Little b. 1820 first elected in 1867 as Liberal-Conservative member for Simcoe South, Ontario.
- Willie Littlechild b. 1944 first elected in 1988 as Progressive Conservative member for Wetaskiwin, Alberta.
- Laurin Liu b. 1990 first elected in 2011 as New Democratic Party member for Rivière-des-Mille-Îles, Quebec.
- James Livingston b. 1838 first elected in 1882 as Liberal member for Waterloo South, Ontario.
- Wladyslaw Lizon b. 1954 first elected in 2011 as Conservative member for Mississauga East—Cooksville, Ontario.
- Louis Philippe Lizotte b. 1891 first elected in 1940 as Liberal member for Kamouraska, Quebec.

== Ll ==
- Dane Lloyd b. 1990 first elected in 2017 as Conservative member for Sturgeon River—Parkland, Alberta.
- John Edward Lloyd b. 1908 first elected in 1963 as Liberal member for Halifax, Nova Scotia.

== Lo ==
- Ben Lobb b. 1976 first elected in 2008 as Conservative member for Huron—Bruce, Ontario.
- Alaina Lockhart b. 1974 first elected in 2015 as Liberal member for Fundy Royal, New Brunswick.
- Norman James Macdonald Lockhart b. 1884 first elected in 1935 as Conservative member for Lincoln, Ontario.
- Edward Russell Lockyer b. 1899 first elected in 1958 as Progressive Conservative member for Trinity, Ontario.
- Hance James Logan b. 1869 first elected in 1896 as Liberal member for Cumberland, Nova Scotia.
- William Stewart Loggie b. 1850 first elected in 1904 as Liberal member for Northumberland, New Brunswick.
- Bernard Loiselle b. 1948 first elected in 1974 as Liberal member for Chambly, Quebec.
- Gérard Loiselle b. 1921 first elected in 1957 as Independent Liberal member for St. Ann, Quebec.
- Gilles Loiselle b. 1929 first elected in 1988 as Progressive Conservative member for Langelier, Quebec.
- Edison John Clayton Loney b. 1929 first elected in 1963 as Progressive Conservative member for Bruce, Ontario.
- Charles Edwin Long b. 1879 first elected in 1917 as Liberal member for North Battleford, Saskatchewan.
- Wayne Long b. 1963 first elected in 2015 as Liberal member for Saint John—Rothesay, New Brunswick.
- Judi Longfield b. 1947 first elected in 1997 as Liberal member for Whitby—Ajax, Ontario.
- Lloyd Longfield b. 1956 first elected in 2015 as Liberal member for Guelph, Ontario.
- Avard Longley b. 1823 first elected in 1878 as Conservative member for Annapolis, Nova Scotia.
- Bruce Lonsdale b. 1949 first elected in 1980 as Liberal member for Timiskaming, Ontario.
- Ricardo Lopez b. 1937 first elected in 1984 as Progressive Conservative member for Châteauguay, Quebec.
- Joseph Arthur Lortie b. 1869 first elected in 1908 as Conservative member for Soulanges, Quebec.
- Yvan Loubier b. 1959 first elected in 1993 as Bloc Québécois member for Saint-Hyacinthe—Bagot, Quebec.
- William John Loucks b. 1873 first elected in 1930 as Liberal member for Rosetown, Saskatchewan.
- Tim Louis b. 1969 first elected in 2019 as Liberal member for Kitchener—Conestoga, Ontario.
- William Lount b. 1840 first elected in 1896 as Liberal member for Toronto Centre, Ontario.
- Charles Henry Lovell b. 1854 first elected in 1908 as Liberal member for Stanstead, Quebec.
- Henry Lovell b. 1828 first elected in 1900 as Liberal member for Stanstead, Quebec.
- Lewis Johnstone Lovett b. 1867 first elected in 1921 as Liberal member for Digby and Annapolis, Nova Scotia.
- William James Lovie b. 1868 first elected in 1921 as Progressive member for Macdonald, Manitoba.
- John Lovitt b. 1832 first elected in 1887 as Liberal member for Yarmouth, Nova Scotia.
- Solon Earl Low b. 1900 first elected in 1945 as Social Credit member for Peace River, Alberta.
- Thomas Andrew Low b. 1871 first elected in 1908 as Liberal member for Renfrew South, Ontario.
- James A. Lowell b. 1849 first elected in 1892 as Liberal member for Welland, Ontario.
- Eric Lowther b. 1954 first elected in 1997 as Reform member for Calgary Centre, Alberta.
- George di Madeiros Loy b. 1840 first elected in 1900 as Liberal member for Beauharnois, Quebec.

== Lu ==
- William Thomas Lucas b. 1875 first elected in 1921 as United Farmers of Alberta member for Victoria, Alberta.
- Michael Luchkovich b. 1892 first elected in 1926 as United Farmers of Alberta member for Vegreville, Alberta.
- Karen Ludwig b. 1964 first elected in 2015 as Liberal member for New Brunswick Southwest, New Brunswick.
- Tom Lukiwski b. 1951 first elected in 2004 as Conservative member for Regina—Lumsden—Lake Centre, Saskatchewan.
- Edward C. Lumley b. 1939 first elected in 1974 as Liberal member for Stormont—Dundas, Ontario.
- John Lundrigan b. 1939 first elected in 1968 as Progressive Conservative member for Gander—Twillingate, Newfoundland and Labrador.
- Gary Lunn b. 1957 first elected in 1997 as Reform member for Saanich—Gulf Islands, British Columbia.
- James D. Lunney b. 1951 first elected in 2000 as Canadian Alliance member for Nanaimo—Alberni, British Columbia.
- Azel Randolph Lusby b. 1907 first elected in 1953 as Liberal member for Cumberland, Nova Scotia.
- Marcel Lussier b. 1944 first elected in 2006 as Bloc Québécois member for Brossard—La Prairie, Quebec.

== Ly ==
- James S. Lynch b. 1841 first elected in 1871 as Liberal member for Marquette, Manitoba.
