= Progressive Conservative Party of Canada candidates in the 1980 Canadian federal election =

The Progressive Conservative Party of Canada fielded a full slate of candidates in the 1980 federal election, and won 103 seats to form the Official Opposition in the House of Commons of Canada. The party had previously formed a minority government after winning a plurality of seats in the 1979 election.

== Quebec ==
=== Bellechasse: Jean Deschênes ===
Jean Deschênes was the Progressive Conservative Party's candidate for Bellechasse in the 1979 and 1980 federal elections. He identified as a civil servant. He is not to be confused with another person of the same name who was a municipal politician in Gatineau.

Electoral record
Election	Division	Party	Votes	%	Place	Winner
1979 federal	Bellechasse	Progressive Conservative	2,924	7.26	3/6	Adrien Lambert, Social Credit
1980 federal	Bellechasse	Progressive Conservative	2,912	7.22	3/6	Alain Garant, Liberal

=== Saint-Léonard—Anjou: Pierre Gauthier ===
Pierre Gauthier identified as a lawyer. He received 2,972 votes (5.71%), finishing third against Liberal incumbent Monique Bégin.

== Ontario ==
=== Broadview—Greenwood: Michael Clarke ===
Clarke has a degree in Economics and Political Science from the University of Guelph. He was a real estate agent, and was president of the York East Progressive Conservative Riding Association in the 1970s. He sought the Progressive Conservative nomination for Broadview in a 1978 by-election, but lost to Tom Clifford. He first ran for the Progressive Conservatives in 1979 for Broadview—Greenwood, after losing the Scarborough Centre nomination to Diane Stratas. He was thirty-three years old in 1980.

Clarke later managed Michael Hordo's campaign for the Broadview—Greenwood Progressive Conservative nomination in a 1982 by-election.

Electoral record
Election	Division	Party	Votes	%	Place	Winner
1979 federal	Broadview—Greenwood	Progressive Conservative	9,987	30.08	2/7	Bob Rae, New Democratic Party
1980 federal	Broadview—Greenwood	Progressive Conservative	7,677	23.92	3/9	Bob Rae, New Democratic Party

=== Nickel Belt: Dennis Tappenden ===
Dennis Tappenden was an Ontario Provincial Police (OPP) corporal. In 1980, he was the force's community relations officer for the Sudbury district. He was the first provincial policeman to seek election to public office in Ontario, after changes to the Public Service Act. He received 4,250 votes (10.20%), finishing third against Liberal candidate Judy Erola.

Some local Progressive Conservatives later indicated that they deliberately ran a weak campaign in order to give Erola a victory over New Democratic Party incumbent John Rodriguez. In return, they said, the Liberals agreed to field weak candidates against Sudbury-area Progressive Conservatives in the 1981 provincial election.

Tappenden was subsequently charged with discreditable conduct under the Ontario Police Act, which prohibits police officers from becoming involved in politics. An OPP spokesman said that Tappenden had been denied a leave of absence to run for office (using his vacation days instead), and that the Police Act took precedence over the Public Service Act in police matters. The leaders of Ontario's Liberal and New Democratic parties defended Tappenden, and a The Globe and Mail editorial opined that he should be given the right to seek public office. A board dealing with civil service complaints later decided, by a vote of 2 to 1, that Tappenden had been within his rights to run for office and that the Police Act should be changed.

== Manitoba ==
=== Winnipeg—Birds Hill: John Froese ===
Froese was a real estate broker at the time of the election. He received 13,385 votes (29.44%), finishing second against New Democratic Party incumbent Bill Blaikie.

A Winnipeg realtor named John Froese later became president of the Manitoba Real Estate Association, was appointed as a Manitoba representative on the Canadian Real Estate Association in November 2000, and became chair of the Manitoba Securities Commission's Real Estate Advisory Committee. It is assumed that this is the same person.
