= Henri Dorion =

Canadian geographer and academic (1935–2026)

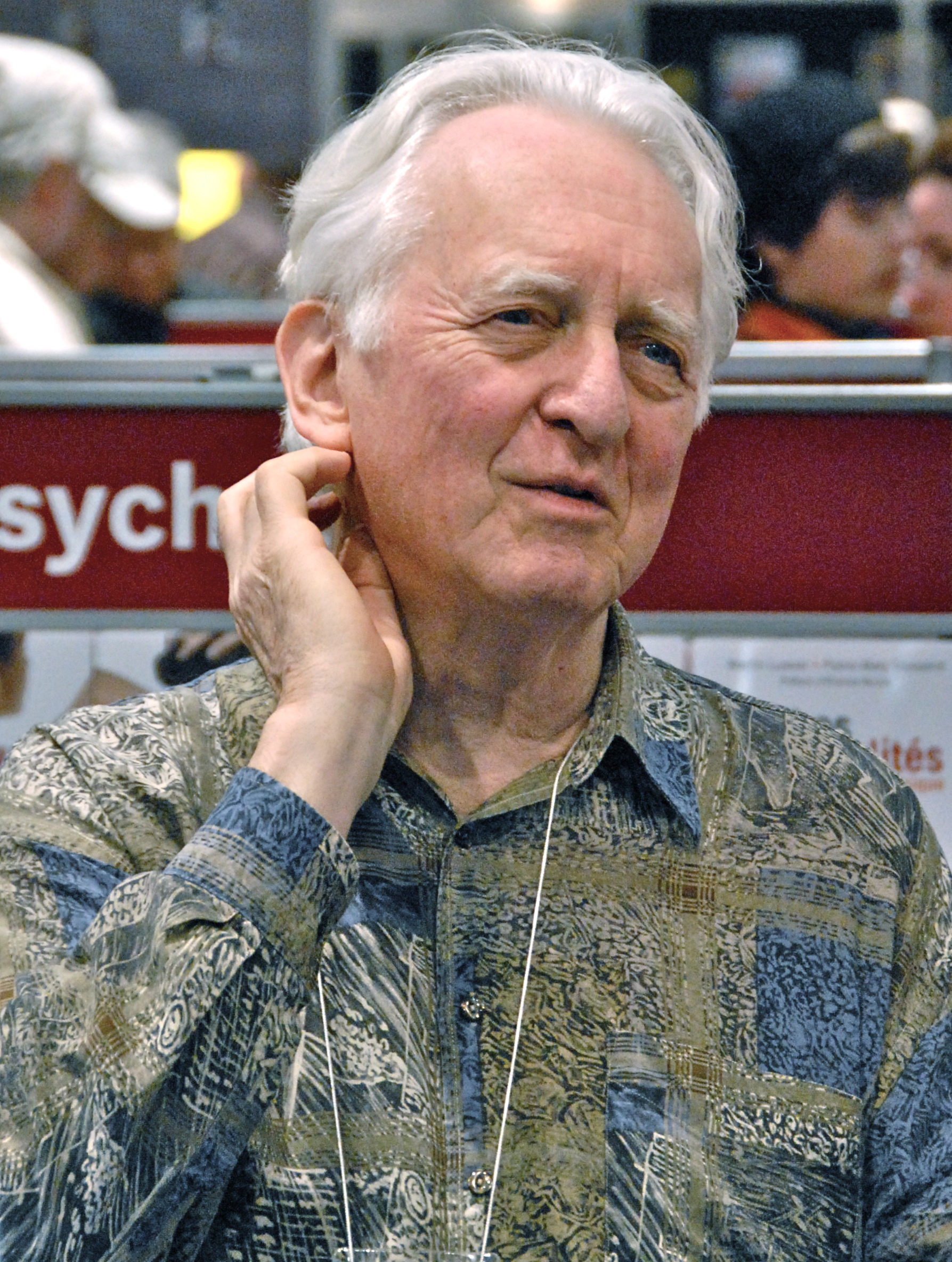
- Dorion in 2012
- Born: 4 May 1935; Quebec City, Quebec, Canada
- Died: 12 January 2026 (aged 90); Quebec City, Quebec, Canada
- Occupations: Geographer, academic
- Employer(s): Université Laval; Musée de la civilisation
- Spouse: Renée Hudon
- Father: Noël Dorion
- Relatives: Charles-Napoléon Dorion (uncle); Frédéric Dorion (uncle); Catherine Dorion (niece)

Henri Dorion (4 May 1935 – 12 January 2026) was a Canadian geographer and academic.

== Life and career ==
=== Early life and family ===
Born in Quebec City on 4 May 1935, Dorion was the son of politician Noël Dorion and his wife, Olga Malherbe. After pursuing his passions of piano, geography, and languages, an accident forced him to abandon his desire to become a pianist. He was instead admitted to the Bar of Quebec in 1958. Dorion was father of actress Nathalie Coupal, dancer Geneviève Dorion-Coupal, musologist Anik Dorion-Coupal, and anthropologist Karen Dorion-Coupal. He was also the uncle of politician Catherine Dorion and the nephew of politician Charles-Napoléon Dorion and judge Frédéric Dorion. His wife was journalist and academic Renée Hudon.

=== Career ===
Dorion became an expert in the fields of geography and toponymy, writing a Master's thesis on the toponymy of Labrador. He was a professor at the Université Laval from 1964 to 1980. He also held leadership roles in various commissions, such as the United Nations Group of Experts on Geographical Names and the Commission d'étude sur l'intégrité du territoire du Québec. In 1978, he was named president of the Commission de toponymie du Québec, a position in which he held three nonconsecutive terms. He directed conservation, research, and international exhibits at the Musée de la civilisation from 1988 to 1993, to which he donated several musical instruments. Some of his works have been digitized by the Centre collégial de développement de matériel didactique. He organized 15 different public displays of different different countries in relation to their art and history.

=== Death ===
Dorion died in Quebec City on 12 January 2026, at the age of 90.

== Publications ==
- La frontière Québec-Terreneuve : contribution à l'étude systématique des frontières (1963)
- Rapport de la Commission d'étude sur l'intégrité du territoire du Québec de 1966 à 1972 (1972)
- Le Russionnaire : Petite encyclopédie de toutes les Russies (2001)
- Quebec from the air, From Season To Season (2001)
- Living in Quebec (2004)
- Québec : villes et villages vus du ciel (2005)
- Le Quebec au naturel : sur les chemins de la découverte / The Nature of Quebec: A Journey of Discovery (2006)
- Éloge de la Frontière (2006)
- Lieux de légendes et de mystère du Québec; CD de 10 chansons inclus (par Nathalie Coupal) (2009)
- Le Québec, territoire incertain (2011)
- Le Québec à couper le souffle : 100 belvédères pour comprendre nos paysages (2011)
- Le Québec autrement dit et un tour du monde en surnoms (2013)
- Québec et ses lieux de mémoire : noms d'hier et surnoms d'aujourd'hui (2013)
- Québec, Canada, Russie : 100 miroirs (2016)
- Les PLUS du Québec (2017)

== Awards and honors ==
- Member of the Royal Society of Canada (1970)
- Jacques Rousseau Award (1989)
- Massey Medal (1994)
- Knight of the Ordre national du Québec (1997)
- Officer of the Order of Canada (1999)
- Prix Léon-Gérin (2004)
- Prix de la présidence de l'Assemblée nationale (2012)
- Honorary doctorate from the Université Laval (2019)
