= Garant (surname) =

Garant is a surname. Notable people with the surname include:

- Alain Garant (born 1952), Canadian politician
- Kevin Garant (born 1963), American guitarist, composer, and sound designer.
- Robert Ben Garant (born 1970), American actor, comedian, writer, director and producer.
- Serge Garant (1929–1986), Canadian composer, conductor, academic, and radio host.
- Sylvie Garant (born 1957), French Canadian model
