= Gilles Létourneau =

Canadian lawyer and judge (born 1945)

The Honourable Gilles Létourneau PC

Judge of the Federal Court of Appeal
- In office July 2, 2003 – July 1, 2009

Judge of the Federal Court of Canada – Appeal Division
- In office May 13, 1992 – July 2, 2003

Judge of the Court Martial Appeal Court
- In office May 13, 1992 – July 1, 2009

Personal details
- Born: July 14, 1945 (age 81) St-Michel, Bellechasse County, Quebec
- Education: Université Laval; London School of Economics and Political Science(Master and PhD)

Gilles Létourneau (born July 14, 1945) is a Canadian lawyer and retired judge of the Federal Court of Appeal and the Court Martial Appeal Court of Canada.

== Early life and education ==
Born July 14, 1945, St-Michel, Bellechasse County, Quebec, Justice Létourneau was educated at Université Laval and holds a Ph.D. in Law and Criminal Procedure from the London School of Economics and Political Science.

== Academic career and scholarship ==
Justice Létourneau has served as vice-dean, director of undergraduate studies and professor in the law faculty of Laval University, and is the author or co-author of over 100 texts, reports or articles connected with the law, legislation, the administration of justice and reform. Between 1977 and 1985, he served as Quebec editor of the Canadian law report Criminal Reports.

Létourneau serves on the advisory board for The Sedona Conference, a forum dedicated to the advanced study of law and policy.

== Judicial career ==
From 1977 to 1995, Létourneau worked in the Department of Justice in Quebec. After serving five years as vice-president, Létourneau was appointed president of the Law Reform Commission of Canada on July 5, 1990. In 1991, he was appointed Queen's Counsel and on May 13, 1992, Judge of the Federal Court of Canada, Appeal Division and ex officio member of the Trial Division, and Judge of the Court Martial Appeal Court of Canada on May 13, 1992.

On March 20, 1995, he was appointed chairman of the Commission of Inquiry into the Deployment of Canadian Forces to Somalia and remained on the commission for the duration of its nearly two-year term.

On July 2, 2003, the date of the coming into force of the Courts Administration Service Act, he became a judge of the Federal Court of Appeal. He retired on July 1, 2009.
