= Pierre Blais =

Canadian politician and jurist (born 1940)

The Honourable Pierre Blais PC

Chairman of the Security Intelligence Review Committee
- In office May 1, 2015 – July 19, 2019
- Appointed by: Stephen Harper
- Preceded by: Deborah Grey (acting)
- Succeeded by: Marie Deschamps (as Chair of the NSIRA)

2nd Chief Justice of the Federal Court of Appeal
- In office September 22, 2009 – June 23, 2014
- Nominated by: Stephen Harper
- Appointed by: Michaëlle Jean
- Preceded by: John D. Richard
- Succeeded by: Karen Sharlow

President of the Privy Council
- In office June 25, 1993 – November 3, 1993
- Prime Minister: Kim Campbell
- Preceded by: Joe Clark
- Succeeded by: Marcel Massé

Minister of Justice
- In office January 4, 1993 – November 3, 1993
- Prime Minister: Brian Mulroney; Kim Campbell
- Preceded by: Kim Campbell
- Succeeded by: Allan Rock

Minister of Consumer and Corporate Affairs
- In office February 23, 1990 – January 3, 1993
- Prime Minister: Brian Mulroney
- Preceded by: Bernard Valcourt (1989)
- Succeeded by: Pierre H. Vincent

Solicitor General of Canada
- In office January 30, 1989 – February 22, 1990
- Prime Minister: Brian Mulroney
- Preceded by: James Kelleher (1988)
- Succeeded by: Pierre Cadieux

Member of Parliament for Bellechasse
- In office September 4, 1984 – October 25, 1993
- Preceded by: Alain Garant
- Succeeded by: François Langlois

Personal details
- Born: December 30, 1948 (age 77) Berthier-sur-Mer, Quebec, Canada
- Education: Laval University

Pierre Blais PC (French pronunciation: [pjɛʁ blɛ]; born December 30, 1948) is a Canadian jurist and former politician and Cabinet minister. He also served as the Chief Justice of the Federal Court of Appeal until his retirement in June 2014.

On May 1, 2015, Blais was appointed as chairman of the Security Intelligence Review Committee by Prime Minister Stephen Harper, replacing Interim Chair Deborah Grey who was stepping down from the Committee. The SIRC was dissolved on July 19, 2019, with the creation of the National Security and Intelligence Review Agency. Blais served as a member of the NSIRA until his term expired on May 1, 2020.

== Education ==
Blais holds both a BA (1968) and an LLL (1976) from Laval University.

== Political career ==
Blais entered the House of Commons of Canada as the Progressive Conservative Member of Parliament (MP) for Bellechasse, Quebec through the 1984 election.

In 1987, Prime Minister Brian Mulroney appointed Blais to Cabinet as Minister of State for agriculture. Two years later, he was promoted to the position of Solicitor-General. In 1990, he became Minister of Consumer and Corporate Affairs and, in 1993, was appointed by Mulroney to the position of Minister of Justice.

Blais retained this position, and added the position of President of the Queen's Privy Council for Canada when Kim Campbell succeeded Mulroney as PC leader and prime minister.

Blais's political career came to an end when he was defeated, along with the Campbell government, in the 1993 election.

== Judicial career ==
A member of both the Quebec and Ontario bar, Blais was appointed a Justice of the Federal Court of Canada, Trial Division, an ex officio member of the Court of Appeal and Judge of the Court Martial Appeal Court of Canada in June 1998.

Through 2004, Blais presided over hearings related to Holocaust denier Ernst Zündel's detention under a National Security Certificate. In February 2005, he ruled that the security certificate was valid and that the government could deport Zundel immediately.

On February 20, 2008, Blais was appointed to the Federal Court of Appeal. On September 9, 2009, he was appointed chief justice of the Federal Court of Appeal.

Blais retired as Chief Justice of the Federal Court of Appeal effective June 23, 2014.

Parliament of Canada
Preceded by Alain Garant	Member of Parliament for Bellechasse; 1984–1993	Succeeded by François Langlois
Political offices
Preceded by Perrin Beatty	Solicitor General of Canada; 1989–1990	Succeeded by Pierre Cadieux
Preceded by Harvie Andre	Minister of Consumer and Corporate Affairs; 1990–1993	Succeeded by Pierre H. Vincent
Preceded by Kim Campbell	Minister of Justice; 1993	Succeeded by Allan Rock
Preceded by Joe Clark	President of the Privy Council; 1993	Succeeded by Marcel Massé
