= Achille Lauro =

Achille Lauro may refer to:

- Achille Lauro (businessman) (1887–1982), an Italian businessman and politician
- Achille Lauro (singer) (born 1990), an Italian musician
- MS Achille Lauro, a cruise ship based in Italy
  - Achille Lauro hijacking of this ship in 1985

== See also ==
- Achille Larue
