= Louis-Philippe Picard =

Canadian politician

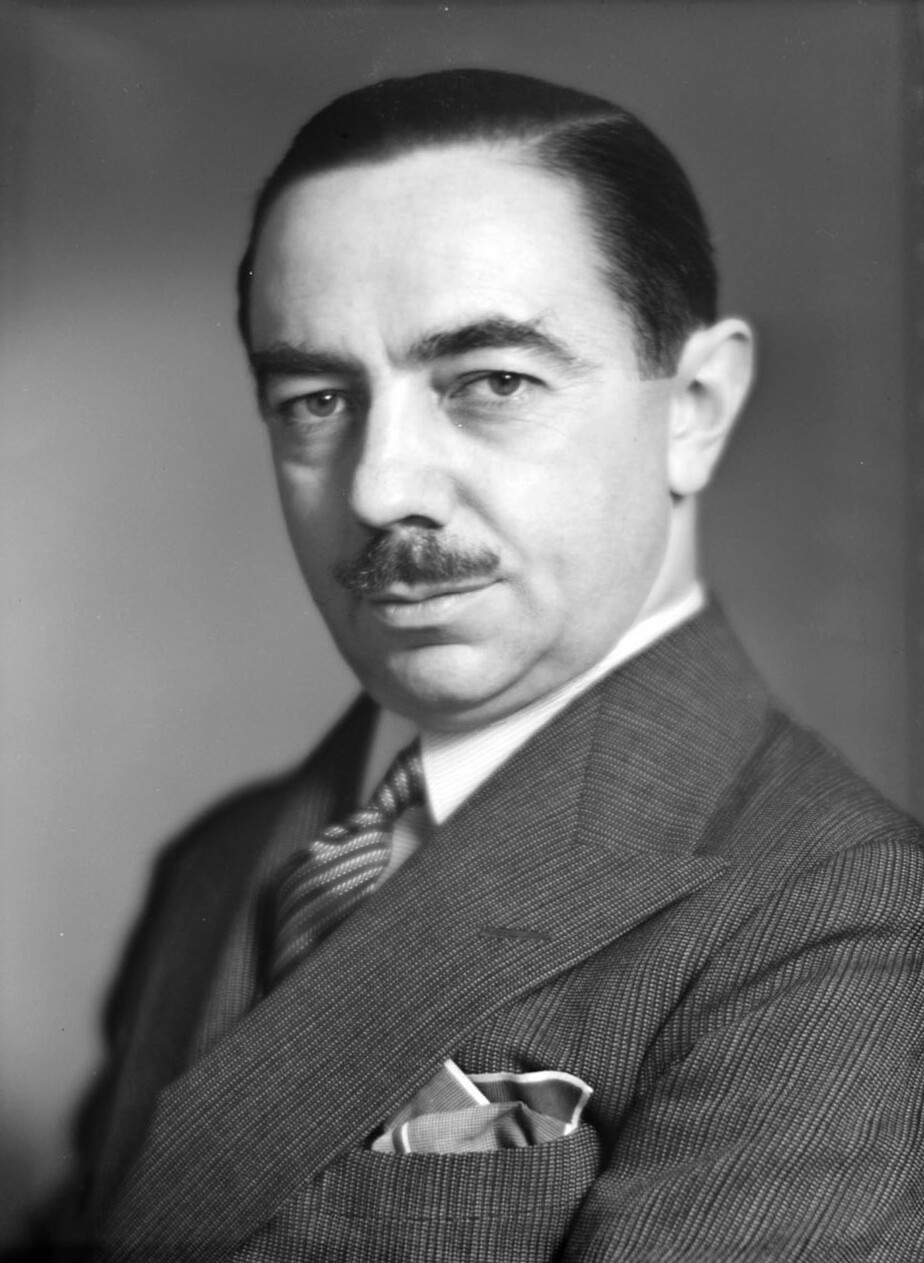
- Picard, c. 1937

Member of Parliament for Bellechasse
- In office March 1940 – February 1950
- Preceded by: Oscar Boulanger
- Succeeded by: Ovide Laflamme

Personal details
- Born: 12 August 1899 Rivière-du-Loup, Quebec
- Died: 22 May 1959 (aged 59) Quebec City, Quebec
- Party: Liberal
- Spouse: Madeleine Mercier Barbara Lever
- Children: 3
- Profession: executive assistant, lawyer, reporter, ambassador
- 17 January 1957 Canadian Ambassador to Argentina to 30 September 1958

Louis-Philippe Picard (12 August 1899 – 22 May 1959) was a Liberal party member of the House of Commons of Canada. He was born in Rivière-du-Loup, Quebec and became an executive assistant, lawyer and reporter by career.

Picard was educated at the Quebec Seminary where he received a Bachelor of Arts degree in 1920. He then graduated from Université Laval in 1923 with a law degree and attended The Hague Academy of International Law. In 1924, he received his commission to practice law in Quebec. Picard was also a newspaper reporter of the court systems for L'Évenement and Le Soleil.

He was first elected to Parliament at the Bellechasse riding in the 1940 general election then re-elected for successive terms in 1945, 1949 and 1953. In August 1955, Picard resigned during his term in the 22nd Canadian Parliament and accepted an appointment as Canada's ambassador to Argentina and served there until the following year.

Picard died in Quebec City from coronary thrombosis on 22 May 1959.
