= Onésiphore Ernest Talbot =

Canadian politician (1854–1934)

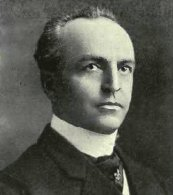

Member of the Canadian Parliament for Bellechasse
- In office 1896–1911
- Preceded by: Guillaume Amyot
- Succeeded by: Joseph Octave Lavallée

Personal details
- Born: August 15, 1854 St-Arsène, Temiscouata County, Canada East
- Died: May 6, 1934 (aged 79)
- Party: Liberal

Onésiphore Ernest Talbot (August 15, 1854 – May 6, 1934) was a Canadian politician.

Born in St-Arsène, Temiscouata County, Canada East, Talbot was educated at St. Michel and the Quebec Seminary. A farmer, he was a member of the Council of Agriculture in the Province of Quebec and was awarded Quebec's Ordre national du mérite agricole. He was a Lieutenant-Colonel with the 17th Regiment de Lévis and Bellechasse. He was elected to the House of Commons of Canada for Bellechasse in the 1896 federal election. A Liberal, he was re-elected in 1900, 1904, and 1908. He was defeated in 1911.
