= Noël Dorion =

Canadian politician (1904–1980)

The Honourable Noël Dorion PC

Member of the Canadian Parliament for Bellechasse
- In office 12 May 1958 – 19 April 1962
- Preceded by: Ovide Laflamme
- Succeeded by: Bernard Dumont

Secretary of State for Canada
- In office 11 October 1960 – 5 July 1962
- Prime Minister: John Diefenbaker
- Preceded by: Henri Courtemanche
- Succeeded by: Ernest Halpenny

President of the Privy Council
- In office 28 December 1961 – 5 July 1962
- Prime Minister: John Diefenbaker
- Preceded by: John Diefenbaker
- Succeeded by: John Diefenbaker

Personal details
- Born: 24 July 1904 Charlesbourg, Quebec, Canada
- Died: 9 March 1980 (aged 75)
- Party: Progressive Conservative
- Relations: Charles-Napoléon Dorion (brother); Frédéric Dorion (brother); Renée Hudon (daughter-in-law); Catherine Dorion (granddaughter)
- Children: Henri Dorion
- Profession: Lawyer, professor of law

Noël Dorion, PC (24 July 1904 – 9 March 1980) was a Canadian law professor, lawyer and politician.

Dorion was called to the bar in 1927 and was the founding president of the Jeune Barreau de Québec in 1934. He was the crown attorney who prosecuted Wilbert Coffin in 1954. The "Coffin affair", as it became known, was a contributing factor in the decision to abolish the death penalty in Canada as it became a widespread belief that Coffin was wrongly convicted and executed.

Dorion entered politics in the 1945 federal election, running as an independent in Quebec East, but was unsuccessful. Dorion finished in second place behind Louis St. Laurent, and was the unofficial Conservative standard-bearer as the riding had no official Tory candidate. He ran as an independent along with his brother Frédéric Dorion, an incumbent MP, due to his opposition to conscription in the Conscription Crisis of 1944.

In the 1958 election he was elected as the Progressive Conservative (PC) Member of Parliament (MP) for Bellechasse riding as part of PC leader John Diefenbaker's landslide victory.

Dorion was appointed to the Canadian Cabinet in 1960 as Secretary of State for Canada, and was reassigned to the position of President of the Queen's Privy Council for Canada in 1961. He held this position until his defeat in the 1962 federal election. Dorion returned to his law practice and remained an active lawyer until his death.

His brothers Frédéric Dorion and Charles-Napoléon Dorion were also MPs at various times.

He was the father of Canadian geographer and academic Henri Dorion. His granddaughter Catherine Dorion was a former member of the National Assembly of Quebec.

== Sources ==
- "Law Society of Quebec biographies" (in French). Archived from the original on 10 May 2006.
