= Louis-Napoléon Casault =

Canadian politician

The Honourable Sir Louis-Napoléon Casault
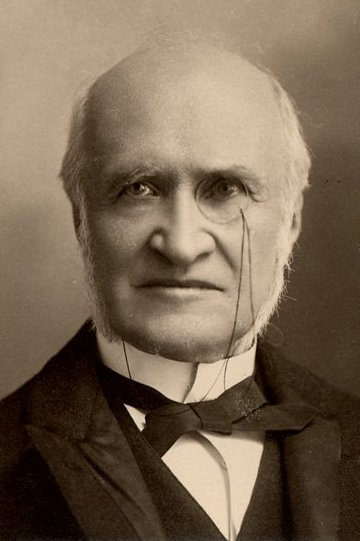

Member of the Canadian Parliament for Bellechasse
- In office 1867–1870
- Preceded by: The electoral district was created by the British North America Act, 1867
- Succeeded by: Télesphore Fournier

Member of the Legislative Assembly of the Province of Canada for Montmagny
- In office 1854–1858
- Succeeded by: Joseph-Octave Beaubien

Personal details
- Born: July 10, 1823 Saint-Pierre-de-la-Rivière-du-Sud, Canada East
- Died: May 18, 1908 (aged 84)
- Party: Conservative

Sir Louis-Napoléon Casault (July 10, 1823 – May 18, 1908) was a Quebec lawyer, judge, professor and political figure. He represented Bellechasse in the 1st Canadian Parliament from 1867 to 1870 as a Conservative member.

== Biography ==
He was born in Saint-Pierre-de-la-Rivière-du-Sud in 1823. He studied at the Petit Séminaire de Québec, then apprenticed in law and was admitted to the bar in 1847. He practiced law at Quebec City. In 1854, he was elected to represent Montmagny in the Legislative Assembly of the Province of Canada. From 1858 to 1891, Casault taught commercial and maritime law at the Université Laval. In 1867, he was named Queen's Counsel. He was elected to the House of Commons in 1867 but resigned his seat in 1870 to accept a post as judge in the Superior Court of Quebec for Kamaraska district; in 1873, he was named to Quebec district. From 1894 until his retirement in 1904, he was Chief Justice for the Province of Quebec. He was knighted in 1894.

Casault died at Quebec City in 1908. A small lake in the unorganized territory of Lac-Casault, Quebec, Canada, was named after him.

== Family ==
Hon Justice Louis-Napoléon Casault married Elmire Jane Pangman, daughter of Hon. John Pangman, M.L.C., and Seigneur of Lachenaye, July 1870. Their family residence was "Londesir" 9 de Salaberry Street, Quebec. Lady Casault was elected the first President of the Quebec branch of the National Council of Women of Canada, when that institution was founded by Ishbel Hamilton-Gordon, Marchioness of Aberdeen and Temair. She was also a member of various other bodies of a religious or benevolent character.

1867 Canadian federal election: Bellechasse
Party	Candidate	Votes
Conservative	Louis-Napoléon Casault	983
Unknown	Édouard Rémillard	671
Source: Canadian Elections Database
