= Joseph-Goderic Blanchet =

Canadian politician

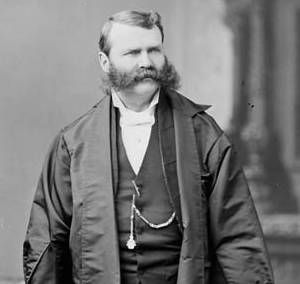
- Blanchet in March 1879

3rd Speaker of the House of Commons
- In office February 13, 1879 – February 7, 1883
- Preceded by: Timothy Warren Anglin
- Succeeded by: George Airey Kirkpatrick

1st Speaker of the Legislative Assembly of Quebec
- In office 1867–1875
- Preceded by: Position established
- Succeeded by: Pierre Fortin

Member of the Canadian Parliament for Lévis
- In office 1867–1874
- Preceded by: Position established
- Succeeded by: Louis-Honoré Fréchette
- In office 1878–1883
- Preceded by: Louis-Honoré Fréchette
- Succeeded by: Isidore-Noël Belleau

Member of the Canadian Parliament for Bellechasse
- In office 1875–1878
- Preceded by: Télesphore Fournier
- Succeeded by: Achille Larue

Member of the Legislative Assembly of Quebec for Lévis
- In office 1867–1875
- Preceded by: Position established
- Succeeded by: Étienne-Théodore Pâquet

Member of the Legislative Assembly of the Province of Canada from Lévis
- In office 1861–1866
- Preceded by: François-Xavier Lemieux
- Succeeded by: Legislature abolished

Personal details
- Born: June 7, 1829 Saint-Pierre-de-la-Rivière-du-Sud, Lower Canada
- Died: January 1, 1890 (aged 60)
- Party: Liberal-Conservative; Conservative; Conservative Party of Quebec
- Occupation: Physician

Joseph-Goderic Blanchet (French pronunciation: [ʒozɛf ɡɔdʁik blɑ̃ʃɛ]; or Joseph-Godric; June 7, 1829 – January 1, 1890) was a Canadian medical doctor and politician. He was the only person to serve as both speaker of the House of Commons and speaker of a provincial legislature. He represented Lévis in the House of Commons as a Liberal-Conservative member from 1867 to 1873 and from 1879 to 1883; he represented Bellechasse from 1875 to 1878. He also represented Lévis in the Legislative Assembly of Quebec from 1867 to 1875.

== Biography ==
He was born in Saint-Pierre-de-la-Rivière-du-Sud, Lower Canada in 1825. He studied at the Petit Séminaire de Québec and Collège de Sainte-Anne-de-la-Pocatière. He then studied medicine with his uncle Jean Blanchet and qualified as a doctor in 1850. A popular physician, Blanchet entered politics with his election as mayor of Notre-Dame-de-la-Victoire, now part of Lévis Quebec (then Canada East) in 1845 at the age of 25. With the Province of Canada on military alert due to the American Civil War, Blanchet joined the militia and raised a battalion to defend the frontier against raids from the United States. During the Fenian Raids of 1866 and 1870, he was in command of the militia on the south shore of the St. Lawrence River.

Blanchet was a Conservative and first ran for election to the Legislative Assembly in 1857 but was defeated. He was elected to the Legislative Assembly for Lévis in 1861 and 1863. He supported Canadian Confederation as a means of defending British North America against possible attack by the United States.

He was concurrently elected in the 1867 federal election to the new House of Commons and to the Quebec Legislative Assembly. Under the law of the day, he was allowed to be a member of both legislatures at the same time.

He became Speaker of the provincial legislature and served in that position for two terms.

In the federal House of Commons, Blanchet was appointed by John A. Macdonald to the parliamentary committee to investigate allegations related to the Pacific Scandal in 1873.

The federal election law was changed in 1874 to prohibit members of Parliament (MPs) from concurrently sitting in a provincial legislature. Blanchet chose to resign his seat in the federal House of Commons. After losing his seat in the Quebec legislature to the much younger Étienne-Théodore Pâquet in the 1875 Quebec provincial election, he won a federal by-election in 1875 and returned to Ottawa as MP for Bellechasse. In the 1878 federal election, he ran in his old riding of Lévis. The election returned the Conservatives to power, and Macdonald nominated Blanchet to be speaker of the House of Commons.

Due to the tradition of alternating between English and French Speakers after each election, he returned to the backbenches following the 1882 election despite a successful term as Speaker. In 1883, he resigned from Parliament in order to accept a position as Collector of Customs for the Port of Quebec and served in that position until his death at Lévis in 1890 at the age of 60. He was buried in the crypt of Notre-Dame Church of Lévis.

== Electoral record ==
1867 Canadian federal election: Lévis
Party	Candidate	Votes
Liberal–Conservative	Joseph-Goderic Blanchet	acclaimed
Source: Canadian Elections Database

1872 Canadian federal election: Lévis
Party	Candidate	Votes
Liberal–Conservative	Joseph-Goderic Blanchet	1,564
Independent	Louis-Honoré Fréchette	1,475
Source: Canadian Elections Database

By-election on 23 November 1875 Fournier appointed to the Supreme Court Bench
Party	Candidate	Votes
Conservative	Joseph Goderic Blanchet	698
Liberal	Achille Larue	443
Unknown	Pierre Boutin	359
