= Guy Marcoux =

Canadian politician

Member of Parliament for Québec—Montmorency
- In office June 1962 – September 1965
- Preceded by: Robert Lafrenière
- Succeeded by: Ovide Laflamme

Personal details
- Born: 21 February 1924 Beauport, Quebec, Canada
- Died: 23 September 2011 (aged 87) Quebec City, Quebec, Canada
- Party: Social Credit
- Profession: physician

Guy Marcoux (21 February 1924 – 23 September 2011) was a Social Credit party member of the House of Commons of Canada. He was a physician by career.

He was first elected at the Québec—Montmorency riding in the 1962 general election then re-elected in 1963. Marcoux became an independent candidate in the 1965 election with Henri Borgia as the Ralliement créditiste candidate. However, Marcoux was defeated at Québec—Montmorency by Ovide Laflamme of the Liberal party.

== Archives ==
There is a Guy Marcoux fonds at Library and Archives Canada. Archival reference number is R7131.
