= Bellechasse—Etchemins—Montmagny—L'Islet =

Former federal electoral district in Quebec, Canada

Quebec electoral district

Defunct federal electoral district
- Legislature: House of Commons
- District created: 1996
- District abolished: 2003
- First contested: 1997
- Last contested: 2000

Bellechasse—Etchemins—Montmagny—L'Islet (formerly known as Bellechasse—Montmagny—L'Islet) was a federal electoral district in Quebec, Canada, that was represented in the House of Commons of Canada from 1997 to 2004.

It was created as "Bellechasse—Montmagny—L'Islet" in 1996 from Bellechasse electoral district. It was renamed "Bellechasse—Etchemins—Montmagny—L'Islet" in 1997. It was abolished in 2003 when it was redistributed into Lévis—Bellechasse and Rivière-du-Loup—Montmagny ridings.

The district consisted of the cities of L'Islet, Lac-Etchemin, Montmagny and Saint-Pamphile, the Regional County Municipalities of Bellechasse, L'Islet, Montmagny and Les Etchemins (except the municipalities of Saint-Benjamin, Saint-Prosper, Saint-Zacharie and Sainte-Aurélie).

== Members of Parliament ==
This riding elected only one Member of Parliament:

Parliament	Years	Member	Party
Bellechasse—Etchemins—Montmagny—L'Islet; Riding created from Bellechasse
36th	1997–2000	Gilbert Normand	Liberal
37th	2000–2004	Gilbert Normand	Liberal
Riding dissolved into Lévis—Bellechasse and Rivière-du-Loup—Montmagny

Normand won the 1997 election narrowly over François Langlois of the Bloc Québécois, but beat him in 2000 handily.

== Election results ==
1997 Canadian federal election
Party	Candidate	Votes
Liberal	Gilbert Normand	14,100
Bloc Québécois	François Langlois	14,053
Progressive Conservative	Denis Roy	12,840
Reform	Gaétan Pouliot	611
New Democratic	Branda Michaud	520

2000 Canadian federal election
Party	Candidate	Votes
Liberal	Gilbert Normand	19,163
Bloc Québécois	François Langlois	14,973
Alliance	Jean-Claude Roy	4,224
Progressive Conservative	Suzanne Lafond	1,636

== See also ==
- List of Canadian electoral districts
- Historical federal electoral districts of Canada
