= Guillaume Amyot =

Canadian lawyer and politician

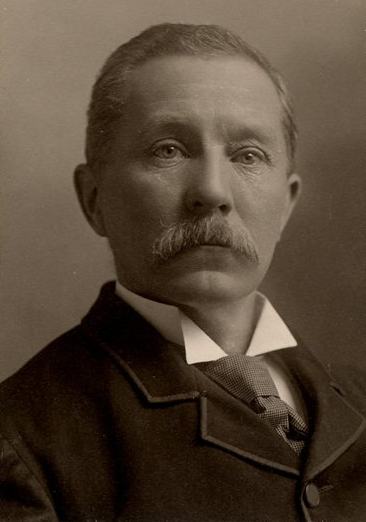

Member of the Canadian Parliament for Bellechasse
- In office 1881–1896
- Preceded by: Achille Larue
- Succeeded by: Onésiphore Ernest Talbot

Personal details
- Born: 10 December 1843 Saint-Gervais, Canada East
- Died: 30 March 1896 (aged 53) Quebec City, Quebec, Canada
- Party: Conservative

Guillaume Amyot (10 December 1843 – 30 March 1896) was a Canadian politician, editor, and lawyer. After finishing his classical studies at the Collège de Sainte-Anne-de-la-Pocatière, Amyot pursued a legal career. He was a Member of the House of Commons of Canada, which he entered in 1881, for the riding of Bellechasse, Quebec, representing the historical Conservative Party. He later switched his affiliation from Conservative to Nationalist, under which designation he was re-elected in the 1887 election. He was re-elected as a Nationalist Conservative in 1891.

Prior to entering federal politics, he stood for election twice in the Quebec general elections of 1875 and 1878, in the riding of Lotbinière. He was defeated both times by Henri-Gustave Joly de Lotbinière, a Liberal.

Amyot was also a participant in the North-West Rebellion of 1885 and was a Lieutenant-Colonel of the 9th battalion of the Voltigeurs of Quebec.
