= Joseph Oscar Lefebre Boulanger =

Canadian politician (1888–1958)

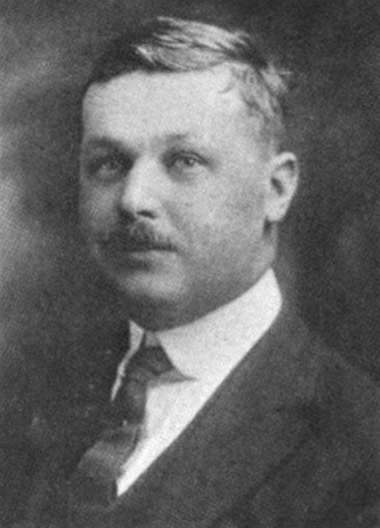
- In office 1926–1940

Personal details
- Born: November 3, 1888 Saint-Charles-de-Bellechasse, Quebec, Canada
- Died: July 21, 1958 (aged 69) Bellechasse County, Quebec, Canada
- Party: Liberal
- Spouse: Marguerite Belleau (m. 1917)
- Occupation: Lawyer

Joseph Oscar Lefebre Boulanger (November 3, 1888 – July 21, 1958) was a Canadian politician and lawyer. He was elected to the House of Commons of Canada in 1926 as a Member of the Liberal Party to represent the riding of Bellechasse. He was re-elected in 1930 and in 1935.

== Biography ==
Joseph Oscar Lefebre Boulanger was born in Saint-Charles-de-Bellechasse, Quebec on November 3, 1888.

He married Marguerite Belleau on July 26, 1917.

He died at his summer home in Bellechasse County on July 21, 1958.

== See also ==
- Politics of Canada
