= Renée Hudon =

Canadian journalist and academic (1942–2023)

- Born: 14 June 1942; Quebec City, Quebec, Canada
- Died: 20 September 2023 (aged 81); Quebec City, Quebec, Canada
- Education: Conservatoire d'art dramatique de Québec; Université Laval
- Occupations: Journalist; Professor
- Spouse: Henri Dorion

Renée Hudon (14 June 1942 – 20 September 2023) was a Canadian radio-television journalist and academic.

Her career at Télévision de Radio-Canada lasted for more than 40 years. She also worked in theatre and produced literary works. Her contributions to the French language earned her many awards and honors.

== Biography ==
Born in Quebec City on 14 June 1942, Hudon attended the Conservatoire Francis-Sinval at a young age, where she learned ballet and diction. She studied dramatic art at the Conservatoire d'art dramatique de Québec. She then studied teaching at the Université Laval.

== Career ==
At the age of 10, Hudon held a role in the Alfred Hitchcock movie I Confess, which was the first Hollywood movie filmed in Quebec and gave her the opportunity to visit Los Angeles in October 1952. In 1962, Hudon started a career in radio and television. She first appeared on the small screen for Télé-4, a channel owned by Radio-Canada. In 1964, she married Michel Auger, with whom she had two children: Valérie and Eric. She then worked as a news reader, an interviewer, and host for multiple radio shows on cultural and public affairs for more than 40 years. On television as well as radio, she directed numerous interviews with actors, directors, singers, writers, and orchestra conductors, the likes of which included Charles Aznavour, Georges Brassens, Juliette Gréco, Juliette Gréco, Yves Montand, Philippe Noiret, Charles Trenet, Jean-Louis Trintignant.

In addition to her radio and television career, Hudon also worked in the field of teaching public communication. She worked as a professor at the Collège des animateurs radio télévision and the École de diction et de communication orale. In 2004, she co-founded the oral public communications training company, Renée Hudon Parole Publique with her daughter. She also taught at Université Laval. In addition to teaching, she acted in several films and plays. In 2012, she was admitted to the Académie des Grands Québécois. Later in life, she married Sovietologist Henri Dorion, the son of former Secretary of State Noël Dorion.

Renée Hudon died in Quebec City on 20 September 2023, at the age of 81.

== Theatre ==
- Les Belles-sœurs
- Dialogues of the Carmelites
- Topaze
- Histoire des femmes

== Filmography ==
- I Confess (1952)
- The Confessional (1995)

== Literary works ==
- Jeanne à jamais (2004)
- À qui la petite fille? (2010)

== Podcasts ==
- Les secrets de famille de Renée Hudon (2019)
