= Joseph Octave Lavallée =

Canadian politician

Member of the Canadian Parliament for Bellechasse
- In office 1911–1916
- Preceded by: Onésiphore-Ernest Talbot
- Succeeded by: Charles-Alphonse Fournier

Personal details
- Born: 21 February 1878 Berthier, Quebec, Canada
- Died: 10 September 1940 (aged 62) Montreal, Quebec, Canada
- Party: Conservative
- Spouse(s): Maria Demers (m. 24 Jun 1901)
- Education: Séminaire de Joliette
- Occupation: journalist

Joseph-Octave Lavallée (21 February 1878 – 10 September 1940) was a journalist and political figure in Quebec. He represented Bellechasse in the House of Commons of Canada from 1911 to 1916 as a Conservative.

He was born in Berthier, Quebec, the son of Octave Lavallée and Philomène Champagne, and was educated at the Séminaire de Joliette. Lavallée lived in St-Cajetan d'Armagh. In 1901, he married Maria Demers at Berthierville, Quebec. He was a director of the Strathcona Assurance Company and Blais Co. Ltd. Lavallée resigned his seat in the House of Commons in 1916 to run unsuccessfully for a seat in the Legislative Assembly of Quebec.

== Electoral history ==
1911 Canadian federal election
Party	Candidate	Votes
Conservative	Joseph Octave Lavallée	1,742
Liberal	Onésiphore-Ernest Talbot	1,696
