= Louis-Honoré Fréchette =

Canadian politician and writer (1839–1908)

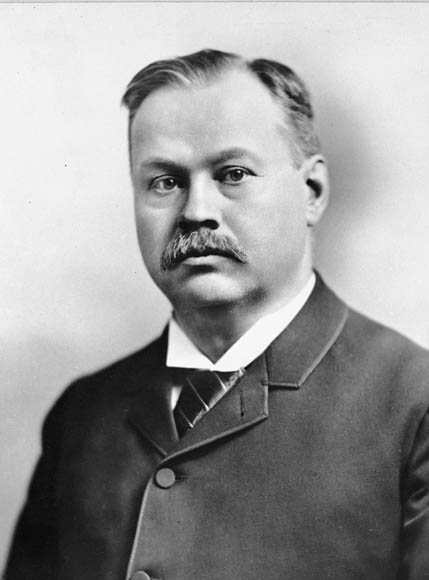
- Fréchette in 1900
- Born: November 16, 1839; Lévis, Lower Canada
- Died: May 31, 1908 (aged 68)
- Occupations: poet, playwright, short story writer
- Writing career
- Notable awards: Prix Montyon, CMG

Louis-Honoré Fréchette CMG (French pronunciation: [lwi ɔnɔʁe fʁeʃɛt]; November 16, 1839 – May 31, 1908) was a Canadian poet, politician, playwright and short story writer. For his prose, he would be the first Quebecois to receive the Prix Montyon from the Académie française, and the first Canadian to receive any honor from a European nation.

== Early life and education ==
Fréchette was born on November 16, 1839, in Lévis, Lower Canada. From 1854 to 1860, Fréchette did his classical studies at the Séminaire de Québec, the Collège de Sainte-Anne-de-la-Pocatière and at the Séminaire de Nicolet. Fréchette first showed his rebelliousness when he studied at college. He later studied law at Université Laval.

== Career ==
In 1864, he opened a lawyer's office in Lévis and founded two newspapers: Le drapeau de Lévis and La Tribune de Levis. He exiled himself to Chicago, where he wrote La voix d'un exilé. A number of plays which he wrote during that period were lost in the Great Chicago Fire.

Fréchette returned to Quebec in 1871, where he was a Liberal candidate for Lévis in the provincial elections that year; he was not elected. However, in 1874, he was elected a Member of Parliament in Ottawa. He served in the House of Commons of Canada from 1874 to 1878 as a Liberal Party of Canada member from Lévis. He was not re-elected in 1878. After that, he moved to Montreal, where he began writing full-time, having inherited his aunt's wealth when she died.

He was the first Quebecer to receive the Montyon Prize of the Académie française for his collection of poems Les Fleurs boréales, les oiseaux de neige (1879).

In 1881, Queen's College, Kingston, honored him with LLD. In that same year, Fréchette would meet Mark Twain in Montreal, whose writing he had much admired; indeed, the two would remain friends, exchanging works and favorite books. In the following year, Twain would toast Fréchette at an American welcoming banquet in Holyoke, joking about his regard for the translation of works that, in his fictitious "translation his [Fréchette's] pathetic poems have naturally become humorous, his humorous poems have become sad. Anybody who knows even the rudiments of arithmetic will know that Monsieur Fréchette's poems are now worth exactly twice as much as they were before." In 1897, Fréchette was made a Companion of the Order of St Michael and St George. After he died in 1908, he was entombed at the Notre Dame des Neiges Cemetery in Montreal.

Canada Post issued a postage stamp in his honour on July 7, 1989.

In 1991, Louis Honoré Fréchette Public School, a French immersion school, opened in Thornhill, Ontario.

== Electoral record ==
1872 Canadian federal election: Lévis
Party	Candidate	Votes
Liberal–Conservative	Joseph-Goderic Blanchet	1,564
Independent	Louis-Honoré Fréchette	1,475
Source: Canadian Elections Database

1874 Canadian federal election: Lévis
Party	Candidate	Votes
Liberal	Louis-Honoré Fréchette	1,670
Independent	J. Chabot	1,572
Source: lop.parl.ca

1878 Canadian federal election: Lévis
Party	Candidate	Votes
Liberal–Conservative	Joseph-Goderic Blanchet	2,144
Liberal	Louis-Honoré Fréchette	2,026

== Notable works ==
=== Poetry ===
- La voix d'un exilé (1866)
- La découverte du Mississippi (1873)
- Pêle-mêle (1877)
- La Légende d'un peuple (1877)
- Poésies choisies (1879)
- Les Fleurs boréales, les oiseaux de neige (1879)
- Quebec (1887)

=== Short stories ===
- L'Iroquoise du lac Saint-Pierre (1861)
- Originaux et détraqués (1892), based on real life characters
- Les contes de Jos Violon
- Christmas in French Canada (1899)

=== Plays ===
- Le retour de l'exilé (1880)
- Papineau (1880)
- Félix Poutré (1892)

== Archives ==
There is a Louis-Honoré Fréchette fonds at Library and Archives Canada. Archival reference number is R8032. There is also a Louis-Honoré Fréchette fonds at Bibliothèque et Archives nationales du Québec.

== Bibliography ==
- W. H. New, ed. Encyclopedia of Literature in Canada. Toronto: University of Toronto Press, 2002: 395–97.

Professional and academic associations
Preceded by William Robinson Clark	President of the Royal Society of Canada; 1900–1901	Succeeded by James Loudon
