= Ovide Laflamme =

Canadian politician (1925–1993)

- Official 1973 portrait

Member of Parliament for Bellechasse
- In office September 1955 – March 1958
- Preceded by: Louis-Philippe Picard
- Succeeded by: Noel Dorion

Member of Parliament for Québec—Montmorency
- In office November 1965 – June 1968
- Preceded by: Guy Marcoux
- Succeeded by: District abolished

Member of Parliament for Montmorency
- In office June 1968 – May 1974
- Preceded by: District established
- Succeeded by: Louis Duclos

Personal details
- Born: 10 December 1925 Saint-Damien-de-Buckland
- Died: 29 June 1993 (aged 67)
- Party: Liberal
- Profession: judge, lawyer

Ovide Laflamme (10 December 1925 – 29 June 1993) was a Liberal party member of the House of Commons of Canada. He was born in Saint-Damien, Quebec and became a judge and lawyer by career.

He was first elected at the Bellechasse riding in a 26 September 1955 by-election, then re-elected in the 1957 federal election. After serving his term in the 23rd Canadian Parliament, Laflamme was defeated at Bellechasse in the 1958 by Noël Dorion of the Progressive Conservative party and in the 1962 election by Bernard Dumont of the Social Credit party.

In the 1963 election, Laflamme campaigned at the Québec—Montmorency riding but was again unsuccessful having lost to Guy Marcoux of the Social Credit party. He won Québec—Montmorency in the 1965 election, and was re-elected at the Montmorency riding in the 1968 and 1972 federal elections. After completing his term in May 1974 for the 29th Canadian Parliament, Laflamme left federal office without contesting another federal election.

1968 Canadian federal election: Montmorency
Party	Candidate	Votes
Liberal	Ovide Laflamme	17,327
Ralliement créditiste	Jean-Marie McNicoll	16,114
Progressive Conservative	Roland Lortie	6,555
New Democratic	Lucille Morin	775
Independent	Paul-Henri Dufresne	649

1972 Canadian federal election: Montmorency
Party	Candidate	Votes
Liberal	Ovide Laflamme	24,250
Social Credit	René Lindsay	15,126
Progressive Conservative	Bernard Lapointe	5,904
Independent	Raymond Lavoie	4,845
New Democratic	Étienne Tremblay	2,215
