= Télesphore Fournier =

Canadian politician and lawyer (1823–1896)

The Honourable Télesphore Fournier PC
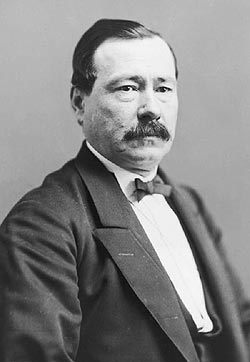
- The Honourable Mr. Justice Télesphore Fournier

Puisne Justice of the Supreme Court of Canada
- In office October 8, 1875 – September 12, 1895
- Nominated by: Alexander Mackenzie
- Preceded by: None (new position)
- Succeeded by: Désiré Girouard

Member of the Canadian Parliament for Bellechasse
- In office August 15, 1870 – October 7, 1875
- Preceded by: Napoléon Casault
- Succeeded by: Joseph-Goderic Blanchet

Member of the Legislative Assembly of Quebec for Montmagny
- In office July 1871 – November 1873
- Preceded by: Louis-Henri Blais
- Succeeded by: François Langelier

Personal details
- Born: August 5, 1823 Saint-François-de-la-Rivière-du-Sud, Lower Canada
- Died: May 10, 1896 (aged 72) Ottawa, Ontario
- Party: Liberal
- Other political affiliations: Quebec Liberal Party
- Spouse: Hermine Demers
- Children: Nine
- Cabinet: Minister of Inland Revenue (1873–1874); Minister of Justice and Attorney General of Canada (1874–1875); Postmaster General (1875)

Télesphore Fournier, PC (August 5, 1823 – May 10, 1896) was a Canadian politician, lawyer, and justice of the Supreme Court of Canada.

Born in Saint-François-de-la-Rivière-du-Sud, Lower Canada, Fournier read law in the early 1840s and was called to the bar in 1846. He was acclaimed to the House of Commons of Canada in 1870 and served in the cabinet of Prime Minister Alexander Mackenzie as Minister of Inland Revenue, Justice and Attorney General, Postmaster General.

In 1875, Mackenzie appointed Fournier as one of the first six justices of the newly established Supreme Court of Canada. He served on the Court for 19 years until his retirement in 1895 and died less than a year later, in 1896.

== Early life ==
Born in Saint-François-de-la-Rivière-du-Sud, Lower Canada (now Quebec), the son of Guillaume Fournier and Marie-Archange Morin, he was called to the bar in 1846.

From 1855 to 1859, he was the co-owner and co-editor of the newspaper, Le National de Québec.

== Political career ==
In an 1870 by-election, he was acclaimed as a Liberal Member of Parliament in the riding of Bellechasse. He was re-elected in 1872, 1873, and 1875. He held three ministerial positions: Minister of Inland Revenue (1873–1874), Minister of Justice and Attorney General of Canada (1874–1875), and Postmaster General (1875). He tabled the bill to create the Supreme Court of Canada in February 1875.

At that period of time, it was possible to be a Member of Parliament and a Member of the Legislative Assembly of the Province of Quebec (pre-1968 designation of the (Quebec National Assembly) (MLA). He was an MLA in the riding of Montmagny from 1871 to 1873.

During the 1874 federal election, Alexander Mackenzie's Liberals included the creation of a central court of appeal as part of their campaign platform. Upon taking power, the Mackenzie government reiterated this commitment in the throne speech of 1874. As Minister of Justice, Fournier introduced a new Supreme Court Bill to Parliament in February 1875. On April 8, 1875, with bipartisan support, Parliament passed The Supreme and Exchequer Court Act, (Note: The Supreme and Exchequer Court Act, S.C. 1875, c. 11) simultaneously establishing both the Supreme Court and the Exchequer Court.

== Justice of the Supreme Court of Canada ==
On September 30, 1875, Fournier was one of the six original appointments to the Supreme Court of Canada by Prime Minister Alexander Mackenzie. Fournier was sworn in by Chief Justice William Buell Richards on November 8, 1875. Along with Jean-Thomas Taschereau, Fournier was one of the two justices appointed under Supreme Court Act, 1875, that were allocated to justices from Quebec in recognition of the province's unique civil law system.

In 1894, the Conservative government sought to reshape the Supreme Court of Canada which was growing in age and as a consequence, many justices like Fournier were regularly absent from sittings due to health reasons. The House of Commons passed a motion targeting Fournier and John Wellington Gwynne, allowing any justice of the Supreme Court who reached the age of 70 with at least 15 years of judicial service and five years on the Supreme Court to retire with a lifetime pension equal to their salary. However, neither justice resigned. Justice Minister Charles Tupper wrote Chief Justice Samuel Henry Strong to inform him that he would ask Gwynne and Fournier to retire, or face a bill in Parliament to compel their retirements. Fournier agreed to retire after a leave of absence on September 12, 1895, and was replaced on the Court by Désiré Girouard, a Conservative Member of Parliament and mayor of Dorval, Quebec.

Historian Ian Bushnell notes that the Supreme Court Reports did not translate the decisions, and Fournier normally wrote in French, meaning his legal abilities were likely unknown in English Canada.

== Later life ==
Fournier died shortly after his retirement from Bright's disease on May 10, 1896, at the age of 72.

== Family and personal life ==
He married Hermine-Eloïse Demers on July 22, 1857. They had nine children: seven daughters and two sons. Hermine-Eloïse died in 1879, only four years after the family moved to Ottawa for Fournier's appointment to the Supreme Court. After her death, his eldest daughter took over household responsibilities. The house in which he lived from 1877 to 1882 now serves as the Embassy of the Republic of Croatia in Ottawa.

== Electoral record ==
Canadian federal by-election, 27 May 1870: Bellechasse Casault appointed Puisne Judge of the Superior Court of Quebec
Party	Candidate	Votes
Liberal	Télesphore Fournier	acclaimed

1872 Canadian federal election: Bellechasse
Party	Candidate	Votes
Liberal	Télesphore Fournier	1,219
Conservative	Adolphe-Philippe Caron	638
Source: Canadian Elections Database

Canadian federal by-election, 27 November 1873: Bellechasse Ministerial by-election when Fournier was nominated Minister of Inland Revenue
Party	Candidate	Votes
Liberal	Télesphore Fournier	acclaimed

1874 Canadian federal election: Bellechasse
Party	Candidate	Votes
Liberal	Télesphore Fournier	acclaimed
Source: Parliament of Canada
