= Québec—Montmorency =

Former federal electoral district in Quebec, Canada

Quebec electoral district

Defunct federal electoral district
- Legislature: House of Commons
- District created: 1924
- District abolished: 1967
- First contested: 1925
- Last contested: 1965

Québec—Montmorency (French pronunciation: [kebɛk mɔ̃mɔʁɑ̃si]) was a federal electoral district in Quebec, Canada, that was represented in the House of Commons of Canada from 1925 to 1968.

This riding was created in 1924 from parts of Charlevoix—Montmorency and Quebec County ridings.

It was abolished in 1966 when it was redistributed into Louis-Hébert, Montmorency and Portneuf ridings.

== Members of Parliament ==
This riding elected the following members of Parliament:

Parliament	Years	Member	Party
Québec—Montmorency; Riding created from Charlevoix—Montmorency and Quebec County
15th	1925–1926	Henri-Edgar Lavigueur	Liberal
16th	1926–1930	Henri-Edgar Lavigueur	Liberal
17th	1930–1935	Charles-Napoléon Dorion	Conservative
18th	1935–1940	Wilfrid Lacroix	Liberal
19th	1940–1944	Wilfrid Lacroix	Liberal
19th	1944–1945	Wilfrid Lacroix	Independent Liberal
15th	1945–1949	Wilfrid Lacroix	Independent Liberal
16th	1949–1953	Wilfrid Lacroix	Liberal
17th	1953–1957	Wilfrid Lacroix	Liberal
18th	1957–1958	Wilfrid Lacroix	Liberal
19th	1958–1962	Robert Lafrenière	Progressive Conservative
20th	1962–1963	Guy Marcoux	Social Credit
21st	1963–1965	Guy Marcoux	Social Credit
22nd	1965–1968	Ovide Laflamme	Liberal
Riding dissolved into Louis-Hébert, Montmorency and Portneuf

== Election results ==
1925 Canadian federal election
Party	Candidate	Votes
Liberal	Henri-Edgar Lavigueur	7,194
Conservative	Charles-Auguste Chauveau	5,250

1926 Canadian federal election
Party	Candidate	Votes
Liberal	Henri-Edgar Lavigueur	6,433
Conservative	Charles-Napoléon Dorion	5,267

1930 Canadian federal election
Party	Candidate	Votes
Conservative	Charles-Napoléon Dorion	7,212
Liberal	Henri-Edgar Lavigueur	7,165
Independent	François-Xavier Galibois	150

1935 Canadian federal election
Party	Candidate	Votes
Liberal	Wilfrid Lacroix	9,084
Conservative	Charles-Napoléon Dorion	8,064

1940 Canadian federal election
Party	Candidate	Votes
Liberal	Wilfrid Lacroix	12,850
National Government	Pierre Audet	5,175

1945 Canadian federal election
Party	Candidate	Votes
Independent Liberal	Wilfrid Lacroix	11,561
Progressive Conservative	Saül Garneau	5,642
Social Credit	Adélard Bélair	5,211

1949 Canadian federal election
Party	Candidate	Votes
Liberal	Wilfrid Lacroix	16,829
Progressive Conservative	René De Blois	7,071
Union des électeurs	Paul-Eugène Drolet	1,849

1953 Canadian federal election
Party	Candidate	Votes
Liberal	Wilfrid Lacroix	18,029
Progressive Conservative	René Gobeil	12,272

1957 Canadian federal election
Party	Candidate	Votes
Liberal	Wilfrid Lacroix	24,964
Progressive Conservative	Robert Lafrenière	14,121

1958 Canadian federal election
Party	Candidate	Votes
Progressive Conservative	Robert Lafrenière	25,394
Liberal	Wilfrid Lacroix	19,610
Social Credit	Raoul Robillard	1,109

1962 Canadian federal election
Party	Candidate	Votes
Social Credit	Guy Marcoux	35,499
Liberal	Gérard Coté	15,460
Progressive Conservative	Robert Lafrenière	9,318
Independent	Rolland Coderre	480

1963 Canadian federal election
Party	Candidate	Votes
Social Credit	Guy Marcoux	28,147
Liberal	Ovide Laflamme	25,091
Progressive Conservative	Paul-E. Blondeau	5,555
New Democratic	G. Raymond Laliberté	3,282

1965 Canadian federal election
Party	Candidate	Votes
Liberal	Ovide Laflamme	30,084
Ralliement créditiste	Henri Borgia	14,720
New Democratic	René Gobeil	7,709
Independent	Guy Marcoux	7,117
Progressive Conservative	André Asselin	5,811

== See also ==
- List of Canadian electoral districts
- Historical federal electoral districts of Canada
