= François Langlois =

Canadian politician (born 1948)

François Langlois (French pronunciation: [fʁɑ̃swa lɑ̃ɡlwa]; born 6 January 1948) is a Canadian former politician who served in the House of Commons of Canada from 1993 to 1997. He is a lawyer by career.

Born in Sainte-Claire, Quebec, he was elected in the Bellechasse electoral district under the Bloc Québécois (BQ) party in the 1993 federal election, thus serving in the 35th Canadian Parliament.

Due to restructuring of electoral districts, Langlois would be a candidate in the Bellechasse—Etchemins—Montmagny—L'Islet riding in the 1997 federal election but lost to Liberal Gilbert Normand. Langlois also failed to unseat Normand in the 2000 federal election. Langlois made no further attempts to re-enter Canadian politics since then.
