= Kevin Garant =

Kevin Laurent Garant
- Born: October 1, 1963 (age 61); Boston, Massachusetts, United States
- Origin: Melbourne, Australia
- Instrument: Guitar
- Years active: 1981–present

Kevin Laurent Garant (born October 1, 1963 in Boston, Massachusetts) is a guitarist, composer and sound designer.

Garant has worked with numerous people and groups including Sting to Afrika Bambaataa from Hall & Oates to Vanilla Ice, world tours with Amnesty International to "Weird Al" Yankovic and Ben Stiller’s MTV shows.

Relocating from New York City to Melbourne, Australia in 1994, Garant formed the Largest Living Things with ex-Crowded House and Split Enz drummer/vocalist Paul Hester.

The Largest Living Things performed throughout Australia and had their own television series on the ABC "Hessie’s Shed" which broadcast in Australia, New Zealand, the UK and on MTV in Europe.

The Largest Living Things were also the house band on the short lived Mick Molloy Show on the Nine Network in Australia.

Garant has worked with Paul Kelly, Neil Finn Mandawuy Yunupingu (Yothu Yindi), Rob Hirst, Archie Roach, Ruby Hunter, Stephen Cummings, Colin Hay, Deb Conway, Mick Thomas Ross Hanaford, Renne Geyer, Dan Warner Kutcha Edwards, Fernando Saunders, Jon Langford and Ross Wilson.

As a producer Garant has worked with such diverse artists as "Kingston Trio" founder and folk music legend David Guard, to Australian Indigenous artists Kutcha Edwards and Manuel Nulupani Dhurrkay from "Saltwater" band and hip hop artist Meriiki Hood.

Garant has composed television and film scores.

As a sound designer, Garant was nominated for a Monitor Award.

== Awards ==
Sound Design for film soundtracks for Largo Desolato: written by Václav Havel starring F. Murray Abraham, Academy Award winner for Best Foreign Film “Cinema Paradiso”, Hamlet” starring Kevin Kline, “Necessary Parties” starring Allan Arkin, The Tall Guy starring Jeff Goldblum, Color Museum directed by George Wolf and “ Dirtiest Dozen of Comedy “featuring Tim Allen, Chris Rock and Bill Hicks.
