= Frédéric Dorion =

Canadian politician

Frédéric Dorion (August 23, 1898 – July 15, 1981) was a Quebec politician and chief justice. He led a group of Independent MPs in the House of Commons of Canada who were opposed to the implementation of conscription during World War II.

== Early life ==
Dorion studied at Laval University but left in order to enlist in the Royal Flying Corps during World War I. He joined his family's law firm in Quebec City after the war and was an organizer for the Conservative Party in Quebec during the 1930s. His brother, Charles Napoléon Dorion, would go on to be a Conservative MP from 1930 to 1935. Another brother, Noël Dorion, would also lead a political career as a Progressive Conservative MP from 1958 to 1962.

== Political career ==
He was adamantly opposed to conscription during the World War II conscription crisis. Dorion ran as an independent anti-conscription candidate in a November 30, 1942 by-election in Charlevoix—Saguenay defeating Thérèse Casgrain. In October 1944, Dorion and fellow Independent MP Sasseville Roy formed the "Independent Group" (Le groupement des Independants), a loose political party of independent anti-conscription MPs with Dorion as leader. Three other anti-conscription Quebec MPs soon joined: Liguori Lacombe, Wilfrid Lacroix, and Emmanuel D'Anjou. Roy described the party as opposed to the imperialism of the Liberal and Progressive Conservative parties and as looking after the interests of Quebec residents in Ottawa. Dorion, in turn, accused William Lyon Mackenzie King's Liberals of being in a "secret union" with the communist Labor-Progressive Party.

The Bloc populaire's entry into provincial politics antagonized Quebec Premier Maurice Duplessis, leader of the Union Nationale, who henceforth transferred his party's federal support to Dorion and his followers in the 1945 federal election.

After a failed attempt to launch a new political party led by Arthur Cardin, King's former Public Works minister who crossed the floor in 1942 to oppose the government's conscription policy, Dorion was re-elected as an independent in 1945.

In 1949, Dorion spoke out against the extradition from Canada of Count Jacques Charles Noel Duge de Bernonville, a Vichy France police official who had been an aide to Gestapo chief Klaus Barbie and was wanted in France for having collaborated with the Nazis. Dorion represented the Count in his court proceedings and also told the House of Commons, "I am sure that if it had been Communist Jews who had come here instead of French Catholics we would not have heard a word about them."

Dorion announced he was joining the Progressive Conservative party on May 4, 1949, as that year's election campaign opened and led the party's campaign in the Quebec City area. He was defeated in the 1949 election and again in the 1953 election running both times as a Progressive Conservative.

Dorion was appointed to the bench and became chief justice of the Quebec Superior Court in 1963 and served in that position for a decade.

He is best known for writing the 1965 Dorion Report on federal government corruption after being appointed to lead a commission of inquiry into alleged bribery and coercion by ministerial assistants in the federal government known as the Rivard Affair.

== See also ==
- Bloc populaire canadien
