= Wilfrid Lacroix =

Canadian politician (1891–1970)

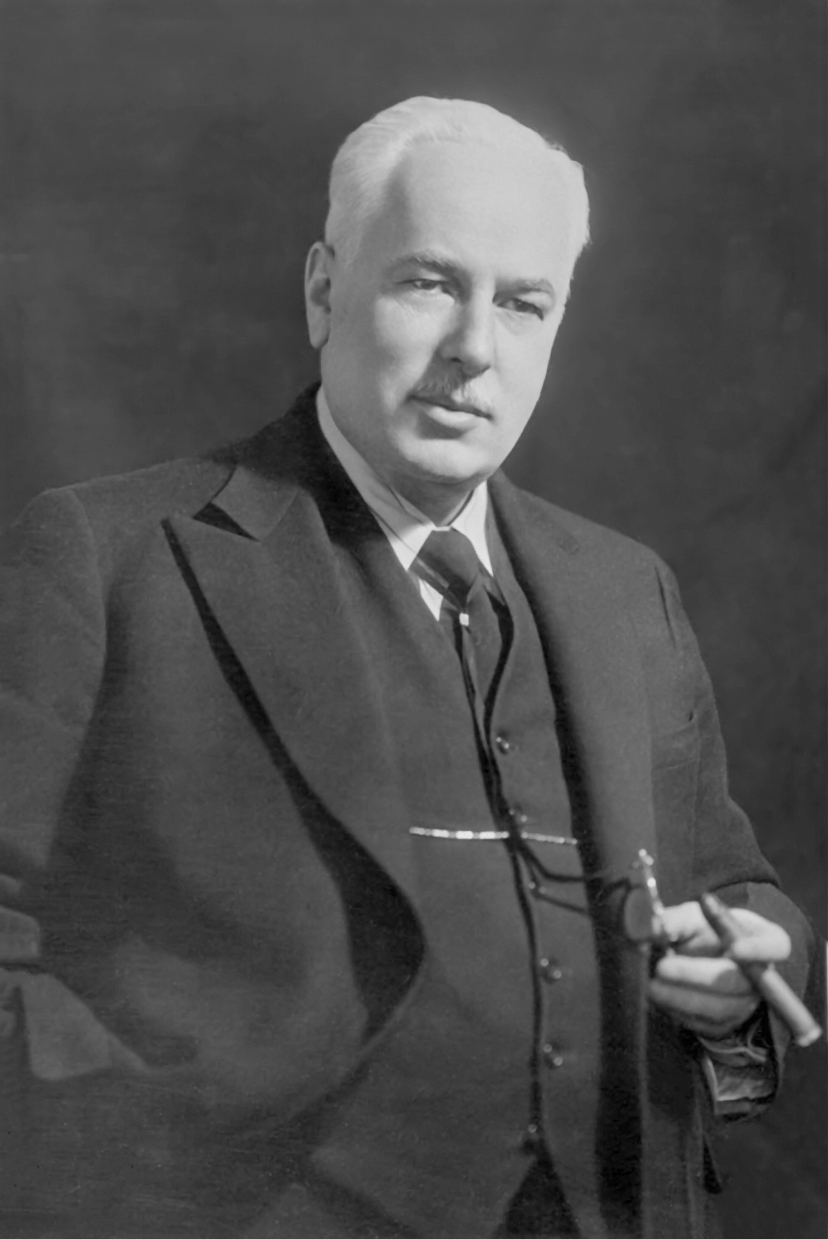

Member of Parliament for Québec—Montmorency
- In office October 14, 1935 – March 30, 1958
- Preceded by: Charles-Napoléon Dorion
- Succeeded by: Robert Lafrenière

Personal details
- Born: 6 March 1891 Quebec City, Quebec
- Died: 30 August 1970 (aged 79) Quebec City, Quebec
- Party: Liberal; Independent Liberal
- Profession: architect

Wilfrid Lacroix (6 March 1891 – 30 August 1970) was a member of the House of Commons of Canada from 1935 to 1958. His affiliation was mostly with the Liberal party except between 1944 and 1949 when he left the party to act as an "Independent Liberal" member.

Lacroix was born in Quebec City, Quebec and worked as an architect in the early 20th century. His projects included the Gérard-Morisset Building of the Musée national des beaux-arts du Québec which was designed in the Beaux-Arts style and opened in 1933 as the Quebec Provincial Museum.

He was first elected at the Québec—Montmorency riding in the 1935 general election and was re-elected for successive terms in 1940 federal election, 1945 federal election, 1949 federal election, 1953 federal election and 1957 federal election. Lacroix was defeated by Robert Lafrenière of the Progressive Conservative party in the 1958 election.

On 30 January 1939, Lacroix presented to the House of Commons a petition of 127,364 signatures collected by the Saint-Jean-Baptiste Society "vigorously protesting against all immigration what so ever and especially Jewish immigration". On 10 September that year, as Parliament met to declare war on Germany and join World War II, Lacroix and fellow Quebec Liberal member Liguori Lacombe introduced an amendment for "non-participation" in the war, reflecting some reluctance in French Canada to join Britain in war. The two members were condemned in a Globe and Mail editorial the following day as "two French-Canadians who gained eternal distinction by an attitude unworthy of their people and country."

On 24 November 1944, Lacroix and three other Quebec Liberal members left their party to protest the enactment of conscription. Lacroix joined the "Independent Group" of opposition anti-conscription MPs led by Frédéric Dorion. As Lacroix moved to the opposition side of the House of Commons, he shouted "Trahison!" ("Treason") at Prime Minister William Lyon Mackenzie King. Lacroix was re-elected in the 1945 federal election and until June 1949, sat in the House of Commons as an "Independent Liberal". On three occasions, he introduced legislation which attempted to outlaw the Communist party, and the associated Labor-Progressive Party. He returned to the Liberal party by the 1949 federal election and remained a party member until his House of Commons career ended in 1958.

Lacroix died in Quebec City on 30 August 1970.
