= Bellechasse County =

County of Quebec, Canada

Coordinates: 46°40′N 70°45′W

Bellechasse County was a county of Quebec, Canada during the 19th and 20th centuries. Part or all of it was within the Bellechasse federal electoral district from 1882 to 1987.

Among places the county included were the Township of Armagh, the seigneuries of Lauzon and Joliette in the municipality of Honfleur, and the township of Langevin et Ware.

In 2008, the county was disincorporated.
