= Charles Alphonse Fournier =

Canadian politician

Charles-Alphonse Fournier (November 1, 1871 – October 13, 1941) was a pharmacist and political figure in Quebec. He represented Bellechasse in the House of Commons of Canada from 1917 to 1926 as a Liberal.

He was born in St-Charles de Bellechasse, Quebec, the son of Joseph Fournier and Delina Turgeon, and was educated at the Seminaire de Quebec. Fournier moved to the United States in 1892, becoming a druggist in Fitchburg, Massachusetts. In 1897, he married Ella Mae Eagles. In 1908, he moved to St-Charles de Bellechasse, where he was employed as a druggist. He did not run for reelection to the House of Commons in 1926. Fournier died in Quebec City at the age of 69.
