= Adrien Lambert =

Canadian politician (1913–2003)

Member of the Canadian Parliament for Bellechasse
- In office 1968–1980
- Preceded by: Herman Laverdière
- Succeeded by: Alain Garant

Personal details
- Born: Joseph Adrien Henri Lambert; 13 July 1913; Saint-Adrien-d'Irlande, Quebec, Canada
- Died: 23 July 2003 (aged 90)
- Political party: Social Credit Party of Canada

Joseph Adrien Henri Lambert (15 July 1913 – 23 July 2003) was a Canadian farmer and politician. Lambert was a Social Credit Party of Canada member of the House of Commons of Canada. He was born in Saint-Adrien-d'Irlande, Quebec and became a farmer by career.

Lambert was defeated in early attempts to win the Lotbinière electoral district as an independent candidate in the 1949 Canadian federal election and the 1965 Canadian federal election.

He won the Bellechasse electoral district in the 1968 federal election, initially as a Ralliement créditiste candidate. His party rejoined the Social Credit Party of Canada in 1971, under which he was re-elected at Bellechasse in 1972, 1974 and 1979.

Lambert served successive terms from the 28th to 31st Canadian Parliaments after which he was defeated by Alain Garant of the Liberal party in the 1980 federal election.

== Electoral record (partial) ==
1980 Canadian federal election: Bellechasse
| Party | Candidate | Votes | % | ±% |
|---|---|---|---|---|
| Liberal | Alain Garant | 20,636 | 51.13 | +7.48 |
| Social Credit | Adrien Lambert | 15,124 | 37.47 | −8.96 |
| Progressive Conservative | Jean Deschênes | 2,912 | 7.22 | −0.04 |
| Rhinoceros | Andrée Chabot | 815 | 2.02 | +0.72 |
| New Democratic | Napoléon Goupil | 730 | 1.81 | +0.93 |
| Union populaire | France Théberge | 141 | 0.35 | −0.13 |
| Total valid votes | | 40,358 | 100.00 | |
| Total rejected ballots | | 274 | | |
| Turnout | | 40,632 | 70.86 | −1.31 |
| Electors on the lists | | 57,339 | | |
Source: Report of the Chief Electoral Officer, Thirty-second General Election, 1980.
lop.parl.ca

1979 Canadian federal election: Bellechasse
| Party | Candidate | Votes | % | ±% |
|---|---|---|---|---|
| Social Credit | Adrien Lambert | 18,702 | 46.43 | |
| Liberal | Jean Richard | 17,584 | 43.65 | |
| Progressive Conservative | Jean Deschênes | 2,924 | 7.26 | |
| Rhinoceros | Marie Claude Chênevert | 523 | 1.30 | – |
| New Democratic | Guy Dupuis | 354 | 0.88 | |
| Union populaire | Jean Beaudoin | 195 | 0.48 | |
| Total valid votes | | 40,282 | 100.00 | |
| Total rejected ballots | | 360 | | |
| Turnout | | 40,642 | 72.17 | |
| Electors on the lists | | 56,317 | | |
Source: Report of the Chief Electoral Officer, Thirty-first General Election, 1979.
