= Gilbert Normand =

Canadian politician (1943–2025)

Gilbert Normand, PC (31 March 1943 – 1 January 2025) was a Canadian physician and politician in Quebec, Canada.

Normand was a member of the Quebec College of Physicians from 1970, and was a practising physician for twenty-seven years, including two decades as a general practitioner doctor-physician in private practice.

In the 1997 general election, Normand ran and won a seat in the House of Commons of Canada as Liberal Member of Parliament for Bellechasse—Etchemins—Montmagny—L'Islet. Prime Minister Jean Chrétien appointed him Secretary of State for Agriculture, Agri-food, Fisheries and Oceans soon after the election. In 1999, he became Secretary of State for Science, Research and Development. He retained his seat in the 2000 federal election, but left his position as a Secretary of State in 2002 to become a backbencher. He was not a candidate in the 2004 federal election.

In 2005, Normand was appointed medical director of EPIDERMA, Quebec's largest laser hair removal network.

Normand died on 1 January 2025, aged 81.

26th Canadian Ministry (1993–2003) – Cabinet of Jean Chrétien
Sub-Cabinet Posts (2)
| Predecessor | Title | Successor |
| | Secretary of State (Science, Research and Development) (1999–2002) | Maurizio Bevilacqua |
| Fernand Robichaud | Secretary of State (Agriculture and Agri-Food) (Fisheries and Oceans) (1997–1999) | |
Parliament of Canada
| Preceded by The electoral district was created in 1996. | Member of Parliament for Bellechasse—Etchemins—Montmagny—L'Islet; 1997–2004 | Succeeded by The electoral district was abolished in 2003. |
