= Charles-Napoléon Dorion =

Canadian politician

- Dorion c. 1950

Member of Parliament for Québec—Montmorency
- In office July 1930 – October 1935
- Preceded by: Henri-Edgar Lavigueur
- Succeeded by: Wilfrid Lacroix

Personal details
- Born: 13 August 1887 Rivière-du-Loup, Quebec
- Died: 3 December 1978 (aged 91) Courville, Quebec
- Party: Conservative
- Relations: Frédéric Dorion (brother); Noël Dorion (brother)
- Profession: lawyer

Charles-Napoléon Dorion, QC (13 August 1887 – 3 December 1978) was a Quebec lawyer and politician.

He was born in Rivière-du-Loup, Quebec and admitted to the Quebec bar in July 1914. He practiced law in Quebec City with his brothers Frédéric Dorion and Noël Dorion as well as with Lucien Lacasse. Dorion was appointed King's Counsel in 1934.

In his political life he was mayor of Courville, Quebec from 1926 to 1934. He first ran as a Conservative candidate in Québec—Montmorency in the 1926 federal election but was defeated. He was elected on his second attempt in 1930 and served in the House of Commons of Canada for five years before being defeated in the 1935 federal election. In 1940, he was elected president of the Law Society of Quebec.

His brothers Frédéric and Noël also served as Members of Parliament at various times.
