= Robert Lafrenière =

Canadian politician (1924–2012)

Robert B. Lafrenière
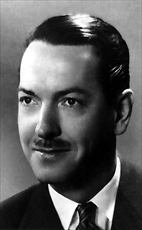

Member of Parliament for Québec—Montmorency
- In office March 1958 – June 1962
- Preceded by: Wilfrid Lacroix
- Succeeded by: Guy Marcoux

Personal details
- Born: 7 March 1924 Maskinongé, Quebec
- Died: 27 November 2012 (aged 88) Quebec City, Quebec
- Party: Progressive Conservative
- Profession: Lawyer

Robert B. Lafrenière (7 March 1924 – 27 November 2012) was a Progressive Conservative party member of the House of Commons of Canada. He was a lawyer by career.

After an unsuccessful bid for the Parliamentary seat at Québec—Montmorency in the 1957 federal election, Lafrenière won the riding from Liberal party incumbent Wilfrid Lacroix in the 1958 election. Lafrenière served one term, the 24th Canadian Parliament, before his defeat in the 1962 election by Guy Marcoux of the Liberals.

Lafrenière made two more unsuccessful attempts to return to the House of Commons, first in the 1965 election at Montmagny—L'Islet, then in the 1979 election at Charlesbourg.
