= Alain Garant =

Canadian politician

Member of Parliament for Bellechasse
- In office 1980–1984
- Preceded by: Adrien Lambert
- Succeeded by: Pierre Blais

Personal details
- Born: 21 March 1952 (age 74) Montmagny, Quebec
- Party: Liberal party
- Profession: Accountant

Alain Garant (born 21 March 1952) was a Liberal party member of the House of Commons of Canada. He was a Chartered Accountant by career.

Garant won the Bellechasse, Quebec electoral district in the 1980 federal election, beating incumbent Adrien Lambert. He served in the 32nd Canadian Parliament and left national politics after his defeat in that riding in the 1984 election.

== Electoral record (partial) ==
1980 Canadian federal election: Bellechasse
Party	Candidate	Votes	%	±%
Liberal	Alain Garant	20,636	51.13	+7.48
Social Credit	Adrien Lambert	15,124	37.47	−8.96
Progressive Conservative	Jean Deschênes	2,912	7.22	−0.04
Rhinoceros	Andrée Chabot	815	2.02	+0.72
New Democratic	Napoléon Goupil	730	1.81	+0.93
Union populaire	France Théberge	141	0.35	−0.13
Total valid votes		40,358	100.00	
Total rejected ballots		274		
Turnout		40,632	70.86	−1.31
Electors on the lists		57,339		
Source: Report of the Chief Electoral Officer, Thirty-second General Election, 1980.
lop.parl.ca
