= Achille Larue =

Canadian politician (1849–1922)

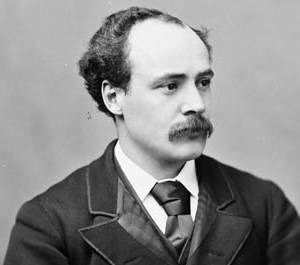

Member of the Canadian Parliament for Bellechasse
- In office 1878–1881
- Preceded by: Joseph-Goderic Blanchet
- Succeeded by: Guillaume Amyot

Personal details
- Born: October 27, 1849 St-Jean, Île-d'Orléans, Canada East
- Died: May 1, 1922 (aged 72)
- Party: Liberal

Achille Larue (October 27, 1849 – May 1, 1922) was a lawyer and political figure in Quebec. He represented Bellechasse in the House of Commons of Canada from 1878 to 1881 as a Liberal member.

He was born in St-Jean, Île d'Orléans, Canada East, the son of Nazaire La Rue and Adelaide Roy. Larue was educated at the Séminaire de Quebec and the Université Laval. He was admitted to the Quebec bar in 1872 and set up practice in Quebec City. Larue was an unsuccessful candidate for a seat in the House of Commons in an 1875 by-election. He was elected in the 1878 federal election; his election was overturned in 1881 after an appeal. He was president of Le Club Canadien. Larue died in Quebec City at the age of 72.
