= Herman Laverdière =

Canadian politician

Herman E. Laverdière
- Official 1966 portrait

Member of Parliament for Bellechasse
- In office April 1963 – April 1968

Personal details
- Born: 13 March 1927 Saint-Lazare-de-Bellechasse, Quebec, Canada
- Died: 21 May 2001 (aged 74) Lévis, Quebec, Canada
- Party: Liberal
- Profession: teacher

Herman E. Laverdière (13 March 1927 – 21 May 2001) was a Liberal party member of the House of Commons of Canada. Born in Saint-Lazare, Quebec, he was a teacher by career.

He was first elected at the Bellechasse riding in the 1963 general election and re-elected there in 1965. After completing his second term, the 27th Canadian Parliament, Laverdière left Parliament and did not campaign in further federal elections.
