= Bellechasse (federal electoral district) =

Former federal electoral district in Quebec, Canada

Coordinates: 46°40′N 70°30′W

Quebec electoral district

Defunct federal electoral district
- Legislature: House of Commons
- District created: 1867
- District abolished: 1996
- First contested: 1867
- Last contested: 1993

Bellechasse (French pronunciation: [bɛlʃas]) was a federal electoral district in Quebec, Canada. It was represented in the House of Commons from 1867 until the 1997 election, when it became Bellechasse—Etchemins—Montmagny—L'Islet. After redistribution prior to the 2004 election, that riding became Lévis—Bellechasse. Currently, the only riding which includes the name "Bellechasse" is Bellechasse—Les Etchemins—Lévis.

== Description ==
In 1867, Bellechasse was defined to consist of the Parishes of St. Valier, Saint Raphael, Saint Michel, Beaumont, Saint Charles, Saint Gervais, Saint Lazare, the south-west part of the Township of Armagh, the north-east part of the Township of Buckland, and the Townships of Mailloux, Roux, Bellechasse and Daaquam.

In 1882, the north-eastern part of the Township of Armagh in the County of Bellechasse, and the north-east part of the township of Mailloux were detached from Bellechasse and annexed to Montmagny.

In 1924, Bellechasse was re-defined to consist of the County of Bellechasse, except for the seigneuries of Lauzon and Joliette in the municipality of Honfleur, and the townships of Langevin and Ware in the municipality of Sainte-Sabine.

In 1933, Bellechasse was re-defined to consist of the county of Bellechasse (except the seigniories of Lauzon and Joliette, and the township of Langevin et Ware), the municipalities of Rivière-Boyer, St-Henri-de-Lauzon, St-Jean-Chrysostôme, and St-Henri Village in the county of Lévis, the parish municipality of St-Luc-de-Dijon in the county of Dorchester, and the municipalities of Berthier and St-François-de-la-Rivière-du-Sud in the county of Montmagny.

In 1947, Bellechasse was re-defined to consist of the county of Bellechasse, the municipalities of Rivière-Boyer, St. Henri-de-Lauzon and the village of St. Henri in the county of Lévis, the municipality of St. Luc-de-Dijon the county of Dorchester, and the municipalities of Berthier and St. François-de-la-Rivière-du-Sud in the county of Montmagny.

In 1966, Bellechasse was re-defined to consist of the Town of Montmagny, the County of Bellechasse, parts of the County of Dorchester, and the County of Montmagny (except the municipality of Cap-Saint-Ignace).

In 1976, Bellechasse was re-defined to consist of the City of Montmagny, the Towns of Lac-Etchemin, L'Islet and Saint-Pamphile, the County of Montmagny, the County of L'Islet (except the parish municipality of Sainte-Louise and the municipality of Saint-Roch-des-Aulnets), parts of the Counties of Bellechasse and Dorchester.

In 1987, Bellechasse was re-defined to consist of the towns of Lac-Etchemin, L'Islet, Montmagny and Saint-Pamphile, the counties of Bellechasse and Montmagny, the County of L'Islet (excluding the Parish Municipality of Sainte-Louise), the Municipality of Saint-Rochdes-Aulnaies, and parts of the County of Dorchester.

The electoral district was abolished in 1996, and was incorporated into Bellechasse—Etchemins—Montmagny—L'Islet.

== Members of Parliament ==
This riding elected the following members of Parliament:

Parliament	Years	Member	Party
Bellechasse
1st	1867–1870	Louis-Napoléon Casault	Conservative
1st	1870–1872	Télesphore Fournier	Liberal
2nd	1872–1873	Télesphore Fournier	Liberal
2nd	1873–1874	Télesphore Fournier	Liberal
3rd	1874–1875	Télesphore Fournier	Liberal
3rd	1875–1878	Joseph-Goderic Blanchet	Conservative
4th	1878–1881	Achille Larue	Liberal
4th	1881–1882	Guillaume Amyot	Conservative
5th	1882–1887	Guillaume Amyot	Conservative
6th	1887–1891	Guillaume Amyot	Nationalist
7th	1891–1896	Guillaume Amyot	Nationalist Conservative
8th	1896–1900	Onésiphore-Ernest Talbot	Liberal
9th	1900–1904	Onésiphore-Ernest Talbot	Liberal
10th	1904–1908	Onésiphore-Ernest Talbot	Liberal
11th	1908–1911	Onésiphore-Ernest Talbot	Liberal
12th	1911–1917	Joseph-Octave Lavallée	Conservative
13th	1917–1921	Charles-Alphonse Fournier	Opposition (Laurier Liberals)
14th	1921–1925	Charles-Alphonse Fournier	Liberal
15th	1925–1926	Charles-Alphonse Fournier	Liberal
16th	1926–1930	Joseph Oscar Lefebre Boulanger	Liberal
17th	1930–1935	Joseph Oscar Lefebre Boulanger	Liberal
18th	1935–1940	Joseph Oscar Lefebre Boulanger	Liberal
19th	1940–1945	Louis-Philippe Picard	Liberal
20th	1945–1949	Louis-Philippe Picard	Liberal
21st	1949–1953	Louis-Philippe Picard	Liberal
22nd	1953–1955	Louis-Philippe Picard	Liberal
22nd	1955–1957	Ovide Laflamme	Liberal
23rd	1957–1958	Ovide Laflamme	Liberal
24th	1958–1962	Noël Dorion	Progressive Conservative
25th	1962–1963	Bernard Dumont	Social Credit
26th	1963–1965	Herman Laverdière	Liberal
27th	1965–1968	Herman Laverdière	Liberal
28th	1968–1971	Adrien Lambert	Ralliement créditiste
28th	1971–1972	Adrien Lambert	Social Credit
29th	1972–1974	Adrien Lambert	Social Credit
30th	1974–1979	Adrien Lambert	Social Credit
31st	1979–1980	Adrien Lambert	Social Credit
32nd	1980–1984	Alain Garant	Liberal
33rd	1984–1988	Pierre Blais	Progressive Conservative
34th	1988–1993	Pierre Blais	Progressive Conservative
35th	1993–1997	François Langlois	Bloc Québécois
Riding dissolved into Bellechasse—Etchemins—Montmagny—L'Islet

== Election results ==
1867 Canadian federal election
Party	Candidate	Votes
Conservative	Louis-Napoléon Casault	983
Unknown	Édouard Rémillard	671
Source: Canadian Elections Database

Canadian federal by-election, 27 May 1870 Casault appointed Puisne Judge of the Superior Court of Quebec
Party	Candidate	Votes
Liberal	Télesphore Fournier	acclaimed

1872 Canadian federal election
Party	Candidate	Votes
Liberal	Télesphore Fournier	1,219
Conservative	Adolphe-Philippe Caron	638
Source: Canadian Elections Database

Canadian federal by-election, 27 November 1873 Ministerial by-election when Fournier was nominated Minister of Inland Revenue
Party	Candidate	Votes
Liberal	Télesphore Fournier	acclaimed

1874 Canadian federal election
Party	Candidate	Votes
Liberal	Télesphore Fournier	acclaimed
Source: Parliament of Canada

By-election on 23 November 1875 Fournier appointed to the Supreme Court Bench
Party	Candidate	Votes
Conservative	Joseph Goderic Blanchet	698
Liberal	Achille Larue	443
Unknown	Pierre Boutin	359

1878 Canadian federal election
Party	Candidate	Votes
Liberal	Achille Larue	1,042
Conservative	Guillaume Amyot	990
Source: Canadian Elections Database

By-election on 19 March 1881 Election declared void
Party	Candidate	Votes
Conservative	Guillaume Amyot	1,066
Unknown	Mr. Bilodeau	1,035

1882 Canadian federal election
Party	Candidate	Votes
Conservative	Guillaume Amyot	1,186
Liberal	Ph. Ol. (alias Ernest) Pacaud	1,044

1887 Canadian federal election
Party	Candidate	Votes
Nationalist	Guillaume Amyot	1,515
Conservative	Isidore-Noël Belleau	878

1891 Canadian federal election
Party	Candidate	Votes
Nationalist Conservative	Guillaume Amyot	1,271
Conservative	Faucher de St. Maurice	1,165

1896 Canadian federal election
Party	Candidate	Votes
Liberal	Onésiphore-Ernest Talbot	1,537
Conservative	Joseph-Edmond Roy	1,227

1900 Canadian federal election
Party	Candidate	Votes
Liberal	Onésiphore-Ernest Talbot	1,701
Conservative	Joseph-Emile Gelley	1,231

1904 Canadian federal election
Party	Candidate	Votes
Liberal	Onésiphore-Ernest Talbot	1,819
Conservative	J.B. Fradette	957

1908 Canadian federal election
Party	Candidate	Votes
Liberal	Onésiphore-Ernest Talbot	1,988
Conservative	Charles Vezina	627

1911 Canadian federal election
Party	Candidate	Votes
Conservative	Joseph Octave Lavallée	1,742
Liberal	Onésiphore-Ernest Talbot	1,696

1917 Canadian federal election
Party	Candidate	Votes
Opposition (Laurier Liberals)	Charles-Alphonse Fournier	3,752
Conservative	Honoré Grenier	60
Unknown	Thomas Wilfrid Marceau	30

1921 Canadian federal election
Party	Candidate	Votes
Liberal	Charles-Alphonse Fournier	5,195
Progressive	Joseph Cléophas Cote	1,109

1925 Canadian federal election
Party	Candidate	Votes
Liberal	Charles-Alphonse Fournier	4,596
Conservative	Murdock McKenzie	1,917

1926 Canadian federal election
Party	Candidate	Votes
Liberal	Oscar Boulanger	4,897
Conservative	Eugène F. Dussault	1,902

1930 Canadian federal election
Party	Candidate	Votes
Liberal	Oscar Boulanger	4,786
Conservative	Joseph-Wilfrid Gaudette	2,793
Source: lop.parl.ca

1935 Canadian federal election
Party	Candidate	Votes
Liberal	Oscar Boulanger	7,470
Conservative	H. Fanning Gosselin	1,720

1940 Canadian federal election
Party	Candidate	Votes
Liberal	Louis-Philippe Picard	6,585
Conservative	Edouard Morrissette	2,366

1945 Canadian federal election
Party	Candidate	Votes
Liberal	Louis-Philippe Picard	6,928
Bloc populaire	Joseph-Albert Bonenfant	3,540

1949 Canadian federal election
Party	Candidate	Votes
Liberal	Louis-Philippe Picard	7,395
Independent	Paul Bouchard	4,798
Union des électeurs	Donat Frenette	332
Progressive Conservative	Jean-Maurice St-Hilaire	41

1953 Canadian federal election
Party	Candidate	Votes
Liberal	Louis-Philippe Picard	7,124
Progressive Conservative	J.-Emile Roy	4,866

By-election on 26 September 1955 Picard's resignation
Party	Candidate	Votes
Liberal	Ovide Laflamme	5,945
Progressive Conservative	Jules Pare	5,383

1957 Canadian federal election
Party	Candidate	Votes
Liberal	Ovide Laflamme	7,960
Progressive Conservative	Paul-Rodolphe Miquelon	1,792
Independent Progressive Conservative	Jules Pare	1,026
Independent Progressive Conservative	Allyre Aubin	139

1958 Canadian federal election
Party	Candidate	Votes
Progressive Conservative	Noël Dorion	6,861
Liberal	Ovide Laflamme	6,255

1962 Canadian federal election
Party	Candidate	Votes
Social Credit	Bernard Dumont	5,091
Liberal	Ovide Laflamme	4,954
Progressive Conservative	Noël Dorion	2,953

1963 Canadian federal election
Party	Candidate	Votes
Liberal	Herman Laverdiere	5,434
Social Credit	Bernard Dumont	5,367
Progressive Conservative	Maurice Laliberte	1,291

1965 Canadian federal election
Party	Candidate	Votes
Liberal	Herman Laverdiere	4,783
Ralliement créditiste	Bernard Dumont	4,432
Progressive Conservative	Jacques La Rochelle	2,264
New Democratic	Mariette Lalonde	170

1968 Canadian federal election
Party	Candidate	Votes
Ralliement créditiste	Adrien Lambert	11,137
Liberal	Auguste Choquette	9,793
Progressive Conservative	Gérard Poulin	2,262
New Democratic	Marcel Lalonde	528

1972 Canadian federal election
Party	Candidate	Votes
Social Credit	Adrien Lambert	12,999
Liberal	Pierre Mercier	11,714
Progressive Conservative	Germain Roy	3,533
New Democratic	Aurèle Marceau	776

1974 Canadian federal election
Party	Candidate	Votes
Social Credit	Adrien Lambert	12,550
Liberal	Louis Paquin	10,759
Progressive Conservative	Bertrand Gaudreau	3,210
New Democratic	Marthe Lachance	604

1979 Canadian federal election
Party	Candidate	Votes	%	±%
Social Credit	Adrien Lambert	18,702	46.43	
Liberal	Jean Richard	17,584	43.65	
Progressive Conservative	Jean Deschênes	2,924	7.26	
Rhinoceros	Marie Claude Chênevert	523	1.30	–
New Democratic	Guy Dupuis	354	0.88	
Union populaire	Jean Beaudoin	195	0.48	
Total valid votes		40,282	100.00	
Total rejected ballots		360		
Turnout		40,642	72.17	
Electors on the lists		56,317		
Source: Report of the Chief Electoral Officer, Thirty-first General Election, 1979.

1980 Canadian federal election
Party	Candidate	Votes	%	±%
Liberal	Alain Garant	20,636	51.13	+7.48
Social Credit	Adrien Lambert	15,124	37.47	−8.96
Progressive Conservative	Jean Deschênes	2,912	7.22	−0.04
Rhinoceros	Andrée Chabot	815	2.02	+0.72
New Democratic	Napoléon Goupil	730	1.81	+0.93
Union populaire	France Théberge	141	0.35	−0.13
Total valid votes		40,358	100.00	
Total rejected ballots		274		
Turnout		40,632	70.86	−1.31
Electors on the lists		57,339		
Source: Report of the Chief Electoral Officer, Thirty-second General Election, 1980.
lop.parl.ca

1984 Canadian federal election
Party	Candidate	Votes
Progressive Conservative	Pierre Blais	24,357
Liberal	Alain Garant	14,500
New Democratic	Roger Lemoine	1,666
Rhinoceros	Serge Au-Boutte Chabot	1,070
Parti nationaliste	André Lizotte	518

1988 Canadian federal election
Party	Candidate	Votes
Progressive Conservative	Pierre Blais	27,621
Liberal	Claudette Beaulieu	11,120
New Democratic	Gilles Papillon	2,762
Green	Alain Raby	1,010

1993 Canadian federal election
Party	Candidate	Votes
Bloc Québécois	François Langlois	17,098
Progressive Conservative	Pierre Blais	15,952
Liberal	Eric Lemieux	8,352
New Democratic	Robert Leclerc	695

== See also ==
- List of Canadian electoral districts
- Historical federal electoral districts of Canada
