= Conservative Party of Canada candidates in the 2015 Canadian federal election =

In the 2015 Canadian federal election, the Conservative Party of Canada ran a candidate in all but one of the 338 federal electoral districts. Ninety-nine of them won a seat in the House of Commons of Canada, which was 60 fewer than in the previous federal election in 2011.

== Candidate statistics ==
Candidates Nominated	Male Candidates	Female Candidates	Most Common Occupation
337	275	62	Business - 38

== Newfoundland and Labrador - 7 seats ==
Riding	Candidate's Name	Notes	Gender	Residenc	Occupation	Votes	%	Rank
Avalon	Lorraine Barnett	Director Regional Affairs, Minister Rob Moore's Regional Office	F	Paradise	Political Staff	4,670	11.1%	4th
Bonavista—Burin—Trinity	Mike Windsor		M	Sunnyside	Teacher, Leadership Development	3,534	10.1%	2nd
Coast of Bays—Central—Notre Dame	Kevin O'Brien	Former Member of the Newfoundland and Labrador House of Assembly for Gander (2003-2015)	M	Gander	Politician	6,479	18.3%	2nd
Labrador	Peter Penashue	Former Member of Parliament for Labrador (2011-2013), resigned over irregularities in his campaign spending and lost in subsequent by-election.	M	Sheshatshiu	Politician, Innu Leader	1,716	13.9%	3rd
Long Range Mountains	Wayne Ruth	Former mayor of Kippens.	M	Kippens	Retired	5,085	12.2%	2nd
St. John's East	Deanne Stapleton	St. John's Port Authority appointee	F	St. John's	Government official	2,938	6.6%	3rd
St. John's South—Mount Pearl	Marek Krol	Reality television personality.	M	Woodbridge, Ontario	Entrepreneur	2,047	4.6%	3rd

== Prince Edward Island - 4 seats ==
Riding	Candidate's Name	Notes	Gender	Residence	Occupation	Votes	%	Rank
Cardigan	Julius Patkai		M	Montague	Business Consultant			
Charlottetown	Ron MacMillan		M	Charlottetown	Lawyer			
Egmont	Gail Shea	Incumbent Member of Parliament, Minister of Fisheries and Oceans	F	Tignish	Business manager			
Malpeque	Stephen Stewart		M	Kensington	Farmer			

== Nova Scotia - 11 seats ==
Riding	Candidate's Name	Notes	Gender	Residence	Occupation	Votes	%	Rank
Cape Breton—Canso	Adam Rodgers	President of the Strait Area Chamber of Commerce	M	Boylston	Lawyer			
Central Nova	Fred Delorey		M					
Cumberland—Colchester	Scott Armstrong	Incumbent Member of Parliament	M	Brookfield	School principal			
Dartmouth—Cole Harbour	Jason Cole		M		Businessman			
Halifax	Irvine Carvery	2013 Nova Scotia Progressive Conservative candidate for Halifax Armdale	M	Halifax	Community activist, former chair of the Halifax Regional School Board			
Halifax West	Michael McGinnis		M					
Kings—Hants	David Morse	Former Member of the Nova Scotia Legislative Assembly for Kings South, 2011 candidate in this riding	M	New Minas	Retired			
Sackville—Preston—Chezzetcook	Robert Strickland		M	Beaver Bank				
South Shore—St. Margaret's	Richard Clark	Former Director of Policy for the minister of ACOA, Rob Moore	M	Barrington Passage	Political staffer			
Sydney—Victoria	John Douglas Chiasson		M					
West Nova	Arnold Leblanc		M					

== New Brunswick - 10 seats ==
Riding	Candidate's Name	Notes	Gender	Residence	Occupation	Votes	%	Rank
Acadie—Bathurst	Louis Robichaud		M	Beresford				
Beauséjour	Ann Bastarache		F					
Fredericton	Keith Ashfield	Incumbent Member of Parliament	M	Lincoln	Businessman			
Fundy Royal	Rob Moore	Incumbent Member of Parliament, Minister of State (Atlantic Canada Opportunities Agency)	M	Quispamsis	Lawyer			
Madawaska—Restigouche	Bernard Valcourt	Incumbent Member of Parliament; Minister of Aboriginal Affairs and Northern Development	M	Edmundston	Lawyer			
Miramichi—Grand Lake	Tilly O'Neill-Gordon	Incumbent Member of Parliament	F	Miramichi	Teacher			
Moncton—Riverview—Dieppe	Robert Goguen	Incumbent Member of Parliament	M	Moncton	Lawyer			
New Brunswick Southwest	John Williamson	Incumbent Member of Parliament	M	St. Andrews	Taxpayer advocate			
Saint John—Rothesay	Rodney Weston	Incumbent Member of Parliament	M	St. Martins	Manager			
Tobique—Mactaquac	Richard Bragdon		M	Woodstock	Pastor			

== Quebec - 78 seats ==
Riding	Candidate's Name	Notes	Gender	Residence	Occupation	Votes	%	Rank
Abitibi—Baie-James—Nunavik—Eeyou	Steven Hébert							
Abitibi—Témiscamingue	Benoit Fortin		M					
Ahuntsic-Cartierville	Wiliam Moughrabi		M	Laval	Retail store manager			
Alfred-Pellan	Gabriel Purcarus		M	LaSalle	Realtor			
Argenteuil—La Petite-Nation	Maxime Hupé-Labelle		M					
Avignon—La Mitis—Matane—Matapédia	André Savoie		M	Québec				
Beauce	Maxime Bernier	Incumbent Member of Parliament, Minister of State (Small Business and Tourism, and Agriculture)	M	Saint-Georges	Lawyer			
Beauport—Côte-de-Beaupré—Île d'Orléans—Charlevoix	Sylvie Boucher	Former Member of Parliament for Beauport—Limoilou	F	Saint-Joachim	Administrator			
Beauport—Limoilou	Alupa Clarke		M	Québec	Military			
Bécancour—Nicolet—Saurel								
Bellechasse—Les Etchemins—Lévis	Steven Blaney	Incumbent Member of Parliament, Minister of Public Safety and Emergency Preparedness	M	Saint-Rédempteur	Engineer			
Beloeil—Chambly	Claude Chalhoub	2014 Conservative Party of Quebec provincial election candidate for Châteauguay and 2012 candidate for La Pinière	M	Delson	Operations manager			
Berthier—Maskinongé	Marianne Foucrault							
Bourassa	Jason Potasso-Justino							
Brome—Missisquoi	Charles Poulin	Former CHL Player of the Year	M	Magog	Hockey coach			
Brossard—Saint-Lambert	Qais Hamidi	2011 candidate in Saint-Lambert, 2006 candidate in Laval—Les Îles	M	Brossard	Businessman			
Charlesbourg—Haute-Saint-Charles	Pierre Paul-Hus	2011 candidate in this riding	M	Québec	Editor			
Châteauguay—Lacolle	Philippe St-Pierre		M	Châteauguay	Public servant			
Chicoutimi—Le Fjord	Caroline Ste-Marie							
Compton—Stanstead	Gustavo Labrador		M	Sherbrooke				
Dorval—Lachine—LaSalle	Daniela Chivu	Former convener for Immigration and Citizenship and Global Affairs, and co-representative to the United Nations Commission on the Status of Women for the National Council of Women of Canada	F	Montreal	Public servant			
Drummond	Pascale Déry	Former TV anchor and losing candidate in Mount Royal nomination contest	F	Montreal	Media			
Gaspésie—Les Îles-de-la-Madeleine	Jean-Pierre Pigeon							
Gatineau	Luc Angers	Former Gatineau City Councillor for Pointe-Gatineau	M	Gatineau	Teacher			
Hochelaga	Augustin Ali		M	Lachine	Businessman			
Honoré-Mercier	Guy Croteau		M	Montreal				
Hull—Aylmer	Étienne Boulerice		M	Gatineau	Businessman			
Joliette	Soheil Eid							
Jonquière	Ursula Larouche		F	Jonquière	Natural resource development advisor			
La Pointe-de-l'Île	Guy Morrissette	2014 Conservative Party of Quebec provincial election candidate for Saint-Laurent	M	Montreal	Customer service			
La Prairie	Yves Perras		M	Saint-Constant	Realtor			
Lac-Saint-Jean	Denis Lebel	Incumbent Member of Parliament, President of the Queen's Privy Council for Canada and Minister of Infrastructure, Communities and Intergovernmental Affairs	M	Roberval	Hotel manager, restaurateur			
Lac-Saint-Louis	Éric Girard	Former Senior Vice President, Corporate Treasury, National Bank of Canada	M	Mount Royal	Economist			
LaSalle—Émard—Verdun	Mohammad Zamir		M	LaSalle				
Laurentides—Labelle	Sylvain Charron							
Laurier—Sainte-Marie	Daniel Gaudreau							
Laval—Les Îles	Roland Dick		M	Laval	Architect			
Lévis—Lotbinière	Jacques Gourde	Incumbent Member of Parliament	M	Saint-Narcisse-de-Beaurivage	Farmer			
Longueuil—Charles-LeMoyne	Thomas Barré		M	Saint-Lambert	Student			
Longueuil—Saint-Hubert	John Sedlak		M	Longueuil				
Louis-Hébert	Jean-Pierre Asselin							
Louis-Saint-Laurent	Gérard Deltell	Former Leader of the Action démocratique du Québec (ADQ), former ADQ and CAQ Member of the Quebec National Assembly for Chauveau	M	Québec	Journalist			
Manicouagan	Yvon Boudreau							
Marc-Aurèle-Fortin	Johanne Théorêt		F	Laval	Cosmetics representative			
Mégantic—L'Érable	Luc Berthold	Former mayor of Thetford Mines	M		Politician			
Mirabel	Gordon Ferguson		M	Québec				
Montarville	Stéphane Duranleau		M	Saint-Hubert	Lawyer			
Montcalm	Gisèle Desroches							
Montmagny—L'Islet—Kamouraska—Rivière-du-Loup	Bernard Généreux	Former Member of Parliament	M	La Pocatière	Entrepreneur			
Mount Royal	Robert Libman	Former borough mayor of Côte-Saint-Luc–Hampstead–Montreal West (2001-2005), former mayor of Côte Saint-Luc (1998-2001) and former Equality Party Member of the National Assembly (1989-1994)	M	Côte Saint-Luc	Businessman			
Notre-Dame-de-Grâce—Westmount	Richard Sagala	2014 Quebec Liberal Party Candidate for Mercier	M	Montreal	Sommelier			
Outremont	Rodolphe Husny							
Papineau	Yvon Vadnais							
Pierre-Boucher—Les Patriotes—Verchères	Clovis Maheux							
Pierrefonds—Dollard	Valérie Assouline	2014 Coalition Avenir Québec (CAQ) candidate for Laurier-Dorion	F	Dollard-des-Ormeaux	Lawyer			
Pontiac	Benjamin Woodman		M	Gatineau	Canadian Armed Forces Corporal			
Portneuf—Jacques-Cartier	Joël Godin		M	Saint-Augustin-de-Desmaures	Political advisor			
Québec	Pierre-Thomas Asselin		M	Québec	Military			
Repentigny	Buddy Ford		M	Repentigny	Event planner			
Richmond—Arthabaska	Alain Rayes	Mayor of Victoriaville	M	Victoriaville	Politician			
Rimouski-Neigette—Témiscouata—Les Basques	Francis Fortin							
Rivière-des-Mille-Îles	Érick Gauthier	2006 and 2004 candidate in this riding	M	Saint-Eustache	Teacher			
Rivière-du-Nord	Romain Vignol		M	Québec				
Rosemont—La Petite-Patrie	Jeremy Dohan		M	Outremont				
Saint-Hyacinthe—Bagot	Réjean Léveillé							
Saint-Jean	Stéphane Guinta	Director of Human Resources for the City of Châteauguay	M	Candiac	Lawyer			
Saint-Laurent	Jimmy Yu	2011 candidate in LaSalle—Émard	M	Pointe-Calumet	Businessman			
Saint-Léonard—Saint-Michel	Jean-Philippe Fournier	2014 Conservative Party of Quebec provincial election candidate for Blainville	M	Blainville	Mechanical engineering student, writer			
Saint-Maurice—Champlain	Jacques Grenier	2011 candidate in this riding	M	Grand-Mère	Retired			
Salaberry—Suroît	Albert De Martin	Former ADQ Member of the Quebec National Assembly for Huntingdon	M	Godmanchester	Businessman			
Shefford	Sylvie Fontaine		F	Granby	Retired			
Sherbrooke	Marc Dauphin	Former Canadian Army surgeon	M	Coaticook	Retired medical doctor			
Terrebonne	Michel Surprenant							
Thérèse-De Blainville	Manuel Puga		M	Blainville	Hotel president			
Trois-Rivières	Dominic Therrien		M	Port Moody	Lawyer			
Vaudreuil—Soulanges	Marc Boudreau	2011 and 2008 candidate in this riding	M	Terrebonne	Lawyer			
Ville-Marie—Le Sud-Ouest—Île-des-Soeurs	Steve Shanahan	Montreal City Councillor for Peter-McGill	M	Montreal	Marketing consultant			
Vimy	Anthony Mavros		M	Montreal	Student			

== Ontario - 121 seats ==
Riding	Candidate's Name	Notes	Gender	Residence	Occupation	Votes	%	Rank
Ajax	Chris Alexander	Incumbent Member of Parliament; Minister of Citizenship & Immigration	M	Ajax	Diplomat			
Algoma—Manitoulin—Kapuskasing	André Robichaud							
Aurora—Oak Ridges—Richmond Hill	Costas Menegakis	Incumbent Member of Parliament for Richmond Hill	M	Richmond Hill	Entrepreneur			
Barrie—Innisfil	John Brassard	Barrie City Councillor	M	Barrie	Firefighter			
Barrie—Springwater—Oro-Medonte	Alex Nuttall	Barrie City Councillor	M	Barrie	Banker			
Bay of Quinte	Jodie Jenkins	Belleville City Councillor, 2003 and 2007 Ontario NDP candidate for Prince Edward—Hastings	M	Belleville	Radio advertising			
Beaches—East York	Bill Burrows	2011 candidate in this riding	M	Toronto	Sales manager			
Brampton Centre	Bal Gosal	Incumbent Member of Parliament, Minister of State (Sport)	M	Brampton	Insurance broker			
Brampton East	Naval Bajaj		M					
Brampton North	Parm Gill	Incumbent Member of Parliament	M	Brampton	Entrepreneur			
Brampton South	Kyle Seeback	Incumbent Member of Parliament for Brampton West	M	Amaranth	Lawyer			
Brampton West	Ninder Thind		F					
Brantford—Brant	Phil McColeman	Incumbent Member of Parliament	M	Brantford	Project manager			
Bruce—Grey—Owen Sound	Larry Miller	Incumbent Member of Parliament	M	South Bruce Peninsula	Farmer			
Burlington	Mike Wallace	Incumbent Member of Parliament	M	Burlington	Sales executive			
Cambridge	Gary Goodyear	Incumbent Member of Parliament, Minister of State (Federal Economic Development Agency for Southern Ontario)	M	Cambridge	Chiropractor			
Carleton	Pierre Poilievre	Incumbent Member of Parliament, Minister of Employment and Social Development, Minister of State (Democratic Reform)	M	Nepean	Policy analyst			
Chatham-Kent—Leamington	Dave Van Kesteren	Incumbent Member of Parliament	M	Chatham	Parliamentarian			
Davenport	Carlos Oliveira		M					
Don Valley East	Maureen Harquail	2011 candidate in St. Pauls, 2008 by-election candidate in Willowdale	F	Toronto	Lawyer			
Don Valley North	Joe Daniel	Incumbent Member of Parliament for Don Valley East	M	Toronto	Businessman			
Don Valley West	John Carmichael	Incumbent Member of Parliament	M	Toronto	Business executive			
Dufferin—Caledon	David Tilson	Incumbent Member of Parliament	M	Mono	Lawyer			
Durham	Erin O'Toole	Incumbent Member of Parliament	M	Courtice	Lawyer			
Eglinton—Lawrence	Joe Oliver	Incumbent Member of Parliament, Minister of Finance	M	Toronto	Retired			
Elgin—Middlesex—London	Karen Vecchio		F	Sparta	Executive assistant			
Essex	Jeff Watson	Incumbent Member of Parliament	M	Amherstburg	Auto worker			
Etobicoke Centre	Ted Opitz	Incumbent Member of Parliament	M	Toronto	Political advisor			
Etobicoke North	Toyin Dada							
Etobicoke—Lakeshore	Bernard Trottier	Incumbent Member of Parliament	M	Etobicoke	Business consultant			
Flamborough—Glanbrook	David Sweet	Incumbent Member of Parliament	M	Ancaster	Businessman			
Glengarry—Prescott—Russell	Pierre Lemieux	Incumbent Member of Parliament	M	Cumberland	Mechanical engineer			
Guelph	Gloria Kovach							
Haldimand—Norfolk	Diane Finley	Incumbent Member of Parliament, Minister of Public Works & Government Services	F	Simcoe	Executive			
Haliburton—Kawartha Lakes—Brock	Jamie Schmale		M	Lindsay	Executive assistant			
Hamilton Centre	Yonatan Rozenszajn		M	Hamilton	Lawyer			
Hamilton East—Stoney Creek	Diane Bubanko		F	Hamilton	Executive assistant			
Hamilton Mountain	Allan Miles		M					
Hamilton West—Ancaster—Dundas	Vincent Samuel		M	Ancaster	Retired nurse			
Hastings—Lennox and Addington	Daryl Kramp	Incumbent Member of Parliament	M	Madoc	Parliamentarian			
Humber River—Black Creek	Kerry Vandenberg		M		Canadian Armed Forces Officer			
Huron—Bruce	Ben Lobb	Incumbent Member of Parliament	M	Clinton	Business analyst			
Kanata—Carleton	Walter Pamic							
Kenora	Greg Rickford	Incumbent Member of Parliament, Minister of Natural Resources	M	Keewatin	Lawyer			
King—Vaughan	Konstantin Toubis		M	Vaughan	Realtor			
Kingston and the Islands	Andy Brooke		M	Kingston	Retired RCMP officer			
Kitchener Centre	Stephen Woodworth	Incumbent Member of Parliament	M	Kitchener	Lawyer			
Kitchener—Conestoga	Harold Albrecht	Incumbent Member of Parliament	M	Petersburg	Dentist, farmer			
Kitchener South—Hespeler	Marian Meinen-Gagné		F	Kitchener	Political Assistant			
Lambton—Kent—Middlesex	Bev Shipley	Incumbent Member of Parliament	M	Denfield	Farmer			
Lanark—Frontenac—Kingston	Scott Reid	Incumbent Member of Parliament	M	Mississippi Mills	Historian			
Leeds—Grenville—Thousand Islands and Rideau Lakes	Gord Brown	Incumbent Member of Parliament	M	Gananoque	Innkeeper			
London—Fanshawe	Suzanna Dieleman	Director of Finance/Treasurer for Malahide	F	Aylmer	Public administrator			
London North Centre	Susan Truppe	Incumbent Member of Parliament	F	London	Assistant general manager			
London West	Ed Holder	Incumbent Member of Parliament, Minister of State (Science and Technology)	M	London	Insurance Benefits Consultant			
Markham—Stouffville	Paul Calandra	Incumbent Member of Parliament for Oak Ridges—Markham	M	Stouffville	Insurance broker			
Markham—Thornhill	Jobson Easow		M	Markham	Businessman			
Markham—Unionville	Bob Saroya	2011 candidate in this riding, 2008 candidate in Etobicoke North	M	Richmond Hill	Entrepreneur			
Milton	Lisa Raitt	Incumbent Member of Parliament, Minister of Transport	F	Moffatt	Lawyer			
Mississauga Centre	Julius Tiangson	Executive Director of the Gateway Centre for New Canadians	M	Mississauga	Financial advisor			
Mississauga East—Cooksville	Wladyslaw Lizon	Incumbent Member of Parliament	M	Mississauga	Mining engineer			
Mississauga—Erin Mills	Bob Dechert	Incumbent Member of Parliament	M	Mississauga	Lawyer			
Mississauga—Lakeshore	Stella Ambler	Incumbent Member of Parliament	F	Mississauga	Community activist			
Mississauga—Malton	Jagdish Grewal		M	Toronto	Journalist			
Mississauga—Streetsville	Brad Butt	Incumbent Member of Parliament	M	Mississauga	Municipal administrator			
Nepean	Andy Wang	Political advisor	M	Ottawa				
Newmarket—Aurora	Lois Brown	Incumbent Member of Parliament	F	Newmarket	Consultant			
Niagara Centre	Leanna Villella	2011 candidate in Welland	F	Welland	Businesswoman			
Niagara Falls	Rob Nicholson	Incumbent Member of Parliament; Minister of Foreign Affairs	M	Niagara Falls	Lawyer			
Niagara West	Dean Allison	Incumbent Member of Parliament	M	Beamsville	Businessman			
Nickel Belt	Aino Laamnen		F					
Nipissing—Timiskaming	Jay Aspin	Incumbent Member of Parliament	M	North Bay	Business entrepreneur			
Northumberland—Peterborough South	Adam Moulton		M	Cobourg	Commercial sales director			
Oakville	Terence Young	Incumbent Member of Parliament	M	Oakville	Consultant			
Oakville North—Burlington	Effie Triantafilopoulos		F					
Orléans	Royal Galipeau	Incumbent Member of Parliament	M	Ottawa	Businessman			
Oshawa	Colin Carrie	Incumbent Member of Parliament	M	Oshawa	Chriopractor			
Ottawa Centre	Damian Konstantinakos	2011 candidate in this riding	M	Ottawa	Engineer			
Ottawa South	Dev Balkissoon		M	Ottawa	Research			
Ottawa—Vanier	David Piccini		M	Ottawa	Soccer coach			
Ottawa West—Nepean	Abdul Abdi		M	Ottawa	Police officer			
Oxford	Dave MacKenzie	Incumbent Member of Parliament	M	Woodstock	General manager			
Parkdale—High Park	Ian Allen		M					
Parry Sound-Muskoka	Tony Clement	Incumbent Member of Parliament, President of the Treasury Board	M	Port Sydney	Lawyer			
Perth Wellington	John Nater	West Perth Municipal Councillor for the Mitchell Ward	M	Mitchell	Lecturer			
Peterborough—Kawartha	Michael Skinner		M					
Pickering—Uxbridge	Corneliu Chisu	Incumbent Member of Parliament	M	Scarborough	Engineer			
Renfrew—Nipissing—Pembroke	Cheryl Gallant	Incumbent Member of Parliament	F	Pembroke	Office manager			
Richmond Hill	Michael Parsa		M	Richmond Hill	Businessman			
St. Catharines	Rick Dykstra	Incumbent Member of Parliament	M	St. Catharines	Businessman			
Sarnia—Lambton	Marilyn Gladu	Former President of the Lambton Conservative Association	F	Petrolia	Consultant			
Sault Ste. Marie	Bryan Hayes	Incumbent Member of Parliament	M	Sault Ste. Marie	Financial analyst			
Scarborough Centre	Roxanne James	Incumbent Member of Parliament	F	Scarborough	Realtor			
Scarborough North	Ravinder Malhi		F	Markham	Businesswoman			
Scarborough Southwest	Roshan Nallaratnam		M					
Scarborough—Agincourt	Bin Chang	2014 Markham Regional Council candidate	F	Markham	Professor			
Scarborough-Guildwood	Chuck Konkel	2011 and 2008 candidate in this riding	M	Toronto	Police officer			
Scarborough—Rouge Park	Leslyn Lewis		F					
Simcoe—Grey	Kellie Leitch	Incumbent Member of Parliament, Minister of Labour	F	Creemore	Surgeon			
Simcoe North	Bruce Stanton	Incumbent Member of Parliament	M	Coldwater	Hotel manager			
Spadina—Fort York	Sabrina Zuniga		F					
Stormont—Dundas—South Glengarry	Guy Lauzon	Incumbent Member of Parliament	M	St. Andrews West	Business manager			
Sudbury	Fred Slade	2011 candidate in this riding	M	Sudbury	Accountant			
Thornhill	Peter Kent	Incumbent Member of Parliament	M	Thornhill	Broadcast Executive			
Thunder Bay—Rainy River	Moe Comuzzi	2011 candidate in this riding under the name Maureen Commuzi-Stehmann	F	Thunder Bay	Businesswoman			
Thunder Bay—Superior North	Richard Harvey	2011 candidate in this riding	M	Nipigon	Current mayor of the township of Nipigon			
Timmins-James Bay	John P. Curley		M					
Toronto Centre	Julian Di Battista		M	Toronto	Senior Analyst			
Toronto—Danforth	Tim Dutaud		M	Toronto	Realtor			
Toronto—St. Paul's	Marnie MacDougall		F	Toronto	Executive assistant			
University—Rosedale	Karim Jivraj		M	Toronto	Lawyer			
Vaughan—Woodbridge	Julian Fantino	Incumbent Member of Parliament; Minister of Veterans Affairs	M	Vaughan	Former commissioner of Ontario Provincial Police			
Waterloo	Peter Braid	Incumbent Member of Parliament	M	Kitchener	Account manager			
Wellington—Halton Hills	Michael Chong	Incumbent Member of Parliament	M	Elora	Parliamentarian			
Whitby	Pat Perkins	Incumbent Member of Parliament	F	Whitby	Businesswoman			
Willowdale	Chungsen Leung	Incumbent Member of Parliament	M	Richmond Hill	Businessman			
Windsor—Tecumseh	Jo-Anne Gignac	Windsor City Councillor for Ward 6	F	Windsor	Politician			
Windsor West	Henry Lau		M					
York Centre	Mark Adler	Incumbent Member of Parliament	M	Toronto	Businessman			
York—Simcoe	Peter Van Loan	Incumbent Member of Parliament, Government House Leader	M	Sutton West	Lawyer			
York South—Weston	James Robinson		M	Whitby	Bishop			

== Manitoba - 14 seats ==
Riding	Candidate's Name	Notes	Gender	Residence	Occupation	Votes	%	Rank
Brandon—Souris	Larry Maguire	Incumbent Member of Parliament	M	Virden	Farmer			
Charleswood—St. James—Assiniboia—Headingley	Steven Fletcher	Incumbent Member of Parliament	M	Headingley	Engineer			
Churchill—Keewatinook Aski	Kyle Mirecki		M					
Dauphin—Swan River—Neepawa	Robert Sopuck	Incumbent Member of Parliament	M	Sandy Lake	Fisheries biologist			
Elmwood—Transcona	Lawrence Toet	Incumbent Member of Parliamentf	M	Winnipeg	Businessman			
Kildonan—St. Paul	Jim Bell	Former president of the Winnipeg Blue Bombers	M	East St. Paul	Businessman			
Portage—Lisgar	Candice Bergen	Incumbent Member of Parliament, Minister of State (Social Development)	F	Winkler	Political consultant/organizer			
Provencher	Ted Falk	Incumbent Member of Parliament	M	Steinbach	Businessman			
Saint Boniface—Saint Vital	François Catellier		M					
Selkirk—Interlake—Eastman	James Bezan	Incumbent Member of Parliament	M	Teulon	Cattle producer			
Winnipeg Centre	Allie Szarkiewicz		F	Winnipeg				
Winnipeg North	Harpreet Turka		M	Winnipeg	Oil & gas sales, actor			
Winnipeg South	Gordon Giesbrecht		M	Winnipeg	Professor			
Winnipeg South Centre	Joyce Bateman	Incumbent Member of Parliament	F	Winnipeg	Accountant			

== Saskatchewan - 14 seats ==
Riding	Candidate's Name	Notes	Gender	Residence	Occupation	Votes	%	Rank
Battlefords—Lloydminster	Gerry Ritz	Incumbent Member of Parliament, Minister of Agriculture and Agri-Food	M	St. Walburg	Businessman			
Carlton Trail—Eagle Creek	Kelly Block	Incumbent Member of Parliament	F	Saskatoon	Administrator			
Cypress Hills—Grasslands	David Anderson	Incumbent Member of Parliament	M	Frontier	Farmer			
Desnethé—Missinippi—Churchill River	Rob Clarke	Incumbent Member of Parliament	M	Waskesiu Lake	RCMP Sergeant			
Moose Jaw—Lake Centre—Lanigan	Tom Lukiwski	Incumbent Member of Parliament	M	Regina Beach	Businessman			
Prince Albert	Randy Hoback	Incumbent Member of Parliament	M	Shellbrook	Farmer			
Regina—Lewvan	Trent Fraser		M	Regina	Businessman			
Regina—Qu'Appelle	Andrew Scheer	Incumbent Member of Parliament, Speaker of the House of Commons	M	Regina	Insurance Industry			
Regina—Wascana	Michael Kram		M	Regina	IT expert			
Saskatoon—Grasswood	Kevin Waugh		M	Saskatoon	Television broadcaster			
Saskatoon—University	Brad Trost	Incumbent Member of Parliament	M	Saskatoon	Geophysicist			
Saskatoon West	Randy Donauer	Saskatoon City Councillor for Ward 5	M	Saskatoon	Businessman			
Souris—Moose Mountain	Robert Kitchen		M	Estevan	Chiropractor			
Yorkton—Melville	Cathay Wagantall		F	Esterhazy	Businesswoman, signs & printing			

== Alberta - 34 seats ==
Riding	Candidate's Name	Notes	Gender	Residence	Occupation	Votes	%	Rank
Banff—Airdrie	Blake Richards	Incumbent Member of Parliament	M	Airdrie	Realtor			
Battle River—Crowfoot	Kevin Sorenson	Incumbent Member of Parliament, Minister of State (Finance)	M	Killam	Farmer			
Bow River	Martin Shields	Mayor of Brooks	M	Brooks	Teacher			
Calgary Centre	Joan Crockatt	Incumbent Member of Parliament	F	Calgary	Journalist			
Calgary Confederation	Len Webber	Former Member of the Alberta Legislative Assembly for Calgary-Foothills	M	Calgary	Electrician			
Calgary Forest Lawn	Deepak Obhrai	Incumbent Member of Parliament	M	Chestermere	Businessman			
Calgary Heritage	Stephen Harper	Incumbent Member of Parliament; Prime Minister; Leader of the Conservative Party of Canada	M	Calgary	Economist			
Calgary Midnapore	Jason Kenney	Incumbent Member of Parliament, Minister of National Defence	M	Calgary	Executive Director			
Calgary Nose Hill	Michelle Rempel	Incumbent Member of Parliament, Minister of State (Western Economic Diversification)	F	Calgary	Management consultant			
Calgary Rocky Ridge	Pat Kelly		M	Calgary	Businessman			
Calgary Shepard	Tom Kmiec		M	Calgary	Human resources			
Calgary Signal Hill	Ron Liepert	Former Member of the Alberta Legislative Assembly for Calgary West, former Alberta Minister of Health and Wellness	M	Calgary	Consultant			
Calgary Skyview	Devinder Shory	Incumbent Member of Parliament	M	Calgary	Lawyer			
Edmonton Centre	James Cumming	President/CEO of the Edmonton Chamber of Commerce	M	Edmonton	Construction			
Edmonton Griesbach	Kerry Diotte	Former Edmonton City Councillor for Ward 11, former Edmonton Sun columnist	M	Edmonton	Consultant			
Edmonton Manning	Ziad Aboultaif		M	Edmonton	Businessman			
Edmonton Mill Woods	Tim Uppal	Incumbent Member of Parliament, Minister of State (Multiculturalism)	M	Sherwood Park	Business manager			
Edmonton Riverbend	Matt Jeneroux		M					
Edmonton Strathcona	Len Thom		M	Edmonton	Lawyer			
Edmonton West	Kelly McCauley		M	Edmonton	Hotel manager			
Edmonton—Wetaskiwin	Mike Lake	Incumbent Member of Parliament	M	Edmonton	Account executive			
Foothills	John Barlow	Incumbent Member of Parliament	M	Okotoks	Journalist			
Fort McMurray—Cold Lake	David Yurdiga	Incumbent Member of Parliament	M	Grassland	Farmer			
Grande Prairie-Mackenzie	Chris Warkentin	Incumbent Member of Parliament	M	Grande Prairie	Contractor			
Lakeland	Shannon Stubbs	Former Director of Legislative Affairs for Rob Anderson, former Chief of Staff for Danielle Smith and wife of Alberta MLA Shayne Saskiw	F	Two Hills	Political assistant			
Lethbridge	Rachael Harder		F	Lethbridge	Youth consultant			
Medicine Hat—Cardston—Warner	Jim Hillyer	Incumbent Member of Parliament for Lethbridge	M	Raymond	Business consultant			
Peace River—Westlock	Arnold Viersen		M	Barrhead	Mechanic			
Red Deer—Lacombe	Blaine Calkins	Incumbent Member of Parliament	M	Lacombe	College instructor			
Red Deer—Mountain View	Earl Dreeshen	Incumbent Member of Parliament	M	Innisfail	Farmer			
Sherwood Park—Fort Saskatchewan	Garnett Genuis	2012 Wildrose Party provincial election candidate for Sherwood Park	M	Sherwood Park	Opinion research			
St. Albert—Edmonton	Michael Cooper		M	St. Albert	Lawyer			
Sturgeon River—Parkland	Rona Ambrose	Incumbent Member of Parliament; Minister of Health	F	Spruce Grove	Public servant			
Yellowhead	Jim Eglinski	Incumbent Member of Parliament	M	Yellowhead County	Retired RCMP officer			

== British Columbia - 42 seats ==
Riding	Candidate's Name	Notes	Gender	Residence	Occupation	Votes	%	Rank
Abbotsford	Ed Fast	Incumbent Member of Parliament, Minister of International Trade	M	Abbotsford	Lawyer			
Burnaby North—Seymour	Mike Little	North Vancouver District Council Member	M	North Vancouver	Lumber transportation			
Burnaby South	Grace Seear		F					
Cariboo—Prince George	Todd Doherty	Former Director of Revenue Generation for the 2015 Canada Winter Games	M	Prince George	Businessman			
Central Okanagan—Similkameen—Nicola	Dan Albas	Incumbent Member of Parliament	M	West Kelowna	Martial arts instructor			
Chilliwack—Hope	Mark Strahl	Incumbent Member of Parliament	M	Chilliwack	Parliamentarian			
Cloverdale—Langley City	Dean Drysdale	Former Langley Township Councillor, 2000 Canadian Alliance candidate in Vaudreuil-Soulanges	M	Langley	Professor			
Coquitlam—Port Coquitlam	Douglas Horne	Former MLA for Coquitlam-Burke Mountain	M					
Courtenay—Alberni	John Duncan	Incumbent Member of Parliament, Minister of State and Chief Government Whip	M	Ottawa	Forestry			
Cowichan—Malahat—Langford	Martin Baker	Former city councillor for Duncan	M	Duncan				
Delta	Kerry-Lynne Findlay	Incumbent Member of Parliament, Minister of National Revenue	F	Delta	Lawyer			
Esquimalt—Saanich—Sooke	Shari Lukens	Former Colwood municipal councillor	F	Victoria	Sales manager			
Fleetwood—Port Kells	Nina Grewal	Incumbent Member of Parliament	F	Surrey	Businesswoman			
Kamloops—Thompson—Cariboo	Cathy McLeod	Incumbent Member of Parliament	F	Kamloops	Health care management			
Kelowna—Lake Country	Ron Cannan	Incumbent Member of Parliament	M	Kelowna	Advertising consultant			
Kootenay—Columbia	David Wilks	Incumbent Member of Parliament	M	Sparwood	Police officer			
Langley—Aldergrove	Mark Warawa	Incumbent Member of Parliament	M	Langley	Insurance executive			
Mission—Matsqui—Fraser Canyon	Brad Vis		M					
Nanaimo—Ladysmith	Mark MacDonald	Managing editor of the Nanaimo Daily News	M	Nanaimo	Journalist			
New Westminster—Burnaby	Chloé Ellis		F	New Westminster	Business development manager			
North Island—Powell River	Laura Smith		F	Campbell River	Political advisor			
North Okanagan—Shuswap	Mel Arnold	Former president of the British Columbia Wildlife Federation	M	Salmon Arm	Conservationist			
North Vancouver	Andrew Saxton	Incumbent Member of Parliament	M	North Vancouver	Banker			
Pitt Meadows—Maple Ridge	Mike Murray		M					
Port Moody—Coquitlam	Tim Laidler	Former Corporal Canadian Armed Forces	M	Port Moody	Executive Director of Veteran Transition Network			
Prince George—Peace River—Northern Rockies	Bob Zimmer	Incumbent Member of Parliament	M	Fort St. John	Teacher			
Richmond Centre	Alice Wong	Incumbent Member of Parliament	F	Richmond	Teacher			
Saanich—Gulf Islands	Robert Boyd		M	Saanich	Mortgage Broker			
Skeena—Bulkley Valley	Tyler Nesbitt	Former National Councillor of the Conservative Party of Canada	M	Terrace	Manager			
South Okanagan—West Kootenay	Marshall Neufeld	Former National Councillor of the Conservative Party of Canada	M	Penticton	Realtor			
South Surrey—White Rock	Dianne Watts	35th Mayor of Surrey	F	Surrey	Businesswoman			
Steveston—Richmond East	Kenny Chiu	Former Richmond School District Trustee	M	Richmond	Senior Software Development Manager			
Surrey Centre	Sucha Thind		M	Surrey	Businessman			
Surrey—Newton	Harpreet Singh	Host of "The Harpreet Singh Show" on Joytv	M	Surrey	Broadcast journalist			
Vancouver Centre	Elaine Allan		F					
Vancouver East	James Low		M					
Vancouver Granville	Erinn Broshko		M	Vancouver	Lawyer, businessman			
Vancouver Kingsway	Jojo Quimpo		M	Vancouver	Paralegal			
Vancouver Quadra	Blair Lockhart		F					
Vancouver South	Wai Young	Incumbent Member of Parliament	F	Vancouver	Consultant			
Victoria	John Rizzuti		M	Victoria	Retired principal			
West Vancouver—Sunshine Coast—Sea to Sky Country	John Weston	Incumbent Member of Parliament	M	West Vancouver	Lawyer			

== Yukon - 1 seat ==
Riding	Candidate's Name	Notes	Gender	Residence	Occupation	Votes	%	Rank
Yukon	Ryan Leef	Incumbent Member of Parliament	M	Whitehorse	Deputy Superintendent: Department of Justice - Yukon			

== Northwest Territories - 1 seat ==
Riding	Candidate's Name	Notes	Gender	Residence	Occupation	Votes	%	Rank
Northwest Territories	Floyd Roland		M	Inuvik				

== Nunavut - 1 seat ==
Riding	Candidate's Name	Notes	Gender	Residence	Occupation	Votes	%	Rank
Nunavut	Leona Aglukkaq	Incumbent Member of Parliament, Minister of the Environment	F	Iqaluit	Parliamentarian			

== See also ==
- Results of the Canadian federal election, 2011
- Results by riding for the Canadian federal election, 2011
