= Raymond Côté =

Canadian politician

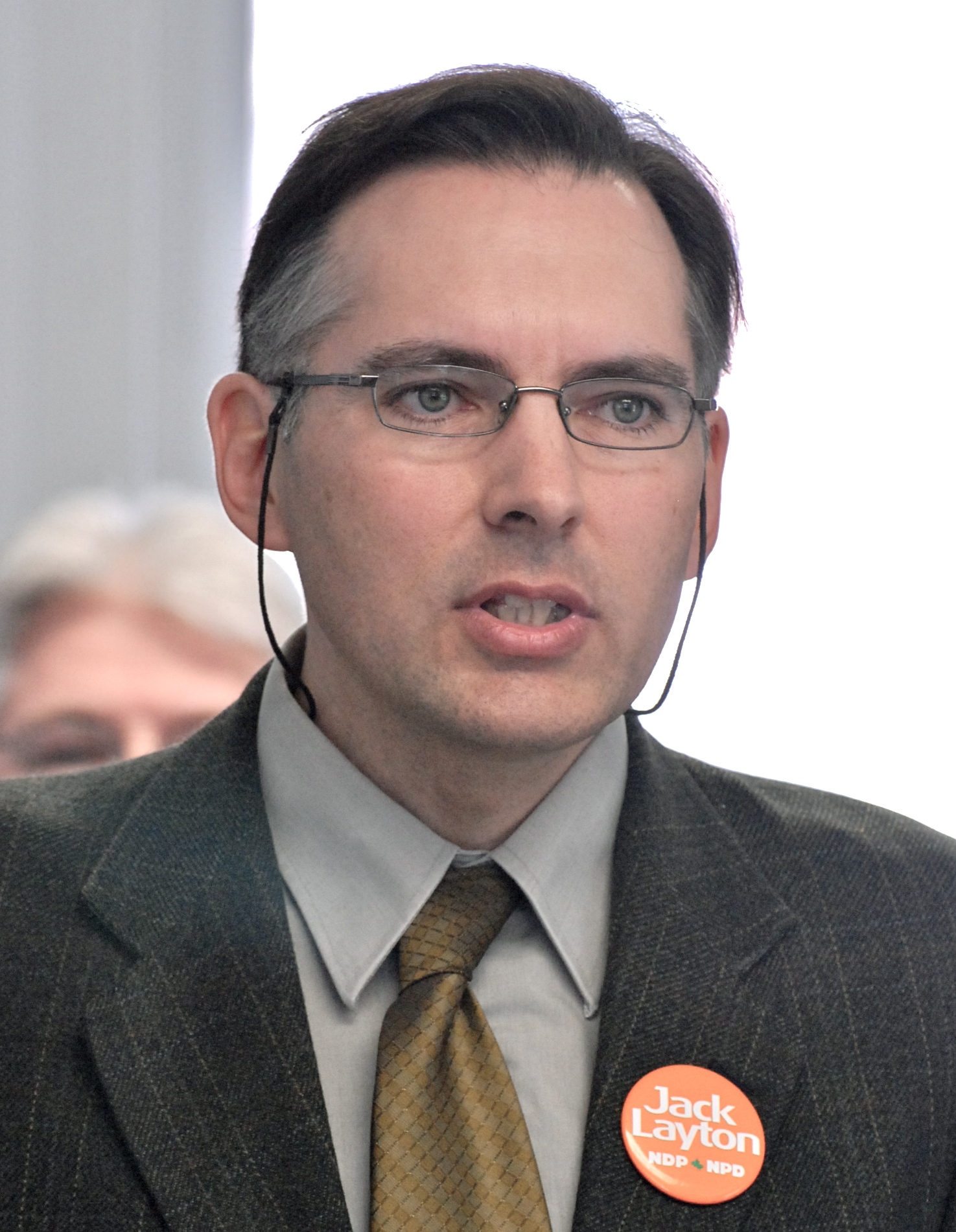

Shadow Minister for Small Business and Tourism
- In office May 26, 2011 – April 18, 2012
- Leader: Jack Layton; Nycole Turmel
- Preceded by: Navdeep Bains; Gerry Byrne
- Succeeded by: Francois Lapointe

Member of Parliament for Beauport—Limoilou
- In office 2011–2015
- Preceded by: Sylvie Boucher
- Succeeded by: Alupa Clarke

Personal details
- Born: January 10, 1967 (age 59) Quebec City, Quebec
- Party: New Democratic Party
- Profession: Public servant

Raymond Côté (born January 10, 1967) is a Canadian politician. He represented the electoral district of Beauport—Limoilou to the House of Commons of Canada from 2011 to 2015.

Côté has a Bachelor of Arts degree from the Université Laval in economics and international relations.

He ran unsuccessfully as the candidate of the New Democratic Party in the electoral district of Lotbinière—Chutes-de-la-Chaudière in both the 2006 and 2008 federal elections.

Prior to being elected to the House of Commons, Côté worked for Services Québec.

Raymond Côté speaking at the NDP gathering in Québec after his election was announced on election night, 2 May 2011.

He was elected in the 2011 general federal election as the NDP candidate in Beauport—Limoilou. He was the spokesperson for small business and tourism in the shadow cabinet of the Official opposition in 2011-2012.

In the 2015 election, he was defeated by the Conservative candidate Alupa Clarke.

In the 2018 New Democratic Party of Quebec leadership election, Côté stood for leadership of the restarted provincial-level NDP, but he lost to Raphaël Fortin.

He ran and lost in the 2025 federal election. Côté endorsed Alberta MP Heather McPherson in the 2026 New Democratic Party leadership election.

== Electoral history ==
2025 Canadian federal election: Beauport—Limoilou
Party	Candidate	Votes	%	±%	Expenditures
Liberal	Steeve Lavoie	21,858	35.59	+10.95	$26,930.97
Conservative	Hugo Langlois	18,492	30.11	–0.43	$62,202.58
Bloc Québécois	Julie Vignola	17,558	28.59	–2.47	$58,214.15
New Democratic	Raymond Côté	2,095	3.41	–6.30	$2,085.36
Green	Dalila Elhak	924	1.50	–0.53	$0.00
People's	Andrée Massicotte	396	0.64	+0.31	$0.00
Marxist–Leninist	Claude Moreau	95	0.15	–0.05	$0.00
Total valid votes		61,418	98.49	+0.72	$136,366.03
Total rejected ballots		939	1.51	–0.72	
Turnout		62,357	68.93	+3.51	
Eligible voters		90,470			
Liberal notional gain from Bloc Québécois		Swing		+6.71	
Source: Elections Canada
Note: number of eligible voters does not include voting day registrations.

2018 Quebec general election: Jean-Lesage
Party	Candidate	Votes	%	±%
Québec solidaire	Sol Zanetti	10,331	34.7	+20.58
Coalition Avenir Québec	Christiane Gamache	9,632	32.35	+8.65
Liberal	Gertrude Bourdon	5,335	17.92	-19.41
Parti Québécois	Claire Vignola	2,774	9.32	-13.1
Conservative	Anne Deblois	520	1.75	+0.96
New Democratic	Raymond Côté	399	1.34	
Green	Alex Paradis-Bellefeuille	343	1.15	
Parti nul	Charles Verreault-Lemieux	192	0.64	-0.58
Citoyens au pouvoir	Marie-Pierre Deschênes	149	0.5	
Équipe Autonomiste	Nicolas Bouffard-Savoie	52	0.17	
Marxist–Leninist	Claude Moreau	44	0.15	+0.01
Total valid votes		29,771	98.19	
Total rejected ballots		548	1.81	
Turnout		30,319	65.78	
Eligible voters		46,090		
Québec solidaire gain from Liberal		Swing		+5.97
Source(s) "Rapport des résultats officiels du scrutin". Élections Québec.

2015 Canadian federal election: Beauport—Limoilou
Party	Candidate	Votes	%	±%	Expenditures
Conservative	Alupa Clarke	15,461	30.58	+5.3	–
New Democratic	Raymond Côté	12,881	25.48	-20.42	–
Liberal	Antoine Bujold	12,854	25.41	+19.06	–
Bloc Québécois	Doni Berberi	7,467	14.77	-5.37	–
Green	Dalila Elhak	1,220	2.41	+0.55	–
Libertarian	Francis Bedard	423	0.84	–	–
Marxist–Leninist	Claude Moreau	128	0.25	+0.02	–
Strength in Democracy	Bladimir Laborit	124	0.25	–	$1,075.02
Total valid votes/Expense limit		50,558	100.0		$213,227.45
Total rejected ballots		941	–	–	
Turnout		51,499	–	–	
Eligible voters		78,601			
Conservative gain from New Democratic		Swing		+12.86	
Source: Elections Canada

2011 Canadian federal election: Beauport—Limoilou
Party	Candidate	Votes	%	±%	Expenditures
New Democratic	Raymond Côté	24,306	46.07	+33.85	
Conservative	Sylvie Boucher	13,845	26.24	-10.52	
Bloc Québécois	Michel Létourneau	10,250	19.43	-13.18	
Liberal	Lorraine Chartier	3,162	5.99	-8.37	
Green	Louise Courville	950	1.80	-0.98	
Christian Heritage	Anne-Marie Genest	124	0.24	-	
Marxist–Leninist	Claude Moreau	122	0.23	-	
Total valid votes/Expense limit		52,759	100.00		
Total rejected ballots		843	1.57	-0.14	
Turnout		53,602	63.26	+3.86	
Eligible voters		84,738	–	–	

2008 Canadian federal election: Lotbinière—Chutes-de-la-Chaudière
Party	Candidate	Votes	%	±%	Expenditures
Conservative	Jacques Gourde	24,495	47.27	-7.07	$72,248.18
Bloc Québécois	Antoine Sarrazin-Bourgoin	12,738	24.58	-5.06	$19,089.72
New Democratic	Raymond Côté	6,828	13.18	+6.39	$2,654.50
Liberal	Marie-Thérèse Hovington	6,498	12.54	+7.11	$3,272.46
Green	Shirley Picknell	1,265	2.44	-1.37	none listed
Total valid votes/Expense limit		51,824	100.0		$85,174
Total rejected, unmarked and declined ballots		908	1.72	+0.74	
Turnout		52,732	66.15	-2.21	
Eligible voters		79,721			
Conservative hold		Swing		-1.00	

2006 Canadian federal election: Lotbinière—Chutes-de-la-Chaudière
Party	Candidate	Votes	%	±%	Expenditures
Conservative	Jacques Gourde	28,236	54.34	+30.20	$45,970.43
Bloc Québécois	Odina Desrochers	15,402	29.64	-16.35	$61,218.95
New Democratic	Raymond Côté	3,529	6.79	+2.50	$2,346.22
Liberal	Éric Paradis	2,820	5.43	-16.02	$17,938.01
Green	Shirley Picknell	1,978	3.81	+0.14	none listed
Total valid votes/Expense limit		51,965	100.0		$78,226
Total rejected, unmarked and declined ballots		513	0.98	-1.41	
Turnout		52,478	68.36		
Eligible voters		76,764			
Conservative gain from Bloc Québécois		Swing		+23.28	
