= One-stop shop =

Government office offering multiple services in a single location

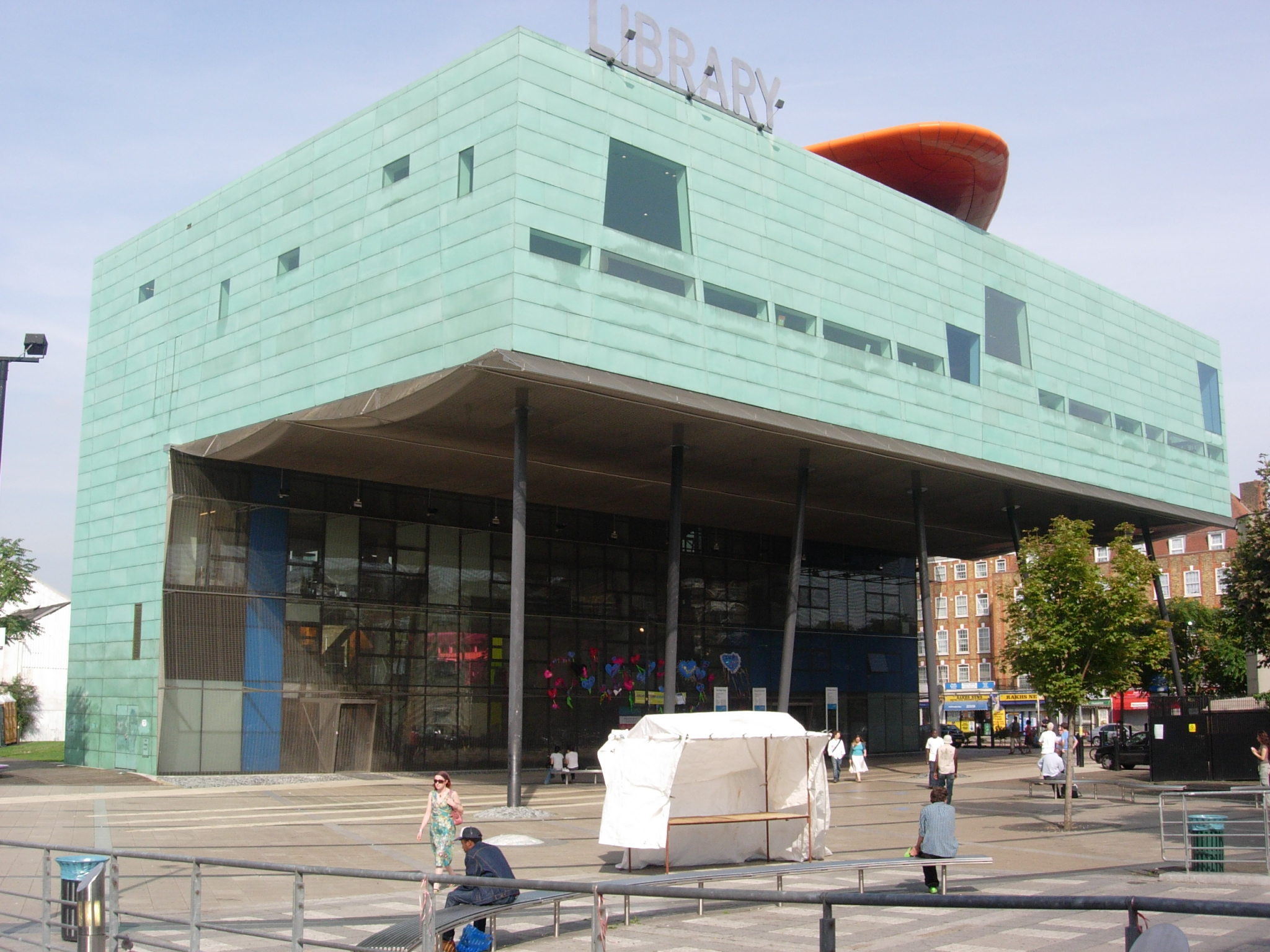
Peckham Library in London houses a physical Southwark council one-stop shop in the United Kingdom.

A one-stop shop (OSS), in public administration, is a government office where multiple services are offered, allowing customers to access these services in a centralized location rather than in different places.

The term originated in the United States in the late 1920s or early 1930s to describe a business model offering customers the convenience of having multiple needs met in one physical location, as with department stores and big-box stores, which offer a wide variety of products.

The phrase is frequently used as slang to describe everything from websites to television shows and mobile apps where people can find most of what they need, including information, in a single place.

== Public administration ==
One-stop shops are an element of New Public Management with a focus on improving the delivery of government services to citizens. Drawing on observed successes in the private sector's model for delivering consumer-centric service to enhance customer satisfaction, government entities employ this model of one-stop shop to help give citizens the feeling that they are able to easily access necessary services. In turn, the ease with which citizens are able to comply with government regulations through sources like the one-stop shop encourages broader compliance with those regulations.

Brazil's Poupatempo (Savetime) centers in São Paulo were first established in 1997 and have since grown not only within the state of São Paulo but throughout the entire country. Serving as a model for other one-stop shops around the nation and around the world, Poupatempo and other similar operations drastically cut down on time and money spent by citizens to complete tasks like the renewal of driver's licenses.

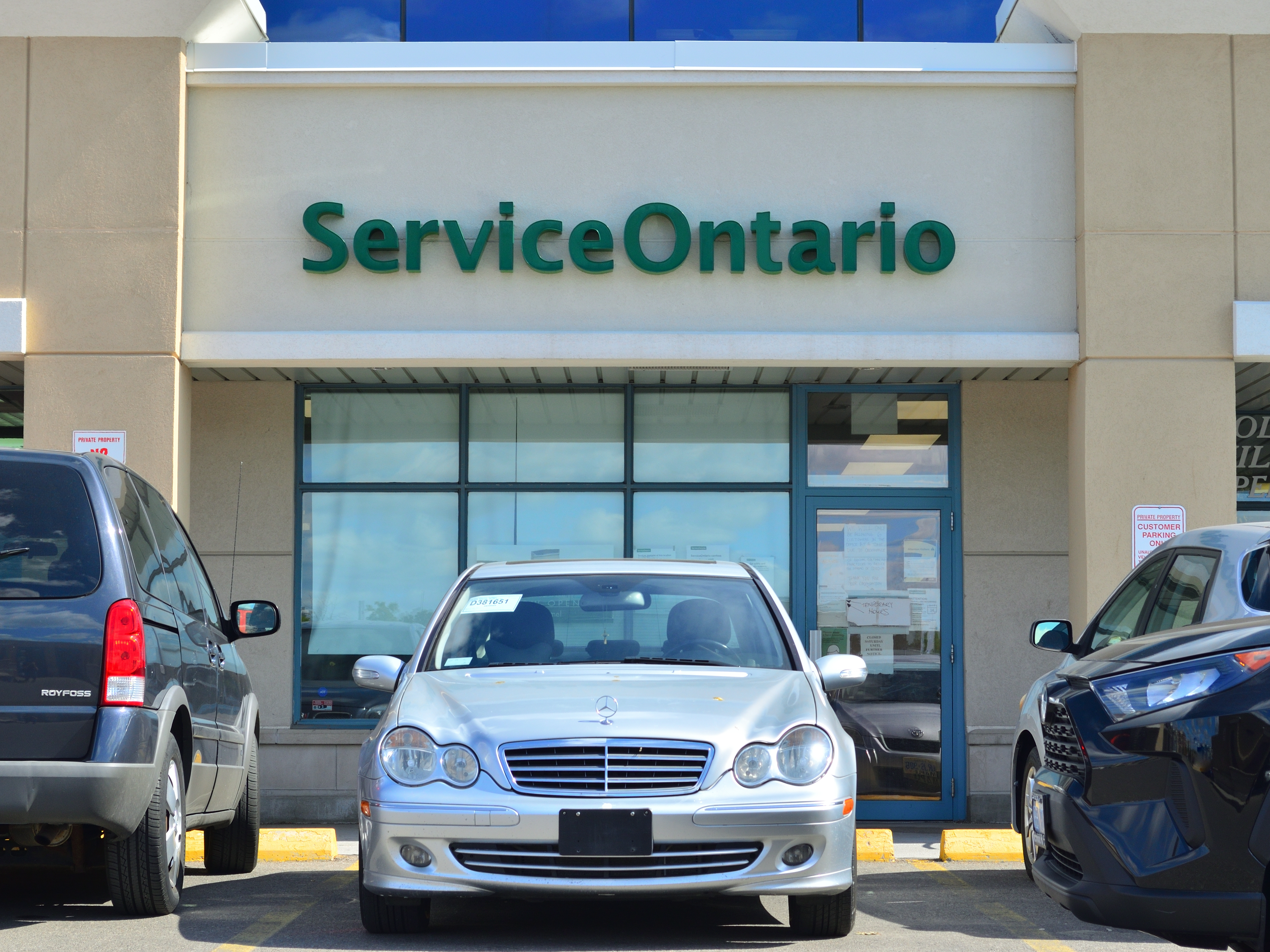
A physical ServiceOntario location on Yonge Street in Richmond Hill, Ontario.

The success of places like Poupatempo encouraged the model's spread. Around the same time, Australia opened the Centrelink agency using the one-stop model. In Canada, one-stop shops like Service Canada at the federal level took root and inspired similar operations at the provincial level, as with ServiceOntario and Services Québec. Localities in the United Kingdom now often use one-stop shops for workforce development, offering job training, housing assistance, and other services at Jobcentres while providing an easy way to get government and council advice. In each case, customer service drove consolidation and streamlining of citizen services to allow governments at every level to better meet the needs of the population.

In the United States, municipalities like Baltimore, Chicago, and New York City pioneered 3-1-1 during the late 1990s and early 2000s as an early version of a virtual one-stop shop, giving citizens and visitors access to a wide variety of information from their telephone while also centralizing and simplifying the ability to report non-emergency quality of life concerns. New York City's 3-1-1 service handles 30,000 calls per day with information on 6,000 government benefits and services available in 180 different languages, all from a single source. The use of virtual one-stop shops like 3-1-1 is a key tenet of e-government, which the United Nations Department of Economic and Social Affairs has emphasized as a method for "effective, transparent, accountable, and democratic" governance with an eye on achieving sustainable development.

In many cases, one-stop shops enhance citizen access by making it easier for people to obtain similar or related services that may not be perfectly aligned in focus or in governmental approach, but may frequently be used together. For instance, in Norway, municipalities are responsible for delivering welfare benefits while the national government handles pensions and unemployment benefits. Rather than force unemployed persons to visit two different offices in different buildings operated by different government entities to secure the full range of their entitlements, the one-stop shop enables them to save time and effort.

In Portugal the government operates a network of one-stop shops called Citizen's Shop (Portuguese: Loja de Cidadão) which began operating in 1999. The Citizen's Shops offer variety of services such as issuing of identity cards and passports, criminal records, tax and healthcare related tasks. A complementary but albeit somehow different service is the Citizen's Space (Portuguese: Espaço de Cidadão) which mainly offers help in granting access to various electronic governmental services.

The concept is not without friction. In one-stop locations that combine services from different government levels, higher level government tiers can threaten lower tiers' ability to operate independently and make decisions separate from the higher entity with which they share space and information for the sake of citizen convenience.

São Paulo's experience with Poupatempo was not uniformly positive. Although the service and its number of locations grew rapidly due to its popularity with citizens, a certain degradation in the social quality of some services has been noted. For instance, the administration of medical exams when obtaining or renewing a driver's license, which was one of the more cumbersome aspects of licensure before Poupatempo's consolidation, has shown decreasing levels of quality over time.

Stephen Goldsmith, a former mayor of Indianapolis, Indiana, has advocated for governments moving beyond one-stop shops with "no-stop shops." Rather than centralize services, a no-stop shop would instead centralize data about citizens, allowing governments to provide service proactively based upon what they would expect individual citizens and households to need. This model enhances e-government by diminishing or eliminating the need for citizens to seek government services, instead bringing those services to them when they are most likely to require specific things.

== Bibliography ==
- Blackburn, G. "One-stop shopping for government services: Strengths and weaknesses of the service Tasmania experience." International Journal of Public Administration 39, no. 5 (2016): 359–369.
- Fredriksson, A. "One Stop Shops for Public Services: Evidence from Citizen Service Centers in Brazil." Journal of Policy Analysis and Management 39, no. 4 (2020): 1133–1165.
- Lagreid, P, and L. H. Rykkja. 2015. "Organizing for "wicked problems" - analyzing coordination arrangements in two policy areas." The International Journal of Public Sector Management 28 (6): 475–493.
- Lambrou, M. A. "Advancing the one-stop shop e-government paradigm." In IEMC'03 Proceedings. Managing Technologically Driven Organizations: The Human Side of Innovation and Change, pp. 489–493. IEEE, 2003.
- Minas, R. (2014). One‐stop shops: Increasing employability and overcoming welfare state fragmentation?. International Journal of Social Welfare, 23, S40–S53.
- OECD (2020), One-Stop Shops for Citizens and Business, OECD Best Practice Principles for Regulatory Policy, OECD Publishing, Paris, https://doi.org/10.1787/b0b0924e-en.
- Prado, M. M., and A. C. da Matta Chasin (2011). "How innovative was the Poupatempo experience in Brazil? Institutional bypass as a new form of institutional change." Brazilian Political Science Review 5 (1): 11–34.
- Scholta, H., W. Mertens, M. Kowalkiewicz, and J. Becker. "From one-stop shop to no-stop shop: An e-government stage model." Government Information Quarterly 36, no. 1 (2019): 11–26.

== See also ==
- Import-OSS (IOSS)
- EU OSS
- Non-EU OSS
- Mini One Stop Shop (MOSS)
