= Sylvie Boucher =

Canadian politician

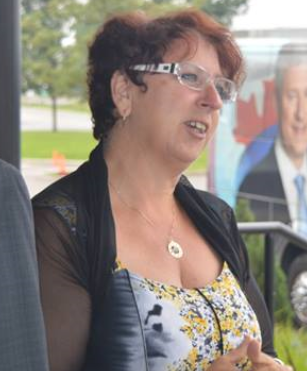

Official Opposition Critic for La Francophonie
- In office November 20, 2015 – August 30, 2017
- Leader: Rona Ambrose; Andrew Scheer
- Preceded by: Pierre Dionne Labelle
- Succeeded by: Alupa Clarke

Member of Parliament for Beauport—Côte-de-Beaupré—Île d'Orléans—Charlevoix
- In office October 19, 2015 – September 11, 2019
- Preceded by: Jonathan Tremblay
- Succeeded by: Caroline Desbiens

Member of Parliament for Beauport—Limoilou
- In office January 23, 2006 – March 26, 2011
- Preceded by: Christian Simard
- Succeeded by: Raymond Côté

Personal details
- Born: December 18, 1962 (age 63) Victoriaville, Quebec, Canada
- Party: Conservative (federal); CAQ (provincial)
- Other political affiliations: Liberal Party of Quebec (1999-2006)
- Spouse: divorced
- Profession: administrator, political advisor, sales consultant

Sylvie Boucher (born December 18, 1962) is a Canadian politician who was served as the Member of Parliament (MP) for the riding of Beauport—Limoilou from 2006 to 2011 and as the MP for Beauport—Côte-de-Beaupré—Île d'Orléans—Charlevoix from 2015 to 2019. She is a member of the Conservative Party.

== Background ==
Boucher has studied office systems technology, gerontology, information technology, and literature. Before politics, she worked in the private sector and specialized in marketing and sales. She has also worked in the National Assembly of Quebec with various jobs and has served as Assistant Chief of Staff to the Canadian Minister of Tourism.

== Federal politics ==
Boucher was elected Member of Parliament for the riding of Beauport—Limoilou, Quebec in the 2006 election by a margin of 820 votes over her Bloc Québécois opponent.

On February 7, 2006, Boucher was appointed as parliamentary secretary to Prime Minister Stephen Harper. On April 10, 2007, she also became Parliamentary Secretary for La Francophonie and Official Languages. On October 10, 2007, she was appointed Parliamentary Secretary to the Prime Minister and for Status of Women. She was re-elected in the 2008 election, but was defeated in the 2011 election by Raymond Côté of the New Democratic Party.

She returned to parliament in the 2015 election and defeated incumbent Jonathan Tremblay in the new riding of Beauport—Côte-de-Beaupré—Île d'Orléans—Charlevoix. She was defeated in the 2019 election.

== Electoral record ==
2019 Canadian federal election: Beauport—Côte-de-Beaupré—Île d'Orléans—Charlevoix
Party	Candidate	Votes	%	±%	Expenditures
Bloc Québécois	Caroline Desbiens	18,407	36.35	+17.21	$10,197.29
Conservative	Sylvie Boucher	15,044	29.71	-3.82	none listed
Liberal	Manon Fortin	10,608	20.95	-5.94	none listed
New Democratic	Gérard Briand	2,841	5.61	-12.85	none listed
Green	Richard Guertin	1,355	2.68	+0.98	$5,913.35
No affiliation	Raymond Bernier	1,335	2.64	–	$5,886.96
People's	Jean-Claude Parent	1,045	2.06	–	none listed
Total valid votes/expense limit		50,635	98.11		
Total rejected ballots		976	1.89		
Turnout		51,611	67.33		
Eligible voters		76,657			
Bloc Québécois gain from Conservative		Swing		+10.52	
Source: Elections Canada

2015 Canadian federal election: Beauport—Côte-de-Beaupré—Île d'Orléans—Charlevoix
Party	Candidate	Votes	%	±%	Expenditures
Conservative	Sylvie Boucher	16,903	33.53	+10.53	–
Liberal	Jean-Roger Vigneau	13,556	26.89	+21.55	–
Bloc Québécois	Sébastien Dufour	9,650	19.14	-12.51	–
New Democratic	Jonathan Tremblay	9,306	18.46	-19.79	–
Green	Patrick Kerr	859	1.7	-0.01	–
Strength in Democracy	Mario Desjardins Pelchat	182	0.36	–	–
Total valid votes/Expense limit		50,406	100.0		$219,234.02
Total rejected ballots		846	–	–	
Turnout		51,302	–	–	
Eligible voters		76,452			
Conservative gain from New Democratic		Swing		+15.16	
Source: Elections Canada

2011 Canadian federal election: Beauport—Limoilou
Party	Candidate	Votes	%	±%	Expenditures
New Democratic	Raymond Côté	24,306	46.07	+33.85	
Conservative	Sylvie Boucher	13,845	26.24	-10.52	
Bloc Québécois	Michel Létourneau	10,250	19.43	-13.18	
Liberal	Lorraine Chartier	3,162	5.99	-8.37	
Green	Louise Courville	950	1.80	-0.98	
Christian Heritage	Anne-Marie Genest	124	0.24	-	
Marxist–Leninist	Claude Moreau	122	0.23	-	
Total valid votes/Expense limit		52,759	100.00		
Total rejected ballots		843	1.57	-0.14	
Turnout		53,602	63.26	+3.86	
Eligible voters		84,738	–	–	
New Democratic gain from Conservative		Swing		+22.19	

2008 Canadian federal election: Beauport—Limoilou
Party	Candidate	Votes	%	±%	Expenditures	
Conservative	Sylvie Boucher	17,994	36.76	-2.68	$48,176	
Bloc Québécois	Éléonore Mainguy	15,962	32.61	-5.26	$28,254	
Liberal	Yves Picard	7,030	14.36	+4.32	$19,558	
New Democratic	Simon-Pierre Beaudet	5,986	12.22	+4.24	$4,297	
Green	Luc Côté	1,363	2.78	-1.30	$0	
Independent	Simon Bédard	610	1.23	–	–	$5,911
Total valid votes/Expense limit		48,945	100.00	$87,843		
Total rejected ballots		849	1.71			
Turnout		49,794	59.40			
Conservative hold		Swing		+1.29		

2006 Canadian federal election: Beauport—Limoilou
Party	Candidate	Votes	%	±%	Expenditures
Conservative	Sylvie Boucher	19,409	39.54		$46,042
Bloc Québécois	Christian Simard	18,589	37.87		47,697
Liberal	Yves Picard	4,929	10.04	–	$28,843
New Democratic	Simone-Pierre Beaudet	3,917	7.98		$3,093
Green	Mario Laprise	2,005	4.08	–	$913
Marxist–Leninist	Jean Bédard	234	0.48	–	not listed
Total valid votes		49,083	100.00		
Total rejected ballots		638			
Turnout		49,721	59.67		
Electors on the lists		83,327			
Sources: Official Results, Elections Canada and Financial Returns, Elections Canada.

== Sources ==
- Sylvie Boucher article at ctv.ca
