= Christian Simard =

Canadian politician

Christian Simard (born December 22, 1954, in Chicoutimi, Quebec (now Saguenay, Quebec)) is a Canadian politician. He is the brother of MNA Sylvain Simard.

A director general, political adviser and project coordinator, Simard was first elected to the House of Commons of Canada in the 2004 federal election. As the Bloc Québécois candidate in the riding of Beauport, in Quebec City, he defeated the Liberal candidate Dennis Dawson by over 11,000 votes. Simard was the Bloc's critic to Housing. However, in the 2006 election he was defeated by the Conservative's Sylvie Boucher in the riding of Beauport—Limoilou by less than 1000 votes.

He ran unsuccessfully as the Parti Québécois candidate in Jean-Lesage in the 2007 Quebec election.

== Electoral record ==
2004 Canadian federal election: Beauport
Party	Candidate	Votes	%	±%	Expenditures
Bloc Québécois	Christian Simard	22,989	49.65		$44,941
Liberal	Dennis Dawson	11,866	25.63	–	$61,325
Conservative	Stephan Asselin	7,388	15.96		$6,974
New Democratic	Xavier Trégan	1,896	4.09		$621
Green	Jeannine T. Desharnais	1,577	3.41		$252
Marijuana	Nicolas Frichot	585	1.26		none listed
Total valid votes		46,301	100.00		
Total rejected ballots		1,129			
Turnout		47,430	56.68		
Electors on the lists		83,685			
Percentage change figures are factored for redistribution. Conservative Party percentages are contrasted with the combined Canadian Alliance and Progressive Conservative percentages from 2000.
Sources: Official Results, Elections Canada and Financial Returns, Elections Canada.

Parliament of Canada
Preceded by Electoral district created. See Beauport—Montmorency— Côte-de-Beaupré—Île-d'Orléans and Québec East	Member of Parliament for Beauport—Limoilou; 2004-2006	Succeeded by Sylvie Boucher, Conservative
