= Steeve Lavoie =

Canadian politician

Steeve Lavoie MP

Member of Parliament for Beauport—Limoilou
- Incumbent
- Assumed office April 28, 2025
- Preceded by: Julie Vignola

Personal details
- Born: February 21, 1975 (age 51) Notre-Dame-du-Lac, Quebec
- Party: Liberal
- Website: steevelavoie.liberal.ca

Steeve Lavoie MP is a Canadian politician from the Liberal Party of Canada. He was elected Member of Parliament for Beauport—Limoilou in the 2025 Canadian federal election by unseating incumbent Julie Vignola of the Bloc Québécois. Lavoie was previously the president and CEO of the Quebec Chamber of Commerce and Industry (CCIQ).

== Personal life ==
Lavoie is married and the father of four children, and also a grandfather. At the time of the 2025 Canadian federal election, he lived in Lévis, Quebec.

== Electoral record ==
2025 Canadian federal election: Beauport—Limoilou
Party	Candidate	Votes	%	±%	Expenditures
Liberal	Steeve Lavoie	21,858	35.59	+10.95	$26,930.97
Conservative	Hugo Langlois	18,492	30.11	–0.43	$62,202.58
Bloc Québécois	Julie Vignola	17,558	28.59	–2.47	$58,214.15
New Democratic	Raymond Côté	2,095	3.41	–6.30	$2,085.36
Green	Dalila Elhak	924	1.50	–0.53	$0.00
People's	Andrée Massicotte	396	0.64	+0.31	$0.00
Marxist–Leninist	Claude Moreau	95	0.15	–0.05	$0.00
Total valid votes		61,418	98.49	+0.72	$136,366.03
Total rejected ballots		939	1.51	–0.72	
Turnout		62,357	68.93	+3.51	
Eligible voters		90,470			
Liberal notional gain from Bloc Québécois		Swing		+6.71	
Source: Elections Canada
Note: number of eligible voters does not include voting day registrations.
