= Julie Vignola =

Canadian politician

Member of Parliament for Beauport—Limoilou
- In office October 21, 2019 – March 23, 2025
- Preceded by: Alupa Clarke
- Succeeded by: Steeve Lavoie

Personal details
- Born: Sept-Îles, Quebec, Canada
- Party: Bloc Québécois
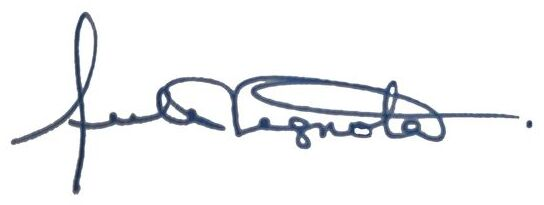
- Signature

Julie Vignola is a Canadian politician, who was elected to the House of Commons of Canada in the 2019 election. She represented Beauport—Limoilou as a member of the Bloc Québécois. The result was a surprise for Vignola, who "never anticipated such a result when she became a candidate".

From 2021 to 2025 she served as the critic of public services, procurement, government operations and tourism in the Bloc Québécois Shadow Cabinet.

In the 2025 Canadian federal election, she was unseated by Liberal candidate Steeve Lavoie.

In 2026, Vignola was reported to have sought the nomination for the Bloc Québécois in the by-election in Saint-Hyacinthe—Bagot—Acton.

== Electoral record ==
2025 Canadian federal election: Beauport—Limoilou
Party	Candidate	Votes	%	±%	Expenditures
Liberal	Steeve Lavoie	21,858	35.59	+10.95	$26,930.97
Conservative	Hugo Langlois	18,492	30.11	–0.43	$62,202.58
Bloc Québécois	Julie Vignola	17,558	28.59	–2.47	$58,214.15
New Democratic	Raymond Côté	2,095	3.41	–6.30	$2,085.36
Green	Dalila Elhak	924	1.50	–0.53	$0.00
People's	Andrée Massicotte	396	0.64	+0.31	$0.00
Marxist–Leninist	Claude Moreau	95	0.15	–0.05	$0.00
Total valid votes		61,418	98.49	+0.72	$136,366.03
Total rejected ballots		939	1.51	–0.72	
Turnout		62,357	68.93	+3.51	
Eligible voters		90,470			
Liberal notional gain from Bloc Québécois		Swing		+6.71	
Source: Elections Canada
Note: number of eligible voters does not include voting day registrations.

2021 Canadian federal election: Beauport—Limoilou
Party	Candidate	Votes	%	±%	Expenditures
Bloc Québécois	Julie Vignola	15,146	31.1	+0.9	$26,645.22
Conservative	Alupa Clarke	14,164	29.1	+2.8	$85,882.90
Liberal	Ann Gingras	12,378	25.4	-0.5	$59,305.19
New Democratic	Camille Esther Garon	5,075	10.4	-0.8	$13,578.99
Green	Dalila Elhak	1,025	2.1	-2.1	$1,599.40
Free	Lyne Verret	737	1.5	N/A	$416.50
Marxist–Leninist	Claude Moreau	119	0.2	±0.0	$0.00
Total valid votes/expense limit		48,644	97.8	–	$109,164.00
Total rejected ballots		1,134	2.2		
Turnout		49,778	65.0		
Registered voters		76,607			
Bloc Québécois hold		Swing		-1.0	
Source: Elections Canada

2019 Canadian federal election: Beauport—Limoilou
Party	Candidate	Votes	%	±%	Expenditures
Bloc Québécois	Julie Vignola	15,149	30.18	+15.41	none listed
Conservative	Alupa Clarke	13,185	26.27	-4.31	$83,296.15
Liberal	Antoine Bujold	13,020	25.94	+0.52	$68,905.79
New Democratic	Simon-Pierre Beaudet	5,599	11.16	-14.32	$9,394.55
Green	Dalila Elhak	2,127	4.24	+1.82	$1,410.36
People's	Alicia Bédard	1,033	2.06	–	none listed
Marxist–Leninist	Claude Moreau	78	0.16	-0.10	$0.00
Total valid votes/expense limit		50,191	97.53		
Total rejected ballots		1,272	2.47	+0.64	
Turnout		51,463	65.91	+0.56	
Eligible voters		78,080			
Bloc Québécois gain from Conservative		Swing		+9.86	
Source: Elections Canada
