= Beauport—Limoilou =

Federal electoral district in Quebec, Canada

Quebec electoral district
- Interactive map of riding boundaries from the 2025 federal election
- Coordinates: 46.842°N 71.221°W

Federal electoral district
- Legislature: House of Commons
MP
Steeve Lavoie
Liberal
- District created: 2003
- First contested: 2004
- Last contested: 2021
- District webpage: profile, map

Demographics
- Population (2016): 96,029
- Electors (2019): 78,080
- Area (km²): 33.44
- Pop. density (per km²): 2,871.7
- Census division(s): Quebec City
- Census subdivision(s): Quebec City (part)

Beauport—Limoilou is a federal electoral district in Quebec City, Quebec, Canada, that has been represented in the House of Commons of Canada by Liberal Party of Canada MP Steeve Lavoie since 2025.

The riding was created in 2003 as "Beauport" from parts of Beauport—Montmorency—Côte-de-Beaupré—Île-d'Orléans, Quebec and Quebec East ridings. It was renamed "Beauport—Limoilou" after the 2004 election.

== Geography ==
The riding, in the Quebec region of Capitale-Nationale, consists of the eastern part of Quebec City, namely the boroughs of Limoilou and most of Beauport.

The neighbouring ridings are Québec, Charlesbourg—Haute-Saint-Charles, Portneuf—Jacques-Cartier, Montmorency—Charlevoix—Haute-Côte-Nord, and Lévis—Bellechasse.

This riding lost territory to Beauport—Côte-de-Beaupré—Île d'Orléans—Charlevoix and gained territory from Montmorency—Charlevoix—Haute-Côte-Nord during the 2012 electoral redistribution.

Following the 2022 Canadian federal electoral redistribution, the Chutes-Montmorency neighbourhood was united into the riding, taking in parts from Beauport—Côte-de-Beaupré—Île d'Orléans—Charlevoix. It also gained territory from Charlesbourg—Haute-Saint-Charles south of a line that follows Rue de Chamonix, 10e Av. East, and Boul. Louix-XIV; and an additional territory south of a line that follows 41e Rue West, to Boul. Henri-Bourassa to Autoroute 40.

=== Former boundaries ===
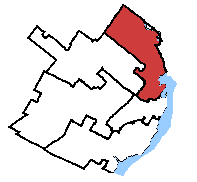
2004 to 2011 elections

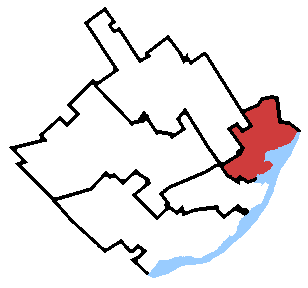
2015 to 2021 elections

== Demographics ==
According to the 2021 Canadian census, 2023 representation order

Race: 88.5% White, 5.0% Black, 1.9% Indigenous, 1.5% Latin American, 1.2% Arab
Languages: 93.5% French, 2.0% English, 1.2% Spanish
Religions: 65.4% Christian (57.5% Catholic, 7.8% Other), 2.6% Muslim, 31.2% None
Median income: $40,400 (2020)
Average income: $46,040 (2020)

== Members of Parliament ==
This riding has elected the following members of Parliament:

Parliament	Years	Member	Party
Beauport; Riding created from Beauport—Montmorency—Côte-de-Beaupré—Île-d'Orléans, Québec and Québec East
38th	2004–2006	Christian Simard	Bloc Québécois
Beauport—Limoilou
39th	2006–2008	Sylvie Boucher	Conservative
40th	2008–2011	Sylvie Boucher	Conservative
41st	2011–2015	Raymond Côté	New Democratic
42nd	2015–2019	Alupa Clarke	Conservative
43rd	2019–2021	Julie Vignola	Bloc Québécois
44th	2021–2025	Julie Vignola	Bloc Québécois
45th	2025–present	Steeve Lavoie	Liberal

== Election results ==
Graph of election results in Beauport, Beauport—Limoilou (minor parties that never got 2% of the vote or didn't run consistently are omitted)

=== Beauport—Limoilou ===
Graph of election results in Beauport—Limoilou (minor parties that never got 2% of the vote or didn't run consistently are omitted)

2025 Canadian federal election
Party	Candidate	Votes	%	±%
Liberal	Steeve Lavoie	21,858	35.59	+10.95
Conservative	Hugo Langlois	18,492	30.11	-0.43
Bloc Québécois	Julie Vignola	17,558	28.59	-2.47
New Democratic	Raymond Côté	2,095	3.41	-6.30
Green	Dalila Elhak	924	1.50	-0.53
People's	Andrée Massicotte	396	0.64	+0.31
Marxist–Leninist	Claude Moreau	95	0.15	-0.05
Total valid votes		61,418	98.49	
Total rejected ballots		939	1.51	-0.72
Turnout		62,357	68.93	+3.51
Eligible voters		90,470		
Liberal notional gain from Bloc Québécois		Swing		+6.71
Source: Elections Canada
Note: number of eligible voters does not include voting day registrations.

2021 federal election redistributed results
Party	Vote	%
Bloc Québécois	18,017	31.06
Conservative	17,714	30.54
Liberal	14,295	24.64
New Democratic	5,633	9.71
Green	1,183	2.04
Free	813	1.40
People's	193	0.33
Marxist-Leninist	119	0.21
Independent	43	0.07
Total valid votes	58,010	97.78
Rejected ballots	1,320	2.22
Registered voters/ estimated turnout	59,330	65.41

2021 Canadian federal election
Party	Candidate	Votes	%	±%	Expenditures
Bloc Québécois	Julie Vignola	15,146	31.1	+0.9	$26,645.22
Conservative	Alupa Clarke	14,164	29.1	+2.8	$85,882.90
Liberal	Ann Gingras	12,378	25.4	-0.5	$59,305.19
New Democratic	Camille Esther Garon	5,075	10.4	-0.8	$13,578.99
Green	Dalila Elhak	1,025	2.1	-2.1	$1,599.40
Free	Lyne Verret	737	1.5	N/A	$416.50
Marxist–Leninist	Claude Moreau	119	0.2	±0.0	$0.00
Total valid votes/expense limit		48,644	97.8	–	$109,164.00
Total rejected ballots		1,134	2.2		
Turnout		49,778	65.0		
Registered voters		76,607			
Bloc Québécois hold		Swing		-1.0	
Source: Elections Canada

2019 Canadian federal election
Party	Candidate	Votes	%	±%	Expenditures
Bloc Québécois	Julie Vignola	15,149	30.18	+15.41	none listed
Conservative	Alupa Clarke	13,185	26.27	-4.31	$83,296.15
Liberal	Antoine Bujold	13,020	25.94	+0.52	$68,905.79
New Democratic	Simon-Pierre Beaudet	5,599	11.16	-14.32	$9,394.55
Green	Dalila Elhak	2,127	4.24	+1.82	$1,410.36
People's	Alicia Bédard	1,033	2.06	–	none listed
Marxist–Leninist	Claude Moreau	78	0.16	-0.10	$0.00
Total valid votes/expense limit		50,191	97.53		
Total rejected ballots		1,272	2.47	+0.64	
Turnout		51,463	65.91	+0.56	
Eligible voters		78,080			
Bloc Québécois gain from Conservative		Swing		+9.86	
Source: Elections Canada

2015 Canadian federal election
Party	Candidate	Votes	%	±%	Expenditures
Conservative	Alupa Clarke	15,461	30.58	+5.30	$67,512.75
New Democratic	Raymond Côté	12,881	25.48	-20.42	$81,796.66
Liberal	Antoine Bujold	12,854	25.42	+19.06	$36,012.79
Bloc Québécois	Doni Berberi	7,467	14.77	-5.37	$10,571.92
Green	Dalila Elhak	1,220	2.41	+0.55	$1,343.81
Libertarian	Francis Bedard	423	0.84	–	$2,392.63
Marxist–Leninist	Claude Moreau	128	0.25	+0.02	–
Strength in Democracy	Bladimir Laborit	124	0.25	–	$1,075.02
Total valid votes/expense limit		50,558	98.17		$213,227.46
Total rejected ballots		941	1.83	–	
Turnout		51,499	65.35	–	
Eligible voters		78,799			
Conservative gain from New Democratic		Swing		+12.86	
Source: Elections Canada

2011 federal election redistributed results
Party	Vote	%
New Democratic	21,845	45.90
Conservative	12,030	25.28
Bloc Québécois	9,585	20.14
Liberal	3,024	6.35
Green	885	1.86
Others	220	0.46

2011 Canadian federal election
Party	Candidate	Votes	%	±%	Expenditures
New Democratic	Raymond Côté	24,306	46.07	+33.85	
Conservative	Sylvie Boucher	13,845	26.24	-10.52	
Bloc Québécois	Michel Létourneau	10,250	19.43	-13.18	
Liberal	Lorraine Chartier	3,162	5.99	-8.37	
Green	Louise Courville	950	1.80	-0.98	
Christian Heritage	Anne-Marie Genest	124	0.24	-	
Marxist–Leninist	Claude Moreau	122	0.23	-	
Total valid votes/expense limit		52,759	100.00		
Total rejected ballots		843	1.57	-0.14	
Turnout		53,602	63.26	+3.86	
Eligible voters		84,738	–	–	

2008 Canadian federal election
Party	Candidate	Votes	%	±%	Expenditures	
Conservative	Sylvie Boucher	17,994	36.76	-2.68	$48,176	
Bloc Québécois	Éléonore Mainguy	15,962	32.61	-5.26	$28,254	
Liberal	Yves Picard	7,030	14.36	+4.32	$19,558	
New Democratic	Simon-Pierre Beaudet	5,986	12.22	+4.24	$4,297	
Green	Luc Côté	1,363	2.78	-1.30	$0	
Independent	Simon Bédard	610	1.23	–	–	$5,911
Total valid votes/expense limit		48,945	100.00	$87,843		
Total rejected ballots		849	1.71			
Turnout		49,794	59.40			
Conservative hold		Swing		+1.29		

2006 Canadian federal election
Party	Candidate	Votes	%	±%	Expenditures
Conservative	Sylvie Boucher	19,409	39.54	+23.59	$46,042
Bloc Québécois	Christian Simard	18,589	37.87	-11.78	$47,991
Liberal	Yves Picard	4,929	10.04	-15.59	$29,000
New Democratic	Simon-Pierre Beaudet	3,917	7.98	+3.89	$3,095
Green	Mario Laprise	2,005	4.08	+0.68	$1,097
Marijuana	Jean Bedard	234	0.47	-0.79	
Total valid votes/expense limit		49,081	100.00	$82,093	

=== Beauport ===
2004 Canadian federal election
Party	Candidate	Votes	%	±%	Expenditures
Bloc Québécois	Christian Simard	22,989	49.65	–	$44,941
Liberal	Dennis Dawson	11,866	25.63	–	$60,945
Conservative	Stephan Asselin	7,388	15.96	–	$6,879
New Democratic	Xavier Trégan	1,896	4.09	–	$621
Green	Jeannine T. Desharnais	1,577	3.41	–	$252
Marijuana	Nicolas Frichot	585	1.26	–	
Total valid votes/expense limit		46,301	100.00	$81,041	

== See also ==
- List of Canadian electoral districts
- Historical federal electoral districts of Canada
