= Jacques Gourde =

Canadian politician

Jacques Gourde MP
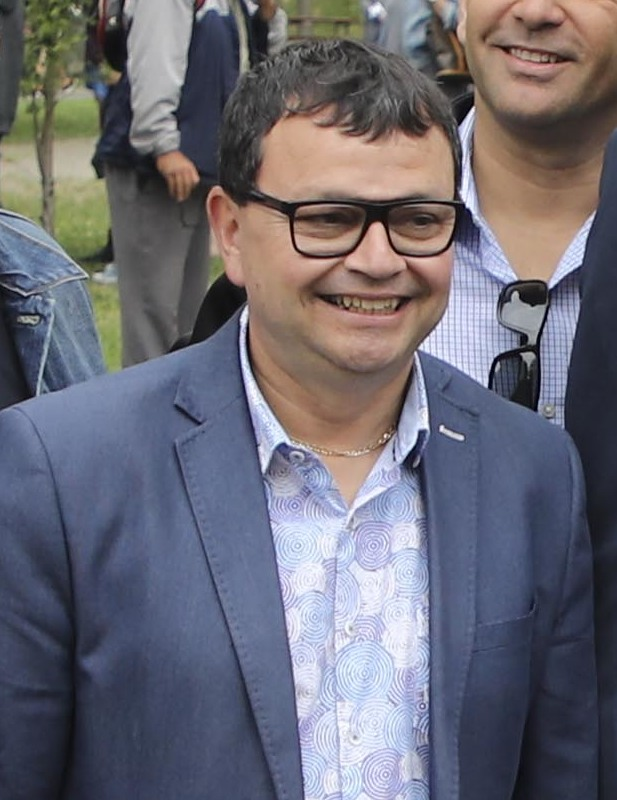

Member of Parliament for Lévis—Lotbinière Lotbinière—Chutes-de-la-Chaudière (2006–2015)
- Incumbent
- Assumed office January 23, 2006
- Preceded by: Odina Desrochers

Personal details
- Born: January 13, 1964 (age 62) Saint-Narcisse-de-Beaurivage, Quebec
- Party: Conservative
- Spouse: Chantal Gourde
- Profession: Farmer

Jacques Gourde MP (born January 13, 1964, in Saint-Narcisse-de-Beaurivage, Quebec) is a farmer and the Conservative Member of Parliament for Lévis—Lotbinière. He was first elected in the 2006 federal election and, on February 7, 2006, was appointed Parliamentary Secretary to the Minister of Agriculture and Agri-Food and Minister for the Canadian Wheat Board. Parliamentary Secretary to the Minister of Public Works and Government Services, for Official Languages and for the Economic Development Agency for the Regions of Quebec.

Gourde has a diploma in farming management and was a producer and exporter of hay in Saint-Narcisse-de-Beaurivage. He is married to Chantal Beaudoin and has five children.

== Electoral record ==
2025 Canadian federal election: Lévis—Lotbinière
Party	Candidate	Votes	%	±%	Expenditures
Conservative	Jacques Gourde	33,312	47.71	−1.99	
Liberal	Ghislain Daigle	20,549	29.43	+14.06	
Bloc Québécois	Pierre Julien	13,627	19.52	−3.30	
New Democratic	Molly Cornish	1,635	2.34	−4.94	
People's	Pier-Olivier Roy	698	1.00	−1.38	
Total valid votes/expense limit		69,821	98.72		
Total rejected ballots		906	1.28		
Turnout		70,727	76.76		
Eligible voters		92,136			
Conservative notional hold		Swing		−8.03	
Source: Elections Canada
Note: number of eligible voters does not include voting day registrations.

2021 Canadian federal election: Lévis—Lotbinière
Party	Candidate	Votes	%	±%	Expenditures
Conservative	Jacques Gourde	32,731	51.6	+7.0	$70,182.58
Bloc Québécois	Samuel Lamarche	13,740	21.7	-3.4	$6,762.35
Liberal	Ghislain Daigle	9,286	14.6	-2.4	$5,447.42
New Democratic	Guylaine Dumont	4,497	7.1	+0.2	$3,939.53
People's	Benoit Simard	1,661	2.6	-0.9	$0.00
Green	Charles-Eugène Bergeron	856	1.4	-1.6	$0.00
Free	Mariève Lemay	541	0.9	N/A	$488.27
Patriote	Carl Brochu	95	0.1	N/A	none listed
Total valid votes/expense limit		63,407	98.4	–	$120,042.23
Total rejected ballots		1,006	1.6		
Turnout		64,413	70.3		
Registered voters		91,618			
Conservative hold		Swing		+5.2	
Source: Elections Canada

2019 Canadian federal election: Lévis—Lotbinière
Party	Candidate	Votes	%	±%	Expenditures
Conservative	Jacques Gourde	28,297	44.57	-5.53	$40,916.04
Bloc Québécois	François-Noël Brault	15,921	25.08	+13.64	$5,169.30
Liberal	Ghislain Daigle	10,761	16.95	-4.72	$8,547.89
New Democratic	Christel Marchand	4,355	6.86	-7.91	$0.10
People's	Marc Fontaine	2,247	3.54	–	none listed
Green	Patrick Kerr	1,908	3.01	+1.21	$336.51
Total valid votes/expense limit		63,489	100.0		
Total rejected ballots		1,241	1.39		
Turnout		64,730	72.00		
Eligible voters		89,405			
Source: Elections Canada

2015 Canadian federal election: Lévis—Lotbinière
Party	Candidate	Votes	%	±%	Expenditures
Conservative	Jacques Gourde	31,357	50.1	+10.22	–
Liberal	Claude Boucher	13,562	21.7	+16.61	–
New Democratic	Hélène Bilodeau	9,246	14.8	-23.69	–
Bloc Québécois	Steve Gagné	7,163	11.4	-3.48	–
Green	Tina Biello	1,124	1.8	+0.14	–
Alliance of the North	François Belanger	136	0.2	–	–
Total valid votes/expense limit		62,588;	100.0		$226,181.44
Total rejected ballots		975	–	–	
Turnout		63,563	72.9	–	
Eligible voters		87,103			
Conservative hold		Swing		+16.96	
Source: Elections Canada

2011 Canadian federal election: Lotbinière—Chutes-de-la-Chaudière
Party	Candidate	Votes	%	±%	Expenditures
Conservative	Jacques Gourde	22,460	39.88	-7.39	$78,886.19
New Democratic	Tanya Fredette	21,683	38.50	+25.32	$1,427.87
Bloc Québécois	Gaston Gourde	8,381	14.88	-9.70	$28,148.35
Liberal	Nicole Larouche	2,866	5.09	-7.45	$4,858.38
Green	Richard Domm	936	1.66	-0.78	none listed
Total valid votes/expense limit		56,326	100.0		$89,473.12
Total rejected, unmarked and declined ballots		926	1.62	-0.10	
Turnout		57,252	69.21	+3.06	
Eligible voters		82,725			
Conservative hold		Swing		-16.36	

2008 Canadian federal election: Lotbinière—Chutes-de-la-Chaudière
Party	Candidate	Votes	%	±%	Expenditures
Conservative	Jacques Gourde	24,495	47.27	-7.07	$72,248.18
Bloc Québécois	Antoine Sarrazin-Bourgoin	12,738	24.58	-5.06	$19,089.72
New Democratic	Raymond Côté	6,828	13.18	+6.39	$2,654.50
Liberal	Marie-Thérèse Hovington	6,498	12.54	+7.11	$3,272.46
Green	Shirley Picknell	1,265	2.44	-1.37	none listed
Total valid votes/expense limit		51,824	100.0		$85,174
Total rejected, unmarked and declined ballots		908	1.72	+0.74	
Turnout		52,732	66.15	-2.21	
Eligible voters		79,721			
Conservative hold		Swing		-1.00	

2006 Canadian federal election: Lotbinière—Chutes-de-la-Chaudière
Party	Candidate	Votes	%	±%	Expenditures
Conservative	Jacques Gourde	28,236	54.34	+30.20	$45,970.43
Bloc Québécois	Odina Desrochers	15,402	29.64	-16.35	$61,218.95
New Democratic	Raymond Côté	3,529	6.79	+2.50	$2,346.22
Liberal	Éric Paradis	2,820	5.43	-16.02	$17,938.01
Green	Shirley Picknell	1,978	3.81	+0.14	none listed
Total valid votes/expense limit		51,965	100.0		$78,226
Total rejected, unmarked and declined ballots		513	0.98	-1.41	
Turnout		52,478	68.36		
Eligible voters		76,764			
Conservative gain from Bloc Québécois		Swing		+23.28	
