= Services Québec =

Services Québec is a Canadian government body that was created on January 25, 2004, by the Government of Québec. In creating Services Québec, the government of Québec changed how it provides services to the public.

Previously, the departments and bodies of the government of Québec responded to requests from citizens and businesses within the scope of their respective missions. As a result, citizens and businesses were required to take numerous steps, complete a number of forms and contact various persons.

Services Québec was established based on a more comprehensive approach and, as a result, is the gateway for access to government programs and services.

== Mission ==
The mission of Services Québec is to offer simplified access to public services for citizens and businesses.

== Operation ==
Services Québec is under the responsibility of the Minister of Employment and Social Solidarity, Minister of Labour and Minister responsible for the Status of Women, Agnès Maltais. Its acting Chief Executive Officer is Pierre E. Rodrigue.

Services Québec is a public body established as a legal person and its affairs are managed by a board of directors. It is made up of the acting Chief Executive Officer and 10 government-appointed members from various sectors.

Services Québec has 65 offices throughout the province. Several offices are located in the same building as service centres for the Société de l’assurance automobile du Québec. Certain locations also offer services for the Directeur de l’état civil, the enterprise register and the Québec land register.

== Services ==
Services Québec provides a variety of services to the Québec public.

=== My Québec Services Account ===
My Québec Services Account is a new way to provide government services.

It gives access to numerous information and transactional services provided by government departments and bodies. It also makes it possible to create a personal account and use it to save the information related to the steps taken with those departments and bodies. Lastly, it offers the possibility of saving a list of preferred services, as well as search results.

Once a person's identity has been verified by clicSÉQUR, the provincial government's identity authentication service, the transactions carried out in My Québec Services Account are confidential and secure.

Personalized itineraries
From My Québec Services Account, it is possible to create and save personalized itineraries: by completing a questionnaire at the time of a particular life event (for example, Becoming a Parent), users can obtain a list of the steps they have to take in their personal situation in order to obtain government services or fulfill obligations. It is also possible to enter personal notes and use the available follow-up options.

=== Gouvernement du Québec portal ===
Services Québec is responsible for the gouvernement du Québec portal, which presents essential information from various government departments and bodies.

In the Citizens section, information is presented according to the main events in life, such as Becoming a Parent, What to Do in the Event of Death, When a Couple Separates and Coping with a Loss of Independence.

In the Businesses section, a wealth of information is available on the formalities involved in starting or operating a business.

=== General information on government programs and services ===
Services Québec provides general information on government programs and services, which is available by phone or at one of Services Québec offices. The Répertoire des programmes et services (French only), which contains information on over 3000 subjects related to government programs and services and is updated regularly in collaboration with the departments and bodies, may also be consulted online.

=== Service québécois de changement d’adresse ===
By using the Service québécois de changement d’addresse, it is possible to notify the following six government departments and bodies of a change of address in one step:

- Directeur général des élections du Québec;
- Ministère de l'Emploi et de la Solidarité sociale;
- Revenu Québec;
- Régie de l'assurance maladie du Québec;
- Régie des rentes du Québec;
- Société de l'assurance automobile du Québec.

This service is available on the Internet, by phone and at all Services Québec offices.

=== Administration of Oaths ===
Certain administrative procedures require taking an oath. These include applications for loans and bursaries, in the case of students whose parents do not live in Canada; de facto spouse applications for certain pension plans; as well as applications for a change of name or a change of designation of sex, submitted to the Directeur de l’état civil.

These services are provided by a number of departments and bodies at their offices, but they are not always available to people living away from major centres. That is why Services Québec has acted to make them available throughout Québec. Accordingly, since 2009, there have been commissioners for oaths in the 65 offices under the banner of Services Québec.

=== Public registers ===
Services Québec provides services related to three registers that contain information on important life events: those involving private life (birth, marriage, death), implementation of a business project and the purchase of property.

Québec register of civil status
In Québec, the Directeur de l’état civil is authorized to issue authentic civil status documents, such as certificates and copies of acts of birth, marriage, civil union and death. The Directeur de l’état civil has been under the responsibility of Services Québec since April 1, 2008..

All of the services are offered by Internet, by mail and at Directeur de l’état civil offices located in Québec and Montréal.

Certain Directeur de l’état civil services are offered in Services Québec offices regionally:

- filing of applications for certificates or copies of acts of birth, marriage, civil union or death;
- validation of required supporting documents;
- payment of required fees.

Services Québec provides these services at the following offices:

- Drummondville
- Gaspé
- Gatineau
- Îles-de-la-Madeleine
- Joliette
- Laval
- Lévis
- Longueuil
- Rimouski
- Rouyn-Noranda
- Saguenay
- Sept-Îles
- Sherbrooke
- Saint-Jérôme
- Trois-Rivières

==== Entreprise register – consultation and registration ====
The enterprise register is a unique data bank where sole proprietorships, partnerships and legal persons are registered. The principal information on the identity of associations and businesses constituted in Québec or that operate in Québec is recorded, processed, stored and distributed. This information has legal value.

Under an agreement with the Québec Minister of Revenue, Services Québec is now responsible for the counter services of the enterprise registrar as well as the related telephone information services.

Consequently, Services Québec offices in Montréal and Québec provide the following services:

- registration of sole proprietorships, partnerships, associations and other groups;
- consultation of the enterprise register;
- replies to requests for general information.

Québec land register – registry offices
Under the land registration system, all transactions involving an immovable become public as soon as they are registered in the Québec land register. Since this is a public register, it can be consulted and used to retrace the history of the transactions involving a lot since the register's creation.

In many cases, the registry offices that provide Québec land register services are located in Services Québec offices. The following services are available there:

- receipt and processing of applications for registration in the Québec land register;
- receipt and processing of applications for copies of documents;
- billing and cash inflow activities.

=== Emergency measures ===
During a disaster such as a forest fire, flood or serious industrial accident, the Organisation de la Sécurité civile du Québec coordinates emergency measures in order to limit the consequences of the event and to protect the public. As part of civil protection, Services Québec and its government partners lend assistance in accordance with their responsibilities.

Services Québec : gateway to emergency information
Services Québec is the gateway to government information in an emergency situation. It is responsible for the “Communication” mission of the national civil protection plan, and coordinates communications for the government departments and bodies. Its role is to facilitate access to information that will enable the public to make the right decisions.

Services Québec

- provides information on the measures to take and the conduct to adopt, through Urgence Québec;
- answers questions and provides information on government programs and services, through its Centre de relations avec la clientèle;
- organizes public information sessions in the affected municipalities;
- produces and disseminates the information the public needs in various forms, for example guides and information pamphlets.

In addition, Services Québec supports government partners that provide emergency measures by:

- producing and disseminating press releases from civil protection officials;
- receiving and distributing requests for interviews from journalists;
- organizing press conferences for civil protection officials;
- accompanying elected representatives or journalists at disaster sites;
- advising government authorities on communication strategies and objectives.
