= Alupa Clarke =

Canadian politician (born 1986)

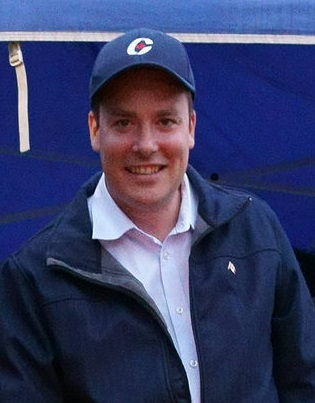

Member of Parliament for Beauport—Limoilou
- In office October 19, 2015 – September 11, 2019
- Preceded by: Raymond Côté
- Succeeded by: Julie Vignola

Shadow Minister for Official Languages and la Francophonie
- In office January 28, 2019 – September 11, 2019
- Leader: Andrew Scheer
- Preceded by: Steven Blaney
- Succeeded by: Chris d'Entremont

Official Opposition Critic for Veterans Affairs
- In office November 20, 2015 – October 16, 2016
- Leader: Rona Ambrose
- Succeeded by: John Brassard

Personal details
- Born: April 4, 1986 (age 40) Quebec City, Quebec
- Party: Conservative

Alupa Clarke (born April 4, 1986) is a Canadian politician. Clarke was elected to represent the riding of Beauport—Limoilou in the House of Commons of Canada in the 2015 Canadian federal election. He served on the Opposition bench as Shadow Minister for Official Languages and la Francophonie. Clarke was defeated in the 2019 Canadian federal election.

== Biography ==
Alupa A. Clarke was born in Quebec City on April 4, 1986. He is the second child of a mother from Beauport, Quebec, and a father from Vancouver.

Clarke grew up in New Brunswick before spending several years overseas. After graduating from high school, he returned to Canada.

Clarke completed a master's degree in political science at Laval University, writing a thesis on constitutional theories of the judicialization of politics. At the same time, he followed the family tradition of serving in the military as part of the 6th Field Artillery Regiment, based in Lévis, Quebec. Clarke's political involvement began in 2007, when he joined the Conservative Party of Canada.

Clarke spent eight years as an active member of the Conservative Party before being elected as a Member of Parliament. In addition to taking part in various election campaigns and numerous party events, Clarke was president of the Laval University Conservative association from 2013 to 2014 and president of the Beauport–Limoilou Conservative riding association in 2013. Finally, in 2013 he completed an internship with the issues management team in the Office of the Prime Minister of Canada.

Clarke is married and a father of two. He lives in Beauport with his wife, son and daughter.

== Political career ==
In the 2015 general election, following a long campaign during which he knocked on over 20,000 doors, Clarke was elected the MP for Beauport–Limoilou. Soon after, Rona Ambrose named him Official Opposition critic for veterans affairs (2015–2016) and, later, Official Opposition critic for public services and procurement (2016–2017). Clarke's parliamentary duties included sitting on the Standing Committee on Veterans Affairs (ACVA) and the Standing Committee on Government Operations and Estimates (OGGO).

In 2017, the new Conservative Leader, Andrew Scheer, appointed Clarke Shadow Cabinet Secretary for Official Languages and La Francophonie, and since September 2018, he served as Deputy Shadow Minister for Small Business and Export Promotion, Official Languages and la Francophonie and sat on the Standing Committee on Official Languages as Vice-Chair.

== Electoral record ==
2021 Canadian federal election: Beauport—Limoilou
Party	Candidate	Votes	%	±%	Expenditures
Bloc Québécois	Julie Vignola	15,146	31.1	+0.9	$26,645.22
Conservative	Alupa Clarke	14,164	29.1	+2.8	$85,882.90
Liberal	Ann Gingras	12,378	25.4	-0.5	$59,305.19
New Democratic	Camille Esther Garon	5,075	10.4	-0.8	$13,578.99
Green	Dalila Elhak	1,025	2.1	-2.1	$1,599.40
Free	Lyne Verret	737	1.5	N/A	$416.50
Marxist–Leninist	Claude Moreau	119	0.2	±0.0	$0.00
Total valid votes/expense limit		48,644	97.8	–	$109,164.00
Total rejected ballots		1,134	2.2		
Turnout		49,778	65.0		
Registered voters		76,607			
Bloc Québécois hold		Swing		-1.0	
Source: Elections Canada

2019 Canadian federal election: Beauport—Limoilou
Party	Candidate	Votes	%	±%	Expenditures
Bloc Québécois	Julie Vignola	15,149	30.18	+15.41	none listed
Conservative	Alupa Clarke	13,185	26.27	-4.31	$83,296.15
Liberal	Antoine Bujold	13,020	25.94	+0.52	$68,905.79
New Democratic	Simon-Pierre Beaudet	5,599	11.16	-14.32	$9,394.55
Green	Dalila Elhak	2,127	4.24	+1.82	$1,410.36
People's	Alicia Bédard	1,033	2.06	–	none listed
Marxist–Leninist	Claude Moreau	78	0.16	-0.10	$0.00
Total valid votes/expense limit		50,191	97.53		
Total rejected ballots		1,272	2.47	+0.64	
Turnout		51,463	65.91	+0.56	
Eligible voters		78,080			
Bloc Québécois gain from Conservative		Swing		+9.86	
Source: Elections Canada

2015 Canadian federal election: Beauport—Limoilou
Party	Candidate	Votes	%	±%	Expenditures
Conservative	Alupa Clarke	15,461	30.58	+5.3	–
New Democratic	Raymond Côté	12,881	25.48	-20.42	–
Liberal	Antoine Bujold	12,854	25.41	+19.06	–
Bloc Québécois	Doni Berberi	7,467	14.77	-5.37	–
Green	Dalila Elhak	1,220	2.41	+0.55	–
Libertarian	Francis Bedard	423	0.84	–	–
Marxist–Leninist	Claude Moreau	128	0.25	+0.02	–
Strength in Democracy	Bladimir Laborit	124	0.25	–	–
Total valid votes/Expense limit		50,558	100.0		$213,227.45
Total rejected ballots		941	–	–	
Turnout		51,499	–	–	
Eligible voters		78,601			
Conservative gain from New Democratic		Swing		+12.86	
Source: Elections Canada
