= List of Social Credit/Créditistes MPs =

This article lists Wikipedia articles about members of the Social Credit Party of Canada in the House of Commons of Canada

1935 17 MPs elected (15 Alberta, 2 Saskatchewan)

- John Horne Blackmore - Lethbridge, Alberta, party leader (1935–1944) elected 1935-1940 re-elected as New Democracy, re-elected as SC 1945-1949-1953-1957, def 1958
- Otto Buchanan Elliott - Kindersley, Saskatchewan, elected 1935
- Robert Fair - Battle River, Alberta, elected 1935-1940 re-elected as New Democracy, re-elected as SC 1945-1949-1953 (died 1954)
- William Samuel Hall - Edmonton East, Alberta, elected 1935 (died 1938, SC won by-election)
- Ernest George Hansell - Macleod, Alberta, elected 1935-1940-1945-1949-1953-1957, def 1958
- William Hayhurst - Vegreville, Alberta, elected 1935, def 1940 as New Democracy in Athabaska
- Norman Jaques - Wetaskiwin, Alberta, elected 1935-1940-1945 (died 1949)
- Charles Edward Johnston - Bow River, Alberta, elected 1935-1940-1945-1949-1953-1957, def 1958
- Walter Frederick Kuhl - Jasper—Edson, Alberta, elected 1935-1940 re-elected as New Democracy re-elected as SC 1945 as Social Credit, def 1949
- John Charles Landeryou - Calgary East, Alberta, elected 1935, def 1940
- James Alexander Marshall - Camrose, Alberta, elected 1935-1940-1945
- Archibald Hugh Mitchell - Medicine Hat, Alberta, elected 1935, def 1940 as New Democracy
- Joseph Needham - The Battlefords, Saskatchewan, elected 1935, def 1940
- René-Antoine Pelletier - Peace River, Alberta, elected, 1935, def 1940 New Democracy
- Eric Joseph Poole - Red Deer, Alberta, elected 1935
- Victor Quelch - Acadia, Alberta, elected 1935-1940-1945-1949-1953-1957
- Percy John Rowe - Athabaska, Alberta, elected, 1935, def 1940

1938 by-election switch

- Orvis A. Kennedy - Edmonton East, elected by-1938 (replacing Hall), def 1940 as New Democracy

1940 election 11 MPs elected (17-8+2)

In the 1940 federal election many Social Credit Party MPs ran for re-election under the New Democracy party led by former Conservative William Duncan Herridge as part of a joint effort. All 3 New Democracy candidates elected were Social Credit incumbents, Social Credit leader John Horne Blackmore and MPs Walter Frederick Kuhl and Robert Fair. The three continued to sit with the Social Credit Party following the election.

- Anthony Hlynka - Vegreville, Alberta, elected 1940-1945, def 1949
- Frederick Davis Shaw - Red Deer, Alberta, elected 1940-1945-1949-1953-1957, def 1958

1945 election 13 MPs elected

- Patrick Harvey Ashby - Edmonton East, Alberta, elected 1945, def 1949
- Solon Earl Low - Peace River, Alberta, party leader (1944–1961), elected 1945-1949-1953-1957, def 1958
- William Duncan McKay Wylie - Medicine Hat, Alberta, elected 1945-1949-1953

1946 by-election +1

- Réal Caouette - Pontiac, Quebec, elected by1946, def 1949 in Villeneuve as Union of Electors, ret. 1962-1963-1965 Témiscamingue 1968-1972-1974 (died 1976)

1949 election 10 MPs elected

- Hilliard Harris William Beyerstein - Camrose, Alberta, elected 1949
- Ray Thomas - Wetaskiwin, Alberta, elected 1949-1953-1957, def 1958

1953 election 16 MPs elected

- Frederick George Hahn - New Westminster, British Columbia, elected 1953-1957, def 1958
- Ambrose Holowach - Edmonton East, Alberta, elected 1953-1957, def 1958
- Bert Raymond Leboe - Cariboo, British Columbia, elected 1953-1957, def 1958, ret. 1962-1963-1965, def 1968
- George William McLeod - Okanagan—Revelstoke, British Columbia, elected 1953-1957, def 1958
- Alexander Bell Patterson - Fraser Valley, British Columbia, elected 1953-1957, def 1958, ret. 1962-1963-1965, def 1968, ret. as Progressive Conservative 1972-1974-1979-1980
- James Alexander Smith - Battle River—Camrose, Alberta, elected 1953-1957, def 1958
- Charles Yuill - Jasper—Edson, Alberta, elected 1953-1957, def 1958

1957 election 19 MPs elected

- Frank Claus Christian - Okanagan Boundary, British Columbia, elected 1957
- Thomas Irwin - Burnaby—Richmond, British Columbia, elected 1957, def 1958
- Horace Andrew (Bud) Olson - Medicine Hat, Alberta, elected 1957, def 1958 ret. 1962-1963-1965, change to Liberal 1968, def 1972
- Peter Stefura - Vegreville, Alberta, elected 1957, def 1958
- Sydney Herbert Stewart Thompson - Edmonton—Strathcona, Alberta, elected 1957, def 1958

1958 election 19-19=0

1962 election 30 MPs (26 Quebec, 2 Alberta, 2 British Columbia)

- Jean Robert Beaulé - Quebec East, elected 1962-1963 def 1965 as RC
- Louis-Philippe-Antoine Bélanger - Charlevoix, Quebec, elected 1962-1963
- André Bernier - Richmond—Wolfe, Quebec, elected 1962, def 1963
- Pierre-André Boutin - Dorchester, Quebec, elected 1962-1963, def 1965 as RC
- Gérard Chapdelaine - Sherbrooke, Quebec, elected 1962-1963, def 1965 as Independent
- Jean-Paul Cook - Montmagny—l'Islet, Quebec, elected 1962, def 1963
- Maurice Côté - Chicoutimi, Quebec, elected 1962-1963, def 1965 as Independent
- Charles-Eugène Dionne - Kamouraska, Quebec, elected 1962-1963, re-elected as RC 1965-1968, re-elected as SC 1972-1974, def 1979
- Bernard Dumont - Bellechasse, Quebec, elected 1962, def 1963, ret. 1968, def 1974
- Jean-Louis Frenette - Portneuf, Quebec, elected 1962-1963, def 1965 as Independent
- Philippe Gagnon - Rivière-du-Loup—Témiscouata, Quebec, elected 1962, def 1963
- Charles-Arthur Gauthier - Roberval, Quebec, elected 1962-1963, re-elected as RC 1965-1968, re-elected as SC 1972-1974-1979, def 1980
- Gilles Grégoire - Lapointe, Quebec, elected 1962-1963, re-elected as RC 1965
- Gérard Lamy - Saint-Maurice—Laflèche, Quebec, elected 1962, def 1963
- Raymond Langlois - Mégantic, Quebec, elected 1962-1963, re-elected as RC 1965, def 1968
- Gérard Laprise - Chapleau, Quebec, elected 1962-1963, re-elected as RC 1965 in Abitibi re-elected 1968, re-elected as SC 1972-1974
- Henry P. Latulippe - Compton—Frontenac, Quebec, elected 1962-1963, re-elected as RC 1965-1968, re-elected as SC 1972, def 1974
- Marcel Lessard - Lac-Saint-Jean, Quebec, elected 1962-1963, def as Independent 1965, ret as Liberal 1968-1972-1974-1979
- Lauréat Maltais - Saguenay, Quebec, elected 1962, def 1963
- Guy Marcoux - Québec—Montmorency, Quebec, elected 1962-1963, def 1965 as Independent
- David Ouellet - Drummond—Arthabaska, Quebec, elected 1962, def 1963
- Gérard Perron - Beauce, Quebec, elected 1962-1963, def 1965 as RC
- Lucien Plourde - Quebec West, Quebec, elected 1962-1963, def 1965 as RC
- Gilbert F. Rondeau -Shefford, Quebec, elected 1962-1963, def 1965 as RC, ret 1968, re-elected as SC 1972-1974, def as Independent 1979
- J.-Aurélien Roy - Lévis, Quebec, elected 1962, def 1963
- Robert N. Thompson - Red Deer, Alberta, party leader (1961–1967), elected 1962-1963-1965, re-elected 1968 as Prog. Con., def 1972 in Surrey—White Rock, British Columbia

1963 election 24 MPs.

Shortly after this election the party split into two camps, the Quebec-based Ralliement Créditiste led by Réal Caouette and consisting of 16 of the 19 Quebec Social Credit MPs and the Alberta-based Social Credit led by Robert N. Thompson. See Social Credit Party of Canada split, 1963

- Gérard Girouard - Labelle, Quebec, elected 1963, def 1965 in Hull as Prog. Con.
- Gérard Ouellet - Rimouski, Quebec, elected 1963, def 1965 as Prog. Con.

1965 election Party split 9 Ralliement Créditiste (Quebec); 5 Social Credit (2 Alberta, 3 British Columbia)

- Howard Earl Johnston (SC) - Okanagan—Revelstoke, British Columbia, 1965, def 1968, ret 1974 as Prog. Con.
- Roland Godin (R. Cr.) - Portneuf, Quebec, 1965–1968, re-elected 1972 as SC, def 1974
- Joseph Alcide Simard (R. Cr.) - Lac-Saint-Jean, Quebec, elected 1965, def 1968

1968 election 14 Ralliement Créditiste; 0 Social Credit

- Léonel Beaudoin - Richmond, Quebec, elected 1968, re-elected as SC 1972-1974
- André-Gilles Fortin - Lotbinière, Quebec, party leader (1976–1977), elected 1968, re-elected as SC 1972-1974 (died 1977)
- Joseph Adrien Henri Lambert - Bellechasse, Quebec, elected 1968, re-elected as SC 1972-1974-1979, def 1980
- René Matte - Champlain, Quebec, elected 1968, re-elected as SC 1972-1974, def as Independent 1979
- Romuald Rodrigue - Beauce, Quebec, elected 1968, def as SC 1972
- Oza Tétrault - Villeneuve, Quebec, elected 1968, re-elected as SC 1972

1972 election 15 (party reunited but all MPs elected are from Quebec)

- Eudore Allard - Rimouski, Quebec, elected 1972-1974-1979, def 1980
- Jean-Marie Boisvert- Drummond, Quebec, elected 1972, def 1974
- Gilles Caouette - Charlevoix, Quebec, elected 1972, def 1974, ret from Témiscamingue in 1977by, def 1979

1974 election 13 (Quebec only)

- Armand Caouette - Villeneuve, Quebec, elected 1974, def in Abitibi 1979

1978 by-election

- Richard Janelle - Lotbinière, Quebec, elected 1978-1979 def as Progressive Conservative 1980

1979 election 6 (Quebec only)

- Fabien Roy - Beauce, Quebec, party leader (1979–1980), elected 1979, def 1980

1980 election 0

No Social Credit MPs were elected in 1980 or subsequently.

== See also ==
- Canadian social credit movement
