= Social Credit Party =

The name Social Credit Party has been used by a number of political parties.

In Canada:

- Social Credit Party of Canada
- Manitoba Social Credit Party
- Parti crédit social uni
- Ralliement créditiste
- Ralliement créditiste du Québec
- Social Credit Party of Alberta
- Social Credit Party of Saskatchewan
- Social Credit Party of British Columbia
- Social Credit Party of Ontario

In the United Kingdom:

- Social Credit Party of Great Britain and Northern Ireland

In New Zealand:

- Social Credit Party (New Zealand)
- Social Credit-NZ

In Australia:

- Social Credit Party (Australia)

In Solomon Islands:

- Solomon Islands Social Credit Party

== See also ==
- Social credit (disambiguation)
- Canadian social credit movement
