= 1968 Canadian federal election =

- June 25, 1968

264 seats in the House of Commons 133 seats needed for a majority
- Opinion polls
- Turnout: 75.7% (▲0.9 pp)
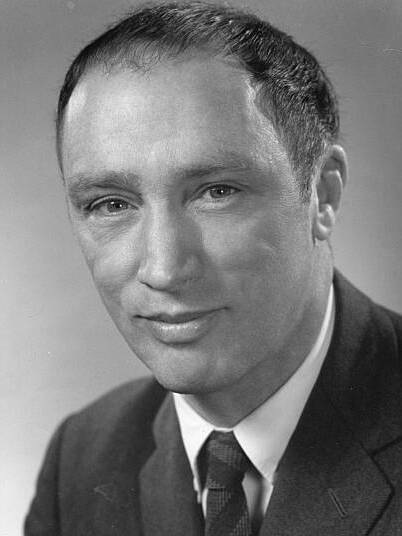

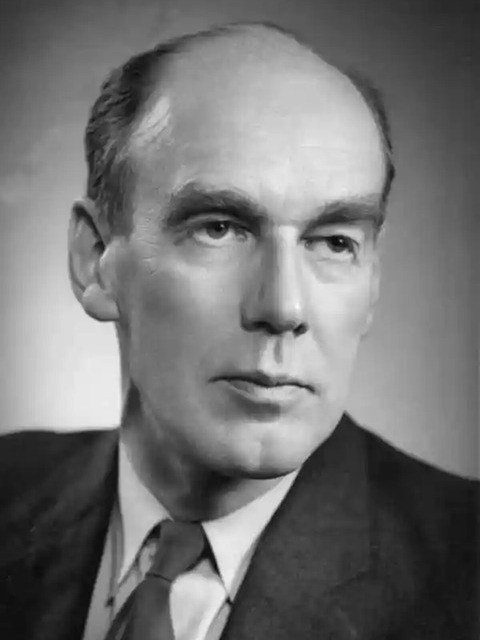

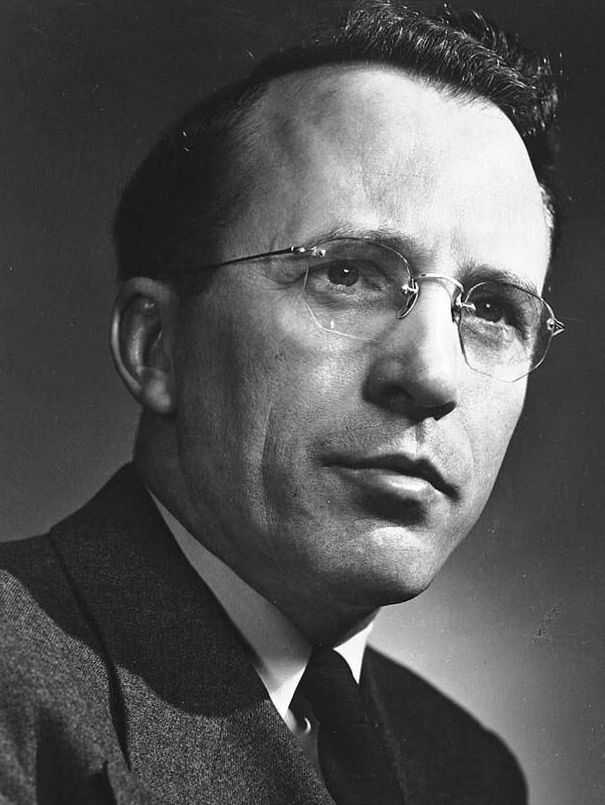

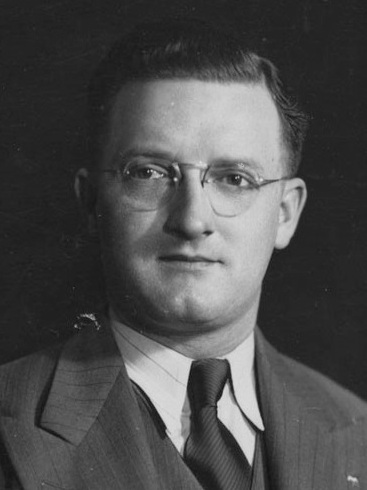

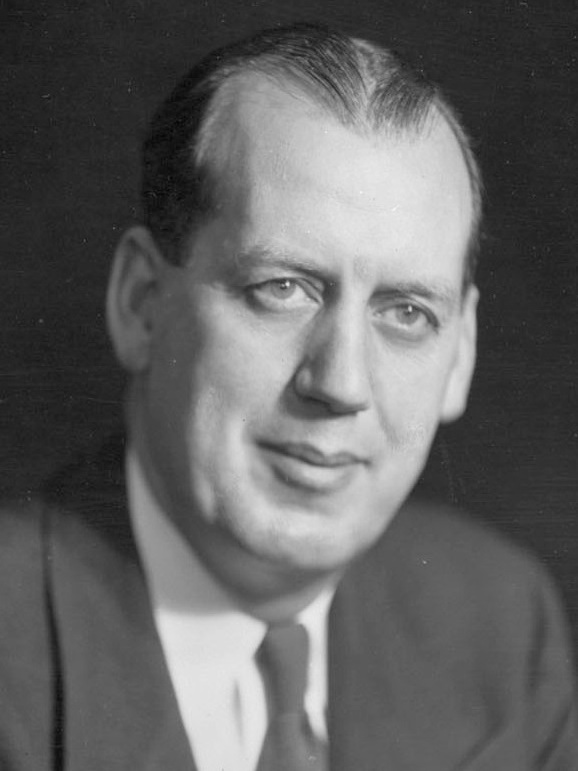
	First party	Second party	Third party
Leader	Pierre Trudeau	Robert Stanfield	Tommy Douglas
Party	Liberal	Progressive Conservative	New Democratic
Leader since	April 6, 1968	September 9, 1967	August 3, 1961
Leader's seat	Mount Royal	Halifax	Burnaby—Coquitlam; Ran in Burnaby—Seymour (lost)
Last election	131 seats, 40.18%	97 seats, 32.41%	21 seats, 17.91%
Seats before	128	94	22
Seats won	154	72	22
Seat change	▲26	▼22	0
Popular vote	3,686,801	2,554,397	1,378,263
Percentage	45.37%	31.43%	16.96%
Swing	▲5.18 pp	▼0.98 pp	▼0.95 pp
	Fourth party	Fifth party
Leader	Réal Caouette	A.B. Patterson
Party	Ralliement créditiste	Social Credit
Leader since	September 1, 1963	March 9, 1967
Leader's seat	Témiscamingue	Fraser Valley; Ran in Fraser Valley East (lost)
Last election	9 seats, 4.66%	5 seats, 3.66%
Seats before	8	3
Seats won	14	0
Seat change	▲6	▼3
Popular vote	360,404	68,742
Percentage	4.43% (Note: Only contested seats in Quebec and Restigouche—Madawaska in New Brunswick.)	0.85%
Swing	▼0.22 pp	▼2.82 pp
- Popular vote by province, with graphs indicating the number of seats won. As this is an FPTP election, seat totals are not determined by popular vote by province but instead via results by each riding.

- The Canadian parliament after the 1968 election
Prime Minister before election
Pierre Trudeau
Liberal
Prime Minister after election
Pierre Trudeau
Liberal

The 1968 Canadian federal election was held on June 25, 1968, to elect members of the House of Commons of Canada of the 28th Parliament of Canada.

In April 1968, Prime Minister Lester Pearson of the Liberal Party resigned as party leader as a result of declining health and failing to win a majority government in two attempts. He was succeeded by his Minister of Justice and Attorney General Pierre Trudeau, who called an election immediately after becoming prime minister. Trudeau's charisma appealed to Canadian voters; his popularity became known as "Trudeaumania" and helped him win a comfortable majority. Robert Stanfield's Progressive Conservatives lost seats whereas the New Democratic Party's support stayed the same.

== Background ==
Prime Minister Lester B. Pearson had announced in December 1967 that he would retire in early 1968, calling a new leadership election for April 1968 to decide on a successor. In February 1968, however, Pearson's government nearly fell before the leadership election could even take place, when it was unexpectedly defeated on a tax bill. Convention dictated that Pearson would have been forced to resign and call an election had the government been defeated on a full budget bill, but after taking legal advice, Governor General Roland Michener decreed that he would only ask for Pearson's resignation if an explicit motion of no confidence were called in his government. Ultimately, the New Democratic Party and Ralliement créditiste were not willing to topple the government over the issue, and even had they done so, Pearson would have been entitled to advise Michener not to hold an election until after the new Liberal leader had been chosen, but the incident made it clear that Pearson's successor could not feasibly hope to hold out until the next statutory general election date of November 1970, and would in all likelihood be forced to call an election much sooner.

Pierre Trudeau, a relatively unknown figure until he was appointed to Pearson's cabinet, won a surprise victory over Paul Martin Sr., Paul Hellyer and Robert Winters in the party's leadership election on April 6, 1968. He was sworn in as prime minister on April 20.

== Parties and campaigns ==
=== Liberals ===
As had been widely expected, Trudeau called an immediate election after he was sworn in as prime minister. Bilingual Trudeau soon captured the hearts and minds of the nation, the period leading up to the election being dubbed "Trudeaumania." The Liberal campaign was dominated by Trudeau's personality. Liberal campaign ads featured pictures of Trudeau inviting Canadians to "Come work with me", and encouraged them to "Vote for New Leadership for All of Canada". The substance of the campaign was based upon a proposed expansion of social programs.

=== Progressive Conservatives ===
The principal opposition to the Liberals was the Progressive Conservative Party (PC Party) led by Robert Stanfield, who had previously served as premier of Nova Scotia. The PCs started the election campaign with an internal poll showing them trailing the Liberals by 22 points.

Stanfield proposed introducing guaranteed annual income, though failed to explain the number of citizens that would be covered, the minimum income level, and the cost to implement it. Due to concerns that the term "guaranteed annual income" sounded socialist, he eventually switched to using the term "negative income tax". These mistakes made the policy hard for voters to understand and harmed the PCs. What also damaged the PCs was the idea of deux nations (meaning that Canada was one country housing two nations - French Canadians and English-speaking Canadians). Marcel Faribault, the PCs' Quebec lieutenant and MP candidate, was unclear on whether he supported or opposed deux nations and Stanfield did not drop him as a candidate. This led to the Liberals positioning themselves as the party that supported one Canada. In mid-June, they ran a full-page newspaper advertisement that implied that Stanfield supported deux nations; Stanfield called the ad "a deliberate lie" and insisted he supported one Canada.

=== New Democratic Party ===
On the left, former long-time Premier of Saskatchewan Tommy Douglas led the New Democratic Party. The ouster of Diefenbaker had damaged the PC brand in Saskatchewan and played a major role in allowing the NDP to overcome a decade of electoral failure at the federal level in Saskatchewan to win a plurality of seats there. Nevertheless, these gains were balanced out by losses elsewhere in the country. Under the slogan, "You win with the NDP", Douglas campaigned for affordable housing, higher old age pensions, lower prescription drug prices, and a reduced cost of living. However, the NDP had difficulty running against the left-leaning Trudeau, who was himself a former supporter of the NDP. Douglas would step down as leader in 1971, but remained a powerful icon for New Democrats.

=== Leaders' debate ===
This was the first Canadian federal election to hold a leaders debate, on June 9, 1968. The debate included Trudeau, Stanfield, Douglas, and in the latter part Réal Caouette, with Caouette speaking French and Trudeau alternating between the languages. A.B. Patterson, leader of the Social Credit Party was not invited to this debate. The assassination of Robert F. Kennedy three days before cast a pall over the proceedings, and the stilted format was generally seen as boring and inconclusive.

== Electoral system ==
In this election, for the first time since Confederation, all the MPs were elected as the single member for their district, through First past the post. Previously some had always been elected in multi-member ridings, such as in Halifax and the riding of Queen's (PEI), through plurality block voting. From here on, single-winner First past the post would be the only electoral system used to elect MPs.

=== Contests ===
No party fielded a full slate of candidates, and several anomalies arose:

- Lucien Lamoureux, Speaker of the House of Commons, opted to follow British tradition and stand for election as an Independent. The Liberals and PCs chose to respect that choice and not field candidates against him in Stormont—Dundas, but the NDP decided not to follow suit.
- John Mercer Reid, previously elected as a Liberal in Kenora—Rainy River, campaigned under the Liberal-Labour banner.
- Three ridings saw multiple candidates running under the same ticket:

- In Rocky Mountain, Douglas Caston and Hugh Gourley ran as PCs, and John McLeod and Collier Maberley stood as Independent Liberals.
- In Langelier, Guy Jean and Michel Roy ran as Créditistes.
- In Okanagan—Kootenay, Howard Earl Johnston and David Wilson McKechnie ran as Socreds

Candidate contests in the ridings
Candidates nominated	Ridings	Party										
Candidates nominated	Ridings	Lib (Note: Including Liberal-Labour)	PC	NDP	RC	SC	Comm	Ind-Lib	Ind-PC	Ind	Oth	Totals
2	1			1						1		2
3	131	131	131	130	1							393
4	97	97	96	97	46	26	5	2	4	9	6	388
5	27	27	27	27	18	6	8	5		10	7	135
6	7	7	8	7	6			3	1	7	3	42
7	1	1	1	1	1			1		2		7
Totals	264	263	263	263	72	32	13	11	5	29	16	967

== National results ==
The results of the election were sealed when on the night before the election a riot broke out at the St. Jean Baptiste Day parade in Montreal. Protesting the prime minister's attendance at the parade, supporters of Quebec independence yelled Trudeau au poteau [Trudeau to the gallows], and threw bottles and rocks. Trudeau, whose lack of military service during World War II had led some to question his courage, firmly stood his ground, and did not flee from the violence despite the wishes of his security escort. Images of Trudeau standing fast to the thrown bottles of the rioters were broadcast across the country, and swung the election even further in the Liberals' favour as many English-speaking Canadians believed that he would be the right leader to fight the threat of Quebec separatism.

The Social Credit Party, having lost two of the five seats it picked up at the previous election via defections (including former leader Robert N. Thompson, who defected to the Tories in March 1967), lost its three remaining seats. On the other hand, the Ralliement des créditistes (Social Credit Rally), the Québec wing of the party that had split from the English Canadian party, met with great success. The créditistes were a populist option appealing to social conservatives and Québec nationalists. They were especially strong in rural ridings and amongst poor voters. Party leader Réal Caouette campaigned against poverty, government indifference, and "la grosse finance" (big finance). The Canadian social credit movement would never win seats in English Canada again.

Atlantic Canada bucked the national trend, with the Tories making large gains in that region and winning pluralities in all four Atlantic provinces. In that region, the Tory brand was strengthened by the leadership of former Nova Scotian premier Stanfield. Voters in Newfoundland, who were growing increasingly weary of their Liberal administration under founding Premier Joey Smallwood, voted PC for the first time since entering Confederation.

This was the last election until 1993 in which the Liberals won at least 150 seats.

Party	Party leader	# of candidates	Seats				Popular vote		
Party	Party leader	# of candidates	1965	Dissolution	Elected	% Change	#	%	Change
Liberal	Pierre Trudeau	262	131	128	154	+18.3%	3,686,801	45.37%	+5.18pp
Progressive Conservative	Robert Stanfield	263	97	94	72	-25.8%	2,554,397	31.43%	-0.98pp
New Democratic Party	Tommy Douglas	263	21	22	22	+4.8%	1,378,263	16.96%	-0.95pp
Ralliement créditiste	Réal Caouette	72	9	8	14	+55.6%	360,404	4.43%	-0.22pp
Independent		29	1	2	1	-	36,543	0.45%	-0.23pp
Liberal-Labour	Pierre Trudeau (Note: John Mercer Reid won as a Liberal-Labour candidate but remained a member of the Liberal Party caucus, led by Pierre Trudeau.)	1			1		10,144	0.12%	
Social Credit	A.B. Patterson	32	5	4	-	-100%	68,742	0.85%	-2.82pp
Independent Liberal		11	-	-	-	-	16,785	0.21%	-0.01pp
Communist	William Kashtan	14	-	-	-	-	4,465	0.05%	x
Independent PC		5	1	-	-	-100%	2,762	0.03%	-0.14pp
Démocratisation Économique		5			-		2,651	0.03%	
Franc Lib		1			-		2,141	0.03%	
Independent Conservative		1	-	-	-	-	632	0.01%	x
Reform		1			-		420	0.01%	
Rhinoceros	Cornelius I	1			-		354	x	x
Conservative		1	-	-	-	-	339	x	x
Esprit social	H-G Grenier	1	-	-	-	-	311	x	x
Socialist Labour		1	-	-	-	-	202	x	x
Republican (Note: The Republican Party also took credit for a second candidate, who received 420 votes. (Vancouver Sun, June 26, 1968, "Republicans Claim Win", p. 15))		1			-		175	x	
New Canada	Fred Reiner	1			-		148	x	
National Socialist		1			-		89	x	
Vacant				6					
Total		967	265	265	264	-0.4%	8,126,768	100%	
Sources: http://www.elections.ca History of Federal Ridings since 1867, Toronto Star, June 24, 1968.

Notes:

"% change" refers to change from previous election

x - less than 0.005% of the popular vote

"Dissolution" refers to party standings in the House of Commons immediately prior to the election call, not the results of the previous election.

=== Synopsis of results ===
1968 Canadian federal election – synopsis of riding results
Electoral district		Winning party							Votes									
Province	Name	1st place	Votes	Share	Margin #	Margin %	2nd place	3rd place	Lib (Note: Including Liberal-Labour candidate)	PC	NDP	RC	SC	Ind-Lib	Ind-PC	Ind	Oth	Total
AB	Athabasca	PC	8,852	47.10%	1,226	6.52%	Lib	NDP	7,626	8,852	2,315	–	–	–	–	–	–	18,793
AB	Battle River	PC	15,725	64.36%	11,601	47.48%	Lib	SC	4,124	15,725	1,827	–	2,756	–	–	–	–	24,432
AB	Calgary Centre	PC	16,977	47.07%	301	0.83%	Lib	NDP	16,676	16,977	2,413	–	–	–	–	–	–	36,066
AB	Calgary North	PC	21,708	49.86%	3,523	8.09%	Lib	NDP	18,185	21,708	3,648	–	–	–	–	–	–	43,541
AB	Calgary South	Lib	20,472	47.62%	756	1.76%	PC	NDP	20,472	19,716	2,798	–	–	–	–	–	–	42,986
AB	Crowfoot	PC	16,508	73.45%	11,725	52.17%	Lib	NDP	4,783	16,508	1,185	–	–	–	–	–	–	22,476
AB	Edmonton Centre	PC	12,062	34.62%	251	0.72%	Lib	Ind-Lib	11,811	12,062	3,054	–	–	7,912 (Note: William Hawrelak was previously Mayor of Edmonton.)	–	–	–	34,839
AB	Edmonton East	PC	15,764	46.09%	3,025	8.84%	Lib	NDP	12,739	15,764	5,292	–	–	–	–	–	410	34,205
AB	Edmonton West	PC	19,612	49.39%	2,306	5.81%	Lib	NDP	17,306	19,612	2,793	–	–	–	–	–	–	39,711
AB	Edmonton—Strathcona	Lib	21,074	52.35%	5,846	14.52%	PC	NDP	21,074	15,228	2,745	–	–	–	–	1,206	–	40,253
AB	Lethbridge	PC	11,901	44.95%	3,708	14.00%	Lib	SC	8,193	11,901	2,442	–	3,941	–	–	–	–	26,477
AB	Medicine Hat	Lib	9,015	36.85%	206	0.84%	PC	SC	9,015 (Note: Bud Olson was previously elected as Social Credit in 1965.)	8,809	2,401	–	4,237	–	–	–	–	24,462
AB	Palliser	PC	16,967	60.32%	7,820	27.80%	Lib	NDP	9,147	16,967	2,014	–	–	–	–	–	–	28,128
AB	Peace River	PC	11,825	55.58%	6,995	32.88%	NDP	Lib	4,620	11,825	4,830	–	–	–	–	–	–	21,275
AB	Pembina	PC	17,578	58.82%	8,236	27.56%	Lib	NDP	9,342	17,578	2,963	–	–	–	–	–	–	29,883
AB	Red Deer	PC	17,930	62.21%	9,389	32.58%	Lib	NDP	8,541	17,930 (Note: Robert N. Thompson was previously elected as Social Credit in 1965.)	2,349	–	–	–	–	–	–	28,820
AB	Rocky Mountain	Lib	7,355	37.69%	1,563	8.01%	PC	PC	7,355	9,377 (Note: Douglas Caston was previously elected in a 1967 byelection for the abolished riding of Jasper—Edson. He received 3,585 votes in 1968.)	2,093	–	–	687	–	–	–	19,512
AB	Vegreville	PC	15,855	64.59%	10,789	43.95%	Lib	NDP	5,066	15,855	2,277	–	–	–	1,349	–	–	24,547
AB	Wetaskiwin	PC	15,178	64.78%	10,208	43.57%	Lib	NDP	4,970	15,178	3,281	–	–	–	–	–	–	23,429
BC	Burnaby—Richmond	Lib	16,182	42.44%	1,712	4.49%	NDP	PC	16,182	5,035	14,470	–	2,445	–	–	–	–	38,132
BC	Burnaby—Seymour	Lib	17,891	45.23%	138	0.35%	NDP	PC	17,891	3,206	17,753	–	702	–	–	–	–	39,552
BC	Capilano	Lib	28,292	66.37%	20,982	49.22%	PC	NDP	28,292	7,310	6,279	–	745	–	–	–	–	42,626
BC	Coast Chilcotin	Lib	10,292	47.31%	2,815	12.94%	NDP	PC	10,292	2,355	7,477	–	1,629	–	–	–	–	21,753
BC	Comox—Alberni (Note: Election invalidated because of ballots cast by ineligible voters. A byelection was held in 1969.)	Lib	11,939	39.36%	9	0.03%	NDP	PC	11,939	5,154	11,930	–	997	–	–	–	311	30,331
BC	Esquimalt—Saanich	Lib	16,501	39.48%	2,914	6.97%	PC	NDP	16,501	13,587	10,952	–	751	–	–	–	–	41,791
BC	Fraser Valley East	Lib	9,689	34.74%	1,654	5.93%	SC	NDP	9,689	3,514	6,654	–	8,035	–	–	–	–	27,892
BC	Fraser Valley West	NDP	14,410	39.61%	665	1.83%	Lib	PC	13,745	4,997	14,410	–	3,224	–	–	–	–	36,376
BC	Kamloops—Cariboo	Lib	13,000	40.48%	3,296	10.26%	PC	NDP	13,000	9,704	7,566	–	1,842	–	–	–	–	32,112
BC	Kootenay West	NDP	12,181	44.95%	4,413	16.28%	Lib	PC	7,768	4,457	12,181	–	2,693	–	–	–	–	27,099
BC	Nanaimo—Cowichan—The Islands	NDP	15,273	41.71%	3,895	10.64%	Lib	PC	11,378	8,773	15,273	–	1,193	–	–	–	–	36,617
BC	New Westminster	Lib	18,083	44.52%	1,939	4.77%	NDP	PC	18,083	4,761	16,144	–	1,382	–	–	–	251	40,621
BC	Okanagan Boundary	Lib	12,321	32.67%	1,630	4.32%	PC	NDP	12,321	10,691	10,481	–	4,217	–	–	–	–	37,710
BC	Okanagan—Kootenay	Lib	11,370	35.99%	1,818	5.75%	NDP	SC	11,370	–	9,552	–	10,674 (Note: Howard Earl Johnston was previously elected in Okanagan—Revelstoke in 1965. He received 5,837 votes in 1968.)	–	–	–	–	31,596
BC	Prince George—Peace River	Lib	10,926	34.92%	1,633	5.22%	PC	NDP	10,926	9,293	6,894	–	3,776	–	–	402	–	31,291
BC	Skeena	NDP	12,471	52.19%	4,597	19.24%	Lib	PC	7,874	3,552	12,471	–	–	–	–	–	–	23,897
BC	Surrey	NDP	16,186	44.56%	4,445	12.24%	Lib	PC	11,741	5,953	16,186	–	2,445	–	–	–	–	36,325
BC	Vancouver Centre	Lib	25,426	56.10%	14,275	31.50%	NDP	PC	25,426	8,326	11,151	–	–	–	–	–	420	45,323
BC	Vancouver East	NDP	13,339	50.02%	3,589	13.46%	Lib	PC	9,750	2,377	13,339	–	726	–	–	–	477	26,669
BC	Vancouver Kingsway	NDP	15,599	49.55%	4,764	15.13%	Lib	PC	10,835	3,285	15,599	–	1,760	–	–	–	–	31,479
BC	Vancouver Quadra	Lib	20,788	54.29%	9,184	23.98%	PC	NDP	20,788	11,604	5,727	–	–	–	–	–	175	38,294
BC	Vancouver South	Lib	19,757	49.26%	10,236	25.52%	PC	NDP	19,757	9,521	9,086	–	1,585	–	–	–	157	40,106
BC	Victoria	Lib	18,401	43.90%	4,823	11.51%	PC	NDP	18,401	13,578	9,414	–	–	–	–	526	–	41,919
MB	Brandon—Souris	PC	15,060	51.83%	5,097	17.54%	Lib	NDP	9,963	15,060	4,031	–	–	–	–	–	–	29,054
MB	Churchill	PC	9,009	41.77%	1,336	6.19%	Lib	NDP	7,673	9,009	4,888	–	–	–	–	–	–	21,570
MB	Dauphin	PC	8,701	37.18%	1,931	8.25%	Lib	NDP	6,770	8,701	6,737	–	1,194	–	–	–	–	23,402
MB	Lisgar	PC	11,785	51.68%	4,037	17.70%	Lib	SC	7,748	11,785	1,305	–	1,350	–	–	614	–	22,802
MB	Marquette	PC	12,706	48.62%	3,523	13.48%	Lib	NDP	9,183	12,706	3,651	–	–	–	–	593	–	26,133
MB	Portage	Lib	8,415	42.88%	390	1.99%	PC	NDP	8,415	8,025	3,184	–	–	–	–	–	–	19,624
MB	Provencher	Lib	9,021	41.64%	1,230	5.68%	PC	NDP	9,021	7,791	3,078	–	1,773	–	–	–	–	21,663
MB	Selkirk	NDP	17,310	44.59%	5,290	13.63%	Lib	PC	12,020	8,781	17,310	–	707	–	–	–	–	38,818
MB	St. Boniface	Lib	22,032	51.72%	10,466	24.57%	NDP	PC	22,032	8,048	11,566	–	949	–	–	–	–	42,595
MB	Winnipeg North	NDP	15,608	45.47%	963	2.81%	Lib	PC	14,645	3,206	15,608	–	–	–	–	–	869	34,328
MB	Winnipeg North Centre	NDP	14,880	49.07%	3,557	11.73%	Lib	PC	11,323	4,124	14,880	–	–	–	–	–	–	30,327
MB	Winnipeg South	Lib	23,457	53.11%	8,248	18.68%	PC	NDP	23,457	15,209	5,499	–	–	–	–	–	–	44,165
MB	Winnipeg South Centre	Lib	23,775	51.78%	10,507	22.88%	PC	NDP	23,775	13,268 (Note: Duff Roblin was previously Premier of Manitoba)	8,240	–	–	–	–	–	632	45,915
NB	Carleton—Charlotte	PC	15,469	62.76%	7,139	28.96%	Lib	NDP	8,330	15,469	848	–	–	–	–	–	–	24,647
NB	Fundy—Royal	PC	17,013	61.28%	7,578	27.29%	Lib	NDP	9,435	17,013	1,316	–	–	–	–	–	–	27,764
NB	Gloucester	Lib	12,196	55.03%	3,236	14.60%	PC	NDP	12,196	8,960	1,007	–	–	–	–	–	–	22,163
NB	Madawaska—Victoria	Lib	9,924	50.01%	383	1.93%	PC	NDP	9,924	9,541	379	–	–	–	–	–	–	19,844
NB	Moncton	PC	17,969	50.10%	2,956	8.24%	Lib	NDP	15,013	17,969	2,332	–	–	–	–	553	–	35,867
NB	Northumberland—Miramichi	Lib	10,292	52.96%	2,439	12.55%	PC	NDP	10,292	7,853	1,290	–	–	–	–	–	–	19,435
NB	Restigouche	Lib	9,991	51.09%	2,942	15.04%	PC	RC	9,991	7,049	748	1,769	–	–	–	–	–	19,557
NB	Saint John—Lancaster	PC	15,756	53.06%	3,596	12.11%	Lib	NDP	12,160	15,756	1,508	–	–	–	268	–	–	29,692
NB	Westmorland—Kent	Lib	11,519	53.32%	3,254	15.06%	PC	NDP	11,519	8,265	1,821	–	–	–	–	–	–	21,605
NB	York—Sunbury	PC	17,394	55.39%	4,411	14.05%	Lib	NDP	12,983	17,394	1,028	–	–	–	–	–	–	31,405
NF	Bonavista—Trinity—Conception	PC	14,823	58.27%	4,741	18.64%	Lib	NDP	10,082	14,823	532	–	–	–	–	–	–	25,437
NF	Burin—Burgeo	Lib	8,674	58.32%	3,234	21.75%	PC	NDP	8,674	5,440	758	–	–	–	–	–	–	14,872
NF	Gander—Twillingate	PC	10,601	53.09%	1,585	7.94%	Lib	NDP	9,016	10,601	352	–	–	–	–	–	–	19,969
NF	Grand Falls—White Bay—Labrador	PC	10,322	50.40%	735	3.59%	Lib	NDP	9,587	10,322	571	–	–	–	–	–	–	20,480
NF	Humber—St. George's—St. Barbe	PC	9,765	43.36%	283	1.26%	Lib	NDP	9,482	9,765	3,276	–	–	–	–	–	–	22,523
NF	St. John's East	PC	18,153	60.93%	7,595	25.49%	Lib	NDP	10,558	18,153	956	–	126	–	–	–	–	29,793
NF	St. John's West	PC	15,379	56.69%	4,229	15.59%	Lib	NDP	11,150	15,379	597	–	–	–	–	–	–	27,126
NS	Annapolis Valley	PC	17,435	56.64%	5,093	16.54%	Lib	NDP	12,342	17,435	1,007	–	–	–	–	–	–	30,784
NS	Cape Breton Highlands—Canso	Lib	13,725	50.16%	530	1.94%	PC	NDP	13,725	13,195	445	–	–	–	–	–	–	27,365
NS	Cape Breton—East Richmond	PC	11,583	41.94%	3,299	11.95%	Lib	NDP	8,284	11,583	7,749	–	–	–	–	–	–	27,616
NS	Cape Breton—The Sydneys	PC	14,971	51.73%	4,428	15.30%	Lib	NDP	10,543	14,971	3,426	–	–	–	–	–	–	28,940
NS	Central Nova	PC	16,720	58.57%	7,221	25.29%	Lib	NDP	9,499	16,720	2,330	–	–	–	–	–	–	28,549
NS	Cumberland—Colchester North	PC	18,446	60.92%	8,307	27.43%	Lib	NDP	10,139	18,446	1,696	–	–	–	–	–	–	30,281
NS	Dartmouth—Halifax East	PC	19,694	55.17%	5,265	14.75%	Lib	NDP	14,429	19,694	1,572	–	–	–	–	–	–	35,695
NS	Halifax	PC	19,569	60.33%	8,014	24.71%	Lib	NDP	11,555	19,569	1,314	–	–	–	–	–	–	32,438
NS	Halifax—East Hants	PC	22,323	59.48%	8,835	23.54%	Lib	NDP	13,488	22,323	1,718	–	–	–	–	–	–	37,529
NS	South Shore	PC	17,547	58.53%	5,879	19.61%	Lib	NDP	11,668	17,547	764	–	–	–	–	–	–	29,979
NS	South Western Nova	PC	14,543	52.35%	2,253	8.11%	Lib	NDP	12,290	14,543	655	–	–	–	293	–	–	27,781
ON	Algoma	Lib	9,542	50.57%	4,272	22.64%	PC	NDP	9,542	5,270	4,057	–	–	–	–	–	–	18,869
ON	Brant	Lib	16,029	39.81%	3,696	9.18%	NDP	PC	16,029	11,901	12,333	–	–	–	–	–	–	40,263
ON	Broadview	NDP	10,406	41.15%	477	1.89%	Lib	PC	9,929	4,752	10,406	–	–	–	–	–	202	25,289
ON	Bruce	Lib	12,775	46.69%	1,101	4.02%	PC	NDP	12,775	11,674	2,911	–	–	–	–	–	–	27,360
ON	Cochrane	Lib	9,803	48.66%	2,769	13.75%	NDP	PC	9,803	2,875	7,034	–	433	–	–	–	–	20,145
ON	Davenport	Lib	10,736	50.43%	4,871	22.88%	NDP	PC	10,736	4,688	5,865	–	–	–	–	–	–	21,289
ON	Don Valley	Lib	27,335	51.04%	4,976	9.29%	PC	NDP	27,335	22,359 (Note: Dalton Camp was previously president of the party. This was his second attempt to seek elective office.)	3,863	–	–	–	–	–	–	53,557
ON	Eglinton	Lib	23,215	59.24%	12,060	30.77%	PC	NDP	23,215	11,155	4,654	–	–	–	–	164	–	39,188
ON	Elgin	Lib	12,856	44.51%	1,057	3.66%	PC	NDP	12,856	11,799	4,227	–	–	–	–	–	–	28,882
ON	Essex	Lib	14,707	49.70%	5,308	17.94%	NDP	PC	14,707	5,485	9,399	–	–	–	–	–	–	29,591
ON	Etobicoke	Lib	32,066	55.96%	14,267	24.90%	PC	NDP	32,066	17,799	7,432	–	–	–	–	–	–	57,297
ON	Fort William	Lib	10,635	42.01%	3,241	12.80%	NDP	PC	10,635	7,284	7,394	–	–	–	–	–	–	25,313
ON	Frontenac—Lennox and Addington	PC	11,801	47.10%	1,848	7.38%	Lib	NDP	9,953	11,801	2,730	–	–	–	571	–	–	25,055
ON	Glengarry—Prescott	Lib	14,970	62.01%	7,406	30.68%	PC	NDP	14,970	7,564	1,606	–	–	–	–	–	–	24,140
ON	Greenwood	NDP	12,117	37.70%	362	1.13%	Lib	PC	11,755	8,268	12,117	–	–	–	–	–	–	32,140
ON	Grenville—Carleton	Lib	21,250	48.32%	2,407	5.47%	PC	NDP	21,250	18,843	3,887	–	–	–	–	–	–	43,980
ON	Grey—Simcoe	PC	13,146	47.00%	1,942	6.94%	Lib	NDP	11,204	13,146	3,623	–	–	–	–	–	–	27,973
ON	Halton	Lib	17,837	48.13%	5,223	14.09%	PC	NDP	17,837	12,614	6,606	–	–	–	–	–	–	37,057
ON	Halton—Wentworth	Lib	19,563	41.34%	1,520	3.21%	PC	NDP	19,563	18,043	9,312	–	–	399	–	–	–	47,317
ON	Hamilton East	Lib	15,273	50.22%	6,063	19.94%	NDP	PC	15,273	5,633	9,210	–	–	–	–	–	297	30,413
ON	Hamilton Mountain	Lib	17,794	41.18%	2,956	6.84%	NDP	PC	17,794	10,583	14,838	–	–	–	–	–	–	43,215
ON	Hamilton West	PC	13,580	40.38%	342	1.02%	Lib	NDP	13,238	13,580	6,809	–	–	–	–	–	–	33,627
ON	Hamilton—Wentworth	Lib	14,979	39.53%	2,127	5.61%	NDP	PC	14,979	10,059	12,852	–	–	–	–	–	–	37,890
ON	Hastings	PC	13,555	49.07%	2,680	9.70%	Lib	NDP	10,875	13,555	3,195	–	–	–	–	–	–	27,625
ON	High Park	Lib	16,260	42.52%	5,517	14.43%	PC	NDP	16,260	10,743	8,131	–	–	2,895 (Note: Ralph Cowan was previously Liberal MP for York—Humber.)	–	215	–	38,244
ON	Huron	PC	14,652	54.62%	3,692	13.76%	Lib	NDP	10,960	14,652	1,212	–	–	–	–	–	–	26,824
ON	Kenora—Rainy River	Lib-Lab	10,144	49.46%	4,433	21.61%	NDP	PC	10,144	4,655	5,711	–	–	–	–	–	–	20,510
ON	Kent—Essex	PC	15,195	49.33%	2,118	6.88%	Lib	NDP	13,077	15,195	2,528	–	–	–	–	–	–	30,800
ON	Kingston and the Islands	Lib	16,234	49.69%	4,435	13.58%	PC	NDP	16,234	11,799	4,636	–	–	–	–	–	–	32,669
ON	Kitchener	Lib	16,471	40.68%	3,672	9.07%	NDP	PC	16,471	11,217	12,799	–	–	–	–	–	–	40,487
ON	Lakeshore	Lib	14,464	43.02%	2,097	6.24%	NDP	PC	14,464	6,794	12,367	–	–	–	–	–	–	33,625
ON	Lambton—Kent	PC	14,460	51.84%	3,366	12.07%	Lib	NDP	11,094	14,460	2,342	–	–	–	–	–	–	27,896
ON	Lanark and Renfrew	Lib	13,156	47.40%	419	1.51%	PC	NDP	13,156	12,737	1,861	–	–	–	–	–	–	27,754
ON	Leeds	PC	13,536	46.56%	4	0.01%	Lib	NDP	13,532	13,536	2,005	–	–	–	–	–	–	29,073
ON	Lincoln	Lib	13,328	40.66%	636	1.94%	PC	NDP	13,328	12,692	6,763	–	–	–	–	–	–	32,783
ON	London East	Lib	11,823	37.30%	1,744	5.50%	PC	NDP	11,823	10,079	9,703	–	–	–	–	–	89	31,694
ON	London West	Lib	21,764	49.33%	3,302	7.48%	PC	NDP	21,764	18,462	3,891	–	–	–	–	–	–	44,117
ON	Middlesex	Lib	15,986	45.66%	702	2.00%	PC	NDP	15,986	15,284	3,743	–	–	–	–	–	–	35,013
ON	Niagara Falls	Lib	17,183	50.73%	6,358	18.77%	PC	NDP	17,183	10,825	5,861	–	–	–	–	–	–	33,869
ON	Nickel Belt	Lib	11,551	45.10%	1,930	7.54%	NDP	PC	11,551	4,439	9,621	–	–	–	–	–	–	25,611
ON	Nipissing	Lib	13,524	53.66%	5,112	20.28%	PC	NDP	13,524	8,412	3,267	–	–	–	–	–	–	25,203
ON	Norfolk—Haldimand	PC	14,908	47.36%	1,776	5.64%	Lib	NDP	13,132	14,908	3,441	–	–	–	–	–	–	31,481
ON	Northumberland—Durham	Lib	13,707	44.58%	2,566	8.35%	PC	NDP	13,707	11,141	5,897	–	–	–	–	–	–	30,745
ON	Ontario	Lib	13,483	42.57%	2,904	9.17%	PC	NDP	13,483	10,579	7,607	–	–	–	–	–	–	31,669
ON	Oshawa—Whitby	NDP	15,224	33.58%	15	0.03%	PC	Lib	14,899	15,209	15,224	–	–	–	–	–	–	45,332
ON	Ottawa Centre	Lib	19,578	57.74%	7,976	23.52%	PC	NDP	19,578	11,602	2,729	–	–	–	–	–	–	33,909
ON	Ottawa East	Lib	26,170	78.64%	21,984	66.06%	PC	NDP	26,170	4,186	2,921	–	–	–	–	–	–	33,277
ON	Ottawa West	Lib	23,750	52.61%	7,358	16.30%	PC	NDP	23,750	16,392	5,003	–	–	–	–	–	–	45,145
ON	Ottawa—Carleton	Lib	28,987	66.23%	17,322	39.58%	PC	NDP	28,987	11,665	3,115	–	–	–	–	–	–	43,767
ON	Oxford	PC	18,504	53.58%	5,807	16.81%	Lib	NDP	12,697	18,504	3,335	–	–	–	–	–	–	34,536
ON	Parkdale	Lib	14,717	51.18%	5,734	19.94%	NDP	PC	14,717	5,057	8,983	–	–	–	–	–	–	28,757
ON	Parry Sound—Muskoka	PC	12,045	47.73%	2,423	9.60%	Lib	NDP	9,622	12,045	3,568	–	–	–	–	–	–	25,235
ON	Peel South	Lib	24,255	46.81%	5,190	10.02%	PC	NDP	24,255	19,065	8,498	–	–	–	–	–	–	51,818
ON	Peel—Dufferin—Simcoe	Lib	18,950	47.30%	4,812	12.01%	PC	NDP	18,950	14,138	6,972	–	–	–	–	–	–	40,060
ON	Perth	PC	14,959	48.52%	2,095	6.79%	Lib	NDP	12,864	14,959	3,009	–	–	–	–	–	–	30,832
ON	Peterborough	Lib	15,675	42.09%	2,703	7.26%	PC	NDP	15,675	12,972	8,593	–	–	–	–	–	–	37,240
ON	Port Arthur	Lib	11,079	48.60%	3,773	16.55%	NDP	PC	11,079	4,179	7,306	–	–	–	–	–	233	22,797
ON	Prince Edward—Hastings	PC	15,682	50.81%	3,068	9.94%	Lib	NDP	12,614	15,682	2,569	–	–	–	–	–	–	30,865
ON	Renfrew North	Lib	13,195	57.41%	5,219	22.71%	PC	NDP	13,195	7,976	1,813	–	–	–	–	–	–	22,984
ON	Rosedale	Lib	19,011	57.42%	9,328	28.17%	PC	NDP	19,011	9,683	4,083	–	–	–	–	–	331	33,108
ON	Sarnia	Lib	14,573	45.27%	1,690	5.25%	PC	NDP	14,573	12,883	4,733	–	–	–	–	–	–	32,189
ON	Sault Ste. Marie	Lib	12,527	39.83%	998	3.17%	PC	NDP	12,527	11,529	7,297	–	–	–	–	102	–	31,455
ON	Scarborough East	Lib	23,701	47.94%	10,436	21.11%	NDP	PC	23,701	12,477	13,265	–	–	–	–	–	–	49,443
ON	Scarborough West	Lib	14,889	42.91%	2,416	6.96%	NDP	PC	14,889	7,340	12,473	–	–	–	–	–	–	34,702
ON	Simcoe North	PC	16,619	45.80%	1,683	4.64%	Lib	NDP	14,936	16,619	4,730	–	–	–	–	–	–	36,285
ON	Spadina	Lib	9,379	56.25%	5,436	32.60%	NDP	PC	9,379	3,353	3,943	–	–	–	–	–	–	16,675
ON	St. Catharines	Lib	18,100	45.44%	3,556	8.93%	PC	NDP	18,100	14,544	7,185	–	–	–	–	–	–	39,829
ON	St. Paul's	Lib	20,981	59.41%	10,099	28.59%	PC	NDP	20,981	10,882	2,743	–	–	420	–	–	292	35,318
ON	Stormont—Dundas	Ind	17,014	75.88%	11,605	51.75%	NDP	N/A	–	–	5,409	–	–	–	–	17,014	–	22,423
ON	Sudbury	Lib	19,672	52.28%	7,412	19.70%	NDP	PC	19,672	5,696	12,260	–	–	–	–	–	–	37,628
ON	Thunder Bay	Lib	9,540	46.48%	3,459	16.85%	NDP	PC	9,540	4,904	6,081	–	–	–	–	–	–	20,525
ON	Timiskaming	NDP	8,482	40.50%	754	3.60%	Lib	PC	7,728	4,443	8,482	–	288	–	–	–	–	20,941
ON	Timmins	Lib	11,141	50.49%	2,334	10.58%	NDP	PC	11,141	2,118	8,807	–	–	–	–	–	–	22,066
ON	Trinity	Lib	13,126	57.92%	7,766	34.27%	PC	NDP	13,126	5,360	4,177	–	–	–	–	–	–	22,663
ON	Victoria—Haliburton	PC	12,621	47.60%	2,358	8.89%	Lib	NDP	10,263	12,621	3,374	–	–	–	–	258	–	26,516
ON	Waterloo	NDP	15,231	34.00%	396	0.88%	Lib	PC	14,835	14,568	15,231	–	167	–	–	–	–	44,801
ON	Welland	Lib	17,335	49.77%	5,972	17.15%	NDP	PC	17,335	6,129	11,363	–	–	–	–	–	–	34,827
ON	Wellington	PC	13,496	44.47%	1,654	5.45%	Lib	NDP	11,842	13,496	5,012	–	–	–	–	–	–	30,350
ON	Wellington—Grey	PC	12,118	44.44%	91	0.33%	Lib	NDP	12,027	12,118	2,902	–	–	–	–	224	–	27,271
ON	Windsor West	Lib	16,442	54.06%	7,470	24.56%	NDP	PC	16,442	5,002	8,972	–	–	–	–	–	–	30,416
ON	Windsor—Walkerville	Lib	17,090	49.14%	5,000	14.38%	NDP	PC	17,090	5,191	12,090	–	–	–	–	–	408	34,779
ON	York Centre	Lib	26,758	56.60%	12,044	25.48%	NDP	PC	26,758	5,804	14,714	–	–	–	–	–	–	47,276
ON	York East	Lib	19,320	44.52%	7,165	16.51%	PC	NDP	19,320	12,155	11,921	–	–	–	–	–	–	43,396
ON	York North	Lib	24,054	51.46%	8,361	17.89%	PC	NDP	24,054	15,693	7,000	–	–	–	–	–	–	46,747
ON	York South	NDP	12,357	43.28%	664	2.33%	Lib	PC	11,693	4,499	12,357	–	–	–	–	–	–	28,549
ON	York West	Lib	20,416	44.81%	4,212	9.24%	NDP	PC	20,416 (Note: Philip Givens was previously Mayor of Toronto.)	8,344	16,204	–	–	–	–	442	155	45,561
ON	York—Scarborough	Lib	37,374	58.80%	21,916	34.48%	PC	NDP	37,374	15,458	10,724	–	–	–	–	–	–	63,556
ON	York—Simcoe	Lib	15,906	45.31%	2,806	7.99%	PC	NDP	15,906	13,100 (Note: Wallace McCutcheon was previously a Senator and Cabinet minister in the Diefenbaker government.)	6,095	–	–	–	–	–	–	35,101
PE	Cardigan	PC	5,717	49.53%	94	0.81%	Lib	NDP	5,623	5,717	203	–	–	–	–	–	–	11,543
PE	Egmont	PC	7,182	53.52%	1,237	9.22%	Lib	NDP	5,945	7,182	292	–	–	–	–	–	–	13,419
PE	Hillsborough	PC	8,328	53.03%	1,881	11.98%	Lib	NDP	6,447	8,328	930	–	–	–	–	–	–	15,705
PE	Malpeque	PC	5,049	50.00%	210	2.08%	Lib	NDP	4,839	5,049	211	–	–	–	–	–	–	10,099
QC	Abitibi	RC	10,884	54.97%	4,278	21.60%	Lib	PC	6,606	1,796	515	10,884	–	–	–	–	–	19,801
QC	Ahuntsic	Lib	23,149	64.92%	18,172	50.96%	NDP	PC	23,149	4,807	4,977	1,243	–	1,483	–	–	–	35,659
QC	Argenteuil	Lib	15,726	48.92%	2,160	6.72%	PC	NDP	15,726	13,566	1,696	1,158	–	–	–	–	–	32,146
QC	Beauce	RC	13,428	47.47%	5,676	20.07%	Lib	PC	7,752	6,207	639	13,428	–	–	–	260	–	28,286
QC	Beauharnois	Lib	17,203	59.82%	8,500	29.56%	PC	NDP	17,203	8,703	1,764	1,087	–	–	–	–	–	28,757
QC	Bellechasse	RC	11,137	46.95%	1,344	5.67%	Lib	PC	9,793	2,262	528	11,137	–	–	–	–	–	23,720
QC	Berthier	Lib	10,818	46.99%	2,636	11.45%	PC	RC	10,818	8,182	1,029	2,994	–	–	–	–	–	23,023
QC	Bonaventure	Lib	10,144	53.33%	5,904	31.04%	RC	PC	10,144	3,674	282	4,240	–	–	–	680	–	19,020
QC	Bourassa	Lib	19,778	55.09%	8,839	24.62%	PC	NDP	19,778	10,939	3,443	1,401	–	–	–	–	339	35,900
QC	Chambly	Lib	22,767	66.32%	16,028	46.69%	PC	NDP	22,767	6,739	3,394	1,430	–	–	–	–	–	34,330
QC	Champlain	RC	9,866	37.19%	201	0.76%	Lib	PC	9,665	6,449	550	9,866	–	–	–	–	–	26,530
QC	Charlevoix	PC	9,487	41.85%	1,205	5.32%	Lib	RC	8,282	9,487	1,070	3,831	–	–	–	–	–	22,670
QC	Chicoutimi	Lib	14,054	50.38%	4,243	15.21%	PC	RC	14,054	9,811	879	3,151	–	–	–	–	–	27,895
QC	Compton	RC	11,961	47.06%	3,346	13.17%	Lib	PC	8,615	3,987	851	11,961	–	–	–	–	–	25,414
QC	Dollard	Lib	34,146	72.18%	23,661	50.01%	NDP	PC	34,146	2,391	10,485	287	–	–	–	–	–	47,309
QC	Drummond	Lib	11,667	38.53%	2,122	7.01%	RC	PC	11,667	8,342	723	9,545	–	–	–	–	–	30,277
QC	Duvernay	Lib	18,701	50.54%	2,476	6.69%	NDP	PC	18,701	1,068	16,225	1,006	–	–	–	–	–	37,000
QC	Frontenac	RC	12,298	45.71%	2,435	9.05%	Lib	PC	9,863	3,510	1,231	12,298	–	–	–	–	–	26,902
QC	Gamelin	Lib	19,051	54.87%	10,185	29.33%	PC	NDP	19,051	8,866	5,210	873	–	–	–	358	365	34,723
QC	Gaspé	Lib	9,208	45.33%	2,239	11.02%	PC	RC	9,208	6,969	564	3,571	–	–	–	–	–	20,312
QC	Gatineau	Lib	14,348	53.53%	6,767	25.25%	PC	RC	14,348	7,581	1,163	3,711	–	–	–	–	–	26,803
QC	Hochelaga	Lib	12,080	55.14%	6,360	29.03%	PC	NDP	12,080	5,720	2,793	1,122	–	–	–	–	192	21,907
QC	Hull	Lib	22,982	68.72%	17,671	52.84%	RC	PC	22,982	3,661	1,151	5,311	–	337	–	–	–	33,442
QC	Joliette	PC	12,464	43.33%	172	0.60%	Lib	RC	12,292	12,464	1,620	2,391	–	–	–	–	–	28,767
QC	Kamouraska	RC	8,762	40.29%	1,131	5.20%	Lib	PC	7,631	4,996	359	8,762	–	–	–	–	–	21,748
QC	Labelle	Lib	15,801	52.90%	5,649	18.91%	PC	RC	15,801	10,152	1,699	2,215	–	–	–	–	–	29,867
QC	Lac-Saint-Jean	Lib	9,325	46.35%	895	4.45%	RC	NDP	9,325	1,034	1,330	8,430	–	–	–	–	–	20,119
QC	Lachine	Lib	25,989	64.44%	18,091	44.86%	NDP	PC	25,989	6,225	7,898	220	–	–	–	–	–	40,332
QC	Lafontaine	Lib	14,786	58.15%	8,374	32.93%	PC	NDP	14,786	6,412	3,142	879	–	210	–	–	–	25,429
QC	Langelier	Lib	11,439	39.01%	2,669	9.10%	RC	PC	11,439	8,150	658	9,078	–	–	–	–	–	29,325
QC	Lapointe	Lib	11,821	47.02%	3,744	14.89%	PC	RC	11,821	8,077	919	4,324	–	–	–	–	–	25,141
QC	Laprairie	Lib	31,968	75.89%	26,652	63.27%	PC	NDP	31,968	5,316	3,551	1,288	–	–	–	–	–	42,123
QC	Lasalle	Lib	26,546	68.70%	19,528	50.53%	PC	NDP	26,546	7,018	4,097	982	–	–	–	–	–	38,643
QC	Laurier	Lib	10,040	52.06%	5,638	29.23%	Ind	PC	10,040	2,827	843	695	–	–	–	4,882	–	19,287
QC	Laval	Lib	24,740	64.38%	18,933	49.27%	NDP	PC	24,740	4,801	5,807	940	–	–	–	–	2,141	38,429
QC	Lévis	Lib	12,227	37.25%	2,340	7.13%	RC	PC	12,227	9,523	1,189	9,887	–	–	–	–	–	32,826
QC	Longueuil	Lib	19,080	60.69%	13,632	43.36%	PC	NDP	19,080	5,448	4,254	2,023	–	–	281	–	354 (Note: Robert Charlebois stood as a Rhinoceros candidate.)	31,440
QC	Lotbiniere	RC	11,302	37.68%	1,559	5.20%	Lib	PC	9,743	8,215	732	11,302	–	–	–	–	–	29,992
QC	Louis-Hébert	Lib	28,220	64.31%	20,046	45.68%	PC	RC	28,220	8,174	2,054	5,433	–	–	–	–	–	43,881
QC	Maisonneuve	Lib	15,784	58.19%	10,262	37.83%	PC	NDP	15,784	5,522	4,588	1,233	–	–	–	–	–	27,127
QC	Manicouagan	Lib	13,504	60.02%	8,965	39.85%	PC	NDP	13,504	4,539	2,463	1,992	–	–	–	–	–	22,498
QC	Matane	Lib	9,207	53.97%	3,152	18.48%	PC	RC	9,207	6,055	639	1,159	–	–	–	–	–	17,060
QC	Mercier	Lib	19,077	52.14%	8,506	23.25%	PC	NDP	19,077	10,571	3,041	3,011	–	–	–	888	–	36,588
QC	Missisquoi	Lib	12,905	42.15%	1,200	3.92%	PC	RC	12,905	11,705	803	5,205	–	–	–	–	–	30,618
QC	Montmorency	Lib	17,327	41.83%	1,213	2.93%	RC	PC	17,327	6,555	775	16,114	–	–	–	649	–	41,420
QC	Mount Royal	Lib	37,402	90.76%	35,437	85.99%	PC	NDP	37,402	1,965	1,583	80	–	–	–	182	–	41,212
QC	Notre-Dame-de-Grâce	Lib	25,959	73.03%	18,836	52.99%	NDP	PC	25,959	2,466	7,123	–	–	–	–	–	–	35,548
QC	Outremont	Lib	24,219	78.66%	20,708	67.26%	NDP	PC	24,219	3,059	3,511	–	–	–	–	–	–	30,789
QC	Papineau	Lib	14,379	63.20%	10,211	44.88%	PC	NDP	14,379	4,168	2,572	1,094	–	–	–	–	537	22,750
QC	Pontiac	Lib	10,250	49.07%	2,858	13.68%	PC	RC	10,250	7,392	827	2,420	–	–	–	–	–	20,889
QC	Portneuf	RC	18,328	48.31%	4,363	11.50%	Lib	PC	13,965	4,519	1,126	18,328	–	–	–	–	–	37,938
QC	Québec-Est	Lib	14,945	43.56%	1,138	3.32%	RC	PC	14,945	4,607	953	13,807	–	–	–	–	–	34,312
QC	Richelieu	Lib	15,350	48.76%	2,880	9.15%	PC	RC	15,350	12,470	1,300	1,966	–	–	–	395	–	31,481
QC	Richmond	RC	11,853	47.68%	2,983	12.00%	Lib	PC	8,870	3,527	608	11,853	–	–	–	–	–	24,858
QC	Rimouski	Lib	12,073	49.37%	2,628	10.75%	PC	RC	12,073	9,445	–	2,937	–	–	–	–	–	24,455
QC	Roberval	RC	8,811	47.04%	1,084	5.79%	Lib	PC	7,727	1,951	241	8,811	–	–	–	–	–	18,730
QC	Saint-Denis	Lib	17,022	71.68%	13,369	56.30%	PC	NDP	17,022	3,653	1,908	1,165	–	–	–	–	–	23,748
QC	Saint-Henri	Lib	12,792	63.45%	9,293	46.09%	Ind	NDP	12,792	972	1,491	608	–	465	–	3,834 (Note: Pierre Sévigny was previously a PC MP and Cabinet minister under John Diefenbaker. He received 3,499 votes.)	–	20,162
QC	Saint-Hyacinthe	PC	16,389	47.44%	788	2.28%	Lib	RC	15,601	16,389	878	1,682	–	–	–	–	–	34,550
QC	Saint-Jacques	Lib	9,701	59.74%	5,463	33.64%	PC	NDP	9,701	4,238	971	705	–	–	–	314	311	16,240
QC	Saint-Jean	Lib	15,878	52.04%	6,163	20.20%	PC	NDP	15,878	9,715	3,332	1,373	–	–	–	–	214	30,512
QC	Saint-Maurice	Lib	13,895	44.52%	1,697	5.44%	RC	PC	13,895	4,570	550	12,198	–	–	–	–	–	31,213
QC	Saint-Michel	Lib	22,307	66.80%	17,622	52.77%	PC	NDP	22,307	4,685	3,176	2,515	–	–	–	–	711	33,394
QC	Sainte-Marie	PC	9,528	45.04%	2,079	9.83%	Lib	Ind-Lib	7,449	9,528	1,149	884	–	1,977 (Note: Albert Caplette was the Liberal nominee in 1965.)	–	169	–	21,156
QC	Shefford	RC	12,633	40.64%	475	1.53%	Lib	PC	12,158	5,718	574	12,633	–	–	–	–	–	31,083
QC	Sherbrooke	Lib	15,270	40.24%	98	0.26%	RC	PC	15,270	5,946	1,563	15,172	–	–	–	–	–	37,951
QC	Témiscamingue	RC	12,532	58.38%	5,929	27.62%	Lib	PC	6,603	1,774	556	12,532	–	–	–	–	–	21,465
QC	Témiscouata	Lib	10,605	46.88%	1,975	8.73%	PC	RC	10,605	8,630	360	3,029	–	–	–	–	–	22,624
QC	Terrebonne	Lib	21,191	62.01%	14,257	41.72%	PC	NDP	21,191	6,934	3,860	1,363	–	–	–	–	824	34,172
QC	Trois-Rivières	Lib	17,592	46.23%	7,091	18.64%	PC	RC	17,592 (Note: Joseph-Alfred Mongrain was elected as an Independent MP in 1965.)	10,501	1,724	7,305	–	–	–	930	–	38,052
QC	Vaudreuil	Lib	29,830	73.86%	22,176	54.91%	PC	NDP	29,830	7,654	2,905	–	–	–	–	–	–	40,389
QC	Verdun	Lib	22,436	75.64%	19,026	64.14%	PC	NDP	22,436	3,410	2,813	1,004	–	–	–	–	–	29,663
QC	Villeneuve	RC	10,073	47.66%	2,079	9.84%	Lib	PC	7,994	2,182	886	10,073	–	–	–	–	–	21,135
QC	Westmount	Lib	31,104	79.07%	25,176	64.00%	PC	NDP	31,104	5,928	2,303	–	–	–	–	–	–	39,335
SK	Assiniboia	Lib	9,636	33.84%	95	0.33%	PC	NDP	9,636	9,541	9,295	–	–	–	–	–	–	28,472
SK	Battleford—Kindersley	NDP	10,583	37.27%	642	2.26%	PC	Lib	7,872	9,941	10,583	–	–	–	–	–	–	28,396
SK	Mackenzie	PC	8,578	42.28%	1,066	5.25%	NDP	Lib	4,199	8,578	7,512	–	–	–	–	–	–	20,289
SK	Meadow Lake	PC	7,688	39.65%	1,608	8.29%	NDP	Lib	4,932	7,688	6,080	–	–	–	–	689	–	19,389
SK	Moose Jaw	NDP	11,982	40.65%	1,486	5.04%	PC	Lib	7,000	10,496	11,982	–	–	–	–	–	–	29,478
SK	Prince Albert	PC	17,850	56.04%	8,871	27.85%	NDP	Lib	5,025	17,850	8,979	–	–	–	–	–	–	31,854
SK	Qu'Appelle—Moose Mountain	PC	12,429	42.14%	3,664	12.42%	NDP	Lib	8,299	12,429	8,765	–	–	–	–	–	–	29,493
SK	Regina East	NDP	13,641	34.70%	192	0.49%	PC	Lib	11,986	13,449	13,641	–	–	–	–	–	230	39,306
SK	Regina—Lake Centre	NDP	17,102	39.07%	3,530	8.06%	PC	Lib	13,104	13,572	17,102	–	–	–	–	–	–	43,778
SK	Saskatoon—Biggar	NDP	15,928	42.69%	2,619	7.02%	PC	Lib	8,071	13,309	15,928	–	–	–	–	–	–	37,308
SK	Saskatoon—Humboldt	Lib	15,210	34.33%	555	1.25%	NDP	PC	15,210	14,444	14,655	–	–	–	–	–	–	44,309
SK	Swift Current—Maple Creek	PC	11,237	39.60%	1,030	3.63%	NDP	Lib	6,930	11,237	10,207	–	–	–	–	–	–	28,374
SK	Yorkton—Melville	NDP	13,212	38.88%	2,513	7.40%	PC	Lib	10,068	10,699	13,212	–	–	–	–	–	–	33,979
Terr	Northwest Territories	Lib	6,018	63.80%	3,807	40.36%	PC	NDP	6,018	2,211	1,203	–	–	–	–	–	–	9,432
Terr	Yukon	PC	3,110	47.97%	62	0.96%	Lib	NDP	3,048	3,110	325	–	–	–	–	–	–	6,483

= open seat
= new riding created in the 1966 redistribution
= winning candidate was in previous House
= not incumbent; was previously elected as an MP
= incumbent had switched allegiance
= incumbency arose from byelection gain
= previously incumbent in another riding
= other incumbents renominated
= Speaker of the House of Commons
= Previously a member of one of the provincial/territorial legislatures
= multiple candidates
= previously part of a two-member district

== Vote and seat summaries ==
Ternary plots - shift of electoral support (1965-1968)
1965

1968
Electoral districts identified by colours of winning parties

Popular vote
Liberal	45.37%
PC	31.43%
NDP	16.96%
RC	4.43%
Social Credit	0.85%
Others	0.96%

Seat totals
Liberal	58.71%
PC	27.27%
NDP	8.33%
RC	5.30%
Independent	0.38%

== Results by province ==
Party name		BC	AB	SK	MB	ON	QC	NB	NS	PE	NL	NT	YK	Total
Liberal	Seats:	16	4	2	5	63	56	5	1	-	1	1	-	154
Liberal	Popular vote:	41.8	35.7	27.1	41.5	46.2	53.6	44.4	38.0	45.0	42.8	63.8	47.0	45.4
Progressive Conservative	Seats:	-	15	5	5	17	4	5	10	4	6	-	1	72
Progressive Conservative	Vote:	18.9	51.0	37.0	31.4	32.0	21.4	49.7	55.2	51.8	52.7	23.4	48.0	31.4
New Democratic	Seats:	7	-	6	3	6	-	-	-	-	-	-	-	22
New Democratic	Vote:	32.6	9.4	35.7	25.0	20.6	7.5	4.9	6.7	3.2	4.4	12.8	5.0	17.0
Ralliement créditiste	Seats:						14	-						14
Ralliement créditiste	Vote:						16.4	0.7						4.4
Independent	Seats:	-	-	-	-	1	-	-						1
Independent	Vote:	0.1	0.2	0.2	0.3	0.6	0.6	0.2						0.4
Liberal-Labour	Seats:					1								1
Liberal-Labour	Vote:					0.3								0.1
Total seats:		23	19	13	13	88	74	10	11	4	7	1	1	264
Parties that won no seats:
Social Credit	Vote:	6.4	1.9		1.5	xx					0.1			0.8
Independent Liberal	Vote:		1.5			0.1	0.2							0.2
Communist	Vote:	0.1	0.1	0.1	0.2	0.1	xx							0.1
Independent PC	Vote:		0.2			xx	xx	0.1	0.1					xx
Démocratisation Écon.	Vote:						0.1							xx
Franc Lib	Vote:						0.1							xx
Independent Cons.	Vote:				0.2									xx
Reform	Vote:	0.1												xx
Rhinoceros	Vote:						xx							xx
Conservative	Vote:						xx							xx
Espirit social	Vote:						xx							xx
Socialist Labour	Vote:					xx								xx
Republican	Vote:	xx												xx
New Canada	Vote:					xx								xx
National Socialist	Vote:					xx								xx

=== Notes ===
xx - less than 0.05% of the popular vote.

- Voter turnout: 75.7% of the eligible population voted.

== See also ==
- List of Canadian federal general elections
- List of political parties in Canada
- 28th Canadian Parliament
