= Louis Even =

Canadian politician (1885–1974)

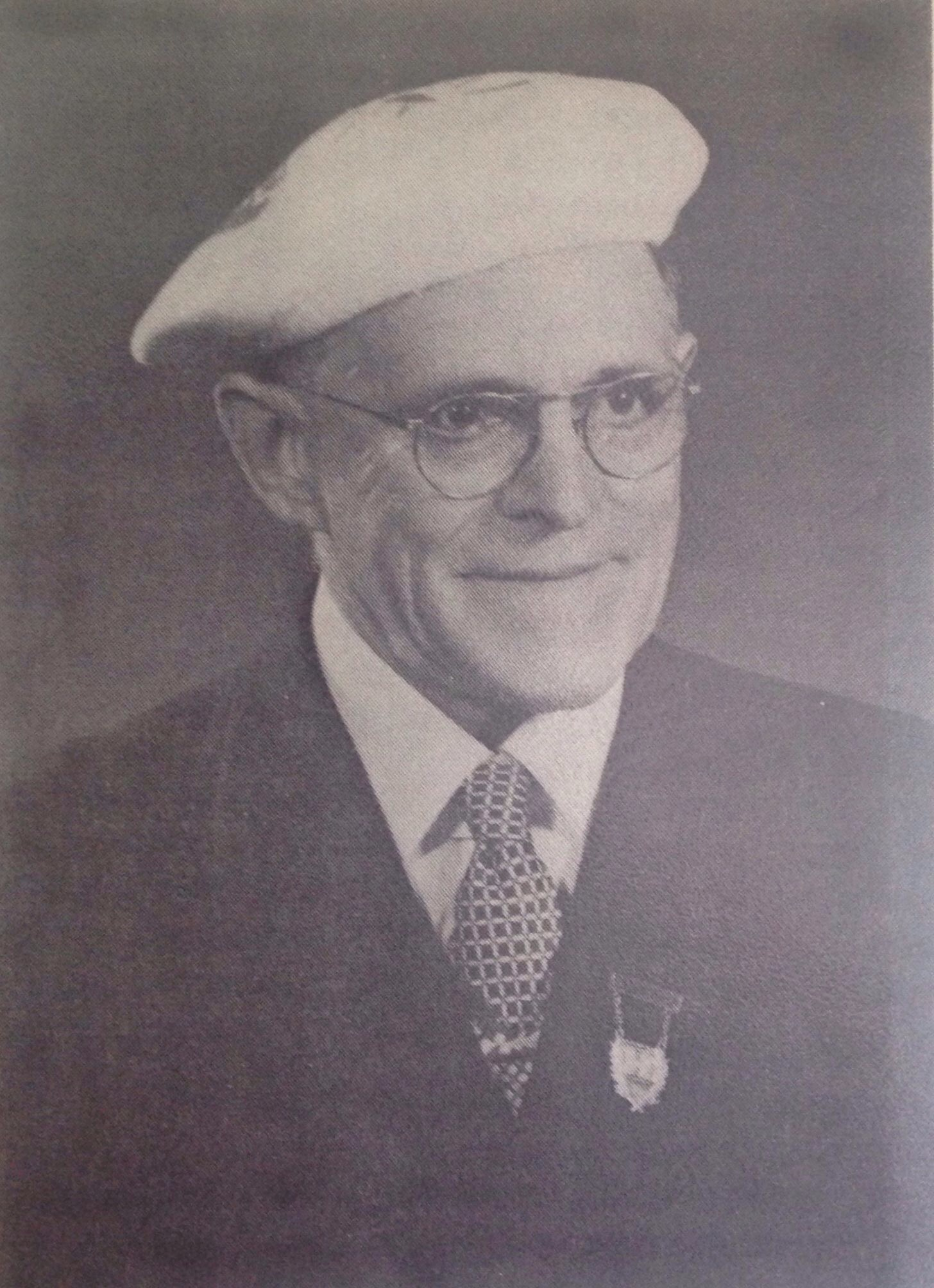
Louis Even

Louis Even (March 23, 1885, Montfort-sur-Meu – September 27, 1974) was a lay Christian leader and publisher who founded the social credit movement in Quebec. He co-founded and led the Pilgrims of Saint Michael, better known as the white berets, with Gilberte Côté-Mercier and was a founder of the Union of Electors, a predecessor of Réal Caouette's Ralliement créditiste.

In 1940, he ran for a seat in the House of Commons of Canada as a New Democracy candidate in Lake St-John—Roberval and came in third with over 3,000 votes.

== See also ==
- Canadian social credit movement
