= Ralliement créditiste =

Canadian political party

There were several political parties that were part of the Canadian social credit movement in Quebec. There were various parties at different times with different names at the provincial level, all broadly following the social credit philosophy; these parties had varying degrees of affiliation with the Social Credit Party of Canada at the federal level.

The greatest success achieved by a provincial social credit party in Quebec was the Ralliement créditiste du Québec, which won 12 seats in the 1970 Quebec provincial election.

== Union des électeurs ==
The Union des électeurs (UE) (in English: "Union of Electors") was founded in 1939 by Louis Even and Gilberte Côté-Mercier. It was the first créditiste political movement to be active in Quebec. It ran two candidates, Even and Armand Turpin, in the 1940 federal election as part of the Canada-wide New Democracy movement. Even won 17% of the vote and placed third in the riding of Lake St-John—Roberval. Turpin placed second with over 31.8% of the vote in Hull. Even and the Union attended the founding convention of the Social Credit Association of Canada in 1944 and opposed the bid of the western Canada-based Social Credit federal caucus to establish a central party under the leadership of Solon Low. While Even's group ran candidates in the 1945 federal election under the national Social Credit banner and again in subsequent by-elections, by 1949 the Quebec créditistes were again running candidates under the Union des électeurs banner as they were also doing in the Quebec provincial elections.

The Union was accused of antisemitism and of distributing the Protocols of the Elders of Zion in Quebec. The Canadian Jewish Congress referred to it as "fast becoming the rallying point of the numerous Jew-haters in French Canada".

The Union des électeurs' electoral philosophy was that it was not a partisan political party but an organization which marshals voters to enforce their wishes on their elected representatives. Even's belief, like that of social credit originator C.H. Douglas, was that parties were corrupt and that the party system should be replaced by a "union of electors" who would compel elected officials to follow the popular will. Even and the Union broke with the national Social Credit organization in 1947 due to Ernest Manning's increasingly hostile attitude towards them and his purge of anti-Semites from the movement. The Union influenced some Social Crediters outside of Quebec, including the Social Credit Association of Ontario which stood its candidates in the 1948 Ontario elections under the name "Union of Electors". In British Columbia, there was a "Union of Electors" party which ran as a rival to the British Columbia Social Credit League in the 1949 provincial election.

With Réal Caouette and then P. Ernest Grégoire as leader, the Quebec provincial party contested seats in the 1944 provincial election but won no seats and the 1948 provincial election when it managed to get 9.25% of the popular vote, but again won no seats. It also ran candidates federally: Caouette was elected to the House of Commons of Canada in a 1946 by-election under the Social Credit banner. He failed to win re-election in the 1949 federal election as a Union des électeurs candidate, when the party ran a total of 56 candidates. None were successful.

The Union des électeurs faded away as a political party after 1949. In the 1950s, Caouette contested seats in various by-elections against the wishes of Even and Côté-Mercier. In 1958, Caouette broke with Even and Côté-Mercier. Caouette founded the Ralliement des créditistes, which ran candidates in federal elections in the 1950s and 1960s; at times, the party was also the Quebec branch of the Social Credit Party of Canada. In 1970, the federal Ralliement des créditistes founded a distinct provincial branch, the Ralliement créditiste du Québec.

In 1939, Even and Côté also founded a lay Catholic group called the "Pilgrims of Saint Michael". Based in Rougemont, Quebec, the group continued to promote social credit monetary policy coupled with conservative Catholicism. The Pilgrims publish The Michael Journal in English and Vers Demain in French. The group was founded in 1939; it was nicknamed "the White Berets" for the headgear worn by members.

=== Federal general election results ===
Election	# of candidates nominated	# of seats won	# of total votes	% of popular vote
1945	1	0	596	0.01%
1949	56	0	86,087	1.47%

=== Quebec provincial general election results ===
General election	# of candidates	# of seats won	% of popular vote
1944	11	0	1.44%
1948	91	0	9.24%

== Candidats des électeurs ==
Réal Caouette ran under this label in the 1957 and 1958 federal elections. They failed to win a seat in both elections.

== Candidats libéral des électeurs ==
In the 1962 and 1963 federal elections, a small breakaway from Social Credit ran a single candidate under the name Candidat libéral des électeurs without success. The 1962 candidate, J.-Edouard Pharon, received 1,800 votes. This was 500 more than the Social Credit candidate.

== Ralliement des créditistes du Canada ==
Réal Caouette had been a social credit stalwart since the joining the movement in 1939, running as a candidate for the Union des électeurs. He won a seat in the House of Commons in a by-election, but lost it in the next general election. He was a true believer in social credit theory and a charismatic, almost evangelical speaker.

In 1958, he broke with Union des électeurs founders Louis Even and Gilberte Côté-Mercier, and formed the Ralliement des créditistes du Canada as the Quebec wing of the Social Credit Party of Canada on May 4, 1958. Caouette was named leader of the new organization. His party political broadcasts on Quebec television developed a great following. Caouette ran for the leadership of the Social Credit Party of Canada in 1961, but was defeated by Robert N. Thompson.

Driven by Caouette's fiery oratory, the Social Credit Party achieved a breakthrough in the 1962 federal election, winning 26 seats in Quebec. Only four Social Credit MPs were elected in the rest of Canada.

Thompson insisted on remaining national party leader after 1962, even though the Social Credit caucus was overwhelmingly from Quebec and regarded Caouette as its leader. Thompson accepted Caouette as his deputy leader.

This tension led to a split: in 1963, the Quebec wing became independent from the party in the rest of country as the Ralliement des créditistes, or Social Credit Rally in English. Of the 20 Social Credit MPs elected in Quebec in the 1963 federal election, 13 followed Caouette into the Ralliement, five ran in the next election as independents and two joined the Progressive Conservative Party of Canada.

The Ralliement ran as a separate party in the 1965 federal election. Nine of its candidates were elected in Quebec in 1965. It went on to win 14 seats in Quebec in 1968, and then creditiste leader Caouette became leader of the Social Credit Party. The party took seats in Quebec in the 1970s.

In 1968, Thompson joined the Progressive Conservative Party.

=== General election results – Ralliement des créditistes ===
Election	# of candidates nominated	# of seats won	# of total votes	% of popular vote
1965	77	9	359,258	4.66%

== Ralliement créditiste ==
In October 1967, the Ralliement des créditistes changed its name to Ralliement créditiste.

In the 1968 federal election, the Social Credit Party won no seats in the House of Commons, while Caouette's Ralliement créditiste returned 14 MPs.

In 1969, the federal Ralliement créditiste entered provincial politics by running candidates in four Quebec by-elections. The candidates appeared on the ballot without party designation, as the party did not run candidates in the last general election. All were defeated. A dissident group opposed to Caouette's leadership founded the Parti crédit social uni in this period.

The Ralliement créditiste du Québec was created in January 1970 and fielded candidates in the 1970 and 1973 provincial elections.

In 1971, Caouette and the Ralliement créditiste rejoined the Social Credit Party of Canada, and Caouette was elected national leader.

The Social Credit Party under Caouette's leadership won 15 seats in 1972 and 11 in 1974. Under Fabien Roy’s leadership it won 6 in 1979. It won no seats in 1980.

=== General election results - Ralliement créditiste ===
Election	# of candidates nominated	# of seats won	# of total votes	% of popular vote
1968	72	14	360,404	4.43%

== See also ==
- List of political parties in Canada
- List of Social Credit/Creditistes MPs
- Politics of Quebec
- List of Quebec general elections
- Timeline of Quebec history
