= Results of the 1940 Canadian federal election =

1940 Canadian federal election

== Results by Province and Territory ==
=== Alberta ===
Results in Alberta
Party	Seats	Second	Third	Fourth	Fifth	Votes	%	+/-
Liberals	7	10				102,060	37.89	
New Democracy	3	4	2			48,591	18.04	
Social Credit	7	1				44,432	16.5	
National Government		2	5	3		35,116	13.04	
CCF			8	7		35,082	13.03	
United Progressive			1			2,727	1.01	
Communist					1	847	0.31	
Independent				1		488	0.18	
Total	17					269,343	100.0	

=== British Columbia ===
Results in British Columbia
Party	Seats	Second	Third	Fourth	Fifth	Votes	%	+/-
Liberals	10	2	3			135,920	37.43	
National Government	4	5	5			104,644	28.82	
CCF	1	9	6			103,181	28.41	
Independent	1			1	1	10,967	3.02	
New Democracy			1	1		6,481	1.78	
Communist				1		1,398	0.38	
Independent Nationalist					1	408	0.11	
Independent Liberal				1		145	0.04	
Total	16					363,144	100.0	

=== Manitoba ===
Results in Manitoba
Party	Seats	Second	Third	Fourth	Fifth	Sixth	Votes	%	+/-
Liberals	13	2					136,725	43.15	
National Government	1	10	4	2			82,240	25.95	
CCF	1	3	7	1		1	61,448	19.39	
Liberal-Progressive	2						14,755	4.66	
Independent		2	1		1		10,569	3.34	
Communist			1				5,315	1.68	
New Democracy			1	1	1		3,992	1.26	
Social Credit			1				1,839	0.58	
Total	17						316,883	100.0	

=== New Brunswick ===
Results in New Brunswick
Party	Seats	Second	Third	Votes	%	+/-
Liberals	5	5		94,383	54.62	
National Government	5	5		74,970	43.39	
Independent Liberal			1	2,679	1.55	
CCF			1	761	0.44	
Total	10			172,793	100.0	

=== Nova Scotia ===
Results in Nova Scotia
Party	Seats	Second	Third	Fourth	Fifth	Votes	%	+/-
Liberals	10	2				142,514	50.42	
National Government	1	9	2			113,206	40.05	
CCF	1		3		1	17,100	6.05	
Independent Liberal				1		9,217	3.26	
Independent			1			615	0.22	
Total	12					282,652	100.0	

=== Ontario ===
Results in Ontario
Party	Seats	Second	Third	Fourth	Fifth	Votes	%	+/-
Liberals	56	25				810,000	50.33	
National Government	22	52	3			647,524	40.23	
CCF			23	1		61,166	3.8	
Conservative	3	1				35,386	2.2	
Independent Liberal		2	1			15,902	0.99	
Liberal-Progressive	1	1				13,060	0.81	
Farmer-Labour			2			8,126	0.5	
Independent		1	1			6,144	0.38	
United Farmers of Ontario-Labour			1			4,761	0.3	
Communist			1	1		3,617	0.22	
National Liberal Progressive			1			2,434	0.15	
New Democratic Party			1			786	0.05	
Canadian Labour				1		398	0.02	
Unknown					1	110	0.01	
Total	82					1,609,414	100.0	

=== Prince Edward Island ===
Results in Prince Edward Island
Party	Seats	Second	Third	Votes	%	+/-
Liberals	4			34,664	55.29	
National Government		3	1	28,028	44.71	
Total	4			62,692	100.0	

=== Quebec ===
Results in Quebec
Party	Seats	Second	Third	Fourth	Fifth	Sixth	Seventh	Eighth	Votes	%	+/-
Liberals	62	4							749,390	63.97	
National Government		41	7	2					209,391	17.87	
Independent Liberal	2	10	7	7					119,273	10.18	
Independent		4	2		1	1		1	24,689	2.11	
Conservative		3							12,496	1.07	
Independent Nationalist		1							12,302	1.05	
New Democracy		1	1						10,781	0.92	
Independent Conservative	1		2	1			1		10,431	0.89	
CCF			3	1					7,610	0.65	
Labour Farmer			1						3,916	0.33	
National Labour		1							2,354	0.2	
Communist			1						728	0.06	
Anti-Conscriptionist				1					642	0.05	
Total	65								1,171,497	100.0	

=== Saskatchewan ===
Results in Saskatchewan
Party	Seats	Second	Third	Fourth	Votes	%	+/-
Liberals	12	9			159,530	43.02	
CCF	5	8	3		106,267	28.66	
National Government	2	2	5		52,226	14.08	
United Reform Movement	1				13,868	3.74	
Unity	1		1		12,337	3.33	
New Democracy		1	3		12,106	3.26	
National Unity		1			7,534	2.03	
Independent			1		3,775	1.02	
Communist			1	2	2,109	0.57	
Conservative				1	602	0.16	
United Reform			1		269	0.07	
Social Credit-National Unity			1		241	0.06	
Total	21				370,864	100.0	

=== Yukon ===
Results in Yukon
Party	Seats	Second	Votes	%	+/-
National Government	1		915	53.57	
Liberals		1	793	46.43	
Total	1		1,708	100.0	
