= Social credit (disambiguation) =

Social credit may refer to:

- Social credit, a distributive philosophy of political economy
  - Canadian social credit movement
- Social Credit System, a Chinese national credit rating and blacklist system
- Social Credit Board (1937–1948), a committee in Alberta, Canada

== Political parties ==
- Social Credit Party (disambiguation), multiple parties
