= William Arthur Steel =

William Arthur Steel MC (November 3, 1890 – November 28, 1968) was a Canadian Army officer during World War I and a radio pioneer.

Steel was born in 1890 in Castleton, Ontario and graduated from electrical engineering from the University of Toronto in 1915

== Military career ==
After graduation he joined the Canadian Army (Permanent Active Militia) in World War I in France as a wireless officer. He was awarded an MC in the 1917 Birthday Honours. Post war he became Chief Wireless Officer with the Canadian Army Signals Corps and was in charge of the National Research Council's radio laboratory in the early 1930s.

== Later years ==
Steel retired as lieutenant colonel in 1936, and later served as a commissioner with the Canadian Radio Broadcasting Commission, which became the Canadian Broadcasting Corporation. He was involved with William Duncan Herridge in the New Democracy, a party that advocated social credit in the late 1930s and early 1940s. Steel helped create radio network in the Northwest Territories and radio for civil aviation in Canada.

Steel later worked as a consultant and involved in the DEW Line until his death.

== Death ==
He died in Ottawa, Ontario, in 1968 and was buried at Beechwood Cemetery.
