= Howard Earl Johnston =

Canadian politician (1928-2001)

Howard Earl Johnston (13 June 1928 – 5 June 2001) was a Canadian politician and teacher. Johnston served in the House of Commons of Canada.

Official 1974 portrait

Johnston was born in Enderby, British Columbia and grew up on a farm in the Okanagan Valley. He studied English and History at university and became a high school teacher.

He joined the British Columbia Social Credit Party prior to its breakthrough in the 1952 provincial election and remained involved with the party. He was approached to run for it in the 1960s. He was first elected in 1965 under the Social Credit Party of Canada in the Okanagan—Revelstoke electoral district, serving in the 27th Canadian Parliament. Following riding boundary changes, he was defeated in the 1968 federal election in the Okanagan—Kootenay riding.

He made another unsuccessful attempt to gain the riding in the 1972 federal election, this time switching to the Progressive Conservative Party. In the 1974 federal election, he won Okanagan—Kootenay and served one term as a Progressive Conservative in the 30th Canadian Parliament before retiring at the 1979 federal election.

Johnston took up painting after retiring from politics.

Parliament of Canada
Preceded by Stuart A. Fleming	Member of Parliament for Okanagan—Revelstoke; 1965-1968	Succeeded by The electoral district was abolished in 1966.
Preceded by William Douglas Stewart	Member of Parliament for Okanagan—Kootenay; 1974-1979	Succeeded by The electoral district was abolished in 1976.
