= Republican Party (Canada) =

The Parti républicain/Republican Party was a Quebec-based Canadian political party that nominated two candidates in federal by-elections in 1971. None were elected.

The party nominated two candidates in by-elections held on 31 May 1971. In Chambly riding, leader Claude Longtin won 396 votes, (1.6% of the total), and in Trois-Rivières, Joseph Thibodeau won 170 votes (0.6%).

In June 1971, the party merged with the Parti de la Démocratisation Économique. Longtin later ran as an independent in the 1972 federal election in the riding of Chambly, receiving 474 votes (0.9%).

In 2021, Rob Carbone adopted the name for his own unregistered political party during the 2019 federal election, a group previously known as the Progressive Party.

== See also ==
- Parti de la Démocratisation Économique
- List of political parties in Canada

== Sources ==
- Parliament of Canada History of the Federal Electoral Ridings since 1867
