= Pilgrims of Saint Michael =

Roman Catholic organization in Canada

- Abbreviation: White Berets
- Formation: 1939
- Type: Social Credit movement
- Headquarters: Rougemont, Quebec, Canada
- Key people: Louis Even and Gilberte Cété-Mercier
- Website: www.michaeljournal.org

The Pilgrims of St. Michael (the "white berets") is a Roman Catholic organization in Canada that promotes social credit economic theories in Canada and other countries. It was founded in 1939 by Louis Even and Gilberte Cété-Mercier. The organisation's newspaper was described in 1994 as being "sprinkled with anti-Semitic references to Jewish bankers and corrupt politicians who seek 'absolute world control.'"

== See also ==
- Ralliement créditiste
- Canadian social credit movement
- Canadian Society of Medievalists
- Catholic Civil Rights League
- Salt + Light Television
