= Opinion polling for the 1968 Canadian federal election =

This article is about polls leading up to the 1968 Canadian federal election.

== During the 27th Parliament of Canada ==
Evolution of voting intentions at national level
Polling firm	Last day of survey	Source	LPC	PC	NDP	Other	ME	Sample
Election 1968	June 25, 1968		45.37	31.43	16.96	6.24		
Gallup	June 1968		47	29	18	6	—	—
Gallup	May 25, 1968		46	29	15	10	4.0	—
Gallup	May 1968		50	29	16	5	4.0	—
Pierre Elliot Trudeau becomes leader of the LPC (April 6, 1968) and PM (April 20, 1968)
Gallup	March 1968		42	34	16	8	4.0	—
Gallup	January 1968		32	38	18	12	—	—
Lester Pearson announces his retirement as Prime Minister (14 December 1967)
Gallup	October 1967		34	43	17	6	4.0	—
Robert Stanfield becomes leader of the PC Party (September 9, 1967)
Gallup	August 1967		41	30	18	11	4.0	—
Gallup	May 1967		36	29	26	9	—	—
Gallup	February 1967		37	25	28	10	—	—
Gallup	November 1966		38	26	26	10	—	—
Gallup	September 1966		37	32	21	10	—	—
Gallup	July 1966		38	30	20	12	—	—
Gallup	April 1966		41	30	19	10	—	—
Gallup	January 1966		44	28	21	7	—	—
Election 1965	November 8, 1965		40.18	32.41	17.91	9.50		

== Riding-specific polls ==
=== Fort William ===
Evolution of voting intentions at national level
Polling firm	Last day of survey	Source	LPC	NDP	PC	ME	Sample
Election 1968	June 25, 1968		40.59	28.22	27.80		
Lakehead University	June 19, 1968		46.2	25.7	28.2	—	600
Election 1965	November 8, 1965		47.45	34.33	18.22		
