= George McLeod (British Columbia politician) =

Canadian politician

Member of Parliament for Okanagan—Revelstoke
- In office August 1953 – March 1958
- Preceded by: riding created
- Succeeded by: Stuart Fleming

Member of Parliament for North Okanagan
- In office September 1963 – December 1965
- Preceded by: Lorne Shantz
- Succeeded by: Patricia Jordan

Personal details
- Born: George William McLeod; 30 May 1896 Harriston, Ontario, Canada
- Died: 20 December 1965 (aged 69) Enderby, British Columbia, Canada
- Party: Social Credit
- Profession: garage owner and operator

George William McLeod (30 May 1896 – 20 December 1965) was a Social Credit party member of the House of Commons of Canada and the Legislative Assembly of British Columbia. He was born in Harriston, Ontario and became a garage owner and operator by career.

He was first elected at the Okanagan—Revelstoke riding in the 1953 general election and re-elected there in 1957. He was defeated after his second term by Stuart Fleming of the Progressive Conservative party in the 1958 election. He was then elected to the provincial assembly in 1963 for the riding of North Okanagan but died in office of a stroke in Enderby, British Columbia in 1965 at the age of 69.
