= William Douglas Stewart =

Canadian politician and lawyer (1938–2018)

Member of Parliament for Okanagan—Kootenay
- In office June 1968 – May 1974

Personal details
- Born: 26 March 1938 Victoria, British Columbia, Canada
- Died: 2 March 2018 (aged 79)
- Party: Liberal
- Profession: lawyer

William Douglas Stewart (26 March 1938 – 2 March 2018) was a Liberal party member of the House of Commons of Canada. He was a lawyer by career.

Born at Victoria, British Columbia, Stewart was first elected at the Okanagan—Kootenay riding in the 1968 general election. Stewart was re-elected there in the 1972 election, but did not seek a third term in federal office after completing his term in the 29th Canadian Parliament. He died from cancer in 2018 at the age of 79.
