= Okanagan—Kootenay =

Former federal electoral district in British Columbia, Canada

British Columbia electoral district

Defunct federal electoral district
- Legislature: House of Commons
- District created: 1966
- District abolished: 1976
- First contested: 1968
- Last contested: 1974

Okanagan—Kootenay was a federal electoral district in British Columbia, Canada, that was represented in the House of Commons of Canada from 1968 to 1979. This riding was created in 1966 from parts of Kamloops, Kootenay East and Okanagan—Revelstoke ridings.

It was abolished in 1976 when it was redistributed into Kamloops—Shuswap, Kootenay East, and Okanagan North ridings.

== Members of Parliament ==
Parliament	Years	Member	Party
Riding created from Kamloops, Kootenay East and Okanagan—Revelstoke
28th	1968–1972	William Douglas Stewart	Liberal
29th	1972–1974	William Douglas Stewart	Liberal
30th	1974–1979	Howard Earl Johnston	Progressive Conservative
Riding dissolved into Kamloops—Shuswap, Kootenay East and Okanagan North

== Election results ==
1974 Canadian federal election
Party	Candidate	Votes	%	±%
Progressive Conservative	Howard Earl Johnston	17,164	39.79	+7.47
Liberal	Hari Singh	15,051	34.89	+2.16
New Democratic	Peter Maksylewich	8,163	18.92	–11.13
Social Credit	Helmut Fandrich	2,438	5.65	+0.76
Independent	Norm Baker	318	0.74	–
Total valid votes		43,134	99.69	
Total rejected ballots		135	0.31	–2.06
Turnout		43,269	69.90	–0.41
Eligible voters		61,905		
Progressive Conservative gain from Liberal		Swing		+2.66
Source: Library of Parliament

1972 Canadian federal election
Party	Candidate	Votes	%	±%
Liberal	William Douglas Stewart	12,416	32.73	–3.25
Progressive Conservative	Howard Earl Johnston	12,258	32.32	+13.84
New Democratic	Peter Maksylewich	11,400	30.06	–0.18
Social Credit	Agner Dahl Jensen	1,855	4.89	–28.89
Total valid votes		37,929	97.63	
Total rejected ballots		922	2.37	+1.61
Turnout		38,851	70.31	–9.50
Eligible voters		55,260		
Liberal hold		Swing		–10.14
Progressive Conservative candidate Howard Earl Johnston gained 13.85 percentage points from the 1968 election, when he ran as a Social Credit.
Source: Library of Parliament

1968 Canadian federal election
Party	Candidate	Votes	%	±%
Liberal	William Douglas Stewart	11,370	35.99	–
New Democratic	James Patterson	9,552	30.23	–
Social Credit	Howard Earl Johnston	5,837	18.47	–
Progressive Conservative	David Wilson McKechnie	4,837	15.31	–
Total valid votes		31,596	99.23	
Total rejected ballots		244	0.77	–
Turnout		31,840	79.81	–
Eligible voters		39,897		
This riding was created from parts of Kamloops, Kootenay East and Okanagan—Revelstoke, which elected a Progressive Conservative, a Liberal and a Social Credit, respectively, in the last election. Social Credit Howard Earl Johnston was the incumbent from Okanagan—Revelstoke.
Source: Library of Parliament

== See also ==
- List of Canadian electoral districts
- Historical federal electoral districts of Canada
