= Parti de la Démocratisation Économique =

The Parti de la Démocratisation Économique (Party of Economic Democratization) was a group of five candidates in Quebec, Canada, who unsuccessfully sought election to the House of Commons of Canada in the 25 June 1968 federal election. Together, they won 2,651 votes, or 1.7% of the popular votes in the ridings in which they ran.

Election Results
Name of candidate	Riding	# of votes	% of popular vote
Guy-Gilles Lacombe	Papineau	537	2.4%
Emile Laporte	Gamelin	365	1.1%
Jean Meloche	Saint-Jean	214	1.2%
Sylvio-Robert St-Jean	Saint-Michel	711	2.1%
Pierre Therrien	Terrebonne	824	2.4%

- Source: Parliament of Canada History of the Federal Electoral Ridings since 1867

== See also ==
- List of political parties in Canada
