= Canadian social credit movement =

Political movement

The Canadian social credit movement is a political movement originally based on the Social Credit theory of Major C. H. Douglas. Its supporters were colloquially known as Socreds in English and créditistes in French. It gained popularity and its own political party in the 1930s, as a result of the Great Depression.

== Federal politics ==
The Western Social Credit League, an outgrowth of Alberta Social Credit, ran candidates in the 1935 federal election taking many votes from the Progressive Party of Canada and the United Farmers movement. In the 1940 federal election, Socreds ran with supporters of William Duncan Herridge as New Democracy, but reverted to the Social Credit name in subsequent elections with the Social Credit Association of Canada being officially formed in 1944. The party was generally fairly small, and gradually declined. The party won its last federal seats in Alberta in 1965. (SC MP Robert Norman Thompson (Red Deer) went on to be elected as a Conservative in 1968.)

In the 1960s, the Québécois wing of the party split off to form the Ralliement créditiste. The two wings reunited in 1971. The party was left without any parliamentary seats following the 1980 federal election. The Ralliement créditiste declined into irrelevance thereafter; however, it nominally continued to exist until 1993.

== Alberta ==
The ideology was embraced by the Reverend William Aberhart ("Bible Bill"), who formed the Alberta Social Credit League in 1934. He added a heavy dose of fundamentalist Christianity to Douglas' social credit theory. Social Credit won the 1935 provincial election in a massive landslide, and Aberhart became Premier of Alberta. His government was probably the only one in the world known to have adhered to the social credit ideology. In fact, following the 1937 Social Credit backbenchers' revolt in which Aberhart's government was pressured to implement its fiscal program, he once tried to implement social credit by issuing "prosperity certificates" to Albertans. This measure was disallowed by the Supreme Court of Canada on the basis that only the federal government was authorized to issue currency.

Aberhart died in office in 1943, and was replaced by Ernest Manning. Although Manning had been an early supporter of Social Credit, he largely abandoned the theory while keeping the Social Credit name. He also purged the party of anti-Semites; although antisemitism had long been part of the party's populist rhetoric, it fell out of fashion after World War II.

The Alberta Socreds formed nine consecutive majority governments spanning 36 years, the longest unbroken run in government at the provincial level at the time. Largely due to Manning's leadership and to Alberta's powerful influence within the Canadian Social Credit movement, the Canadian social credit movement developed a strong social conservative tint.

The party lost its last MLAs in 1982 and never elected a member again. Although the party was no longer a significant force in Alberta politics, it had some support and briefly experienced a revival around 2005. However, in 2008, the party collapsed to only 0.2 percent of the vote, its worst showing since its founding in 1934. In 2017 it was renamed to the Pro-Life Alberta Political Association, which has only tenuous connections to its social credit heritage.

== British Columbia ==
In the 1930s and 1940s, the social credit movement in British Columbia was largely fractious. It was made up of various small groups, the largest of which being the Social Credit League. The British Columbian movement was largely at odds with the Albertan wing and sought to distance itself from William Aberhart's religious preaching.

The effective death of the movement came when former Tory W. A. C. Bennett was elected leader of the League in 1951. Bennett joined in order to use the party as a political vehicle. He quickly jettisoned the original ideology, and reorganized the party into the conservative populist British Columbia Social Credit Party.

Social Credit's first government in British Columbia was a very small minority, but they were elected to a majority a year later. After the minority, and 20 years of majority government, the party was defeated by the New Democratic Party of British Columbia. The NDP served only one term in Government, before the Social Credit Party was returned to office for four more terms of majority government under W. A. C. Bennett's son, Bill Bennett. Bennett was succeeded by Bill Vander Zalm in 1986, but Vander Zalm was forced to resign in 1991 in favour of Rita Johnston.

The Social Credit government was defeated by the NDP in the 1991 election, and was knocked down to third place. The party collapsed in the 1996 election when it failed to win a single seat in the legislature, and received only 0.4% of votes cast. Many of the party's mainstream members left to join the British Columbia Liberal Party, which emerged in the early 1990s as the new "free enterprise" coalition opposing the NDP.

The party quickly dwindled into fringe status, and since then has only existed in desultory fashion. It ran only two candidates in the 2001 election. The strongest candidate of the two, Grant Mitton, a former radio talk show host who received 17% of the vote in his riding, later left the party to form the British Columbia Party. The Social Credit party only ran two candidates in 2005, none in 2009, and one in 2013. The party was de-registered shortly afterward. It regained its registration in 2016, but after running only two candidates in the 2017 provincial election and none in 2020, the party lost its registration again in 2023.

== Quebec ==
The movement also caught on in Quebec in part because of the work of Louis Even who translated social credit literature into French, wrote his own articles on the subject and published and circulated periodicals to promote social credit theories. He and Gilberte Côté-Mercier founded a lay Christian group called the "Pilgrims of Saint Michael", based in Rougemont, Quebec, that promotes social credit monetary policy coupled with conservative Catholicism. The Pilgrims publish The Michael Journal in English and Vers Demain in French. The group is nicknamed "the White Berets" for the headgear worn by members.

Even and Côté-Mercier also founded the Union des électeurs in 1939 as a provincial party based on social credit theories and recruited Réal Caouette to the movement. Even and Armand Turpin ran federally as New Democracy candidates in the 1940 federal election, but none was elected. The movement was able to win a post World War II by-election under the Union des électeurs label, with Caouette being sent to the House of Commons of Canada. The Union broke with the Social Credit Party of Canada in 1947 over Ernest Manning's rejection of more orthodox social credit economic theory and his purge of anti-Semites from the social credit movement. The Union held more orthodox views in line with C.H. Douglas's original economic and political philosophy including a rejection of party politics in the belief that it should be replaced by a non-partisan "union of electors" in which elected officials would implement the popular will.

Caouette ran for re-election as a union des electeurs candidate and lost his seat in the 1949 federal election. Caouette continued to run in elections unsuccessfully through the 1950s over the objections of Even and Côté-Mercier and split with them on May 4, 1958 to form Ralliement des créditistes as the Quebec wing of the Social Credit Party of Canada with himself as leader. It achieved a major breakthrough in the 1962 federal election, and remained in the House of Commons under various names until 1980.

Social Credit was never able to form a provincial government in Quebec due to the near dominance of social conservative votes by the Union Nationale party from the 1930s into the 1960s. The Social Credit Party, however, soon became a major contender in Quebec for seats to the federal Parliament in the 1960s. Although BC and Alberta would elect a few Social Credit Members of Parliament (MPs) in that decade, it would be Quebec that maintained the party's national presence after 1962. Social Credit remained dominant in the other two provinces in provincial elections.

In the 1962 election, Social Credit won 26 of 75 seats in Quebec, beating the Progressive Conservative Party. They continued to finish in second place in terms of federal seats from Quebec until their last MPs fell with the minority government of Joe Clark in 1980. The most Social Credit ever captured in terms of the Quebec popular vote was 27.3% federally, and 11.2% provincially.

The Quebec wing of the movement broke from the rest of the party in 1963 to form its own Quebec-only federal Social Credit party, the Ralliement des créditistes. As a social conservative party, the party generally attracted voters who supported the Union Nationale in provincial elections.

The party formed a provincial wing in 1970, the Ralliement créditiste du Québec, which benefited as the UN declined after the death of Premier Daniel Johnson in 1968.

The growth of Quebec separatism stymied the rise of the provincial Créditistes. Although Parti Québécois is a social democratic party, it drew nationalist voters away from the Créditistes.

In the 1970 provincial election, the Liberals took 72 seats, followed by the Union Nationale with 17, and Ralliement créditiste du Québec with 12. The party was riven by internal dissent for the remainder of its history, capturing two seats in the 1973 election, and only one in the 1976 election, the last time a créditiste was elected to the Quebec National Assembly.

== New Brunswick ==
While Social Credit never won any seats in the New Brunswick Legislature, it won 3.1% of the vote in the 1948 provincial election, the party's first. Social Credit also ran candidates in 1952 and 1956 winning 0.5% and 1.6% of the vote respectively.

== Manitoba ==
In Manitoba, the party was able to win a few seats in the Legislature, and was the third party in each at various times. From 1936 to 1940, the party supported John Bracken's minority government, and in 1940 it joined Bracken's coalition government.

Of the ten elections from 1936–1973, the party won seats in seven. In the 1936 provincial election, Social Credit finished third, and in the 1941 provincial election, it tied for third. However, Social Credit never won more than 14% of the popular vote.

== Saskatchewan ==
In Saskatchewan, Social Credit won seats in the Legislature in two elections – 2 seats in the 1938 election, and 3 in the 1956 election. In 1956, the party held third party status. Social Credit was never able to win more than 16% of the popular vote.

== Ontario ==
In Ontario, the party unsuccessfully ran candidates in most provincial elections from 1945 until 1975, never obtaining electoral support beyond a negligible level.

The party faced serious divisions in the 1940s, 1960s and early 1970s due to attempted takeovers by fascist groups and was put in trusteeship by the federal party in 1972 when the fascist Western Guard succeeded in taking control.

The party continued as a registered party into the 1980s, not running candidates in the 1977 election and running only 5 candidates with interim leader John Turmel in the 1981 election. It was defunct by 1985.

== Other parties ==
Other political parties have also promoted social credit principles, including John Turmel's Christian Credit Party and Abolitionist Party of Canada, and the short-lived Canada Party. The Global Party of Canada also appears to promote social credit economic policies.

The Reform Party of Canada was founded in 1987 originally as a populist political vehicle for Western Canadian alienation with the federal government and national parties. Reform Party founder and leader Preston Manning was the son of former Alberta Social Credit Party leader Ernest Manning. The Reform Party became the largest conservative party in the Canadian House of Commons from 1993 on. In 2000 Reform dissolved to rebrand as the Canadian Alliance. In 2003 the Canadian Alliance merged with the Progressive Conservative Party to form the modern Conservative Party of Canada. This series of parties shared some conservative and populist appeal with the Social Credit parties but never adopted social credit monetary policies.

The Canadian Action Party had monetary reform policies in its platform, but was not considered to be a social credit party.

== See also ==
- List of Social Credit/Creditistes MPs
- Committee on Monetary and Economic Reform (COMER)
- Canadian Action Party
- Pilgrims of Saint Michael
- Australian League of Rights
- Social Credit Party (New Zealand)
- Reform Party of Canada
