= Okanagan—Revelstoke =

Former federal electoral district in British Columbia, Canada

Coordinates: 50.906°N 118.297°W

British Columbia electoral district

Defunct federal electoral district
- Legislature: House of Commons
- District created: 1952
- District abolished: 1966
- First contested: 1953
- Last contested: 1965

Okanagan—Revelstoke was a federal electoral district in British Columbia, Canada, that was represented in the House of Commons of Canada from 1953 to 1968. This riding was created in 1952 from parts of Kamloops and Yale ridings.

It was abolished in 1966 when it was redistributed into Kootenay West, Okanagan Boundary and Okanagan—Kootenay ridings.

== Members of Parliament ==
Parliament	Years	Member	Party
Riding created from Kamloops and Yale
22nd	1953–1957	George McLeod	Social Credit
23rd	1957–1958	George McLeod	Social Credit
24th	1958–1962	Stuart Fleming	Progressive Conservative
25th	1962–1963	Stuart Fleming	Progressive Conservative
26th	1963–1965	Stuart Fleming	Progressive Conservative
27th	1965–1968	Howard Earl Johnston	Social Credit
Riding dissolved into Kootenay West, Okanagan Boundary and Okanagan—Kootenay

== Election results ==
1965 Canadian federal election
Party	Candidate	Votes	%	±%
Social Credit	Howard Earl Johnston	4,294	27.44	+7.34
Liberal	Frank F. Becker	4,060	25.95	+2.77
Progressive Conservative	John Gracey	3,983	25.45	–9.72
New Democratic	Walter D. Inglis	3,176	20.30	–1.26
Communist	Alexander W. Mowers	135	0.86	–
Total valid votes		15,648	99.30	
Total rejected ballots		110	0.70	+0.20
Turnout		15,758	76.21	–8.58
Eligible voters		20,677		
Social Credit gain from Progressive Conservative		Swing		+2.28
Source: Library of Parliament

1963 Canadian federal election
Party	Candidate	Votes	%	±%
Progressive Conservative	Stuart Fleming	5,800	35.17	+1.11
Liberal	Everard Clarke	3,821	23.17	–0.14
New Democratic	Isobel Pothecary	3,554	21.55	–2.71
Social Credit	Peer Vernon Paynter	3,314	20.10	+1.74
Total valid votes		16,489	99.50	
Total rejected ballots		83	0.50	–0.31
Turnout		16,572	84.79	+2.71
Eligible voters		19,545		
Progressive Conservative hold		Swing		+0.63
Source: Library of Parliament

1962 Canadian federal election
Party	Candidate	Votes	%	±%
Progressive Conservative	Stuart Fleming	5,265	34.06	–13.88
New Democratic	Les McLean	3,751	24.27	+11.54
Liberal	Franklyn Valair	3,604	23.32	+7.38
Social Credit	Bob Thomas	2,837	18.35	–3.64
Total valid votes		15,457	99.19	
Total rejected ballots		127	0.81	+0.14
Turnout		15,584	82.08	–0.83
Eligible voters		18,987		
Progressive Conservative hold		Swing		–12.72
Source: Library of Parliament

1958 Canadian federal election
Party	Candidate	Votes	%	±%
Progressive Conservative	Stuart Fleming	7,004	47.94	+23.55
Social Credit	George McLeod	3,213	21.99	–17.68
Liberal	Hilda Luella Cryderman	2,329	15.94	–9.26
Co-operative Commonwealth	Jacob Jack Dyck	1,859	12.72	+1.99
Labor–Progressive	Alexander W. Mowers	205	1.40	–
Total valid votes		14,610	99.32	
Total rejected ballots		100	0.68	+0.21
Turnout		14,710	82.91	+3.00
Eligible voters		17,742		
Progressive Conservative gain from Social Credit		Swing		+20.62
Source: Library of Parliament

1957 Canadian federal election
Party	Candidate	Votes	%	±%
Social Credit	George McLeod	5,376	39.67	+9.58
Liberal	Hilda Luella Cryderman	3,415	25.20	–3.22
Progressive Conservative	Stuart Fleming	3,305	24.39	+6.25
Co-operative Commonwealth	Jacob Jack Dyck	1,455	10.74	–9.24
Total valid votes		13,551	99.53	
Total rejected ballots		64	0.47	–0.64
Turnout		13,615	79.91	+8.41
Eligible voters		17,038		
Social Credit hold		Swing		+6.40
Source: Library of Parliament

1953 Canadian federal election
Party	Candidate	Votes	%	±%
Social Credit	George McLeod	3,537	30.10	–
Liberal	Hilda Luella Cryderman	3,340	28.42	–
Co-operative Commonwealth	Arthur Southcombe Parker	2,348	19.98	–
Progressive Conservative	Theodore Robert Bruce Adams	2,132	18.14	–
Labor–Progressive	John Henry Codd	395	3.36	–
Total valid votes		11,752	98.89	
Total rejected ballots		132	1.11	–
Turnout		11,884	71.50	–
Eligible voters		16,622		
This riding was created from parts of Kamloops and Yale, which elected a Progressive Conservative and a Co-operative Commonwealth candidate, respectively, in the previous election.
Source: Library of Parliament

== See also ==
- List of Canadian electoral districts
- Historical federal electoral districts of Canada
