= Stuart Fleming =

Canadian politician

Stuart A. Fleming

Member of Parliament for Okanagan—Revelstoke
- In office March 1958 – September 1965

Personal details
- Born: 9 June 1920 Vernon, British Columbia, Canada
- Died: 24 February 1993 (aged 72) Vernon, British Columbia, Canada
- Party: Progressive Conservative
- Profession: wholesaler

Stuart A. Fleming (9 June 1920 – 24 February 1993) was a Progressive Conservative party member of the House of Commons of Canada. He was a wholesaler by career.

He was first elected at the Okanagan—Revelstoke riding in the 1958 general election after an unsuccessful attempt to win that riding in 1957. Fleming was re-elected in 1962 and 1963. After completing his final term, the 26th Canadian Parliament, in 1965, Fleming left Parliament and did not campaign in further federal elections. He died in Vernon in 1993, aged 72.
