= William Duncan Herridge =

Canadian politician

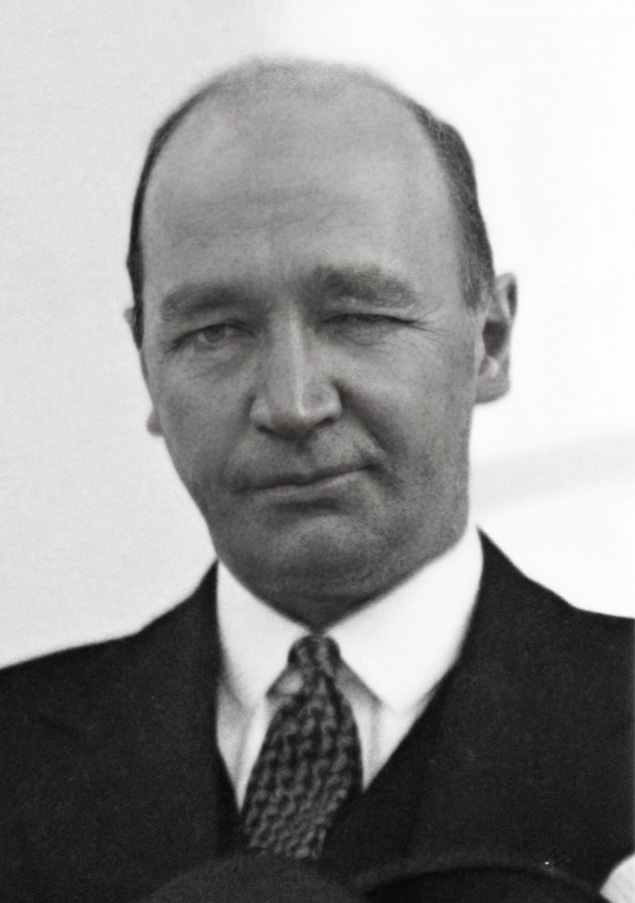
- Headshot of William D. Herridge in 1933.

Leader of New Democracy
- In office 1933–1944

2nd Envoy Extraordinary of Canada to the United States
- In office March 9, 1931 – 1935
- Prime Minister: R. B. Bennett
- Preceded by: Vincent Massey
- Succeeded by: H.H. Wrong

Personal details
- Born: 18 September 1887 Ottawa, Ontario, Canada
- Died: 21 September 1961 (aged 74)
- Resting place: Beechwood Cemetery, Ottawa, Ontario
- Party: Liberal (til 1926); Conservative (1926-1939); New Democracy (1939-1944)
- Spouse(s): Rose Fleck (1916–1925); Mildred Mariann Bennett (1931–1938)
- Children: William Richard Bennett Herridge
- Occupation: Lawyer; Diplomat
- Awards: Distinguished Service Order, Military Cross & Bar

Military service
- Allegiance: Canada
- Branch/service: Canadian Expeditionary Force
- Years of service: 1915–1919
- Rank: Major
- Battles/wars: World War I

William Duncan Herridge PC QC MC DSO (September 18, 1887 – September 21, 1961) was a Canadian politician and diplomat.

== Early life ==
He was the son of Reverend William T. Herridge, DD (1857-1929), a former (1914) moderator of the Presbyterian Church in Canada, and Minister of St. Andrew's Presbyterian Church (Ottawa) from 1883 until 1919.

Herridge was educated at Ottawa Collegiate Institute, the University of Toronto, where he was a member of the Kappa Alpha Society, and Osgoode Hall Law School.

He served in the Canadian Expeditionary Force during World War I in which he received a field promotion to the rank of Major and was awarded the Military Cross and the Distinguished Service Order.

== Career ==
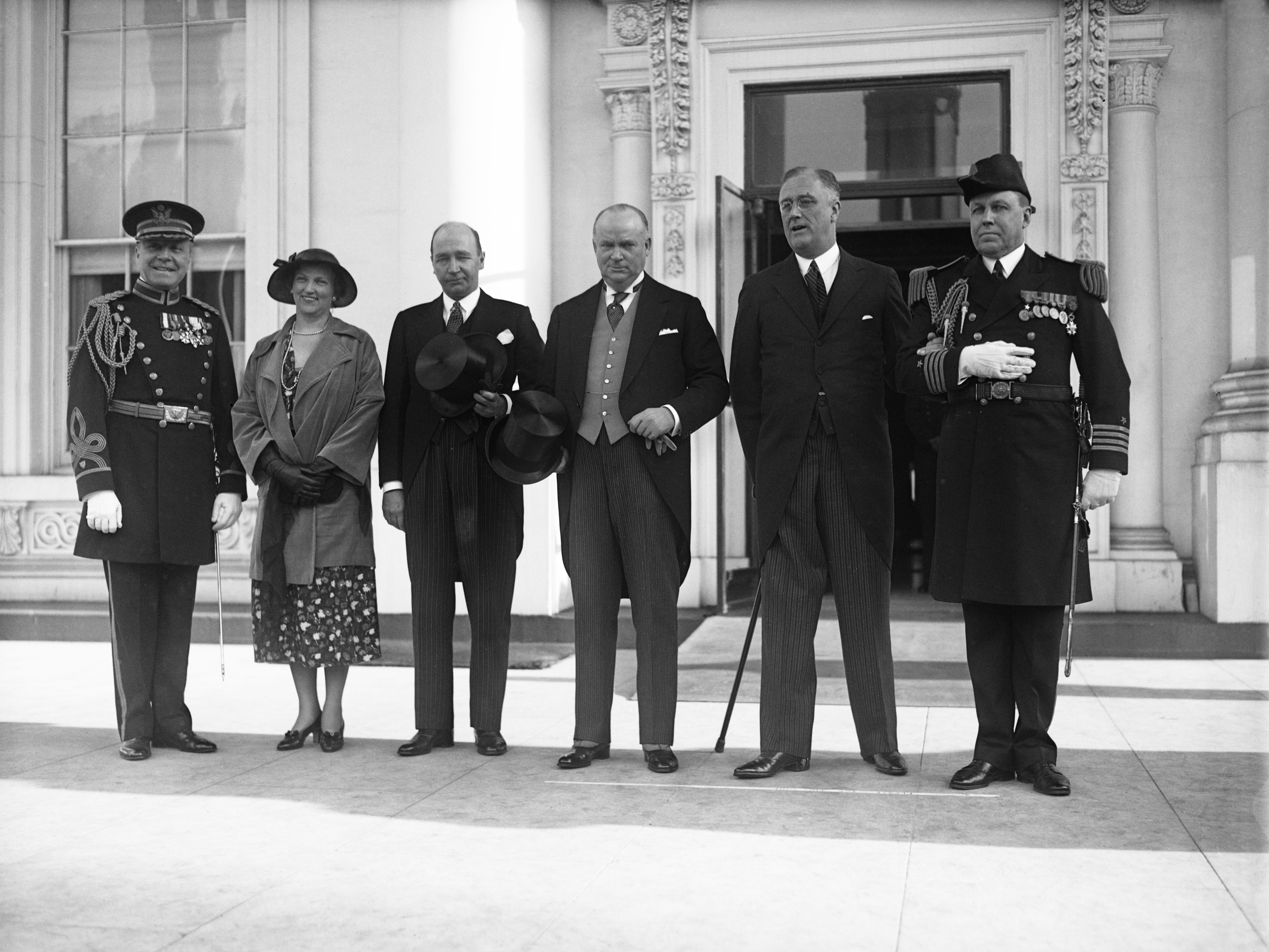
Herridge (third from left, with his wife) and R. B. Bennett (center) visiting Franklin D. Roosevelt at the White House in 1933

Herridge was a patent attorney by profession and had been a Liberal Party supporter but, being a personal friend of Governor General Byng, he broke with the Liberals in 1926 over the King-Byng Affair. He joined R.B. Bennett's 1930 federal election campaign acting as speechwriter and policy advisor to the Conservative leader. When the Tories took power, he was appointed Canada's envoy to the United States with the title Envoy Extraordinary and Minister Plenipotentiary for Canada in the United States of America, from 1931 to 1935, succeeding his friend, Vincent Massey. In 1931, he married Bennett's sister, Mildred. She died in New York City in May 1938, leaving a young son, William Robert Bennett Herridge (1932-2024). His first wife was Rose Fleck (1887-1925), granddaughter of Ottawa River lumber and railroad tycoon John Rudolphus Booth.

While stationed in Washington, D.C., Herridge was impressed by President Franklin D. Roosevelt and his New Deal, and convinced Bennett to attempt to adopt similar policies in Canada for combatting the Great Depression. Bennett's turn towards reform occurred too late in his term, however, and his government was soundly defeated in the 1935 election.

Herridge returned to Canada and was a delegate to the 1938 National Conservative Party Convention and raised hackles when he made an attack on a policy resolution that endorsed orthodox finance policy, rejecting the New Deal policies advocated by Bennett and Herridge in the last days of Bennett's government. He dismissed the resolution as "little more than junk" and "the supreme accomplishment of reaction within this party." Herridge warns that unless the party adopted a reform program it would die and lamented the loss of his brother-in-law as party leader due to "the powers of reaction, and the stirring up of racial and religious strife." Herridge's comments were not well received and elicited a round of boos and jeers of "go back to the States" and "Jeremiah" from the delegates and his amendments were rejected.

== New Democracy Party ==
His ideas rejected by the Conservative Party, Herridge, in 1939, launched the New Democracy party, which advocated monetary reform and government intervention in the economy. The party's positions were similar to those of the Social Credit Party of Canada. The two parties ran a joint slate in the 1940 election under the New Democracy banner with Herridge as the lead candidate. Herridge, however, came in third in the riding of Kindersley, Saskatchewan with 30% of the vote and thus failed to win a seat in the House of Commons of Canada. The only New Democracy Members of Parliament elected were those who had been elected to parliament for the Social Credit Party. After the election, the New Democracy party folded, and its MPs reverted to their previous identity as Social Credit members.
