= 1940 Canadian federal election =

- March 26, 1940

245 seats in the House of Commons 123 seats needed for a majority
- Turnout: 69.9% (▼4.3 pp)
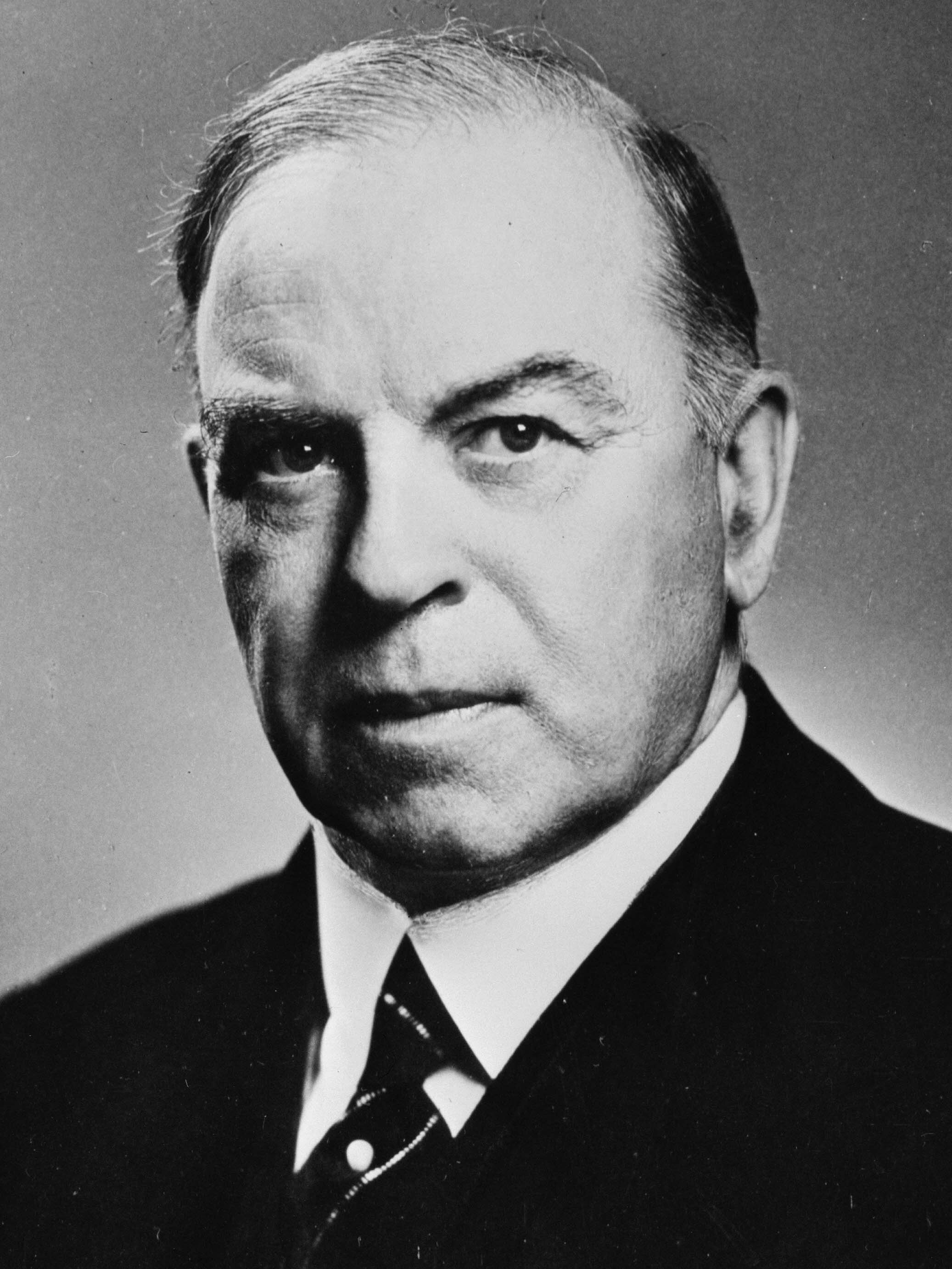

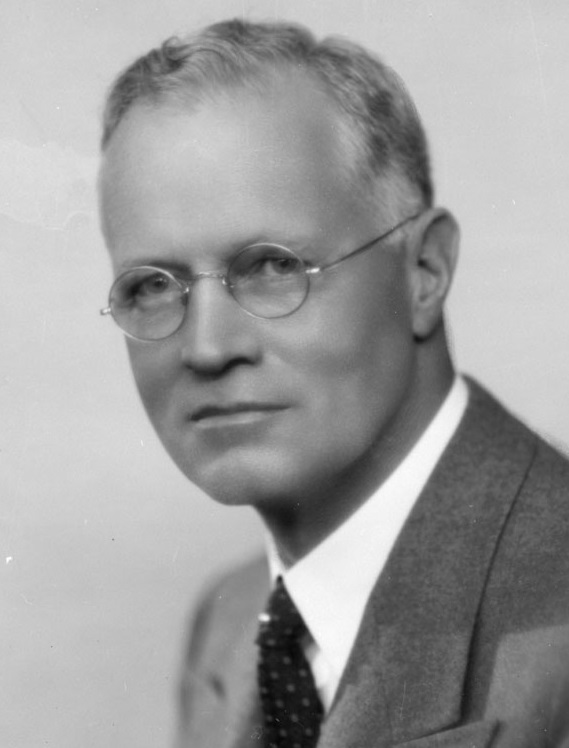

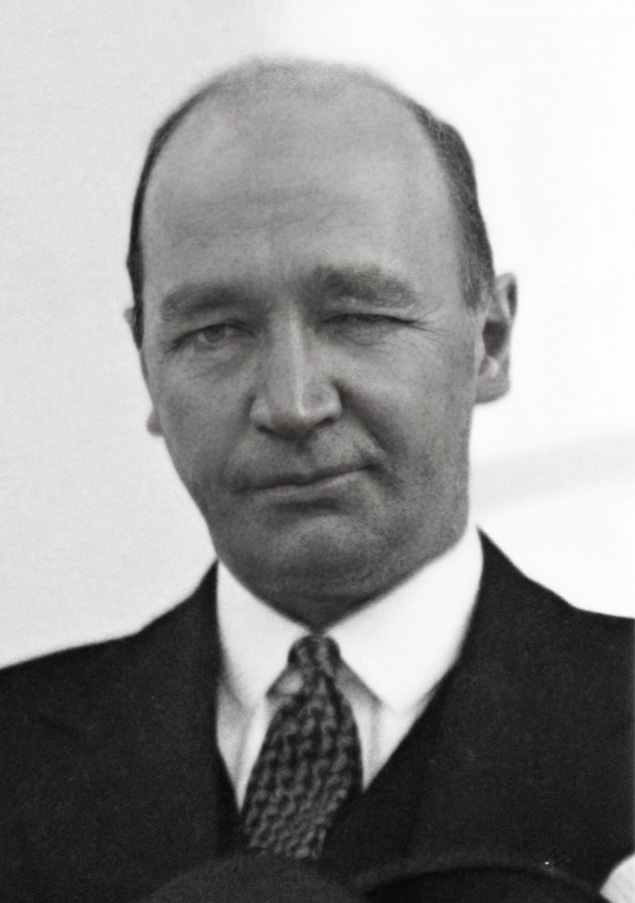

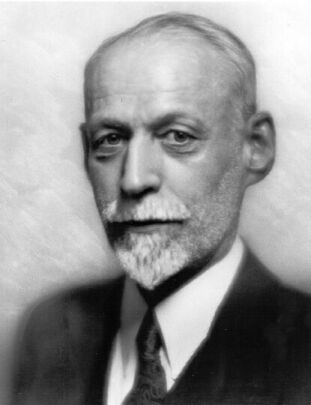
	First party	Second party
Leader	W. L. Mackenzie King	Robert Manion
Party	Liberal	National Government
Leader since	August 7, 1919	July 7, 1938
Leader's seat	Prince Albert	Ran in Fort William (lost)
Last election	173 seats, 44.68%	39 seats, 29.84%
Seats won	179	39
Seat change	▲6	Steady
Popular vote	2,365,979	1,348,260
Percentage	51.32%	29.24%
Swing	▲6.64 pp	▼0.60 pp
	Third party	Fourth party
Leader	William D. Herridge	J. S. Woodsworth
Party	New Democracy^{2}	Co-operative Commonwealth
Leader since	1939	August 1, 1932
Leader's seat	Ran in Kindersley (lost)	Winnipeg North Centre
Last election	17 seats, 4.10%	7 seats, 9.31%
Seats won	10	8
Seat change	▼7	▲1
Popular vote	119,354	392,615
Percentage	2.59%	8.42%
Swing	▼1.51 pp	▼1.07 pp

- The Canadian parliament after the 1940 election
Prime Minister before election
William Lyon Mackenzie King
Liberal
Prime Minister after election
William Lyon Mackenzie King
Liberal

The 1940 Canadian federal election was held March 26, 1940, to elect members of the House of Commons of Canada of the 19th Parliament of Canada. Prime Minister William Lyon Mackenzie King's Liberal Party was re-elected to their second consecutive majority government.

The election was overshadowed by the Second World War, which caused many Canadians to rally around the government. In response to this, the Conservative Party of Robert Manion ran on a platform advocating the creation of an all-party national unity government and ran under the name "National Government" in this election. Though Manion was personally opposed to conscription, the Liberals faced intense pressure in Quebec on the question and promised not to institute the measure. This promise was to haunt the Liberals as they faced increasing pressure from the military and especially from English Canada to bring in the measure. To release him from his September 1939 promise, King called a plebiscite in 1942 on the question. It was the most successful election for the Liberal Party in its history, in which it captured 73% of the seats in the House of Commons. By contrast, the Conservatives performed even worse than in the previous election, finishing with the same number of seats, a slightly lower share of the popular vote, and with Manion being defeated in his riding. This was the last election contested by the original incarnation of the Conservatives, who thereafter merged with remnants of the moribund Progressive Party to form the Progressive Conservatives.

Social Credit ran jointly with the New Democracy movement of William Duncan Herridge.

Some candidates of the Conservative and Social Credit parties insisted on running under the traditional names, however.

The Co-operative Commonwealth Federation (CCF) gained its first seat east of Manitoba, with the election of Clarence Gillis from Cape Breton Island. This election was the last one for its ailing leader, J. S. Woodsworth.

== National results ==

Party	Party leader	# of candidates	Seats			Popular vote		
Party	Party leader	# of candidates	1935	Elected	% Change	#	%	pp Change
Liberal	W. L. Mackenzie King	242	173	179	+2.3%	2,365,979	51.32%	+6.64
National Government ^{1}	Robert Manion	199	*	36	-	1,348,260	29.24%	+0.57
Conservative ^{1}	Robert Manion	8	39	3	-	53,799	1.17%	+0.57
Co-operative Commonwealth	J. S. Woodsworth	94	7	8	+14.3%	392, 615	8.51%	-0.09
Social Credit^{2}	J.H. Blackmore	9	17	7	-41.17%	46,271	1.00%	-1.51
New Democracy^{2} ^{3}	W.D. Herridge	19	*	3	-41.17%	73,869	1.59%	-1.51
Liberal–Progressive		4	4	3	-25.0%	27,815	0.60%	-0.07
Independent Liberal		32	1	2	+100%	147,216	3.19%	+1.96
Independent		19	1	1	-	57,247	1.24%	+0.85
Independent Conservative		5	1	1	-	10,431	0.23%	+0.21
Unity		2	*	1^{4}	*	12,337	0.27%	*
United Reform Movement		1	*	1	*	13,868	0.30%	*
Independent National		2	*	-	*	12,710	0.28%	*
Unknown		1	-	-	-	110	*	-
Communist	Tim Buck	8	-	-	-	8,699	0.19%	-0.27
Farmer-Labour		2	*	-	*	8,126	0.18%	*
National Unity		1	*	-	*	7,534	0.16%	*
United Farmers of Ont.-Labour		1	-	-	-	4,761	0.10%	-0.06
Labour		1	-	-	-	3,916	0.08%	-0.25
United Progressive		1	*	-	*	2,727	0.06%	*
National Liberal Progressive		1	*	-	*	2,434	0.05%	*
National Labour		1	*	-	*	2,354	0.05%	*
Anti-Conscriptionist		1	*	-	*	642	0.01%	*
Canadian Labour		1	*	-	*	398	0.01%	*
United Reform		1	*	-	*	269	0.01%	*
Social Credit-National Unity		1	*	-	*	241	0.01%	*
Total		657	245	245	-0.8%	4,610,603	100%	
Sources: http://www.elections.ca -- History of Federal Ridings since 1867

Notes:

* The party did not nominate candidates in the previous election.

x - less than 0.005% of the popular vote

^{1} "Change" and "% Change% figures compare total of "National Government" and "Conservative" to 1935 Conservative vote.

^{2} New Democracy and Social Credit ran jointly under the New Democracy banner under the leadership of former Conservative William Duncan Herridge who had founded New Democracy in 1939 to promote his ideas monetary and economic reform, though several candidates continued to run under the old Social Credit name. The 3 New Democracy MPs elected were all Social Credit incumbents, including Social Credit parliamentary leader John Horne Blackmore while Herridge himself failed to win his seat. The party sat in the House of Commons under the New Democracy name until 1944 when its national convention voted to revert to the Social Credit name.

^{3}One candidate appears to have run under the "New Democratic Party" banner. It is unlikely that this was related in any way to the Cooperative Commonwealth Federation's adoption of this name in 1960. This may be a mis-reporting of party label - this may have been a "New Democracy" candidate.

^{4}MP elected was Dorise Nielsen who ran and was elected as a Progressive Unity candidate (or United Progressive Movement (UPM) in North Battleford but was a covert member of the Communist Party of Canada. When the Communist Party was refounded in 1943 as the Labor-Progressive Party, Nielsen openly joined the party and became an LPP MP.

== Vote and seat summaries ==
Ternary plots - shift of electoral support (1935-1940)
1935

1940
Electoral districts identified by colours of winning parties

Popular vote
Liberal	51.32%
National Government	29.24%
CCF	8.42%
New Democracy	2.59%
Others	8.43%

Seat totals
Liberal	73.06%
National Government	15.91%
New Democracy	4.08%
CCF	3.26%
Liberal-Progressive	1.22%
Others	2.44%

== Results by province ==
Party name		BC	AB	SK	MB	ON	QC	NB	NS	PE	YK	Total
Liberal	Seats:	10	7	12	13	56	62	5	10	4	-	179
Liberal	Popular Vote:	37.4	37.9	43.0	43.5	50.3	64.4	54.6	50.4	55.3	46.4	51.3
National Government	Seats:	4	-	2	1	22	-	5	1	-	1	36
National Government	Vote:	28.8	13.0	14.1	26.2	40.2	18.0	43.4	40.1	44.7	53.6	30.0
Conservative	Seats:			-	-	3	-					3
Conservative	Vote:			0.2	1.7	2.2	1.1					1.2
Co-operative Commonwealth	Seats:	1	-	5	1	-	-	-	1			8
Co-operative Commonwealth	Vote:	28.4	13.0	28.7	19.6	3.8	0.7	0.4	6.0			8.6
Social Credit	Seats:		7		-							7
Social Credit	Vote:		16.5		0.6							1.0
New Democracy	Seats:	-	3	-	-		-					3
New Democracy	Vote:	0.1	18.0	3.3	0.4		0.9					1.6
Liberal-Progressive	Seats:				2	1						3
Liberal-Progressive	Vote:				4.7	0.8						0.6
Independent Liberal	Seats:	-				-	2	-	-			2
Independent Liberal	Vote:	xx				1.0	10.2	1.6	3.3			3.3
Independent	Seats:	1	-	-	-	-	-		-			1
Independent	Vote:	3.0	0.2	1.0	3.4	0.4	2.1		0.2			1.3
United Reform Movement	Seats:			1								1
United Reform Movement	Vote:			3.7								0.3
Unity	Seats:			1								1
Unity	Vote:			3.3								0.3
Independent Conservative	Seats:						1					1
Independent Conservative	Vote:						0.9					0.2
Total Seats		16	17	21	17	82	65	10	12	4	1	245
Parties that won no seats:
Independent Nat. Gov.	Vote:	0.1					1.1					0.3
Communist	Vote:	0.4	0.3	0.6	xx	0.2	0.1					0.2
Farmer-Labour	Vote:					0.5						0.2
National Unity	Vote:			2.0								0.2
NDP (?)	Vote:	1.6				xx						0.2
UFO-Labour	Vote:					0.3						0.1
Unknown	Vote:					xx						0.1
Labour	Vote:						0.3					0.1
United Progressive	Vote:			1.0								0.1
National Liberal Progressive	Vote:					0.2						0.1
National Labour	Vote:						0.2					0.1
Anti-Conscriptionist	Vote:						0.1					xx
Canadian Labour	Vote:					xx						xx
United Reform	Vote:			0.1								xx

- xx - less than 0.05% of the popular vote

== See also ==
- List of Canadian federal general elections
- List of political parties in Canada
- 19th Canadian Parliament
