= New Democracy (Canada) =

Former political party in Canada (1940–1944)

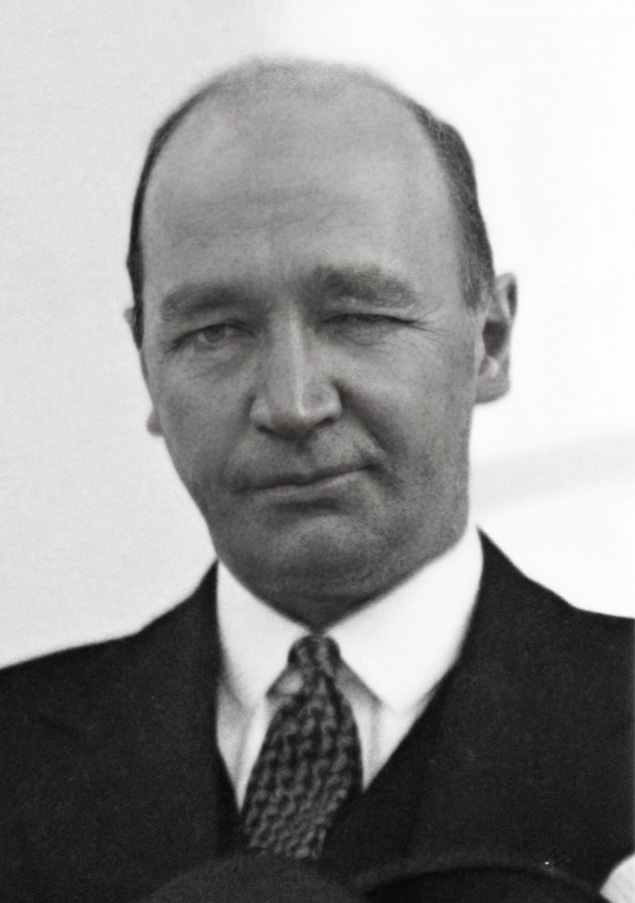
William Duncan Herridge

New Democracy (French: Nouvelle démocratie) was a political party in Canada founded by William Duncan Herridge in 1939. Herridge, a former Conservative party adviser, had been Canada's Envoy to the United States from 1931–1935 during the government of R. B. Bennett; who was Herridge's brother-in-law.

Herridge advocated monetary reform and government intervention in the economy as a means of fighting the Great Depression. His ideas were similar to those of the social credit movement, and in the 1940 election, the Social Credit Party of Canada joined with Herridge to run candidates jointly under the New Democracy umbrella.

The experiment was unsuccessful as Herridge failed to win a seat, and the three New Democracy Members of Parliament elected (John Horne Blackmore, Robert Fair, and Walter Frederick Kuhl) were Social Credit supporters. The name New Democracy remained associated with the national Social Credit movement until 1944, when the name Social Credit was readopted at a national convention held in Toronto.

== Election results ==
Election	Party Leader	# of candidates nominated	# of seats won	# of total votes	% of popular vote
1940	W. D. Herridge	17	3	73,083	1.59%

== See also ==
- List of political parties in Canada
- William Arthur Steel
