= List of Canadian conservative leaders =

This is a list of federal leaders after Confederation who were members of federal conservative parties.

== Tory leaders since Confederation ==
This is a list of leaders of the Conservative Party of Canada (historical) (1867–1942), Progressive Conservative Party of Canada (1942–2003), and Conservative Party of Canada (2003–present) ("the Tory parties"), and of prime ministers of Canada after Confederation who were members of those parties.

=== Conservative (1867–1942) ===
Name	From	To	Riding as leader	Notes
Sir John A. Macdonald	July 1, 1867	June 6, 1891	Kingston, ON (1867–18, 1887–91); Victoria, BC (1878–82); Carleton, ON (1882–88)	1st Prime Minister
Sir John Abbott	June 16, 1891	November 24, 1892	Senator for Inkerman, QC	3rd Prime Minister
Sir John Sparrow David Thompson	December 5, 1892	December 12, 1894	Antigonish, NS	4th Prime Minister
Sir Mackenzie Bowell	December 21, 1894	April 27, 1896	Senator for Hastings, ON	5th Prime Minister
Sir Charles Tupper	May 1, 1896	February 6, 1901	Cape Breton, NS	6th Prime Minister
Sir Robert Laird Borden	February 6, 1901	July 10, 1920	Halifax, NS (1900–04, 1908–17); Carleton, ON (1905–08); Kings, NS (1917–21)	8th Prime Minister
Arthur Meighen	July 10, 1920	September 24, 1926	Portage la Prairie, MB (1908–21, 1925–26); Grenville, ON (1922–25)	9th Prime Minister
Hugh Guthrie (interim leader)	October 11, 1926	October 12, 1927	Wellington South	
R. B. Bennett	October 12, 1927	July 7, 1938	Calgary West, AB	11th Prime Minister
Robert Manion	July 7, 1938	May 14, 1940	London, ON	Resigned after lost seat in 1940 election
Richard Hanson (interim leader)	May 14, 1940	November 12, 1941	York—Sunbury, NB	
Arthur Meighen	November 12, 1941	December 9, 1942	Senator for St. Marys, Ontario	Resigned after defeat in attempt to enter House of Commons via York South by-election

=== Progressive Conservative Party of Canada (1942–2003) ===
Picture	Name	Term start	Term end	Riding as leader	Notes
	John Bracken	December 11, 1942	July 20, 1948	Neepawa	Former Premier of Manitoba
	George Drew	October 2, 1948	November 29, 1956	Carleton	Former Premier of Ontario
	William Earl Rowe	November 29, 1956 (Interim)	December 14, 1956	Dufferin—Simcoe	Interim leader until 1956 leadership convention
	John Diefenbaker	December 14, 1956	September 9, 1967	Prince Albert	13th Prime Minister of Canada
	Robert Stanfield	September 9, 1967	February 22, 1976	Halifax	Former Premier of Nova Scotia
	Joe Clark	February 22, 1976	February 19, 1983	Rocky Mountain, Yellowhead	16th Prime Minister of Canada
	Erik Nielsen	February 19, 1983 (Interim)	June 11, 1983	Yukon	Interim leader until 1983 leadership convention
	Brian Mulroney	June 11, 1983	June 13, 1993	Central Nova, Manicouagan, Charlevoix	18th Prime Minister of Canada
	Kim Campbell	June 13, 1993	December 14, 1993	Vancouver Centre	19th Prime Minister of Canada
	Jean Charest	December 14, 1993	April 2, 1998	Sherbrooke	Former Premier of Quebec
	Elsie Wayne	April 2, 1998 (Interim)	November 14, 1998	Saint John	Interim until 1998 leadership election
	Joe Clark	November 14, 1998	May 31, 2003	Kings—Hants, Calgary Centre	His second tenure as leader
	Peter MacKay	May 31, 2003	December 7, 2003	Central Nova	Final leader of the Progressive Conservative Party; merged the PC Party with Stephen Harper's Canadian Alliance in 2003, cofounding the new Conservative Party of Canada.

=== Conservative Party of Canada (2003–present) ===
Leader		Term start	Term end	Constituency	Notes
—	John Lynch-Staunton	7 December 2003	20 March 2004	Senator for Grandville, Quebec	Interim leader, served concurrently as Senate Opposition Leader.
1st	Stephen Harper	20 March 2004	19 October 2015; Acting: 19 October 2015 – 4 November 2015	Calgary Southwest, Alberta	First official leader of the modern Conservative Party of Canada; Served as Leader of the Official Opposition from 2004–2006, and Prime Minister from 2006–2015.
—	Rona Ambrose	5 November 2015	27 May 2017	Sturgeon River—Parkland, Alberta	Interim leader, served concurrently as Leader of the Official Opposition.
2nd	Andrew Scheer	27 May 2017	24 August 2020	Regina—Qu'Appelle, Saskatchewan	Served concurrently as Leader of the Official Opposition 2017–2020; (resigned 12 December 2019, remained leader until his successor was chosen on 24 August 2020).
3rd	Erin O'Toole	24 August 2020	2 February 2022	Durham, Ontario	Served concurrently as Leader of the Official Opposition 2020–2022; (removed 2 February 2022 by the Conservative caucus).
—	Candice Bergen	2 February 2022	10 September 2022	Portage—Lisgar, Manitoba	Interim leader, served concurrently as Leader of the Official Opposition 2022.
4th	Pierre Poilievre	10 September 2022	Incumbent	Carleton, Ontario (2004-2025) None (2025); Battle River—Crowfoot, Alberta (2025-present)	Served concurrently as Leader of the Official Opposition until being unseated in the 2025 Canadian federal election. He returned to Parliament in the 2025 Battle River—Crowfoot federal by-election, thus again becoming Leader of the Official Opposition.

== Conservative prime ministers of Canada ==
This is a list of prime ministers of Canada after Confederation who were members of the Conservative Party of Canada (1867–1942), Progressive Conservative Party of Canada (1942–2003), and Conservative Party of Canada (2003–present).

=== Conservative (1867–1942) ===
- Sir John A. Macdonald (1867–1873, 1878–1891)
- Sir John Abbott (1891–1892)
- Sir John Sparrow David Thompson (1892–1894)
- Sir Mackenzie Bowell (1894–1896)
- Sir Charles Tupper (1896)
- Sir Robert Borden (1911–1920)
- Arthur Meighen (1920–1921, 1926)
- R. B. Bennett (1930–1935)^{[a]}

=== Progressive Conservative Party of Canada (1942–2003) ===
- John Diefenbaker (1957–1963)
- Joe Clark (1979–1980)
- Brian Mulroney (1984–1993)
- Kim Campbell (1993)

=== Conservative Party of Canada (2003–present) ===
- Stephen Harper (2006–2015)

== Electoral performance of Tory leaders ==
=== Conservative (historical; 1867–1942) ===
Election	Leader	Party name	# of candidates nominated	# of seats won	+/–	Election Outcome	# of total votes	% of popular vote	Position
1867	John A. Macdonald	Conservatives, Liberal-Conservatives	112	100 / 180	▲100	▲1st	92,656	34.53%	Majority
1872	John A. Macdonald	Conservatives, Liberal-Conservatives, one Conservative Labour	140	100 / 200	Steady	1st	123,100	38.66%	Minority
1874	John A. Macdonald	Conservatives, Liberal-Conservatives, one Conservative Labour	104	65 / 206	▼35	▼2nd	99,440	30.58%	Opposition
1878	John A. Macdonald	Conservatives, Liberal-Conservatives	161	129 / 206	▲64	▲1st	229,191	42.06%	Majority
1882	John A. Macdonald	Conservatives, Liberal-Conservatives	168	136 / 215	▲7	1st	208,544	40.39%	Majority
1887	John A. Macdonald	Conservatives, Liberal-Conservatives	203	111 / 215	▼25	1st	343,805	47.41%	Majority
1891	John A. Macdonald	Conservatives, Liberal-Conservatives	212	117 / 215	▲6	1st	376,518	48.58%	Majority
1896	Charles Tupper	Conservatives, Liberal-Conservatives	207	98 / 213	▼19	▼2nd	467,415	48.17%	Opposition
1900	Charles Tupper	Conservatives, Liberal-Conservatives	204	79 / 213	▼19	2nd	438,330	46.1%	Opposition
1904	Robert Borden	Conservatives, Liberal-Conservatives	205	75 / 214	▼4	2nd	470,430	45.94%	Opposition
1908	Robert Borden	Conservatives, Liberal-Conservatives	211	85 / 221	▲10	2nd	539,374	46.21%	Opposition
1911	Robert Borden	Conservatives, Liberal-Conservatives and Nationalist Conservatives	212	132 / 221	▲47	▲1st	636,938	48.90%	Majority
1917	Robert Borden	Unionist Party	211	152 / 235	▲20	1st	1,070,694	56.93%	Majority
1921	Arthur Meighen	National Liberal and Conservative Party	204	49 / 235	▼103	▼3rd	935,651	29.95%	Third Party
1925	Arthur Meighen	Conservatives	232	114 / 245	▲65	▲1st	1,454,253	46.13%	Opposition (October 1925–June 1926)
1925	Arthur Meighen	Conservatives	232	114 / 245	▲65	▲1st	1,454,253	46.13%	Minority (June–September 1926)
1926	Arthur Meighen	Conservatives	232	91 / 245	▼23	▼2nd	1,476,834	45.34%	Opposition
1930	R. B. Bennett	Conservatives	229	135 / 245	▲44	▲1st	1,836,115	47.79%	Majority
1935	R. B. Bennett	Conservatives	228	39 / 245	▼96	▼2nd	1,290,671	29.84%	Opposition
1940	Robert James Manion	National Government	207	39 / 245	Steady	2nd	1,402,059	30.41%	Opposition

=== Progressive Conservative Party of Canada (1942–2003) ===
Election	Leader	Votes	%	Seats	+/–	Position	Role	Government
1945	John Bracken	1,448,744	27.62%	64 / 245	▲27	2nd	Opposition	Liberal minority
1949	George A. Drew	1,734,261	29.62%	41 / 262	▼23	2nd	Opposition	Liberal majority
1953	George A. Drew	1,749,579	31.01%	50 / 265	▲9	2nd	Opposition	Liberal majority
1957	John Diefenbaker	2,564,732	38.81%	112 / 265	▲62	▲1st	Minority	PC minority
1958	John Diefenbaker	3,908,633	53.56%	208 / 265	▲96	1st	Majority	PC majority
1962	John Diefenbaker	2,865,542	37.22%	116 / 265	▼92	1st	Minority	PC minority
1963	John Diefenbaker	2,591,613	32.80%	93 / 265	▼23	▼2nd	Opposition	Liberal minority
1965	John Diefenbaker	2,500,113	32.41%	95 / 265	▲2	2nd	Opposition	Liberal minority
1968	Robert Stanfield	2,554,397	31.43%	72 / 264	▼23	2nd	Opposition	Liberal majority
1972	Robert Stanfield	3,388,980	35.02%	107 / 264	▲35	2nd	Opposition	Liberal minority
1974	Robert Stanfield	3,371,319	35.46%	95 / 264	▼12	2nd	Opposition	Liberal majority
1979	Joe Clark	4,111,606	35.89%	136 / 282	▲41	▲1st	Minority	PC minority
1980	Joe Clark	3,552,994	32.49%	103 / 282	▼33	▼2nd	Opposition	Liberal majority
1984	Brian Mulroney	6,278,818	50.03%	211 / 282	▲108	▲1st	Majority	PC majority
1988	Brian Mulroney	5,667,543	43.02%	169 / 295	▼42	1st	Majority	PC majority
1993	Kim Campbell	2,178,303	16.04%	2 / 295	▼167	▼5th	No status	Liberal majority
1997	Jean Charest	2,446,705	18.84%	20 / 301	▲18	5th	Fifth party	Liberal majority
2000	Joe Clark	1,566,994	12.19%	12 / 301	▼8	5th	Fifth party	Liberal majority

=== Conservative Party of Canada (2003–present) ===
Election	Leader	Votes	%	Seats	+/–	Position	Government
2004	Stephen Harper	4,019,498	29.63%	99 / 308	▲21	2nd	Opposition
2006	Stephen Harper	5,374,071	36.37%	124 / 308	▲25	▲1st	Minority
2008	Stephen Harper	5,209,069	37.65%	143 / 308	▲19	1st	Minority
2011	Stephen Harper	5,832,401	39.62%	166 / 308	▲23	1st	Majority
2015	Stephen Harper	5,613,633	31.91%	99 / 338	▼67	▼2nd	Opposition
2019	Andrew Scheer	6,239,227	34.34%	121 / 338	▲22	2nd	Opposition
2021	Erin O'Toole	5,747,410	33.74%	119 / 338	▼2	2nd	Opposition
2025	Pierre Poilievre	8,089,941	41.3%	144 / 343	▲25	2nd	Opposition

== Other conservative parties' leaders ==
=== Parties that have had representation in the House of Commons ===
==== "Reform-Alliance" ====
===== Leaders of the Reform Party of Canada =====
- Preston Manning (October 31, 1987 – March 25, 2000)

===== Leaders of the Canadian Alliance =====
- Deborah Grey (March 27, 2000 – July 8, 2000) (interim)
- Stockwell Day (July 8, 2000 – December 12, 2001)
- John Reynolds (December 12, 2001 – March 20, 2002) (interim)
- Stephen Harper (March 20, 2002 – December 7, 2003)

==== Leaders of the Reconstruction Party of Canada ====
- Henry Herbert Stevens (1935–1938)

==== Leaders of the Social Credit Party of Canada ====
- John Horne Blackmore (1935–1944) (parliamentary leader)
- Solon Earl Low (1944–1961)
- Robert Thompson (1961–1967)
- Alexander Bell Patterson (1967–1968) (interim)
- Réal Caouette (1971–1976)
- André-Gilles Fortin (1976–1977)
- Gilles Caouette (1977–1978) (interim)
- Charles-Arthur Gauthier (1978) (interim)
- Lorne Reznowski (1978–1979)
- Charles-Arthur Gauthier (1979) (interim)
- Fabien Roy (1979–1980)
- Martin Hattersley (1981–1983)
- Ken Sweigard (1983–1986) (interim)
- Harvey Lainson (1986–1990)
- Ken Campbell (1990–1993)

==== Leader of the People's Party of Canada ====
- Maxime Bernier (September 14, 2018 – present)

=== Parties that have had no representation in the House of Commons ===
==== Leaders of the Christian Heritage Party of Canada ====
- Ed Vanwoudenberg (1987–1991)
- Charles Cavilla (1991–1993)
- Heather Stilwell (1993–1994) (interim)
- Jean Blaquière (1994–1995)
- Ron Gray (1995–2008)
- Jim Hnatiuk (2008–2014)
- David J. Reimer (2014) (interim)
- Rod Taylor (2014 – present)

==== Leaders of the Libertarian Party of Canada ====
- Sieg Pedde (1973–1974)
- Charles 'Chuck' Lyall (1974–1976)
- Ron Bailey (1976–1978)
- Alex Eaglesham (1978–1979)
- Linda Cain (1980–1982)
- Neil Reynolds (May 1982 – 1983)
- Victor Levis (1983–1987)
- Dennis Corrigan (1987–1990)
- Stanislaw Tyminski (1990–1991)
- George Dance (1991–1993)
- Hilliard Cox (May 1993 – 1995)
- George Dance (1995–1996)
- Vincent Pouliot (May 12, 1996 – April 5, 1997)
- Robert Morse (1997)
- Jean-Serge Brisson (1997 - May 18, 2008)^{[f]}
- Dennis Young (May 18, 2008 - May 2011)
- Katrina Chowne (May 2011 – May 2014)
- Tim Moen (May 2014 – 2021)
- Jacques Boudreau (2021 – present)

==== Leaders of the Progressive Canadian Party ====
- Ernie Schreiber (2004–2005) (interim)
- Tracy Parsons (2005–2007)
- Sinclair Stevens (2007–2016)
- Joe Hueglin (2016–2019)

==== Leaders of the Western Block Party ====
- Doug Christie (November 30, 2005 – March 11, 2013)
- Paul St. Laurent (March 11, 2013 – January 31, 2014)

==== Leader of the Alliance of the North ====
- François Bélanger (September 11, 2013 — present)

== Notes ==
- ^[a] Created Viscount Bennett following his retirement from office.
- ^[b] On this occasion, Meighen failed in his attempts to win re-election to the House of Commons, so Hanson remained Leader of the Opposition throughout Meighen's term
- ^[c] Bracken did not win election to the House of Commons until 1945, so Hanson remained Leader of the Opposition until January 1943, when he was replaced by Gordon Graydon
- ^[d] On two occasions when Drew was too ill to perform his duties, William Earl Rowe served as Leader of the Opposition
- ^[e] Michael Starr served as Leader of the Opposition until November 5, 1967, when Stanfield, who had previously been premier of Nova Scotia, won election to Parliament
- ^[f] Brisson led the party on an interim basis prior to being elected at a delegated convention in 2000.
