= Interim leader (Canada) =

Temporary leader of a Canadian political party

An interim leader, in Canadian politics, is a party leader appointed by the party's legislative caucus or the party's executive to temporarily act as leader when a gap occurs between the resignation or death of a party leader and the election of their formal successor. Usually a party leader retains the leadership until a successor is formally chosen — however, in some situations this is not possible, and an interim leader is thus appointed by the party's caucus or the party executive. An interim leader may also be appointed while a leader is on a leave of absence due to poor health or some other reason, and then relinquish the position upon the leader's return.

An interim leader has all the rights and responsibilities of an elected party leader, with the exception that the person does not have the discretion to choose the timing of their departure — an interim leader serves only until the party organizes and holds a leadership convention. By virtue of lacking a mandate from the party membership, however, an interim leader is not generally seen as possessing the authority to truly put his or her own ideological and organizational stamp on the party, and is thus effectively limited to a caretaker role in most cases.

There have been a number of instances where instead of a competitive leadership race between multiple candidates, the leadership convention directly ratified the interim leader as the party's new permanent leader, but a convention must still take place in some form.

By convention, if a competitive leadership race between sitting members of the party's caucus is taking place, the interim leader should normally be a caucus member who is not standing as a candidate in the leadership race, so they do not gain unfair advantage in the contest. Only in rare cases, such as when a minor party's interim leader is also its only caucus member in the legislature or when no other caucus colleagues are competing for the leadership positions, will an interim leader stand as a candidate for permanent leadership.

An interim leader may, if necessary, lead the party into an election, but convention discourages calling an election when a leadership race, particularly for the governing party or Official Opposition, is in progress.

== Practice ==
In most circumstances, a leader who has decided to step down gives extended notice, and a leadership convention is organized to choose their successor. The outgoing leader remains in the position for the duration of the leadership campaign, and then hands over power to the successor shortly after the convention.

However, sudden vacancies may occur for a variety of reasons.

=== Death in office ===
Wilfrid Laurier died in 1919, while holding the leadership of the Liberal Party. Daniel Duncan McKenzie was selected as the party's interim leader, serving until William Lyon Mackenzie King was selected as the party's leader later in the year.

Following the death of Daniel Johnson Sr. in 1968, Jean-Jacques Bertrand became interim leader of the Union Nationale and Premier of Quebec, until Bertrand was ratified as Johnson's permanent successor by a leadership convention.

Jack Layton initially took a leave of absence from the leadership of the New Democratic Party in 2011 for cancer treatment, and Nycole Turmel was named the interim leader of the party; Layton died before his intended date of return to office, and Turmel continued as interim leader pending the results of the 2012 leadership election.

=== Scandal ===
Glen Clark was forced to resign the leadership of the British Columbia New Democratic Party, and the premiership, after a criminal investigation against him was announced. He was succeeded by Dan Miller, who served until Ujjal Dosanjh won the resulting leadership convention.

=== Creation of a new party ===
In 2000, after the Reform Party was folded into the new Canadian Alliance, Deborah Grey served as the party's interim leader until the party's first leadership convention selected Stockwell Day. Similarly, after the Canadian Alliance and the Progressive Conservatives merged in 2003, Senator John Lynch-Staunton was named interim leader of the new Conservative Party until the first leadership convention selected Stephen Harper.

In 2017, following the merger of the Progressive Conservative Association of Alberta and the Wildrose Party into the United Conservative Party, Nathan Cooper was named interim leader pending a leadership election in which Progressive Conservative leader Jason Kenney and Wildrose leader Brian Jean were both candidates, with Kenney ultimately being chosen as the first permanent leader of the merged party.

=== Internal dissension ===
In 1983, Joe Clark received only 66.9 per cent support in an internal leadership review process conducted by the Progressive Conservative Party. Feeling that he did not have sufficiently strong support within the party, he thus scheduled a leadership convention. Initially, he remained the party's leader in the meantime — however, as he was also standing as a candidate in the leadership process, he eventually stepped down and Erik Nielsen was installed as the party's interim leader.

In early 2002, Stockwell Day's leadership of the Canadian Alliance came under criticism due to party infighting. Like Clark, he thus announced a new leadership campaign in which he would reoffer as a candidate, and John Reynolds became the party's interim leader.

=== Leader defeated in an election ===
In several cases, a party's leader has been defeated in his or her own riding in an election, and has resigned soon afterward. A resignation is not necessarily required in such a scenario, as other leaders in the same situation have retained the leadership until they were able to run in a by-election. However, for personal or political reasons some leaders have opted to immediately resign the leadership instead.

Andy Brandt became interim leader of the Ontario Progressive Conservative Party following the party's defeat in the 1987 provincial election, in which leader Larry Grossman lost his own seat. He served until 1990, when he was succeeded by Mike Harris following a leadership convention.

Jean Charest became interim leader of the federal Progressive Conservatives following the party's defeat in the 1993 election, in which Kim Campbell lost her own seat. At the next leadership convention in 1995, Charest was acclaimed to the full leadership of the party. Additionally, having subsequently become leader of the Quebec Liberal Party, Charest resigned as leader following the party's defeat in the 2012 provincial election, in which he lost his seat. As a result, Jean-Marc Fournier was named interim leader.

Joy MacPhail served as interim leader of the New Democratic Party of British Columbia from 2001 to 2003, following the party's defeat in the 2001 provincial election, in which Ujjal Dosanjh lost his seat. She served until Carole James was selected as the party's new leader in 2003.

John Tory was defeated in the 2007 Ontario election, in which he ran in a different seat than the one where he was an incumbent. He stayed on as leader, despite facing some internal criticism — notably, a leadership review in 2008 gave him just 66.9 per cent support, the very same result which Joe Clark had deemed not sufficient to justify staying on as leader of the federal Progressive Conservatives in 1983. Bob Runciman served as interim parliamentary leader, but Tory retained the actual leadership of the party. Tory eventually resigned in 2009, after losing a by-election in Haliburton—Kawartha Lakes—Brock, and Runciman became the party's interim leader.

Bob Rae was named interim leader of the Liberal Party following the 2011 election, in which his party's previous leader, Michael Ignatieff, was defeated in his own riding.

Don Davies was named interim leader of the New Democratic Party following the 2025 election, in which his party's previous leader, Jagmeet Singh, was defeated in his own riding.

=== Internal disorganization ===
In one case, Ontario Liberal Party interim leader W.E.N. Sinclair led his party through two consecutive elections in 1926 and 1929. He was interim leader from 1923 to 1930 since, due to the party's state of disorganization, there was no leadership convention held in that period to choose a successor to Wellington Hay. When a convention was finally held, Sinclair drew little support and withdrew before balloting began. He was succeeded by future Premier Mitchell Hepburn.

After Martin Hattersley resigned as leader of the Social Credit Party of Canada in 1983 over the party executive's refusal to expel a group of holocaust deniers, Ken Sweigard was appointed as interim leader on what was anticipated to be a short-term basis until a new leadership convention could take place. Due to the rapid decline in the party's fortunes and membership in the early 1980s, no leadership convention took place until 1986, with Sweigard leading the party through the 1984 Canadian federal election.

=== Leader accepts another position ===
Sometimes an outgoing leader decides to resign immediately in order to ensure party unity, because they have accepted an appointment or chosen to stand as a candidate for (or been elected to) another position.

Following the resignation of Daniel Johnson as leader of the Quebec Liberal Party in 1998, the prospect of Jean Charest becoming the party's new leader began to attract widespread public support. When Charest subsequently decided to stand as a candidate, he resigned as leader of the federal Progressive Conservatives, and Elsie Wayne became the party's interim leader.

Similarly, Thomas Kennedy served as interim leader of the Progressive Conservative Party of Ontario from 1948 to 1949, after George Drew resigned to contest the leadership of the federal Progressive Conservatives.

=== Leave of absence ===
From November 1954 to February 1955 William Earl Rowe acted as interim Leader of the Opposition when Progressive Conservative leader George A. Drew was in poor health following an attack of meningitis. Drew returned but later fell ill again, and Rowe again became as interim leader of the opposition in August 1956. Drew resigned in September and Rowe became interim party and opposition leader until December, when John Diefenbaker was elected party leader.

An interim leader, Nycole Turmel was appointed to lead the NDP on July 28, 2011, while Jack Layton was on a medical leave of absence to fight cancer. She continued in the position following Layton's death on August 22, 2011.

=== Political circumstances ===
Following the 2008–2009 Canadian parliamentary dispute, Stéphane Dion's continued leadership of the federal Liberals was felt to be an impediment to the party's popular support, but with a situation where the party had to be almost immediately prepared to either take over the government or face an election, many party members felt that the party did not have the time to go through a conventional leadership race. After some internal debate, leadership candidates Dominic LeBlanc and Bob Rae withdrew from the race, and the only remaining candidate, Michael Ignatieff, was immediately named interim leader. His leadership was formally ratified at a party convention in May 2009.

When Dennis King stepped down as leader of the Progressive Conservative Party of Prince Edward Island in 2025, Rob Lantz became interim party leader. Later in the year, when it became clear that there was strong support for Lantz to permanently succeed King, he vacated his interim leader's position in order to enter the leadership election, with Bloyce Thompson in turn taking over as interim leader from Lantz until the latter's election as party leader.

When Kerry-Lynne Findlay stepped down as leader of the Conservative Party of British Columbia after party infighting in 2026, Lorne Doerkson became interim party leader. Two days after his selection as interim leader, the 2026 British Columbia general election was called, and Doerkson led the party into the election as its candidate for premier. The Conservatives would win the election, with Doerkson becoming premier.

=== Personal circumstances ===
Pam Barrett resigned the leadership of the Alberta New Democrats in 2000, but for health reasons she opted not to retain the leadership until her successor could be chosen, instead announcing that her resignation was effective immediately. Raj Pannu was named interim leader, and was then acclaimed leader at the subsequent convention. Brian Mason, who succeeded Pannu to the leadership in 2004, also took the position of interim leader before securing the full leadership at convention.

Danny Williams resigned the leadership of the Progressive Conservative Party of Newfoundland and Labrador, similarly choosing to step down immediately rather than serving until a leadership convention, and Deputy Premier Kathy Dunderdale was elevated to the interim leadership of the party and to the premiership.

== Federal interim party leaders ==
=== Conservative Party of Canada (historic) ===
- Hugh Guthrie October 11, 1926 – October 12, 1927 (following Arthur Meighen's loss of his seat in the general election and resignation)
- Richard Hanson May 14, 1940 – November 12, 1941 (following Robert James Manion's loss of his seat in the general election and resignation)

=== Progressive Conservative Party of Canada ===
- William Earl Rowe September 21, 1956 – December 14, 1956 (following George A. Drew's resignation)
- Erik Nielsen February 19, 1983 – June 11, 1983 (following Joe Clark's resignation)
- Jean Charest December 14, 1993 – April 29, 1995 (following Kim Campbell's loss of her seat in the general election and resignation and his own ratification as permanent leader)
- Elsie Wayne April 2, 1998 – November 14, 1998 (following Jean Charest's resignation to seek the leadership of the Quebec Liberal Party)

=== Canadian Alliance ===
- Deborah Grey March 27, 2000 – July 8, 2000 (following the creation of the party, until its first leadership convention)
- John Reynolds December 12, 2001 – March 20, 2002 (following the resignation of Stockwell Day)

=== Conservative Party of Canada ===
- John Lynch-Staunton December 8, 2003 – March 20, 2004 (following the creation of the party, until its first leadership convention)
- Rona Ambrose November 5, 2015 — May 27, 2017 (following the resignation of Stephen Harper after losing the 2015 federal election, until the election of Andrew Scheer as party leader)
- Candice Bergen February 2, 2022 — September 10, 2022 (following the removal as leader of Erin O'Toole, until the election of Pierre Poilievre as party leader)

=== Green Party of Canada ===
- Harry Garfinkle 1997 (following the abrupt resignation of Wendy Priesnitz over differences between the party's stated goals and the beliefs of its membership)
- Chris Bradshaw 2001 – February 2003 (following the resignation of Joan Russow)
- Jo-Ann Roberts November 4, 2019 – October 3, 2020 (following the resignation of Elizabeth May after the 2019 Canadian federal election)
- Amita Kuttner November 24, 2021 – November 19, 2022 (following the resignation of Annamie Paul after the 2021 Canadian federal election)

=== Liberal Party of Canada ===
- Daniel Duncan McKenzie February 17, 1919 – August 7, 1919 (following the death of Sir Wilfrid Laurier)
- Bill Graham March 19, 2006 – December 1, 2006 (following the resignation of Paul Martin after losing the 2006 federal election)
- Michael Ignatieff December 10, 2008 – May 2, 2009 (following the resignation of Stéphane Dion, until being elected permanent leader)
- Bob Rae May 25, 2011 – April 13, 2013 (following the resignation of Ignatieff who lost his seat in the 2011 federal election)

=== Co-operative Commonwealth Federation ===
- J. S. Woodsworth August 1, 1932 – July 1933 (acting leader from founding meeting until its first national convention a year later when he was elected permanent leader)

=== New Democratic Party ===
- Nycole Turmel July 28, 2011 – March 24, 2012 (following the death of Jack Layton)
- Don Davies May 5, 2025 – March 29, 2026 (following the resignation of Jagmeet Singh after losing his seat in the 2025 election)

=== Social Credit Party of Canada ===
- Alexander Bell Patterson March 9, 1967 – June 30, 1968 (following the defection of Robert N. Thompson to the Progressive Conservatives)
- Gilles Caouette June 29, 1977 – April 11, 1978 (following the death of André-Gilles Fortin)
- Charles-Arthur Gauthier April 11, 1978 – May 7, 1978, and February 23, 1979 – March 30, 1979 (following the resignations of Gilles Caouette and Lorne Reznowski respectively)
- Ken Sweigard July 15, 1983 – June 22, 1986 (following the resignation of Martin Hattersley)
- James Keegstra July 27, 1987 – July 30, 1987 (following Harvey Lainson's suspension from the party, until his reinstatement)

=== Bloc Québécois ===
- Gilles Duceppe January 16, 1996 – February 17, 1996 (following the resignation of Lucien Bouchard after losing the Quebec 1995 referendum)
- Vivian Barbot May 2, 2011 – December 11, 2011 (following the resignation of Gilles Duceppe after losing his seat in the 2011 Canadian federal election)
- Rhéal Fortin October 22, 2015 – March 18, 2017 (following the resignation of Gilles Duceppe after failing to win a seat in the 2015 Canadian federal election)
- Mario Beaulieu June 13, 2018 – January 17, 2019 (following the resignation of Martine Ouellet after losing a leadership review)

== Provincial and territorial interim party leaders ==
=== Alberta Social Credit Party ===
- Ernest Manning May 23, 1943 – May 31, 1943 (interim leader following the death of William Aberhart, until Manning's election as his permanent successor)
- James Douglas Henderson November 22, 1972 – February 4, 1973 (interim leader following the resignation of Harry Strom after the party lost the 1971 election)
- George Richardson 1982 – 1985 (interim leader after Raymond Speaker left to form the Representative Party of Alberta)
- Martin Hattersley 1985 – 1988 (interim leader after the resignation of George Richardson)

=== British Columbia Liberal Party ===
- Thomas Dufferin Pattullo October 1928 – January 1929 (following the resignation of John Duncan MacLean)
- Rich Coleman August 4, 2017 – February 3, 2018 (following the resignation of Christy Clark, after losing the 2017 provincial election)

=== British Columbia New Democratic Party ===
- Dan Miller August 25, 1999 – February 24, 2000 (served as interim party leader and Premier of British Columbia following the resignation of Glen Clark)
- Joy MacPhail May 16, 2001 – November 23, 2003 (following the resignation of Ujjal Dosanjh after the party lost the 2001 provincial election, with Dosanjh losing his seat)
- Dawn Black January 19, 2011 – April 17, 2011 (following the resignation of Carole James)
- Jennifer Whiteside October 29, 2026 – present (following the resignation of David Eby)

=== British Columbia Social Credit Party ===
- W. A. C. Bennett June 13, 1952 – July 15, 1952 (interim leader following the 1952 election, in which party leader Ernest George Hansell did not contest a seat, until Bennett's election as permanent leader)
- Jack Weisgerber March 7, 1992 – November 6, 1993 (following the resignation of Rita Johnston after the party lost the 1991 election, with Johnston losing her seat)

=== Coalition Avenir Québec ===
- Mathieu Lévesque October 18, 2026 – present (following the resignation of Christine Fréchette after the party lost the 2026 election, with Fréchette and all the party's other MNAs losing their seats)

=== Conservative Party of British Columbia ===
- Trevor Halford December 4, 2025 — May 30, 2026 (following John Rustad's removal as leader)
- Lorne Doerkson September 20, 2026 – present (following Kerry-Lynne Findlay's resignation)

=== Green Party of British Columbia ===
- Tom Hetherington 2000 (following the resignation of Stuart Parker for losing the leadership vote)
- Christopher Bennett 2007 (following the resignation of Adriane Carr)
- Adam Olsen 2013-2015 (following the resignation of Jane Sterk)
- Jeremy Valeriote January 28, 2025 — September 24, 2025 (following the resignation of Sonia Furstenau after losing her seat at the 2024 British Columbia general election)

=== Green Party of Prince Edward Island ===
- Darcie Lanthier 2012 (following the resignation of Sharon Labchuk)

=== Ontario Liberal Party ===
- John Fraser June 14, 2018 – March 7, 2020, August 3, 2022 – December 2, 2023, and January 29, 2025 – present (following the resignations of Kathleen Wynne, Steven Del Duca, and Bonnie Crombie respectively)

=== Quebec Liberal Party ===
- Gérard D. Levesque 15 November 1976 – April 15, 1978, and 1982 – October 15, 1983 (following the resignations of Robert Bourassa and Claude Ryan respectively)
- Monique Gagnon-Tremblay 2 March 1998 – 30 April 1998 (following the resignation of Daniel Johnson Jr.)
- Jean-Marc Fournier 19 December 2012 – 18 December 2013 (following the resignation of Jean Charest after the party lost the 2012 election, with Charest losing his seat)
- Pierre Arcand 5 October 2018 – 11 May 2020 (following the resignation of Philippe Couillard after the party lost the 2018 election)
- Marc Tanguay November 10, 2022 – June 19, 2025, and December 19, 2025 – February 13, 2026 (following the resignations of Dominique Anglade and Pablo Rodriguez respectively)

=== Prince Edward Island Liberal Party ===
- Lorne Bonnell 1965
- Bennett Campbell 1978 (following the retirement of Alexander B. Campbell, until his election as permanent leader)
- Gilbert Clements 1981 (following Bennett Campbell's resignation)
- Ron MacKinley 2000-2003 (MacKinley was the only member of the party elected in the 2000 provincial election)
- Robert Mitchell 2019 (following Wade MacLauchlan's resignation after losing his seat in the 2019 provincial election)
- Sonny Gallant September 16, 2019 - November 19, 2022 (following Robert Mitchell's resignation as interim leader)
- Hal Perry April 12, 2023 - October 5, 2025, and July 16, 2026 - October 25, 2026 (following the resignations of Sharon Cameron and Robert Mitchell respectively)

=== Progressive Conservative Association of Alberta ===
- Ernest Watkins 1959-1962 (following Cam Kirby's resignation after losing his seat at the 1959 election, in which Watkins was the only member of the party elected)
- Dave Hancock March 20, 2014 – September 6, 2014 (served as interim party leader and premier following the resignation of Alison Redford)
- Ric McIver May 11, 2015 – March 18, 2017 (following the resignation of Jim Prentice after the party lost the 2015 election)
- Richard Starke July 24, 2017 – March 19, 2019 (de facto interim leader after Jason Kenney and all the party's other MLAs left to join the United Conservative Party, until the Progressive Conservatives' dissolution following the 2019 election)

=== Progressive Conservative Party of New Brunswick ===
- Glen Savoie November 19, 2024 – October 17, 2026 (following Blaine Higgs' resignation after the party lost the 2024 election, with Higgs losing his seat)

=== Progressive Conservative Party of Prince Edward Island ===
- Rob Lantz February 21, 2025 – December 12, 2025 (interim party leader and premier following the resignation of Dennis King)
- Bloyce Thompson December 12, 2025 – February 7, 2026 (interim party leader and premier after Lantz resigned to seek the permanent leadership of the party)

=== Progressive Conservative Party of Ontario ===
- Thomas Laird Kennedy October 19, 1948 – May 4, 1949 (served as interim party leader and Premier of Ontario after George A. Drew resigned to become leader of the federal Progressive Conservative Party)
- Andy Brandt November 3, 1987 – May 12, 1990 (following Larry Grossman's resignation after losing his seat in the 1987 provincial election)
- Bob Runciman March 20, 2009 – July 1, 2009 (following the resignation of John Tory after failing to win a seat in the Haliburton—Kawartha Lakes—Brock by-election)
- Jim Wilson July 2, 2014 – May 9, 2015 (following the resignation of Tim Hudak)
- Vic Fedeli January 26, 2018 – March 10, 2018 (following the resignation of Patrick Brown)

=== Progressive Conservative Party of Manitoba ===
- Kelvin Goertzen September 1, 2021 – October 30, 2021. (Served as Interim Leader and Premier of Manitoba following the resignation of Brian Pallister)
- Wayne Ewasko January 18, 2024 – April 26, 2025 (Following the resignation of Heather Stefanson as Leader of the Progressive Conservative Party and Leader of the official opposition)
- Konrad Narth September 29, 2026 – present (Following the resignation of Obby Khan)

=== Union Nationale ===
- Yves Prévost September 16, 1960 – January 11, 1961 (Following the resignation of Antonio Barrette after losing the 1960 election
- Antonio Talbot January 11, 1961 – September 23, 1961 (Took over as interim leader after Prévost's resignation from the role)
- Jean-Jacques Bertrand September 26, 1968 – June 21, 1969 (Interim party leader and Premier of Quebec following the death of Daniel Johnson, Sr., until Bertrand's election as his permanent successor)
- Maurice Bellemare April 2, 1974 – May 22, 1976 (Following the resignation of Gabriel Loubier after he and all the party's other MNAs lost their seats at the 1973 election)
- Michel Le Moignan March 4, 1980 – January 9, 1981 (Following the defection of Rodrigue Biron to the Parti Québécois)
- Michel Le Brun March 24, 1987 – June 19, 1989 (Following the resignation of Paul Poulin, until the party's dissolution)

=== United Conservative Party ===
- Nathan Cooper July 24, 2017 – October 30, 2017 (interim leader from the party's formation until the election of Jason Kenney as its first permanent leader)

== Interim parliamentary leaders ==
In certain circumstances, a party may also have an interim parliamentary leader who is not officially the party's leader, particularly when the party leader is not a sitting member of the legislature. Herb Gray served as parliamentary leader of the Liberals following the selection of Jean Chrétien as leader in 1990, until Chrétien could run in a by-election to enter the House of Commons. Similarly, Bob Runciman served as parliamentary leader of the Ontario Progressive Conservative Party following the 2007 election, in which party leader John Tory lost his seat in the legislature. He became the party's full interim leader in 2009 after Tory was defeated in an attempt to re-enter the Legislative Assembly in a by-election.

To date, there has been only one occasion when it has been necessary for the ruling party to name an interim parliamentary leader due to the Prime Minister not holding a seat, which occurred when William Lyon Mackenzie King lost his seat at the 1925 election. Ernest Lapointe was designated to act as the Liberals' parliamentary leader until King was able to return to parliament in a by-election (King also lost his seat at the 1945 election, but on that occasion a by-election was able to take place prior to the first sitting of the new parliament).

Bill Graham served as interim parliamentary leader of the Liberals in early 2006, while outgoing party leader Paul Martin was still sitting as an MP and retained the formal leadership of the party. After this situation created some media confusion over which man would lead the party into an election if one were to occur, Martin stepped down as party leader in March, and Graham assumed the full interim leadership until Stéphane Dion was selected as leader in December.

Louis Plamondon became interim parliamentary leader of the Bloc Québécois on June 2, 2011, at the beginning of the first session of the 41st Canadian Parliament, following the 2011 federal election and the defeat and resignation of BQ leader Gilles Duceppe, while Vivian Barbot succeeded Duceppe as interim president of the BQ.

Major James Coldwell became parliamentary leader of the Co-operative Commonwealth Federation in October 1940, following the stroke and incapacitation of party leader J. S. Woodsworth, who retained the title of "honorary president" (leader). Coldwell was officially elected leader in July 1942, several months following Woodsworth's death. After Coldwell lost his seat in the 1958 federal election, Hazen Argue became the party's parliamentary leader, before being elected as party leader in 1960. The CCF's successors, the New Democratic Party would twice name David Lewis as interim parliamentary leader on two occasions after the party's inaugural leader, Tommy Douglas failed to win a seat in parliament in 1962 and 1968 respectively. After Lewis lost his own seat at the 1974 election, Ed Broadbent became parliamentary leader of the party until his election as permanent leader the following year.
