= André Fortin =

André Fortin may refer to:

- André Fortin (mathematician), Canadian mathematician
- André Fortin (politician), current member of the National Assembly of Quebec
- André-Gilles Fortin, Canadian member of parliament in the 1970s
- Dédé Fortin, musician associated with the rock band Les Colocs
- André Fortin, Canadian actor, known for Out to Sea
