= 1963 Social Credit Party of Canada split =

In 1963, the Quebec wing of the Social Credit Party of Canada split from the national party as the Ralliement des créditistes. The split had its roots in a long-standing dispute between the de facto leader of the Ralliement, Réal Caouette, and the party's national leader, Robert N. Thompson. At the party's 1960 leadership convention, held two years after the party lost all of its seats in the House of Commons of Canada, Thompson defeated Caouette for the leadership. The party returned to Parliament in the 1962 federal election, but 26 of its 30 MPs came from Quebec. Under the circumstances, Thompson was all but forced to name Caouette as deputy leader of the party. The relationship was strained, however, and the strain was exacerbated when the party failed to make any gains in its old heartland of the Prairies in the 1963 federal election. Only Thompson and three others were elected outside of Quebec, while 26 Socreds were elected in Quebec. The two factions of the party were not re-united until October 1971.

== Major events ==
=== Rise of the Social Credit Quebec wing ===
The Social Credit Party had been represented in Parliament in one form or another from 1935 until the 1958 election, when the Progressive Conservatives under John Diefenbaker won the biggest majority government in Canadian history. All 19 Socred MPs lost their seats.

Caouette, a social credit adherent since 1939, did much to build a strong base for the movement in Quebec while it was out of Parliament, including founding the Ralliement des créditistes du Canada as the party's Quebec branch. By 1961, his following had grown to the point that he felt he should succeed Solon Earl Low as party leader. At the ensuing leadership convention, Caouette lost to Thompson, who had the support of the leader of the party's most powerful branch, Alberta Premier Ernest Manning.

When the party returned to Parliament Hill in the 1962 election, its dynamics were greatly altered. Of the 30 Social Credit MPs, only four — including Thompson — came from the party's traditional heartland in western Canada. The other 26 came from Quebec, including Caouette. More or less by default, Caouette became the party's deputy leader.

=== 1963 Election ===
Thompson and Caouette never got along very well, and their relationship became even chillier after the 1963 election. The party held onto all of its seats in Quebec, but lost all but four seats in English Canada, leaving them with a total of 24 seats.

=== Leadership division ===
The Quebec créditistes considered Caouette, not Thompson, to be their true leader. Eventually, Caouette came to believe that since the party was strongest in Quebec nationally, he should be its leader. However, Thompson refused to give way.

Matters came to a head at the annual meeting of the Quebec wing of the party in Granby, Quebec, held on 1 September 1963. The 600 delegates in attendance voted to establish a new party. The vote was held after virtually no discussion by a show of hands. Approximately three-quarters of the delegates supported the motion to:

1. no longer recognize Thompson as party leader; and
2. ask the party's Quebec Members of Parliament (MPs) to name a parliamentary leader until a leadership convention could be held.

The convention also voted to appoint a ten-member committee to consider forming an affiliated party to contest provincial elections.

After the vote, 16 of the party's 25 Quebec MPs met to consider approval of the motion. Ten of the MPs approved it immediately, while six deferred approval pending discussions with their constituents. Gerard Chapdelaine (Sherbrooke), Henri Latulippe (Compton—Frontenac) and Charles-Eugene Dionne (Kamouraska) did not attend the meeting. Dr. Guy Marcoux, who had been elected as a Social Credit MP in Quebec—Montmorency in 1963, had left the Socred caucus to sit as an “independent Social Credit” MP.

Caouette then gave a 55-minute speech to the convention saying that the results were the basis for forming an “efficient national Social Credit movement”.

On the Saturday of the convention, Caouette had given a 90-minute speech in which he described Thompson as a “marionette” for Manning. He also dropped a bombshell: he claimed that in 1960, ten minutes before the leadership vote, Manning had instructed him to “tell your people to vote for Thompson because the West will never accept a Roman Catholic French Canadian leader”.

Thompson's response to the split in his party was limited at first: “Quebec doesn’t quite run me yet, nor the country.” The following day, he said that the Social Credit Party would now have wider acceptance throughout Canada than it had before because of Caouette's departure.

=== Departing MPs ===
On 2 September 1963, seven Quebec MPs announced that they would be supporting Caouette's breakaway faction: Maurice Coté (Chicoutimi), Jean-Louis Frenette (Portneuf), Chapdelaine, Gérard Ouellet (Rimouski), Marcel Lessard (Lac-Saint-Jean) and Gérard Girouard (Labelle). Marcoux rejoined the Social Credit Party and announced his loyalty to Thompson. Marcoux had never stated his reasons for quitting the party, but said that the reasons had now been removed. This left the Thompson faction with 11 MPs, the Caouette faction with ten, and three MPs who had not announced. The Ralliement's riding executive in Marcoux's Quebec—Montmorency riding called for his resignation, saying that he had "betrayed us, has lost our confidence forever, and for the last time we ask him to resign."

The Thompson loyalists said that they had been elected to work in the interests of party policies throughout the country under Thompson's leadership, and that that mandate would remain intact until the next election. Further, they said that the positions of party leader and deputy leader could only be determined by a national convention. They announced that they would establish a new branch of the National Social Credit Association in Quebec to replace Caouette's Ralliement des créditistes, which had been serving in that role. They also said that they expected that they would be expelled from the Ralliement.

Caouette met with 14 Quebec Social Credit MPs on 2 September 1963 to start work on creating the new party, saying, “Eventually we will attempt to make this a national party and take it across Canada to protect French Canadians in every province.” His faction now included Charles-Arthur Gauthier (Roberval), Gilles Grégoire (Lapointe), Gérard Perron (Beauce), Gilbert Rondeau (Shefford), Pierre-André Boutin (Dorchester), Jean Robert Beaulé (Quebec Est), Louis-Philippe-Antoine Bélanger (Charlevoix), Raymond Langlois (Mégantic), in addition to Latulippe and Dionne. Caouette was elected parliamentary leader and Grégoire was elected House Leader.

Caouette again called for a new national convention of the Social Credit Party of Canada to choose a new leader, and announced that the Thompson loyalists in the Quebec caucus would not be expelled from the Ralliement des creditistes. Caouette said that Thompson did not care about the French Canadian view of politics, and was afraid of embracing social credit doctrine, for which there was more support in Quebec than in the rest of Canada.

On 10 September 1963, Lucien Plourde, MP for Quebec West, declared his support for Caouette, bringing the Ralliement caucus to 13.

=== Results ===
The Thompson faction had been reduced to 11 MPs, one less than the minimum for a party to be a recognized group in the Commons, which meant that Caouette—and not Thompson—would receive an extra $4,000 per year in compensation (worth about $40,400 in 2025 dollars), and be given priority in speaking in the House. As a measure of how much the party's dynamics had changed, only seven of the Social Credit Party's remaining 11 MPs were from Quebec.

== Legacy ==
=== Additional floor-crossings ===
On April 23, 1964 two further Social Credit MPs, Gérard Ouellet and Gérard Girouard, left the Social Credit party to sit as Progressive Conservatives.

=== 1965 election ===
Thompson's Social Credit Party continued to stagnate, electing only five MPs to the House of Commons in the 1965 federal election — one up from the 1962 and 1963 performance in English Canada. W. A. C. Bennett, leader of the party's second-most powerful provincial branch and premier of British Columbia, cut off his party's financial and organizational support to the federal party in order to pressure the national Social Credit Party to reconcile with Caouette's wing. Meanwhile, the Alberta wing also failed to give its federal counterpart material and organizational support. Manning was concerned at the leftward drift of Canadian politics and urged Thompson to negotiate a merger between Social Credit and Robert Stanfield's Progressive Conservatives. Thompson attempted this but was unsuccessful.

=== Social Credit collapse ===
Facing the loss of their seats, in 1967, Bud Olson crossed the floor to join the Liberals. The next year, Thompson himself joined the Tories with the open support of both Manning and Stanfield. The three remaining Social Credit MPs lost their seats in the 1968 federal election.

=== Reunification ===
The 1968 federal election left Caouette's party as the sole representative of the Canadian social credit movement in the House of Commons. This cleared the way for the two parties to reunite at the 1971 Social Credit convention. Caouette was elected as the reunified party's leader, but the party's dynamics had been permanently altered. It would never win another seat in English Canada, and went into headlong decline after Caouette's death in 1976. The party lost its five remaining seats in 1980, never to return.

== Reaction in the rest of Canada ==
W. A. C. Bennett, the Socred Premier of British Columbia, had supported Caouette's bid for the leadership of the national party in 1960. However, following the split, Bennett declared his support for Thompson, albeit in a less than convincing way: “I am for making unity, not disunity. What’s-his-name [Thompson] was elected national leader at the national convention and he is the national leader.”

The rejection of Thompson's leadership by the Quebec wing of the party was supported by a group of rebels in the Ontario Social Credit Association called “Social Credit Action”. This group had split from the Ontario wing of the party over its refusal to campaign aggressively in provincial elections. Social Credit Action, led by James Audy, the party's former candidate in Spadina riding, and by David Hartman, of Toronto, announced its support for Caouette. Audy blamed the split on Thompson, saying that he only wanted to keep power for Manning. While Audy was announced by Caouette as leader of the Ralliement's Ontario wing, he did not run in the 1965 federal election. In that election, Caouette's party only ran two candidates outside of Quebec, Raymond Berthiaume in the Glengarry—Prescott in Ontario and Joseph-Hurgel Dubé in Restigouche—Madawaska in New Brunswick, both ridings with large francophone populations. In the 1968 federal election, the Ralliement again stood a candidate in Restigouche but nowhere else outside of Quebec.

== A separatist element? ==
There is evidence that support for the split came, in part, from a Quebec separatist element in the party. Yvan Piche, chief organizer of the Parti républicain, a separatist party led by Marcel Chaput, attended the annual meeting of the Quebec wing as an observer, and was seen talking to groups of young delegates.

For his part, Caouette walked a thin line between federalism and separatism. He made no secret of his strong nationalist views, but maintained that he wanted to work within the spirit and letter of Confederation: “Let us not burn our bridges. It is not the time for le Ralliement des créditistes to be separatists, but rather to win recognition for the French fact within Canada.” Caouette said that he would fight for the recognition of French Canada's aspirations within Confederation on the basis of a partnership with the other nine provinces, “But if this partnership cannot be brought about, I shall become the more ardent separatist in Quebec.”

== See also ==
- Social Credit
- Social Credit Party of Canada
- Ralliement des créditistes
- Canadian social credit movement
