= Independent candidates in the 1995 Ontario provincial election =

Several independent candidates sought election to the Legislative Assembly of Ontario in the 1995 Ontario provincial election. One such candidate, Peter North, was elected to the legislature. Information on these candidates may be found on this page.

It is possible that some of these candidates were members of unregistered political parties.

Independent candidates who took part in provincial by-elections between 1995 and 1999 are also listed on this page.

== Candidates ==
=== Downsview: Donato De Dominicis ===
De Dominicis was a fifty-four-year-old business owner. He called for job incentives for youth and safer neighbourhoods. He received 572 votes (2.47%), finishing fourth against Liberal candidate Annamarie Castrilli.

=== Muskoka–Georgian Bay: Bill Ogilvie ===
William J. Ogilvie has been a political activist in Simcoe County for many years. He served on the Midland council in the 1970s and was at one time its deputy reeve. He lost a mayoralty contest to Moreland Lynn in 1978 and later accused Lynn of being in a conflict of interest over the awarding of an office furniture tender. His complaint was taken up by the provincial government, which had the Ministry of Intergovernmental Affairs investigate the matter. Charges were laid but later dismissed.

Ogilvie ran unsuccessfully for municipal office in 1982 on an environmental platform, opposing crop dusting and drawing attention to contamination in Georgian Bay. He was a member of the Tiny Township Ratepayers' Association in this period, and made several submissions before the Midland council. In 1983, he criticized the council for putting a time limit on speeches and for requiring submissions to be made in advance. On May 4, 1983, Ogilvie bought an advertisement in the Midland Free Press that accused members of a prominent local law firm of failing to represent the interests of their client, Tiny Township, in an annexation bid by Midland. The paper later apologized, but was successfully sued by the firm for libel.

Ogilvie ran for the Tiny Township council in 1985. In the late 1980s, he criticized three different councils in Simcoe County for holding meetings in camera. He was dragged from Midland council chambers on April 17, 1990, after accusing the councillors of acting like Nazis.

Ogilvie ran for mayor of Midland again in 1994 and lost to George MacDonald. He ran for the Legislative Assembly of Ontario in the 1995 provincial election and placed fifth against Progressive Conservative candidate Bill Grimmett. He later ran for the Penetanguishene municipal council in 2000, and for mayor of the same community in 2003. On the former occasion, he argued against the sale of Canada's water resources and called for the town's weekly water test results to be made available to the public.

Ogilvie wrote a letter supporting Cuba's public health system in 2008, and called for Canada to end private sector involvement in health care. He has also written in support of recall elections and the abolition of the monarchy and against Canada's military involvement in Afghanistan.

Electoral record (partial)
Election	Division	Party	Votes	%	Place	Winner
Midland municipal election, 1978	Mayor	n/a			def.	Moreland Lynn
Midland municipal election, 1994	Mayor	n/a			def.	George MacDonald
1995 provincial	Muskoka–Georgian Bay	Independent	381	1.10	5/5	Bill Grimmett
Penetanguishene municipal election, 2003	Mayor	n/a	851	32.98	2/2	Anita Dubeau

=== St. George—St. David: Linda Gibbons ===
Linda Dale Gibbons, born in Whitehorse, Yukon, is a veteran anti-abortion protester in Canada. She has sought election to the House of Commons of Canada and the Legislative Assembly of Ontario and has served time in jail for taking part in illegal protests next to the entrances to abortion clinics. She has acknowledged that she herself had an abortion in 1970, at age twenty-three. She later became a Christian, and in 1996 she described the aborted fetus as a murder victim.

In private life, Gibbons has worked as a clerk and as a swimming instructor for disabled children. In the early 1990s, she worked at an anti-abortion pregnancy centre. She was educated at a community college and later attended York University, although she left its social work program for ideological reasons.

Gibbons was profiled in a 1996 Toronto Star article, which described her as having spent thirty-two months in jail since 1989 for taking part in illegal protests. The article noted that she had obstructed police and disobeyed court orders, and that she sometimes carried a plastic replica of a human fetus outside abortion clinics. A 1997 article in The Globe and Mail noted that Gibbons would usually resume her illegal protests within days of being released, leading each time to another arrest and conviction. Gibbons has described herself as a political prisoner and has described abortion as "a crisis as much as black slavery was."

She ran in the 1993 federal election as a candidate of Ken Campbell's Christian Freedom Party of Canada, which did not field enough candidates to receive official party status. She was in prison at the time of the election; an advertisement in the Toronto Star newspaper paid for by Campbell described her as a prisoner of conscience. In 1995, she ran as an independent. In 2014, Gibbons is running in the Ontario riding of Trinity-Spadina in a federal byelection, though under her present legal name of Linda Groce.

A June 2010 article in the National Post described Gibbons as once again awaiting trial for protesting outside an abortion centre in violation of an injunction.

Electoral record (partial)
Election	Division	Party	Votes	%	Place	Winner
1993 federal	N/A (Christian Freedom)	Rosedale	214	0.39	8/10	Bill Graham, Liberal
1995 provincial	Independent	St. George—St. David	326	1.04	4/7	Al Leach, Progressive Conservative
2014 federal by-election	N/A (Christian Heritage)	Trinity-Spadina				

=== Windsor—Sandwich: Christine Wilson ===
Wilson is a longtime anti-poverty activist in Windsor. She challenged as an independent from the left in the 1995 election.

Her early life was marked by tragedy and she was forced onto the streets for survival. She was able to attend St. Clair College at age sixteen after a welfare administrator waved the standard age requirements (Windsor Star, 30 March 2001). Wilson first gained local prominence after singing at a 1994 anti-poverty rally in Windsor (Windsor Star, 3 December 1994).

Wilson was 38 years old at the time of the provincial election. She was also active in Windsor Coalition Against Poverty and the Ontario Coalition for Social Justice. She opposed cuts to welfare payments, and argued that the city's casino revenues should be used to improve the city's bus system. Wilson was quoted as saying, "I believe as an independent we are free to vote as people ask us to vote. Parties constrict the way we (MPs) vote and as an independent I can't be quieted by a party". (Windsor Star, 8 May 1995)

She received 410 votes (1.62%), finishing fifth against Liberal candidate Sandra Pupatello.

Wilson spoke out against the province's decision to lift rent controls in 1996, referring to the decision as a "moral crime" (Windsor Star, 7 September 1996). She became the administrator of Windsor Essex Low Income Families Together (WELIFT) (Windsor Star, 24 August 1998). In 1999 she started the Street Help / Unit 7 homeless outreach program. In recent years, Street Help has suffered financial difficulties (Windsor Star, 22 December 2004).

Wilson campaigned for the Windsor City Council in 2000, and finished fifth in Ward Three with 1,361 votes.

In June 2014 Street Help/Unit 7 homeless program was incorporated as a Canadian Charity under the name Street Help Homeless Centre Of Windsor.

Christine continues as the volunteer Administrator. She married Ernest Barry Furlonger on August 6, 2008 and now goes by the name Christine Wilson-Furlonger. Christine's husband works alongside her as a volunteer fundraiser for the agency.

== post-election ==
=== York South by-election, May 23, 1996: David Milne ===
Milne is not to be confused with the famous artist David Milne, nor with a Canadian professor of the same name. It is not clear what ideology or cause Milne represented. He received 151 votes (0.76%), finishing fourth against Liberal candidate Gerard Kennedy.
