= David Milne =

David Milne may refer to:

- Sir David Milne (Royal Navy officer) (1763–1845), British admiral
- David Milne (archer) (born 1939), Zimbabwean Olympic archer
- David Milne (artist) (1882–1953), Canadian artist
- Sir David Milne (civil servant) (1896–1972), Permanent Under-Secretary of State for Scotland
- David Milne (rugby league) (born 1986), Australian rugby league player
- David Milne (rugby union) (1958–2025), Scottish international rugby union player
- David Milne (Ontario politician)
- David Milne-Home (1805–1890), Scottish advocate and geologist, born David Milne (adopted the name Home upon marriage)
