= Christian Freedom Party of Canada =

Unregistered Canadian political party

The Christian Freedom Party of Canada, also known as the Christian Freedom/Social Credit Party of Canada, was an unregistered Canadian political party that was active from 1988 to 1996. It grew out of the Social Credit Party of Canada and for most of its existence was registered under the Social Credit name.

== Origins ==
In 1986, the Rev. Harvey Lainson defeated Holocaust denier Jim Keegstra to become leader of Canada's moribund Social Credit Party. Although Lainson ran on a right-wing platform, he was not associated with Keegstra's ideology.

After becoming Social Credit leader, Lainson rebranded the party as the Christian Freedom Party of Canada. According to its official literature, the party was centred on three principles: "God is creator of the universe," "the Bible is the Word of God," and "Jesus Christ is Lord." It also described the human individual as "the most important of all God's creations," and opposed any system of government that was considered to favour the rights of the state over the rights of the individual.

When evangelist Ken Campbell became leader of the Social Credit Party in 1990, he continued to describe it as the Christian Freedom Party in public addresses. For tax purposes, it was still called the Social Credit Party on official party documents.

== Political activities in the 1990s ==
Campbell announced in 1992 that he would run as a Christian Freedom candidate in the next federal election, but that he had no intention of winning and simply wanted a platform to express his religious convictions. He added that he would encourage voters to support the Reform Party because of its populist leanings. (Campbell had done the same thing in the 1991 Toronto mayoral election, when he entered the campaign to encourage voters to support June Rowlands.) He clarified that his support for Reform was intended as a temporary alliance, and that he would withdraw his support if and when the party abandoned its original goals.

As leader of the Christian Freedom Party, Campbell supported traditional social credit economic theory and called for a cap on borrowing charges applied by banks. He also promoted an anti-abortion message.

== Electoral history ==
In May 1993, the Government of Canada approved changes to the Canada Elections Act requiring that political parties field at least fifty candidates in general elections to be registered with Elections Canada. Existing parties unable to meet this requirement were to be deregistered and have their assets liquidated. Campbell strongly opposed this legislation and, somewhat improbably, supported the Communist Party of Canada in its bid for an injunction until after the next election. In a letter to Communist leader Miguel Figueroa, he wrote, "While we are obviously poles apart philosophically...we support your democratic right to exercise that freedom of speech and of association." The injunction was not granted, however, and the provisions of the legislation remained in place.

Campbell tried to field fifty Christian Freedom candidates in the 1993 federal election, which would have permitted him to officially launch the party under its new name. The party was only able to field around ten candidates, however, and it was deregistered by Elections Canada in October 1993. As a result, its candidates appeared on the ballot as non-affiliated.

Campbell ran in Oakville—Milton while anti-abortion protester Linda Gibbons ran for the party in Rosedale. Both identified as Christian Freedom candidates and Campbell also identified as a Social Credit candidate. Douglas Stelpstra and Jim Brink had registered as Social Credit candidates in Brant and Hamilton East before the party was deregistered; Brink described himself as an independent during the campaign and does not seem to have used the Christian Freedom name. It is not clear who the other candidates were. A registered organization called the Canada Party fielded several candidates on a social credit platform in 1993, but it was not aligned with Campbell's group.

Campbell later ran in a 1996 by-election in Hamilton East, still identifying as the Christian Freedom Party leader although he appeared on the ballot as an independent. The party was not involved in electoral activities after this time. Campbell retained ownership of the Social Credit Party name until his death, but he did not use it for electoral purposes after 1993.
