= Renaissance Canada =

Renaissance Canada was a conservative lobby group founded in 1974 by Christian activist Ken Campbell to promote "parent power" in education. It is known for its involvement in its attempt to remove from school curricula works such as novels of Margaret Laurence and for its public condemnations of Martin Scorsese's The Last Temptation of Christ.
