= Martin Hattersley =

Canadian lawyer and activist (1932–2020)

Leader of the Social Credit Party of Canada
- In office November 1980 – June 1983
- Preceded by: Fabien Roy
- Succeeded by: Ken Sweigard

Personal details
- Born: November 10, 1932 Swinton, Yorkshire, England
- Died: June 7, 2020 (aged 87) Edmonton, Alberta, Canada
- Profession: Lawyer

J. Martin Hattersley (November 10, 1932 – June 7, 2020) was a Canadian lawyer and long-time activist of the Canadian social credit movement. Born in Swinton, near Rotherham, Yorkshire, England, Hattersley earned degrees in economics and law from Cambridge University before moving to Alberta in 1956 where he worked as a lawyer. His parents met at a social credit conference in Britain.

From 1962 to 1964, he was director of research of the Social Credit Association of Canada, and personal secretary and speechwriter to Social Credit Party of Canada leader Robert N. Thompson, MP.

Hattersley served as national president of the party in the mid-1970s and ran for the party's leadership following the death of Réal Caouette in 1976, placing third. He ran again in 1978 when he was defeated by Lorne Reznowski at the party's national leadership convention by a margin of 356 votes to 115. Hattersley had campaigned on a platform of broadening the party's base and appealing to a wider spectrum of voters but was unable to overcome Reznowski's more doctrinaire approach advocating social credit monetary theory.

After the party's remaining five Members of Parliament were defeated in the 1980 general election, he became leader of the party from 1981 to 1983. He resigned after the party voted to reinstatate Jim Keegstra and two others after Hattersley suspended their memberships and tried to expel them because of their antisemitic activism, saying "I simply cannot be leader of a party that has people accepted into its ranks that publicly express views of that sort." Hattersley later claimed that Social Credit's association with "that sort of approach ... prevents other people from taking it seriously."

He was also interim leader of the Social Credit Party of Alberta from 1985 to 1988, in the wake of the party's loss of its only remaining seats in the Alberta legislature and was president emeritus afterwards. As leader he led an attempt to merge several Alberta parties into the Alberta Political Alliance, which proved to be a short-lived coalition of Social Credit, the Western Canada Concept and the Heritage Party, in 1986 but neither the Alliance nor Social Credit were prepared to run candidates in the 1986 Alberta election.

In August 1988, the body of Hattersley's 29-year-old daughter, Cathy Greeve, was found in the bathroom at an Edmonton Transit station. She had been robbed and strangled to death. Ronald Nienhuis, on day parole while serving time for armed robbery, was charged and convicted of the crime.

After his daughter's murder, Hattersley was involved in an Edmonton victim's support group and spoke in prisons on alternatives to violence. He spoke out in favour of prisoners' right to vote, telling the Edmonton Journal that "[b]eing allowed to vote means you are being treated as a human being and a citizen and that's good from a psychological point of view." He was given the Queen's Jubilee medal for his work in the victim's support group. Over the course of his life he served as a Lay Reader and choir director at a number of Anglican churches in Edmonton and Ottawa, and in 1974, was ordained as a 'priest in secular employment'.

He died in Edmonton, Alberta, on June 7, 2020.
