= Social Credit Party of Canada leadership elections =

The Canadian social credit movement first contested the 1935 federal election in order to capitalize from the Alberta Social Credit League's surprise victory in Alberta's August 1935 provincial election. Social Credit supporters ran as the Western Social Credit League and John Horne Blackmore was appointed the movement's parliamentary leader following the election although Alberta Premier William Aberhart was generally regarded as the unofficial national leader of the movement.

Aberhart and the Social Credit movement supported William Duncan Herridge as leader of the national New Democracy movement for the 1940 election – Herridge failed to win a seat in Parliament, however, and Blackmore remained leader of the group in parliament. In 1944, at its first national convention, the Social Credit Association of Canada was formed and elected its first official national leader.

== 1944 founding convention ==
The convention was held at the Royal York Hotel in Toronto. The party leader was elected on April 6, 1944.

First Ballot

- Solon Earl Low acclaimed

Early in the convention MPs John Horne Blackmore, Victor Quelch and Rev. Ernest George Hansell were all reported to be possible contenders for the party leadership. However, only Alberta Provincial Treasurer Solon Low and Major Andrew Henry Jukes, the leader of the British Columbia Social Credit League since 1937, were nominated for the leadership. Jukes withdrew before the vote was held and Low was acclaimed.

== 1961 leadership convention ==
The convention was held in the Cow Palace in Ottawa, Ontario, July 4 to 7, 1961

First Ballot

- Robert N. Thompson
- Réal Caouette
- George Hahn

Alexander Bell Patterson was also a candidate but withdrew before the first ballot.

Thompson, a chiropractor by profession, was the party's president and was a founding member of the Alberta party before moving to Africa to help re-establish the Ethiopian Air Force. Thompson was a protégé of Alberta Premier Ernest Manning. Caouette was a car salesman by trade and an MP for the Social Credit affiliated Union des electeurs in the 1940s. He founded Social Credit's Quebec wing, Ralliement des créditistes in the late 1950s and was its president. He was supported by British Columbia Premier W.A.C. Bennett. Hahn was a former Social Credit MP from British Columbia who had lost his seat in the 1958 federal election.

The actual count was not revealed and the ballots were burned. Officials would only tell reporters that Thompson had won by a "very close" margin over runner up Caouette. Caouette was chosen deputy leader. The secrecy surrounding the election subsequently fuelled rumours, voiced by Caouette himself, that Caouette would have won if not for the opposition of Alberta Premier Ernest Manning, who was unwilling to have a Quebecer and Catholic lead the national party. When the 1962 and 1963 federal elections resulted in a breakthrough in Quebec under Caouette and Social Credit caucuses that were overwhelmingly made up of Quebec MPs, the party divided with Caouette's Ralliement des créditistes becoming a separate party and Thompson leading a Social Credit rump. The split would not be healed until the 1970s by which time Social Credit had been wiped out on the federal level in English Canada and its five remaining English Canadian MPs had either been defeated or crossed the floor to join other parties – including Thompson who joined the Progressive Conservatives prior to the 1968 election after his attempt to negotiate a merger between Social Credit and the Tories failed. Patterson became acting leader of the remaining three man caucus and led it into the 1968 federal election in which the remaining English Canadian Social Credit MPs were wiped out leaving Caouette's party as the sole representative of the Social Credit movement in parliament.

== 1971 leadership convention ==
The convention was held in Hull, Quebec on October 9, 1971.

- Réal Caouette 510 (73.7%)
- Phil Cossette 104 (15.0%)
- James McGillivray 69 (10.0%)
- Fernand Bouret 9 (1.3%)

At this convention the Social Credit Party of Canada and the Caouette-led Ralliement créditiste were reunited – healing a split that had occurred in 1963.

Réal Caouette, the only MP from the 15-member caucus in the contest, won the leadership on the first ballot over Phil Cossette, an advertising businessman from Cap-de-la-Madeleine, Quebec, Dr. James McGillivray, a surgeon from Collingwood, Ontario, and Fernand Bourret, the party’s director of policy research and a former journalist. Cossette attracted younger delegates, and proposed recognizing the principle of self-determination for all provinces, and creating parallel civil services and government administrations in English and French. McGillivray spoke to the convention on social credit economics, and claimed that using social credit to wipe out poverty would eliminate socialism in Canada.

The convention attracted 979 delegates of which 655 (70%) were from Quebec, 149 from Ontario, 121 from Western Canada, 51 from the Atlantic provinces, and three from the United States.

== 1976 leadership convention ==
The convention was held at the Ottawa Civic Centre on November 7, 1976.

First ballot:

- André-Gilles Fortin 532 (46.54%)
- René Matte 317 (27.73%)
- Martin Hattersley 194 (16.97%)
- Ralph Cameron 48 (4.2%)
- John H. Long 31 (2.71%)
- Philip Hele-Hambly 18 (1.58%)
- Alex Barker 3 (0.26%)

Barker was eliminated after the first ballot. Philip Hele-Hambly and John H. Long both withdrew before the second ballot. Another announced candidate, Patricia Métivier, a Montreal journalist and perennial candidate, was denied accreditation to the convention.

Second ballot:

- André-Gilles Fortin 610 (55.35%)
- René Matte 317 (28.77%)
- Martin Hattersley 165 (14.97%)
- Ralph Cameron 10 (0.91%)

André-Gilles Fortin, the 32-year-old MP for Lotbiniere won the convention on the second ballot. Fortin presented a young, dynamic image, but campaigned on traditional social credit economic theory and supporting small business. The other candidates were:

- René Matte, MP for Champlain, who proposed splitting Canada into five sovereign regions within a loose confederation, and complained that the party executive had changed the rules for accrediting delegates to favour Fortin, leading to the disqualification of 150 party members, and the accreditation of extra delegates from some ridings;
- Martin Hattersley of Edmonton, Alberta, the party’s national president;
- Alex Barker, a contractor from Saskatoon, Saskatchewan;
- Ralph Cameron, a contractor from Calgary, Alberta;
- Philp Hele-Hambly, a teacher from Montreal, Quebec;
- John R. Long, a manufacturer from Cambridge, Ontario:

Fortin was killed in an automobile accident the next year.

== 1978 leadership convention ==
The convention was held in Winnipeg, May 6–7, 1978.

- Lorne Reznowski 356 (75.58%)
- Martin Hattersley 115 (24.42%)

Reznowski was an English Professor at the University of Manitoba and a former national secretary of the party and aide to former leader Robert N. Thompson. Hattersley, an Edmonton lawyer, was the party's president, former director of research of the Social Credit Association of Canada and was also a former aide to and speechwriter for Thompson. Less doctrinaire than Reznowski on the issue of social credit economic theory, Hattersley argued in favour of broadening the party's base and appealing to a wider spectrum of voters. Former British Columbia cabinet minister Philip Gaglardi was also a candidate but dropped out days before the convention after his demands for $1 million and a jet plane to fight the next federal election were rejected. He supported Hattersley after withdrawing.

The convention was controversial because it was held in Winnipeg rather than in Quebec where most party members, and the entire parliamentary caucus, resided. Réal Caouette's son, Gilles Caouette, who had been expected to be a candidate for the leadership resigned as interim party leader in protest over the party executive's decision to hold the convention outside of Quebec and before the federal election which was expected in 1978 (Caouette would have preferred to remain interim leader and lead the party through the election before having to face a convention). It was believed that the party executive wished to have an English Canadian leader in hopes of reviving the party's prospects in Western Canada while Caouette and much of the caucus, fearing the loss of their seats in an election, preferred to have a Quebec leader in hopes of retaining the party's existing support in that province.

Reznowski resigned as leader five months after being elected to the position after winning only 2.76% of the vote in an October 1978 federal by-election in Saint Boniface, Manitoba.

Leaderless, the party appointed independent Quebec National Assembly member Fabien Roy as party leader in the middle of the 1979 federal election campaign. Roy was elected to parliament leading a six-member Social Credit caucus. He led the party through the 1980 federal election after the fall of Joe Clark's minority government. Every Social Credit MP was defeated. Seatless, Roy tried to re-enter parliament by running in a by-election in Frontenac on March 24, 1980 but he was defeated. He resigned the leadership on November 1, 1980. Martin Hattersley was appointed acting leader of the party in 1981.

== 1982 leadership convention ==
The convention was held on July 3, 1982 in Regina, Saskatchewan.

- Martin Hattersley
- Ken Sweigard
- Anne McBride
- Poldi Meindl

Hattersley won on the first ballot; vote totals were not released.

Hattersley was an Edmonton lawyer, former party president and the party's interim leader since Roy's resignation. Sweigard of Alberta and McBride of Ontario were evangelical ministers. Meindl, of Vancouver, was a local activist who had run as a Socred candidate in the 1980 federal election and was known in the city for having campaigned against homosexuality. At the convention he distributed hundreds of copies of the Canadian Bill of Rights, which he claimed was signed into law by Queen Elizabeth under duress and therefore was illegal. He ran as a candidate for the Confederation of Regions Party in 1984 and as an independent candidate in Burnaby—Kingsway against openly gay NDP MP Svend Robinson in 1988 and 1993.

Hattersley resigned as leader in 1983 after the executive overturned his decision to expel Holocaust denier Jim Keegstra and two other anti-Semites from the party. Sweigard, an evangelist, was appointed interim leader and led the party through the 1984 federal election in which it failed to win any seats.

== 1986 leadership convention ==
The convention was held on June 21, 1986 in Toronto.

- Harvey Lainson 67 (58.77%)
- Jim Keegstra 38 (33.33%)
- Ken Sweigard 9 (7.9%)

A fourth candidate, retired grocer James Green of Bentley, Alberta, dropped out before the first ballot to support Keegstra.

Sweigard, an evangelical minister, had been the party's acting leader since Hattersley's resignation in 1983 and led the party through the 1984 federal election in which it won only 16,659 votes with 51 candidates. Lainson, also an evangelical minister, was from Ontario. Keegstra, an Alberta car mechanic and former school teacher was best known for having been fired as a teacher and charged with hate speech for promoting hatred of Jews in the classroom. White supremacists Don Andrews and Robert Smith along with Holocaust denier Ernst Zündel were at the convention supporting Keegstra.

Lainson declared his victory a win for the party's moderates and Keegstra's supporters vowed to continue the fight. Green said of Lainson after his victory, "We're going to stonewall this guy. There's no way we're going to do business with him. As far as we're concerned, this bunch is part of the conspiracy."

The party executive ousted Lainson as leader in July 1987 after he attempted to abandon the Social Credit name in favour of "Christian Freedom". The executive appointed Keegstra as leader. Lainson did not recognize the meeting as legitimate and refused to relinquish the leadership.

After an internal fight Keegstra was expelled in September and the party was renamed the Christian Freedom Social Credit Party though its nine candidates ran under its old name in the 1988 federal election. Lainson resigned as the near-moribund party's leader in 1990 and evangelist Ken Campbell was appointed leader by the party's national executive on February 16, 1990. The party was de-registered by Elections Canada in 1993 when it failed to nominate at least 50 candidates in the federal election.
