= Ken Sweigard =

Canadian Pentecostal evangelist and politician

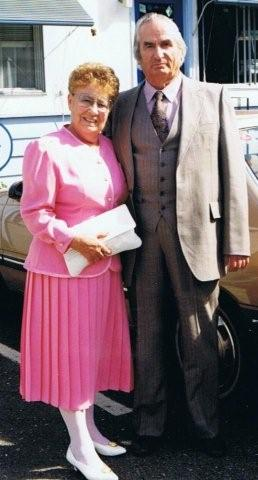
- Ken and Audrey Sweigard

Leader of the Social Credit Party of Canada
- In office 1983–1986
- Preceded by: Martin Hattersley
- Succeeded by: Harvey Lainson

Personal details
- Born: September 21, 1919
- Died: July 11, 2005 (aged 85) Grande Prairie, Alberta
- Occupation: Evangelist

Kenneth Sweigard (September 21, 1919 – July 11, 2005) was a Pentecostal evangelist from Grande Prairie, Alberta, and politician who led the Social Credit Party of Canada from 1983 to 1986.

In the 1980 election, Social Credit's five remaining Members of Parliament (all from Quebec) were defeated. The party had not had any MPs from its old base of Alberta and British Columbia since 1968.

Sweigard first ran as a Social Credit candidate in the 1980 federal election. Standing in Peace River, Alberta, he came in fifth place with 462 votes. He placed behind the three major parties and the candidate for the Rhinoceros Party of Canada candidate, Allan Cavanagh.

Sweigard first sought the party's leadership in 1982, when he lost to Martin Hattersley. Sweigard attended the party's leadership convention dressed as U.S. president Abraham Lincoln, wearing a top hat and carrying a walking stick. His entourage, dressed in 1860s style, held placards reading "Free the Slaves" and chanted "Free the economic slaves", a reference to the social credit theory of monetary reform and opposition to the charging of interest on borrowed money. Hattersley resigned as leader in June 1983 when the party would not expel three outspoken party members from Alberta, including Jim Keegstra who had been accused of antisemitism. Sweigard, who described Keegstra as a "fine Christian gentleman", was elected interim leader by means of a telephone conference call of 17 party members, with 9 votes to 5 votes for party vice-president Richard Lawrence and three for Adrien Lambert. As leader, he ran in the 1984 election in Timiskaming, placing last with 151 votes. Nationally, under his leadership, the party suffered what was its worst performance to date receiving only 16,659 votes nationwide.

Sweigard attempted to win the leadership on a permanent basis at the party's national convention in 1986 but fared poorly, despite telling delegates that he had been visited by an angel who had endorsed his candidacy. Sweigard received only 9 of 114 votes, finishing well behind winning candidate Harvey Lainson and runner-up Jim Keegstra.

After losing the leadership, he ran again in the 1988 election in Peace River, where he came in last in a field of six candidates with 354 votes. He died at Grande Prairie in 2005.
