= André Fortin (mathematician) =

- Born: 1956 (age 69–70)
- Education: Université Laval
- Awards: CAIMS-Fields Industrial Mathematics Prize
- Scientific career
- Fields: Numerical methods Partial differential equations
- Workplaces: Université Laval
- Thesis: Méthodes d'éléments finis pour les équations de Navier–Stokes (1984)
- Doctoral advisor: Michel Fortin
- Website: www.mat.ulaval.ca/departement-et-professeurs/direction-personnel-et-etudiants/professeurs/fiche-de-professeur/show/fortin-andre/

André Fortin (born 1956) is a French Canadian mathematician, known for his research in applied and industrial mathematics. He holds a NSERC Research Chair in High Performance Scientific Computing at Université Laval.

Fortin earned his Ph.D. from the Université Laval in 1984. His thesis advisor was Michel Fortin, a now emeritus professor of the Université Laval, recipient of Prix Summa in 1987 and prize CAIMS-SCMAI in 2005 and a member of the Royal Society of Canada in 1999.

== Career ==
He is the director of the Groupe Interdisciplinaire de Recherche en Éléments Finis (GIREF).

In addition to over 150 research papers on mathematics, he has written a student textbook on numerical analysis for engineers "Analyse numérique pour ingénieurs" in 1994. The textbook has been awarded the Prix Roberval in 1996.

Moreover, Fortin has received the CAIMS-Fields Industrial Mathematics Prize in 2012 in recognition of his exceptional contribution throughout his career to research in industrial mathematics.
