= Charles-Arthur Gauthier =

Canadian politician

- Official 1979 portrait

Leader of the Social Credit Party
- Acting
- In office February 23, 1979 – March 30, 1979
- Preceded by: Lorne Reznowski
- Succeeded by: Fabien Roy
- In office April 11, 1978 – May 7, 1978
- Preceded by: Gilles Caouette (acting)
- Succeeded by: Lorne Reznowski

Member of Parliament for Roberval
- In office June 18, 1962 – February 18, 1980
- Preceded by: Jean-Noël Tremblay
- Succeeded by: Suzanne Beauchamp-Niquet

Personal details
- Born: May 12, 1913 Mistassini, Quebec, Canada
- Died: May 12, 1997 (aged 84)
- Party: Independent
- Other political affiliations: Social Credit (1962–1963; 1971–1980); Ralliement créditiste (1963–1971)
- Occupation: Politician; Merchant; Furniture and appliances retailer

Charles-Arthur Gauthier (French pronunciation: [ʃaʁl aʁtyʁ ɡotje]; May 12, 1913 – May 12, 1997) was a Canadian undertaker and long-time politician. He was a member of Parliament (MP) for the Social Credit Party and Ralliement Créditiste. Gauthier was first elected to the House of Commons of Canada representing Roberval, Quebec, in the 1962 election. In 1963, he and numerous other Quebec Socred MPs joined Réal Caouette in forming the Ralliement Créditiste, a Quebec breakaway from the federal Social Credit Party that rejoined the federal party in 1971.

Gauthier was acting leader of the Social Credit Party following the resignation of Gilles Caouette in 1978 and again in 1979 following the resignation of Lorne Reznowski. Gauthier said he did not wish to lead the party into an election and Fabien Roy was drafted as leader. Gauthier retained his seat in the 1979 federal election but was defeated in the 1980 election that wiped out the party.
