= Tom Hetherington =

English footballer

Personal information
- Full name: Thomas Burns Hetherington
- Date of birth: 22 January 1911
- Place of birth: Walker, England
- Date of death: December 1968 (aged 57)
- Place of death: Newcastle upon Tyne, England
- Height: 5 ft 11 1/2 in (1.82 m)
- Position: Goalkeeper

Senior career*
Years	Team	Apps	(Gls)
–1933	Walker Celtic		
1933–1937	Burnley	67	(0)
1937–1939	Jarrow		
1939	Barnsley	0	(0)
1946–1947	Gateshead	1	(0)
- * Club domestic league appearances and goals

Thomas Burns Hetherington was an English professional footballer who played as a goalkeeper.
