= Gilles Caouette =

Canadian politician (1940–2009)

Leader of the Social Credit Party
- Acting
- In office June 29, 1977 – April 11, 1978
- Preceded by: André-Gilles Fortin
- Succeeded by: Charles-Arthur Gauthier (acting)

Member of Parliament for Témiscamingue
- In office May 24, 1977 – May 22, 1979
- Preceded by: Réal Caouette
- Succeeded by: Henri Tousignant

Member of Parliament for Charlevoix
- In office October 30, 1972 – July 8, 1974
- Preceded by: Martial Asselin
- Succeeded by: Charles Lapointe

Personal details
- Born: February 16, 1940 Rouyn, Quebec, Canada (now Rouyn-Noranda, Quebec)
- Died: August 13, 2009 (aged 69)
- Party: Social Credit (1963–1964; 1972–1979); Ralliement créditiste (1965–1972)
- Parent: Réal Caouette (father)
- Occupation: Administrator, draftsman, research director, technician

Gilles Caouette (French pronunciation: [ʒil kawɛt]; February 16, 1940 – August 13, 2009) was a Canadian politician and member of Parliament.

Caouette was born in Rouyn-Noranda, Quebec. His father, Réal Caouette, was a prominent Social Credit politician, and leader of the Ralliement créditiste and later the Social Credit Party of Canada.

Gilles followed in his father’s footsteps, and ran unsuccessfully for election to the House of Commons of Canada as a Ralliement créditiste or Social Credit candidate three times (1963, 1964 and 1965). He finally won election from Charlevoix in the 1972 election with a margin of 159 votes.

Gilles was defeated in the 1974 election, and in a 1975 by-election in Hochelaga.

His father died in 1976, resulting in a by-election in the Témiscamingue riding that his father had held since 1962. Gilles won the May 24, 1977 by-election, and returned to the House of Commons. On June 24, 1977, Réal’s successor as Social Credit party leader, André-Gilles Fortin, died at the age of 33. Gilles became acting party leader on June 29. He had intended to run at the party's leadership convention but refused to run and resigned as interim leader when the party's executive council decided to hold the convention earlier rather than later and hold it in Winnipeg, Manitoba instead of Quebec where most party members (and all of its Members of Parliament) lived. He was replaced as interim leader by Charles-Arthur Gauthier.

Caouette ran in the 1979 election but lost his seat in the House of Commons.

Outside politics he worked as an administrator, draftsman, research director, and as a technician.

Election results
| Date of election | Party | Riding | Place | # of votes | % of popular vote |
| 8 April 1963 general election | Social Credit | Laurier | 2nd of 4 | 4,282 | 23.8% |
| 10 February 1964 by-election | Social Credit | Laurier | 2nd of 5 | 2,232 | 21.6% |
| 8 November 1965 general election | Ralliement créditiste | Labelle | 2nd of 4 | 3,697 | 23.7% |
| 30 October 1972 general election | Social Credit | Charlevoix | elected (1st of 3) | 10,264 | 39.3% |
| 8 July 1974 general election | Social Credit | Charlevoix | 2nd of 4 | 8,905 | 35.7% |
| 14 October 1974 by-election | Social Credit | Hochelaga | 3rd of 7 | 1,729 | 10.2% |
| 24 May 1977 by-election | Social Credit | Témiscamingue | elected (1st of 5) | 9,603 | 45.7% |
| 22 May 1979 general election | Social Credit | Témiscamingue | 2nd of 7 | 15,295 | 39.1% |

== Electoral record ==
Canadian federal by-election, 14 October 1975: Hochelaga
| Party | Candidate | Votes | % | ±% |
|---|---|---|---|---|
Pelletier resigned, 29 August 1975
| Progressive Conservative | Jacques Lavoie | 8,236 | 48.58 | +18.19 |
| Liberal | Pierre Juneau | 5,649 | 33.32 | -16.54 |
| Social Credit | Gilles Caouette | 1,729 | 10.20 | -0.46 |
| New Democratic | Onias Synnott | 675 | 3.98 | -2.92 |
| Independent | Gérard Contant | 396 | 2.34 | |
| Independent | Louise Ouimet | 169 | 1.00 | |
| Independent | Daniel Charlebois | 101 | 0.60 | |
| Total valid votes | | 16,955 | 100.00 | |
