= Social Credit Party of Canada =

Political party in Canada

Social Credit Party of Canada Parti Crédit social du Canada
- Founder: William Aberhart
- Founded: October 14, 1935
- Dissolved: September 27, 1993
- Ideology: Social credit; Right-wing populism
- Political position: Right-wing
- Colours: Green

The Social Credit Party of Canada (French: Parti Crédit social du Canada), colloquially known as the Socreds, was a populist political party in Canada that promoted social credit theories of monetary reform. It was the federal wing of the Canadian social credit movement.

== Origins and founding: 1932–1963 ==
The Canadian social credit movement emerged during the Great Depression from the monetary reform theories of British engineer C. H. Douglas, whose ideas argued that economic hardship was caused in part by a shortage of consumer purchasing power. In Canada, the movement first became a major political force in Alberta, where Baptist evangelist William Aberhart promoted social credit ideas through radio broadcasts, study groups, and public meetings. Aberhart's religious background gave the Alberta movement a pronounced evangelical and socially conservative character, which distinguished it from Douglas's original economic theory.

Aberhart's Alberta Social Credit Party won the 1935 Alberta general election, taking 56 of 63 seats and forming what has often been described as the first Social Credit government in the world. The provincial victory encouraged social credit supporters to enter federal politics later the same year. In the 1935 Canadian federal election, Social Credit candidates ran mainly in Western Canada and won 17 seats, including 15 in Alberta. John Horne Blackmore, elected in Lethbridge, was chosen as parliamentary leader, while Aberhart, who remained premier of Alberta and did not run federally, was widely regarded as the movement's dominant figure.

The new federal movement drew support from western protest politics, including former supporters of the Progressive Party of Canada and the United Farmers movement. Like the Co-operative Commonwealth Federation, which also first contested a federal election in 1935, Social Credit benefited from Depression-era dissatisfaction with the old-line parties. Its base, however, was more strongly rural, western, and monetary-reform oriented than that of the CCF.

In 1939, Social Credit supporters joined the New Democracy movement led by William Duncan Herridge, a former Conservative adviser and Canadian envoy to the United States. Herridge advocated monetary reform and state intervention as responses to the Depression, ideas that overlapped with the social credit movement. In the 1940 Canadian federal election, Social Credit and New Democracy candidates ran under a loose common banner. Herridge failed to win a seat, and Blackmore continued as parliamentary leader of the Social Credit group.

At the movement's first national convention in 1944, delegates abandoned the New Democracy name and founded the Social Credit Association of Canada as a national party. The convention chose Alberta treasurer Solon Earl Low as the party's first official national leader. Low led the party through the postwar period and was elected to the House of Commons for Peace River in the 1945 Canadian federal election.

In its early years, Social Credit was also associated with antisemitism within parts of the movement. Historians have noted that several prominent social crediters promoted conspiracy theories about Jewish financiers or used antisemitic material in political argument. Low publicly repudiated antisemitism in the late 1950s, and the party gradually distanced itself from its earlier antisemitic associations.

Under Low, the party remained strongest in Alberta and British Columbia. In the 1957 Canadian federal election, Social Credit won 19 seats, its best result to that point, but it was eliminated from the House of Commons in the 1958 Canadian federal election during the Progressive Conservative landslide under John Diefenbaker. Although the party later returned to Parliament, the 1958 defeat weakened Social Credit's position in English Canada and helped establish the Progressive Conservatives as the dominant right-of-centre federal party in the West.

=== Provincial social credit movements ===
==== Alberta ====
Aberhart's version of social credit received a positive response from Albertans. In 1935, much to its own surprise, the Alberta Social Credit Party won the 1935 provincial election, forming the first Social Credit government in the world. It went on to win nine subsequent elections, and governed until 1971.

==== Quebec ====
In the 1940s, Social Credit supporters in Quebec often ran under the name Union des électeurs. This was a social credit organization that was formed in 1939 by Louis Even and Gilberte Côté-Mercier as the political arm of their religious organization, the Pilgrims of Saint Michael. They shared some ideologies, but did not merge or collaborate with the western-based national party and had an inconsistent attitude towards electoral politics. The Union des électeurs' electoral philosophy was that it was not a partisan political party but an organization to marshal voters to enforce their wishes on their elected representatives. Even believed party politics was corrupt and that the party system should be abolished and replaced by a "union of electors" who would compel elected officials to follow the popular will. The Union also favoured a more orthodox application of social credit economic theory, something that the western based Social Credit movement had begun to move away from under the influence of Alberta premier Ernest Manning. This led to tensions with the national party and Even initially opposed the creation of a national Social Credit Party.

Réal Caouette, a member of the Union des électeurs, won a 1946 by-election as a Social Credit MP and ran, unsuccessfully, for re-election as a Union des électeurs candidate in the 1949 federal election. In 1958, Caouette disagreed with Even, Côté-Mercier and the increasingly hostile attitude of the Union des électeurs towards elections and party politics. He founded the Ralliement des créditistes which won recognition as the Quebec wing of the national Social Credit party.

==== Ontario ====
The Union des électeurs philosophy inspired an Ontario group, the Union of Electors led by Ron Gostick, to form in 1950 as a rival to the Ontario Social Credit League. It first ran candidates in the 1948 provincial election under the "Union of Electors" label. Even's views also led to a debate within the national Social Credit Party about whether to continue to run on a Social Credit basis or under the "non-partisan" Union of Electors banner.

==== British Columbia ====
In British Columbia, the movement split: both the British Columbia Social Credit League and the Union of Electors ran candidates in the 1949 provincial election. In the 1952 provincial election, the Social Credit party under W. A. C. Bennett won a plurality of seats (defeating the Co-operative Commonwealth Federation by one seat) in the election. The Socreds won a majority government in 1953, and Bennett governed the province until his loss in the 1972 provincial election. The party won the subsequent 1975 provincial election and governed until 1991.

==== Saskatchewan and Manitoba ====
The provincial social credit parties of Saskatchewan and Manitoba won some ridings in the 1950s and 1960s; however, they were unable to form a government.

== Split between Quebec and English Canadian factions: 1963–1973 ==
In the early 1960s, the party became divided between its English Canadian wing, based mainly in Alberta and British Columbia, and its rapidly growing Quebec wing, led by Réal Caouette. In 1961, Robert Thompson of Alberta defeated Caouette at the party's national leadership convention. The vote totals were not announced. Caouette later claimed that he would have won, but that Alberta premier Ernest Manning advised him to ask Quebec delegates to support Thompson because the party's western wing would not accept a francophone Catholic leader.

The party returned to Parliament in the 1962 Canadian federal election, electing 30 MPs, its highest seat total. Caouette and 25 other Social Credit MPs were elected from Quebec, while only four were elected from the rest of Canada, including Thompson in Red Deer, Alberta. Under these circumstances, Thompson appointed Caouette deputy leader.

The imbalance in the caucus sharpened tensions. Quebec MPs generally regarded Caouette as their effective leader, while Thompson remained the official national leader. Caouette and many Quebec créditistes also continued to emphasize social credit monetary theory, whereas the party's western leadership had increasingly moved toward a broader right-wing populist and conservative orientation. Thompson refused to resign as party leader, and relations between the two wings deteriorated after the 1963 Canadian federal election, in which Social Credit won 24 seats, 20 of them in Quebec.

On September 1, 1963, Quebec Social Credit delegates voted to reject Thompson's leadership. Caouette then led most of the party's Quebec wing into a separate party, the Ralliement des créditistes. Library and Archives Canada describes the split as the result of internal dissension and states that Caouette and 12 Quebec MPs left the national party in September 1963 to sit as the Ralliement des créditistes. The Canadian Elections Database similarly records that the Quebec wing split from the federal party later in 1963 and that 13 Quebec MPs stayed with the new party, while others later ran as independents or joined the Progressive Conservatives.

=== Decline of the party in English Canada ===
After the split, the English Canadian Social Credit Party was concentrated mainly in Alberta and British Columbia. It won five seats in the 1965 Canadian federal election, while Caouette's Ralliement des créditistes won nine seats in Quebec.

The party's difficulties deepened after the 1965 election. British Columbia premier W. A. C. Bennett, whose provincial Social Credit organization was one of the movement's strongest branches, withdrew organizational and financial support from the federal party in an effort to encourage reconciliation with Caouette's créditistes. In March 1967, Thompson resigned as national leader, citing lack of support from the provincial Social Credit organizations.

Later in 1967, Bud Olson, one of the remaining western Social Credit MPs, joined the Liberal Party. Thompson subsequently crossed the floor to the Progressive Conservatives. Alexander Bell Patterson became acting leader of the remaining English Canadian party.

In the 1968 Canadian federal election, the Social Credit Party lost its remaining seats in English Canada, while the Ralliement créditiste won 14 seats in Quebec. The result effectively ended the federal Social Credit Party's parliamentary presence outside Quebec.

=== Reunification ===
In 1971, the English Canadian Social Credit Party and the Quebec-based Ralliement créditiste reunited under the Social Credit name. At a joint leadership convention in Hull, Quebec, Caouette was elected leader of the reunited party on the first ballot. The reunification effectively shifted the party's federal base to Quebec.

In the 1972 Canadian federal election, the reunited Social Credit Party won 15 seats, all of them in Quebec, and received 7.6 percent of the national popular vote. Ernest Manning had been appointed to the Senate of Canada in 1970, becoming the only Social Credit figure to serve in that chamber. Patterson returned to Parliament as a Progressive Conservative in the 1972 election.

== Decline: 1973–1980 ==
Despite a modest success in the 1970 Quebec election, the provincial wing of the party was wracked continually by internal divisions, eventually splitting into two factions, one led by Camil Samson and the other by Armand Bois. On February 4, 1973, former federal Liberal cabinet minister Yvon Dupuis was elected leader of the Ralliement créditiste du Québec, but failed to win his riding of Saint-Jean in the 1973 provincial election, and the party only retained two of their 12 seats. Under pressure and without a seat, Dupuis resigned the leadership on May 5, 1974.

In the 1974 federal election, the Social Credit Party machine in Quebec began to fall apart. Caouette was recovering from a snowmobiling accident and was unable to actively lead the party. When he was able to speak, Caouette focused his campaign on the Tories and the New Democratic Party instead of the Liberals, even though the Liberals were Social Credit's main competitor in Quebec. Two weeks before the election was called, Caouette had informed the parliamentary caucus that he would resign as leader in the fall.

Party rallies faced declining, aging audiences. Feuding within the party had accelerated and some ridings in Quebec had two Social Credit candidates, while others — including the party's Lévis stronghold — had none. Many Social Credit MPs ran for re-election on their own strengths, making little mention of the party or its leader in their campaign materials. The party's support in Quebec was undermined by rumours that its MPs had made deals with the Progressive Conservatives during Caouette's illness.

The Socreds won 11 seats, which was considered a success in light of the divisions that plagued their campaign, but was one short of the 12 seats needed for official party status in the House of Commons. The Socreds failed in their attempts to convince Independent MP Leonard Jones to join their party and the Socreds made attempts to get recognition as an official party. The Speaker of the House of Commons, with approval from the Liberal government, decided to recognize the party.

=== Leadership turmoil ===
The decline of the party accelerated after Caouette resigned from the party leadership in 1976. He was hospitalized after a stroke on September 16, and died later that year. The party held its leadership convention November 6–7, 1976 at the Civic Centre in Ottawa. This time, 85% of the delegates were from Quebec.

André-Gilles Fortin, the 32-year-old MP for Lotbinière won the convention on the second ballot. Fortin presented a young, dynamic image, but campaigned on traditional social credit economic theory and supporting small business. Fortin was killed in a car accident on June 24, 1977, after serving only eight months as leader. Réal's son, Gilles Caouette, was named acting leader five days after Fortin's death.

In 1978, Socreds elected Lorne Reznowski as their leader, in an attempt to revive the party outside of Quebec. Reznowski, an anglophone Manitoban, presented himself as a candidate in the October 16, 1978, by-elections and fared extremely poorly with 2.76% of votes in the riding of Saint Boniface. He resigned quickly thereafter and was replaced as acting leader by Charles-Arthur Gauthier.

=== Roy's leadership ===
Popular provincial créditiste Fabien Roy was selected to lead Social Credit just before the 1979 election. Under Roy, the party won the tacit support of the separatist Parti Québécois, which had become the government of Quebec three years earlier. Social Credit attempted to rally the separatist and nationalist vote: Canadian flags were absent at its campaign kick-off rally, and the party's slogan was C'est à notre tour ('It's our turn'), which was reminiscent of the popular separatist anthem "Gens du pays" that includes the chorus, C'est à votre tour de vous laisser parler d'amour. The party focused its platform on constitutional change, promising to fight to abolish the federal government's never-used right to disallow any provincial legislation, and stating that each province has a "right to choose its own destiny within Canada".

Gilles Caouette publicly denounced what he called péquistes déguisés en créditistes ('PQ supporters disguised as Socreds'). Caouette had said that he wanted to work within the spirit and letter of Confederation, stating, "Let us not burn our bridges. It is not the time for the Ralliement des créditistes to be separatists, but rather to win recognition for the French fact within Canada." Caouette said that he would fight for the recognition of French Canada's aspirations within Confederation on the basis of a partnership with the other nine provinces, "but if this partnership cannot be brought about, I shall become the more ardent separatist in Quebec."

The party increased its vote in areas where the PQ was popular, but lost support in areas of traditional Socred strength. This resulted in the Socred caucus being cut in half, from eleven seats to six, and a slightly reduced share of the popular vote compared to the 1974 election.

=== Clark minority government ===
Joe Clark's Progressive Conservatives formed a minority government after the 1979 federal election. The Socreds had just enough seats to give the Tories a majority in the House of Commons. Clark, however, declared that he would govern as if he had a majority and refused to grant the small Social Credit caucus the official party status it wanted or make concessions to the party in order to gain its votes. Clark convinced one Socred MP, Richard Janelle from Lotbinière, to cross the floor and join the government caucus. In December 1979, the remaining five members of the Social Credit caucus demanded that the Conservatives amend their budget to allocate the controversial gas tax revenues to Quebec. Clark refused and the Socreds abstained in a vote on a motion of non-confidence, which, along with several Conservative party members not being able to attend the vote, caused the government to fall.

While Roy cited a prior precedent in then-leader Réal Caouette having the party abstain in a motion of non-confidence in the government of Lester B. Pearson in 1968, his doing the same would prove to be a disastrous and, ultimately, fatal miscalculation. Whereas the make-up of the 1968 parliament had been such that the motion of non-confidence in Pearson had little realistic chance of succeeding (and Caouette's abstention definitively ended any chance of it doing so), the margins in the 1979 parliament were sufficiently tight that, had the Socreds supported the government and even one of the absent Progressive Conservative MPs been present, the motion of non-confidence would have tied on votes and, according to tradition, been defeated by the speaker's casting vote. Moreover, both of the party's major bases of support were alienated by the abstention, with the Quebec nationalist faction seeing Socreds as being ineffective at representing the province's interests, and the social conservative faction being enraged that the party had effectively offered former prime minister Pierre Trudeau, who had intended to resign as Liberal Party leader until Clark's government fell, a route back into power. In the 1980 election the Socreds' popular vote fell to 1.7 percent, and it lost its remaining seats. All five Socred MPs lost to Liberal challengers, though all but one of them finished a close second in their ridings.

The death of Social Credit candidate Nelson Lassard in the riding of Frontenac, Quebec, resulted in the postponement of the election in that riding to March 24, 1980. Fabien Roy sought to return to the House of Commons in that by-election, but lost to the Liberal candidate. Roy resigned as leader on November 1, 1980. The party would never come remotely close to winning a seat in the House of Commons again.

== Denouement: 1981–1993 ==
After Fabien Roy's resignation, the party chose Martin Hattersley in 1981 as interim leader over Alberta evangelist Ken Sweigard. Hattersley was an Edmonton lawyer and former British army officer.

In the May 4, 1981 by-election in Levis, Quebec, the party nominated Martin Caya. Caya placed sixth in a field of seven candidates, winning 367 votes (1.1% of the total), ahead of renegade Socred John Turmel. In the August 17, 1981 by-election in Quebec, party president Carl O’Malley placed 5th in a field of eight candidates, with 92 votes (0.2% of the total). Turmel won 42 votes, placing last.

Hattersley resigned in 1983 when the party overturned his decision to expel Jim Keegstra and two other Albertans accused of anti-Semitism from the party.

In June 1983, Sweigard was elected interim leader by means of a telephone conference call of 19 party executive members, with nine votes to five votes for party vice-president Richard Lawrence. Quebec party member Adrien Lambert was nominated, but could not be reached by telephone. He nonetheless won two votes.

When the call began, two candidates were in the race: professional gambler John Turmel of Ottawa, and tractor dealer Elmer Knutson of Edmonton, the founder of West-Fed, a western Canada separatist movement.

Turmel's candidacy was rejected on the basis that his membership had been suspended. Turmel formed the Christian Credit Party, and later, the Abolitionist Party of Canada, both based on social credit principles. Knutson failed to win endorsement because he was not well known by the members of the executive. Knutson quit the party to form the Confederation of Regions Party.

The meeting decided to appoint an interim leader until a leadership convention could be held in September 1983. This convention was deferred until June 1986, and Sweigard remained as interim leader until that time. Also in 1983, Manning retired from the Senate after reaching the mandatory retirement age of 75, ending Social Credit's representation on Parliament Hill.

In the 1984 election, the party nominated 52 candidates in 51 ridings, the second-fewest that it had ever run since it began nominating candidates east of Manitoba. None of those candidates even came close to being elected, and the party collected a total of 17,044 votes (0.13% of votes cast in all ridings), losing over 92 percent of its 1980 vote and dropping from fourth place to ninth place. Two candidates ran as Social Credit candidates in the BC riding of Prince George-Peace River. The party's strength remained in Quebec and Alberta, but also ran candidates in British Columbia, Saskatchewan, Ontario and New Brunswick. For all intents and purposes, this was the end of Social Credit as a viable party.

1984 election results
Province	№ of candidates	№ of votes
British Columbia	8	3,479
Alberta	13	5,193
Saskatchewan	1	772
Ontario	6	865
Quebec	22	6,633
New Brunswick	1	102
Total	51	17,044

Sweigard resigned as leader in 1986. The party's leadership was won by the socially conservative Ontario evangelical minister Harvey Lainson, who defeated Holocaust denier James Keegstra by 67 votes to 38 at a delegated convention in Toronto. Lainson's campaign focused on gun rights and an opposition to abortion and the metric system. (He was not affiliated with the anti-Semitic groups that endorsed Keegstra.)

In July 1987, the party's national executive ousted Lainson over his call to rename the party the Christian Freedom Party of Canada and Keegstra was appointed acting leader. Lainson, however, refused to relinquish the leadership and Keegstra was expelled from the Social Credit Party and its successor the Christian Freedom Social Credit Party in September. The party was still listed with Elections Canada as the Social Credit Party.

The party nominated Andrew Varaday as its candidate in the 1987 Hamilton Mountain by-election. He won 149 votes (0.4% of the total), placing last in a field of six candidates, which included John Turmel (166 votes).

In the 1988 election, what remained of the party nominated nine candidates: six in Quebec, two in Ontario, and one in British Columbia. These candidates collected a total of 3,408 votes (0.02% of votes cast in all ridings). The British Columbia candidate, running in New Westminster—Burnaby, won 718 votes (1.3% of the total). Although the party came far short of nominating the 50 candidates required for official status, the Chief Electoral Officer agreed to put the party's name on the ballots for the nine candidates on the basis of its half-century historical status as an official party.

Lainson resigned as leader in 1990, and another social conservative evangelist, Ken Campbell, took over the party. He continued to describe the party as the Christian Freedom Party in public appearances, although he also retained the "Social Credit" name on official documents for tax purposes. Under Campbell, the party began moving back toward traditional social credit theory.

The party nominated two candidates in by-elections, each of whom won 96 votes. In the February 12 by-election in Chambly, Quebec, Emilian Martel placed last in a field of six, winning 0.2% of the total vote. Party leader Ken Campbell placed seventh out of ten, winning 0.4% of the total vote in the August 13 by-election in Oshawa, Ontario. John Turmel placed last with 50 votes in this race.

After changes to election law required a party to nominate at least 50 candidates in order to keep its registration and assets, Campbell scrambled to nominate at least that number for the 1993 election so he could relaunch the party under the Christian Freedom name. However, it was only able to nominate ten candidates and was deregistered by Elections Canada on September 27, 1993. Its candidates in that election appeared on the ballot as non-affiliated candidates. Campbell later ran as an unofficial "Christian Freedom Party" candidate in a 1996 by-election in Hamilton East, appearing on the ballot as an independent.

Social Credit has never made another attempt to run candidates again. However, it continued to exist as an incorporated non-profit entity, the "Social Credit Party of Canada, Incorporated." Until his death in 2006, Campbell used it to publish political advocacy material in order to preserve his ministry's status as a religious charity.

== Election results (1935–1988) ==
(These results include New Democracy candidates in the 1940 election but does not include those for Union des électeurs, Independent Social Credit candidates, or the Ralliement des créditistes.)

Election	Party leader	# of candidates nominated	# of seats won	±	standing	# of total votes	% of popular vote
1935	William Aberhart (de facto)	46	17 / 245	▲17	▲3rd	180,679	4.10%
1940 (Note: In the 1940 election, former Canadian ambassador to the US W. D. Herridge led a group of 17 candidates (including some Social Credit incumbents such as party leader Blackmore and prominent social crediters such as Louis Even) as members of a monetary reform party called New Democracy, which was endorsed by the Social Credit movement. New Democracy ran 17 candidates, received 73,083 votes (1.59%), and won 3 seats (Robert Fair, Walter Frederick Kuhl, and Blackmore – all of whom were incumbent Social Credit MPs running for re-election as New Democracy candidates). Nine seats were contested by candidates who ran under the Social Credit banner – they received 46,271 votes (1%), and 7 of them were elected. Herridge failed to win a seat in Parliament and the 3 New Democracy MPs joined the 7-member Social Credit MPs the House of Commons, under Blackmore's leadership, with a caucus seat total of 10 members. After the election, the combined caucus was known as New Democracy; the party's national convention in 1944 voted to revert to the name Social Credit.)	W.D. Herridge/J.H. Blackmore	29	10 / 245	▼7	▼4th	119,345	2.59%
1945	Solon Low	93	13 / 245	▲3	4th	212,220	4.05%
1949	Solon Low	28	10 / 262	▼3	4th	135,217	2.31%
1953	Solon Low	72	15 / 265	▲5	4th	305,551	5.42%
1957	Solon Low	114	19 / 265	▲4	4th	434,312	6.57%
1958	Solon Low	82	0 / 265	▼19	4th	188,356	2.58%
1962	R.N. Thompson	226	30 / 265	▲30	▲3rd	893,479	11.60%
1963	R.N. Thompson	224	24 / 265	▼6	3rd	940,703	11.92%
1965 (Note: In the 1965, Quebec social crediters ran separately as the Ralliement des créditistes winning nine seats and 4.66% of the vote.)	R.N. Thompson	86	5 / 265	▼19	▼5th	282,454	3.66%
1968 (Note: In the 1968, Quebec social crediters ran separately as the Ralliement des créditistes winning 14 seats and 4.43% of the vote.)	A.B. Patterson	32	0 / 264	▼5	5th	68,742	0.85%
1972 (Note: The Quebec-based Ralliement des créditistes, which had won 14 seats in 1968 and was the 4th place party, reunited with the national Social Credit party, essentially taking it over. All seats won by the party in 1972 and subsequently were in Quebec. When the 1972 results are compared to the Railliement's 1968 results there is only a gain of 1 seat and an increase in the popular vote of 2.27 percentage points and no change in place.)	Réal Caouette	164	15 / 264	▲15***	▲4th***	730,759	7.55%
1974	Réal Caouette	152	11 / 264	▼4	4th	481,231	5.06%
1979	Fabien Roy	103	6 / 282	▼5	4th	527,604	4.61%
1980	Fabien Roy	81	0 / 282	▼6	4th	185,486	1.70%
1984	Ken Sweigard	51	0 / 282	Steady	▼9th	16,659	0.13%
1988	Harvey Lainson	9	0 / 295	Steady	▼12th	3,407	0.03%

== Attempted revival ==
From 2006 to 2009 Wayne Cook, a father's rights activist from Toronto and candidate in 2000 for the Canadian Action Party, attempted to revive the national Social Credit Party of Canada/Parti Crédit Social du Canada. His attempt failed to win sufficient support to enable his group to become a registered political party with Elections Canada and the group did not run candidates in the 2008 federal election on either an official or unofficial basis. In June 2009, he announced that his unregistered Social Credit Party of Canada would fold and urged all members to join with the Christian Heritage Party of Canada.

Since the demise of the federal party, several small fringe parties have attempted to promote social credit economic policy while not advocating the social conservativism that the Social Credit Party was known for. John Turmel, who is in the Guinness Book of Records for the most elections contested and for the most elections lost, is an advocate of social credit monetary theory and founded the Abolitionist Party of Canada which ran 80 candidates in the 1993 federal election on a social credit style economic platform. The party was dissolved in 1996. (Turmel also founded the short-lived Christian Credit Party in the early 1980s after he was expelled from the Social Credit Party.)

The Canada Party, founded by former Social Credit candidate Joseph Thauberger, also ran candidates in the 1993 election on a platform of monetary reform influenced by social credit. Many of its members also belonged to the social credit influenced Committee on Monetary and Economic Reform (COMER). In 1997, the Canada Party merged with the left economic nationalist Canadian Action Party which, while not a social credit party per se, adopted a monetary reform policy that is heavily influenced by COMER and the Canada Party.

== Leaders ==
- John Horne Blackmore, MP (1935–1944) parliamentary leader
- Solon Earl Low, MP (1944–1961)
- Robert Thompson, MP (1961–1967)
- Alexander Bell Patterson, MP (1967–1968) acting leader
- Réal Caouette, MP (1971–1976)
- André-Gilles Fortin, MP (1976–1977)
- Gilles Caouette, MP (1977–1978) acting leader
- Charles-Arthur Gauthier, MP (1978) acting leader
- Lorne Reznowski (1978–1979)
- Charles-Arthur Gauthier, MP (1979) acting leader
- Fabien Roy, MP (1979–1980)
- Martin Hattersley (1981–1983)
- Ken Sweigard (1983–1986) acting leader
- Harvey Lainson (1986–1990)
- Jim Keegstra acting leader (July 27–28, 1987)
- Ken Campbell (1990–1993)

Source:Parliament of Canada website: Party File: Social Credit Party

== See also ==
- Canadian social credit movement
- Ralliement créditiste
- List of Social Credit/Créditistes MPs
- Social Credit Party of Alberta
- Social Credit Party of British Columbia
- Ralliement créditiste du Québec
- Manitoba Social Credit Party
- Social Credit Party of Saskatchewan
- Social Credit Party of Ontario
