= Lorne Reznowski =

Canadian academic and politician (1929–2011)

Leader of the Social Credit Party
- In office May 7, 1978 – February 23, 1979
- Preceded by: Charles-Arthur Gauthier (acting)
- Succeeded by: Charles-Arthur Gauthier (acting)

Personal details
- Born: January 5, 1929 Winnipeg, Manitoba, Canada
- Died: November 9, 2011 (aged 82) Winnipeg, Manitoba, Canada
- Occupation: English professor

Lorne A. Reznowski (January 5, 1929 – November 9, 2011) was a Canadian professor of English at the University of Manitoba and leader of the Social Credit Party of Canada.

== Background ==
He was the son of Ukrainian-Canadians Lorne William Reznowski and Anna Angela Brokowska. Reznowski received a BA degree from Loyola College in Montreal in 1949 and then worked as a longshoreman on the Pacific coast. He graduated with a Licentiate in Sacred Theology from the Catholic University of America in Washington, D.C. in 1957.

He then studied at the University of Ottawa where he earned MA and PhD degrees in English Literature.

He returned to Winnipeg in 1966 to teach at St. Paul’s College at the University of Manitoba and taught there until his retirement in 1993.

He was active in the Social Credit Party since the age of 12 when he made radio broadcasts for the party.

A one-time national secretary of the Social Credit Party, Reznowski once worked for former Socred leader Robert N. Thompson and was a "doctrinal purist" when it came to social credit monetary theory. He was the party's candidate in Provencher for the 1968 Canadian federal election, receiving 8.2% of the popular vote.

Reznowski ran for the party leadership at its 1978 convention and was elected leader. He resigned four months after losing an October 16, 1978 by-election in Saint Boniface, Manitoba, in which he finished in fourth place with only 1,204 votes out of 43,572 valid votes (2.76%).

Reznowski cited the need for him to finish his doctoral thesis in medieval literature in order to retain his teaching position for his resignation. However, he also said that the party wanted a francophone leader and that it would have a better chance of retaining its nine seats in the House of Commons of Canada, all of which were in Quebec, with a leader from that province. It had been hoped that Reznowski's leadership would help revive the party in its former base of Western Canada.

== Policies ==
Reznowski was described as a "doctrinal purist" who advocated the original social credit monetary theory of C.H. Douglas. He promised that a Social Credit government would cut retail sales tax by 25 per cent and argued for moral responsibility in society with the family as its basic union. He also expressed his opposition to homosexuality, abortion, birth control and working mothers and his support for capital punishment. Reznowki also argued that Prime Minister Pierre Trudeau was soft on communism and that there was an imminent threat of a takeover of Canada by the Soviet Union. As national party leader Reznowski criticized Bill Bennett, leader of the British Columbia Social Credit Party and Premier of British Columbia for rejecting social credit doctrine quipping that Ogopogo would be a better name for Bennett's party.

== Electoral history ==
1968 Canadian federal election: Provencher
Party	Candidate	Votes	%	±%
Liberal	Mark Smerchanski	9,021	41.6	+2.7
Progressive Conservative	Warner Jorgenson	7,791	36.0	-12.1
New Democratic	Harry Blake-Knox	3,078	14.2	+10.2
Social Credit	Lorne Reznowski	1,773	8.2	-0.7
Total valid votes		21,663	100.0	

Canadian federal by-election, 16 October 1978
Party	Candidate	Votes	%	±%
On Mr. Guay's resignation, 23 March 1978
Progressive Conservative	Jack Hare	18,552	42.6	+6.4
Liberal	Robert Bockstael	13,804	31.7	-10.9
New Democratic	Grant Wichenko	9,570	22.0	+1.8
Social Credit	Lorne Reznowski	1,204	2.8	+1.7
Independent	Donald Bryan Oliver	281	0.6	
Independent	William Hawryluk	161	0.4	
Total valid votes		43,572	100.0	
