= Ken Campbell (evangelist) =

- Campbell circa 2003

Leader of the Social Credit Party of Canada
- In office 1990–1993
- Preceded by: Harvey Lainson
- Succeeded by: Position abolished

Personal details
- Born: Kenneth Livingstone Campbell; January 15, 1934 Pickering, Ontario
- Died: August 28, 2006 (aged 72) Delta, British Columbia
- Resting place: Erskine Cemetery, Pickering
- Party: Social Credit
- Spouse: Norma Campbell (died 2006)
- Occupation: Christian evangelical minister

Kenneth Livingstone Campbell (January 15, 1934 – August 28, 2006) was a Canadian fundamentalist Baptist evangelist and political figure. He was the final leader of the Social Credit Party of Canada from 1990 to 1993.

== Opposition to abortion and homosexuality ==
He became prominent in the Toronto area in the 1970s as a critic of gay rights and as an anti-abortion campaigner, founding Renaissance Canada in 1974 to promote his views, particularly in education. He held frequent rallies against gay rights and regularly took out full-page ads in newspapers, campaigning against gay rights and secular humanism. Many such ads were printed following court decisions on gay rights, such as the 1998 Supreme Court ruling in Vriend v. Alberta.

In 1979, outside the Toronto mayor's office, Campbell organized a protest rally against the LGBTQ publication The Body Politic alongside Christian television talk-show host David Mainse in response to an article it had published by Gerald Hannon in the December 1977/January 1978 issue (reprinted in March/April 1979) entitled "Men Loving Boys Loving Men." While being interviewed by the media during the rally, Campbell stated, "when a group advocates the molestation of children one has to question the social constructive nature of the whole cause they represent."

In 1980, Campbell published a book, No Small Stir: A Spiritual Strategy for Salting and Saving a Secular Society, with a forward from Jerry Falwell.

== Political career ==
Campbell ran in elections at all levels in the 1980s and 1990s, particularly in the provincial riding of St. George—St. David, which included the centre of Toronto's gay community clustered around Church and Wellesley streets. In 1984, following the acquittal of Henry Morgentaler, he founded a group called Choose Life Canada which picketed abortion clinics in Toronto and other Ontario cities. On one occasion, he attempted to conduct a "citizen's arrest" against provincial Attorney General Ian Scott, after Scott refused to shut down an abortion clinic run by Morgentaler. Campbell later ran against Scott in St. George—St. David as a candidate of the Family Coalition Party in the 1990 provincial election. He campaigned as a fringe candidate for Mayor of Toronto the following year, but urged voters to support June Rowlands rather than himself to prevent Jack Layton from winning.

He once ran for mayor of Milton, Ontario against long-time mayor Gordon Krantz to protest having to pay the education portion of his municipal property taxes. Campbell refused to pay on the basis that he disagreed with the school curriculum.

Campbell sent Krantz a letter during the campaign, saying that if he were elected, he would be too busy to be mayor so he would "deputize" Krantz and have him do the job.

Campbell took over the near-moribund Social Credit Party of Canada in 1990, and ran in a by-election in Oshawa placing eighth, with 96 votes. Under Campbell, the party began to re-embrace traditional social credit theory after years of moving away from it. He began the process of renaming the party as the Christian Freedom Party. While it was still registered under the Social Credit name, he used the "Christian Freedom" name in most of his speeches.

However, the party was only able to field 10 candidates for the 1993 election—well short of the 50 required for a party to keep its registration—and was deregistered by Elections Canada in October 1993.

As a result, Campbell was forced to run as an independent, finishing last in a field of six candidates in Oakville. He ran a final time, again as an independent, in a 1996 federal by-election in Hamilton East, finishing in fifth place with 287 votes.

After being deregistered, the party continued as an incorporated non-profit entity known as the "Social Credit Party of Canada, Incorporated". Campbell occasionally used it as a podium for his political activities in order to preserve his church's status as a religious charity.

== Life after politics ==
On June 12, 1999, Ken Campbell presented a workshop at the Media Ministry Conference held in conjunction with Tyndale University's Arts, Media and Music Conference in Toronto, Ontario. For a number of years, Campbell hosted a daily Christian evangelical radio show on CJMR in Mississauga.

In 1999, he protested a same-sex wedding ceremony at Brent Hawkes's Metropolitan Community Church. In around 2000, while recovering from prostate cancer, Campbell moved himself and his ministry from Ontario to the interior of British Columbia.

In 2003, Campbell claimed that Toronto's SARS epidemic would cease when the city ended its Gay Pride Parade (which he described as an "AIDS Parade").

Predeceased by his wife Norma, who died in January 2006, Ken Campbell succumbed to cancer on August 28, 2006, aged 72, while receiving palliative care in a Delta, British Columbia hospital.
