= André-Gilles Fortin =

Canadian politician

Leader of the Social Credit Party
- In office November 7, 1976 – June 24, 1977
- Preceded by: Réal Caouette
- Succeeded by: Gilles Caouette (acting)

Member of Parliament for Lotbinière
- In office June 25, 1968 – June 24, 1977
- Preceded by: Auguste Choquette
- Succeeded by: Richard Janelle

Personal details
- Born: November 13, 1943
- Died: June 24, 1977 (aged 33) Trans-Canada Highway, Quebec, Canada
- Party: Social Credit (1971–1977)
- Other political affiliations: Ralliement Créditiste (1968–1971)
- Occupation: Professor

André-Gilles Fortin (French pronunciation: [ɑ̃dʁe ʒil fɔʁtɛ̃]; November 13, 1943 – June 24, 1977) was a Canadian politician. Fortin was a member of the House of Commons of Canada for Lotbinière. He was first elected in the 1968 federal election for the Ralliement Créditiste, which in 1971 merged with the Social Credit Party of Canada.

Fortin was elected leader of the party on November 7, 1976, after his popular predecessor, Réal Caouette, was forced to resign due to illness. The party was then struggling, having lost almost all its support in the west and in decline in Quebec where its members were divided between support for Canadian federalism and for sovereignty association for Quebec, a position supported by René Matte whom Fortin defeated for the leadership. Fortin's efforts to rebuild the party were cut short when he was killed after only eight months as leader.

Fortin died in a car crash at about three in the morning on June 24, 1977, at the age of 33. It is believed that he fell asleep while driving and his car went off the highway, where it missed a bridge and jumped over a river, slamming into the embankment on the other side. The accident took place on the Trans-Canada Highway between Montreal and Quebec City. At the time of his death, he had two young children.

Réal Caouette's son, Gilles Caouette, became acting leader of the party five days later.

== Archives ==
There is a André-Gilles Fortin fonds at Library and Archives Canada. Archival reference number is R7123.

== Electoral record ==
1968 Canadian federal election: Lotbinière
Party	Candidate	Votes
Ralliement créditiste	André-Gilles Fortin	11,302
Liberal	Fernand Beaudet	9,743
Progressive Conservative	Gérard Ouellet	8,215
New Democratic	Marcel Laurin	732

1972 Canadian federal election: Lotbinière
Party	Candidate	Votes
Social Credit	André-Gilles Fortin	21,366
Liberal	Henri Brunelle	9,836
Progressive Conservative	Pierre Beaudet	4,258

1974 Canadian federal election: Lotbinière
Party	Candidate	Votes
Social Credit	André-Gilles Fortin	21,448
Liberal	Normand Bégin	10,885
Progressive Conservative	Victor Paul	2,833
New Democratic	Nicole Drapeau	504
lop.parl.ca
