= Harvey Lainson =

Leader of the Social Credit Party of Canada
- In office 1986 – July 27, 1987
- Preceded by: Ken Sweigard
- Succeeded by: James Keegstra (acting)
- In office July 28, 1987 – 1990
- Preceded by: James Keegstra (acting)
- Succeeded by: Ken Campbell

Personal details
- Born: Harvey George Lainson c. 1935
- Died: February 28, 2005 (aged 69–70)
- Party: Social Credit Party of Canada
- Other political affiliations: Social Credit Party of Ontario
- Spouse: Grace Ann Peel (m. 1957)
- Children: 4
- Occupation: Christian evangelical minister

Harvey George Lainson (c. 1935 – February 28, 2005) was a Canadian Christian evangelical minister based in the Cambridge, Ontario, region and was leader of the Social Credit Party of Canada from 1986 to 1990 during which time he led a successful effort to expel an antisemitic faction led by Jim Keegstra from the party.

Lainson was a longtime party member and stood as a Social Credit candidate during the 1962 federal election in the riding of St. John—Albert, New Brunswick. He led the Ontario Social Credit Party during the 1967 general election and was its candidate in Kitchener. He won the federal party's June 1986 leadership convention defeating Keegstra by a margin of 67 vote to 38.

Lainson hoped to rename the party Christian Freedom since he thought people mistook the name "social credit" for socialist and rebuild the party with the support of Christian fundamentalists He faced resistance from the onset of his leadership with Keegstra's supporters insisting that Lainson was part of a conspiracy and pledging to obstruct him. "We're going to stonewall this guy. There's no way we're going to do business with him. As far as we're concerned, this bunch is part of the conspiracy," said one Keegstra supporter. He was temporarily deposed as party leader in 1987 in favour of Keegstra. Refusing to resign, Lainson's leadership was reconfirmed at a party convention later in 1987 and was successful in expelling Keegstra from the party.

Lainson led the party through the 1988 federal election in which the depleted party ran only nine candidates and received only 3,407 votes, in what would be its final and worst ever performance in a general election. Lainson did not contest a parliamentary seat. He resigned as party leader in 1990 for unspecified "personal reasons" and was succeeded by another evangelical minister, Ken Campbell.

In his business life, Lainson operated a computer services company for Christian charities in Ottawa.
