= James Keegstra =

Canadian teacher convicted of promoting hatred (1934–2014)

- Keegstra in 1985

Mayor of Eckville, Alberta
- In office 1974–1983
- Preceded by: Hans Coppens
- Succeeded by: Harold Leach

Acting Leader of the Social Credit Party of Canada
- In office July 27, 1987 – July 28, 1987
- Preceded by: Harvey Lainson
- Succeeded by: Harvey Lainson

Personal details
- Born: March 30, 1934 Vulcan, Alberta, Canada
- Died: June 2, 2014 (aged 80) Red Deer, Alberta, Canada
- Party: Social Credit
- Children: 4
- Occupation: Teacher, mechanic
- Known for: Respondent in R v Keegstra

James "Jim" Keegstra (March 30, 1934 – June 2, 2014) was a public school teacher and mayor in Eckville, Alberta, Canada, who was charged under the Criminal Code with wilful promotion of hatred against an identifiable group, the Jewish people, in 1984. The charge led to lengthy litigation over the next twelve years, including three hearings in the Supreme Court of Canada, with Keegstra arguing that the offence of wilful promotion of hatred infringed his right to freedom of expression under the Canadian Charter of Rights and Freedoms. Ultimately, the Supreme Court upheld the constitutionality of the offence, and Keegstra was convicted.

The events surrounding the charge received substantial international attention. The main Supreme Court decision, R v Keegstra, became a landmark Canadian legal case upholding the constitutionality of the country's hate speech laws.

In addition to the criminal case, Keegstra was dismissed from his teaching position, and his teaching certificate was revoked. He spent the rest of his life farming and working in a custodial position, dying at age 80 in 2014.

== Life ==
Keegstra was born in Vulcan, Alberta, on March 30, 1934, the seventh child to Dutch immigrant parents who were devout members of the Dutch Reformed Church. The family moved around due to poor farming conditions in southern Alberta during the 1930s, eventually settling in Alhambra, Alberta.

Keegstra's parents were strong believers in Premier William Aberhart's social credit views and political party, which strongly aligned with their religious beliefs. Aberhart rallied Albertans behind the cause of C.H. Douglas' social credit theory, which blamed many of the challenges of the Great Depression and society on international bankers. Keegstra followed his parents in his position on social credit, attending Aberhart's Calgary Prophetic Bible Institute and becoming a Social Credit Party member in 1957.

While in Alhambra, Keegstra finished high school in Rocky Mountain House in 1954. He took an interest in auto mechanics and received his trade papers in Carstairs in 1957. Later in 1959, he enrolled at the University of Calgary (then known as the University of Alberta at Calgary) for a Bachelor of Education with a specialization in industrial arts, which he completed in 1967. He took summer courses afterwards in social studies to upgrade his degree. During this time, he was employed as a high school automotive mechanics teacher in Red Deer, from 1963 to 1966, and took on social studies in Medicine Hat in 1966. In Medicine Hat, Keegstra taught social studies "by the book" but found the content was largely "written by socialists". In 1968, after his graduation, he found full-time employment as a general teacher in Eckville. Initially responsible for industry and automotives, he ended up teaching a wide variety of subjects, including social studies.

In Eckville, Keegstra held various community roles: He was a deacon and Sunday school teacher and in 1974 became mayor of the community. He was acclaimed to the position two more times—in 1977 and 1980—serving in the role from 1974 to 1983. As a teacher, he was able to develop strong bonds with male students, often helping them fix their cars, but did not develop strong relationships with female students, as he did not hide his distaste for anything akin to feminism.

Keegstra was fired as a teacher in December 1982. He then farmed with his brother and worked in a custodial position. He died in Red Deer, Alberta, on June 2, 2014, and was survived by four children.

== Court proceedings ==
=== Factual background ===
Keegstra taught social studies in the high school in Eckville. In 1982, it came to light that he was teaching his students that the Holocaust was a fraud and attributing various evil qualities to Jews. He described Jews to his pupils as "treacherous", "subversive", "sadistic", "money-loving", "power hungry", and "child killers". He taught his classes that the Jewish people seek to destroy Christianity and are responsible for depressions, anarchy, chaos, wars, and revolution. According to Keegstra, the Jews "created the Holocaust to gain sympathy" and, in contrast to the open and honest Christians, were said to be deceptive, secretive, and inherently evil. He taught his students the myth of a Jewish world conspiracy whose blueprint allegedly came from the Talmud. Keegstra expected his students to reproduce his teachings in class and on exams. If they failed to do so, their marks suffered.

The way Keegstra taught his students was apparently known to the school principal, who ignored complaints from parents. It was not until the parents lodged a complaint with the school board and went to the local newspaper, the Red Deer Advocate, that the issue became public.

When Keegstra's teachings came to light, he was fired by the school board in December 1982. He was subsequently stripped of his teaching certificate. The issue attracted international media coverage.

In 1983, Keegstra was defeated in his bid for re-election as mayor of Eckville, by a vote of 278 to 123, with a 92 per cent voter turnout. Residents resented the adverse publicity he had brought on the town and felt that he had damaged its reputation.

=== First trial: 1984–1985 ===
In 1984, the Attorney General of Alberta charged Keegstra under the Criminal Code. The allegation was that Keegstra "did unlawfully promote hatred against an identifiable group, to wit: the Jewish people, by communicating statements while teaching to students at Eckville High School contrary to the provisions of the Criminal Code."

At his trial before the Alberta Queen's Bench, Keegstra applied to have this charge quashed. He argued that the Criminal Code offence of promoting hatred against an identifiable group infringed the constitutional guarantee of freedom of expression, set out in section 2 of the Canadian Charter of Rights and Freedoms. The trial judge, Justice Quigley, ruled against him. He held that the offence did not infringe freedom of expression, as the promotion of hatred was not the kind of expression that section 2 was designed to protect. In the alternative, if he was wrong on that point, he concluded that the infringement was justified under section 1 of the Charter.

The matter then went to trial, which lasted 70 days. Many of Keegstra's former students testified against him. In the end, the jury convicted him of the charge, and the court fined him $5,000.

In 1985, he sought and won an injunction against the broadcast of Oakmount High, a CBC Television film about an antisemitic teacher that had similarities to Keegstra's case, on the grounds that its broadcast would prejudice his chance at a fair appeal of his conviction.

=== First appeal: 1988 ===
Keegstra took his conviction to the Court of Appeal of Alberta, again arguing that the criminal offence violated the Charter's guarantee of freedom of expression.

He also brought a new challenge, relating to the defence of truth. The Criminal Code provided that it was a defence to the charge if the statements alleged to have been said were true. However, the onus was on the accused person to prove the truth of the statements, on a balance of probabilities. Keegstra argued that this reverse onus violated the presumption of innocence guaranteed by section 11(d) of the Charter. He admitted he was not able to prove the truth of the many antisemitic statements he had made to his students. In the CBC News presentation Canada's Hate Law: The Keegstra Case (1991), Keegstra displayed the material in which his views were obtained, admitting that none of it came from mainstream historical sources.

The Court of Appeal ruled in Keegstra's favour on the constitutional issues. The unanimous three-judge panel found that the criminal offence infringed freedom of expression and could not be justified under section 1 of the Charter. They also found that the reverse onus violated the presumption of innocence and could not be justified under section 1.

=== First appeal to the Supreme Court: 1990 ===
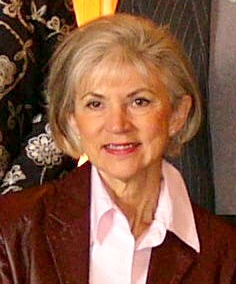
Justice McLachlin, who dissented and would have found the offence unconstitutional

The Crown then appealed to the Supreme Court of Canada. In its decision in R v Keegstra in 1990, the Supreme Court set aside the ruling of the Alberta Court of Appeal. By a 4–3 majority, the Supreme Court held that the Criminal Code offence of wilfully promoting hatred was constitutional, on both the issue of freedom of expression and that of reverse onus.

==== Freedom of expression ====
Speaking for the majority, Chief Justice Brian Dickson agreed that the provision infringed freedom of expression. He did not agree with the Alberta Queen's Bench conclusion that some types of expression were not within the meaning of this guarantee. However, he concluded that the offence nonetheless was justified under section 1 of the Charter. He held that Parliament's goal was to "prevent the pain suffered by target group members and to reduce racial, ethnic and religious tension and perhaps even violence in Canada." He also referred to historical precedents where hate speech had triggered violence. As well, he held that the offence was carefully tailored to Parliament's concern and that "hatred" captures "only the most severe and deeply felt form of opprobrium". As a result, the offence did not infringe the Charter.

Justice Beverley McLachlin dissented, for herself and two other judges. She agreed with Dickson that the offence infringed the guarantee of freedom of association, but she disagreed with him on the question of justification under section 1 of the Charter. She held that the offence was drafted too broadly, and the undefined nature of the term "hatred" was problematic. She concluded that the offence was not proportional to the effect it had on freedom of expression, and therefore could not be upheld under section 1.

==== Reverse onus ====
The same 4–3 split occurred on the issue of the reverse onus with respect to proving the truth of the statements. Both Dickson and McLachlin agreed that the reverse onus infringed the presumption of innocence. However, Dickson held that the reverse onus was justified under section 1, in the overall context of the offence. McLachlin disagreed and would have held that the presumption was not justifiable under section 1.

==== Remand to the Court of Appeal ====
Having upheld the constitutionality of the offence provisions, the Court remanded the case to the Alberta Court of Appeal to deal with the other issues that Keegstra had raised in his appeal, but which that court had not dealt with, in light of its constitutional ruling in Keegstra's favour.

=== Sentencing ===
At his original trial, Keegstra was given a fine of $5,000. A subsequent decision by the Alberta Court of Appeal reduced that to a one-year suspended sentence, one year of probation, and 200 hours of community service work. While the Supreme Court upheld the original conviction and the constitutionality of the law, they did not restore the original sentence.

== Social Credit Party ==
Keegstra was a longtime activist in the Social Credit Party of Canada and was a candidate for the party in Red Deer in the 1972, 1974, and 1984 federal elections, coming in last place in each attempt.

In 1983, Social Credit leader Martin Hattersley suspended Keegstra's membership and tried to expel him because of his antisemitic activism. When the party voted to reinstate Keegstra, Hattersley resigned, saying, "I simply cannot be leader of a party that has people accepted into its ranks that publicly express views of that sort."

In 1986, Keegstra ran unsuccessfully for the party's leadership with the support of white supremacist Don Andrews and Holocaust denier Ernst Zündel. He lost by 67 votes to 38 to Harvey Lainson, an evangelical minister from Ontario. Keegstra was elected as the party's acting leader on July 27, 1987, after the party's national executive ousted Lainson over his call to rename the party "Christian Freedom". Lainson refused to relinquish the leadership, and Keegstra was expelled from the Social Credit Party and its successor, the Christian Freedom Social Credit Party, in September.

== See also ==
- Doug Christie (lawyer) – Keegstra's lawyer, politician, and far-right activist
- Malcolm Ross (school teacher) – Canadian teacher found liable under human rights legislation for discriminating against Jewish students
