= Réal Caouette =

Canadian politician (1917–1976)

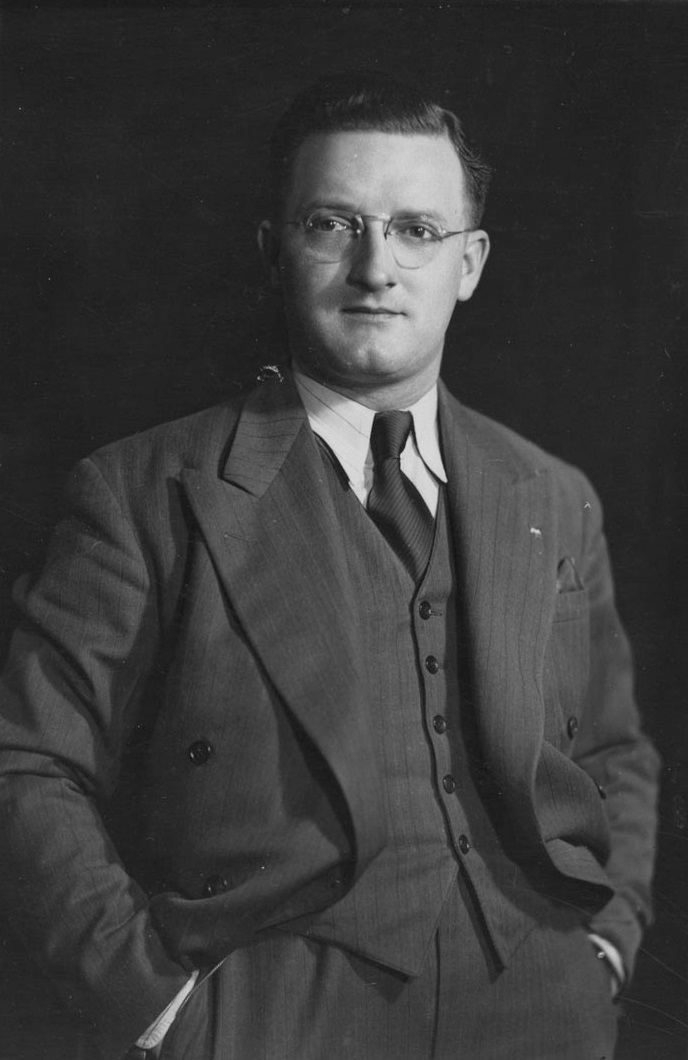
- Caouette in 1945

Leader of the Social Credit Party of Canada
- In office October 9, 1971 – November 7, 1976
- Preceded by: Alexander Bell Patterson (acting)
- Succeeded by: André-Gilles Fortin

Leader of the Ralliement créditiste
- In office September 1, 1963 – October 9, 1971
- Preceded by: Position established
- Succeeded by: himself (as Leader of the Social Credit Party of Canada)

Member of Parliament for Témiscamingue (Villeneuve; 1962–1968)
- In office June 18, 1962 – December 16, 1976
- Preceded by: Armand Dumas
- Succeeded by: Gilles Caouette (1977)

Member of Parliament for Pontiac
- In office September 16, 1946 – June 27, 1949
- Preceded by: Wallace McDonald
- Succeeded by: Armand Dumas (Villeneuve)

Personal details
- Born: David Réal Caouette; September 26, 1917 Amos, Quebec, Canada
- Died: December 16, 1976 (aged 59) Ottawa, Ontario, Canada
- Party: Social Credit Party of Canada (1946–1963, 1971–1976), Ralliement créditiste (1963–1971)
- Other political affiliations: Union des electeurs (1945–1957), Candidat des électeurs (1957–1958), Quebec Liberal Party (1956)
- Children: Gilles Caouette others unknown
- Occupation: Politician; Automobile dealer; insurance manager; journalist

David Réal Caouette (French pronunciation: [david ʁeal kawɛt]; September 26, 1917 – December 16, 1976) was a Canadian politician from Quebec. He was a Member of Parliament (MP) and leader of the Social Credit Party of Canada and founder of the Ralliement des créditistes. Outside politics he worked as a car dealer.

His son, Gilles Caouette, was also a Social Credit MP and was briefly acting leader of the party.

== Early political career ==
Caouette was born in Amos, in the Abitibi region of Quebec, the son of Marie (Cloutier) and Samuel Caouette. Caouette was converted to the social credit philosophy in 1939.

He was first elected to the House of Commons of Canada in a 1946 by-election in Pontiac for the Union des électeurs, a pro-Social Credit group in Quebec. He sat as a Social Credit MP once elected. In the 1949 election, his home was drawn into the newly created Villeneuve, and he was defeated as a Union des électeurs candidate.

== Out of Parliament ==
He ran again in the 1953, 1957 and 1958 elections, but was unsuccessful each time. He also ran provincially, for the Quebec Liberal Party, in the 1956 provincial election but was defeated. In 1958, he broke with Union des électeurs founders Louis Even and Gilberte Côté-Mercier, and joined Social Credit forming Ralliement des créditistes as the national party's Quebec wing of which he became the uncontested leader.

== Leadership defeat ==
In 1961, he ran for leadership of the Social Credit Party, which had no federal representation at the time following the 1958 election, but lost to the party's president, Robert N. Thompson of Alberta. The totals were never released.

Caouette later claimed that on paper, he would have had enough support to win but for Alberta Premier Ernest Manning's intervention in favour of Thompson. According to Caouette, Manning told the Quebec delegates to vote for Thompson because Western Socreds would never accept a Francophone Catholic as party leader.

== Breakthrough ==
In the 1962 election, Social Credit won 26 seats in Québec, led by Caouette, who returned as the member for Villeneuve. He held this seat until 1968, when he transferred to the newly created Témiscamingue, a riding he would hold for the rest of his life. The party won only four seats in the rest of Canada. Under the circumstances, Thompson, now the MP for Red Deer, was all but forced to name Caouette as the party's deputy leader. Holding the balance of power in the House of Commons of Canada, Social Credit helped bring down the Progressive Conservative minority government of John Diefenbaker. However, in the 1963 election, Social Credit was reduced to 24 seats nationwide, all but four of which were in Quebec.

Caouette fought for bilingualism in the House of Commons, winning a symbolic victory when he got the Parliament's restaurant to produce bilingual menus. In this, he anticipated the official bilingualism policy that Pierre Trudeau's government would later enact.

The Socred MPs from Québec considered Caouette as their true leader. Over time, Caouette came to believe that since the party was most successful in Québec, he should be the leader of the party instead of Thompson. As well, Caouette and his followers remained true believers in the social credit monetary theories of C. H. Douglas while Thompson and the party's two most powerful branches—in Alberta and British Columbia—had largely abandoned the theory. Thompson refused to step aside, prompting Caouette and virtually all of the Socred MPs from Quebec to split from the party in 1963 and establish the Ralliement des créditistes as a separate political party.

In the 1965 election, Caouette's Ralliement won nine seats, while Social Credit led by Thompson won five seats. In the 1968 election, Caouette's party won 14 seats while Social Credit won none.

The two parties were reunited under Caouette's leadership for the 1972 election. The reunited Socreds won 15 seats in that election, all in Québec. It would never elect another MP from English Canada, though it continued to nominate candidates outside of Québec.

== Later political career ==
In the 1974 federal election, the Social Credit Party machine in Québec was wracked by internal divisions. Caouette was suffering from a snowmobiling accident, and therefore the powerful voice that had carried Social Credit in prior elections was silenced. When he was able to speak, Caouette focussed his attacks on the Progressive Conservatives and the New Democratic Party, instead of the Liberal Party, which was Social Credit's main competitor in Québec. Two weeks before the election was called, Caouette had informed the parliamentary caucus that he would resign as leader in the fall. Despite the party infighting, they managed 11 seats. Though this was one seat short of official status, the Speaker of the House of Commons agreed to recognize them as a party.

The decline of the party accelerated after Caouette resigned from the party leadership in 1976. Caouette had announced in 1975 that he would step down from the leadership within a year. He was hospitalized after a stroke on September 16, and died three months later.

After his death in 1976, Social Credit went into decline both in Québec and at the federal level. The party fell to only six seats under Fabien Roy in the 1979 election. It was shut out of Parliament altogether in 1980, never to return. The party eventually folded in 1993.

== Political views ==
Caouette mixed Social Credit's traditional social conservatism with ardent Québec nationalism. A populist leader and charismatic speaker, Caouette appealed to those who felt left out and pushed aside by financial institutions, traditional politicians, and what they perceived as elitist intellectuals.

Throughout the course of his career, Caouette was known for making controversial and intemperate statements. Shortly after World War II, Caouette claimed that his economic theories were the same as those of Benito Mussolini's government in Italy, and said that Mussolini and Adolf Hitler were his political heroes. During the October Crisis of 1970, he also claimed that leaders of the Marxist Front de libération du Québec, which precipitated the October Crisis, should be shot by a firing squad. While such statements may have resonated with Créditiste supporters, they impaired the party's popularity with the mainstream electorate.

"The disdain for outsiders always seemed to fit conveniently with the theory of conspiracy of the old parties. The Jews were another and equally convenient part of the Creditiste demonology and there was a continuing strain of anti-Semitism. After the 1962 triumph, Caouette revealed that his political heroes were Hitler and Mussolini. As late as a few years ago, his bookshelves contained The Protocols of the Elders of Zion ... If non-Creditistes were horrified, the loyalists did not seem to care."—John Gray

== Election results ==
Canadian federal by-election, 16 September 1946: Pontiac
Party	Candidate	Votes	%	±%
On Mr. McDonald's death, 2 May 1946
Social Credit	Réal Caouette	11,412	35.86	+17.68
Liberal	Lucien Labelle	10,379	32.61	-8.77
Progressive Conservative	Hector-Émile Bélec	7,487	23.53	+4.47
Unknown	Bernard Molloy	1,975	6.21	
Unknown	Oscar Roy	572	1.80	
Total valid votes		31,825	100.00	

1949 Canadian federal election
Party	Candidate	Votes
Liberal	Armand Dumas	13,597
Union des électeurs	Réal Caouette	10,980
Progressive Conservative	Louis-Charles Trempe	958
Independent PC	Henri-L. Devost	291
Independent Liberal	François-Xavier Généreux	102

1957 Canadian federal election
Party	Candidate	Votes
Liberal	Armand Dumas	9,893
Candidat des électeurs	Réal Caouette	8,129
Progressive Conservative	André Lemieux	6,034
Co-operative Commonwealth	Thérèse-F. Casgrain	1,947

1958 Canadian federal election
Party	Candidate	Votes
Liberal	Armand Dumas	10,102
Progressive Conservative	André Lemieux	9,811
Candidat des électeurs	Réal Caouette	8,276
Co-operative Commonwealth	Yvon Parent	662

1962 Canadian federal election
Party	Candidate	Votes
Social Credit	Réal Caouette	21,022
Liberal	L.-D. Pilon	6,831
Progressive Conservative	Marc Cloutier	2,441
New Democratic	Jean-Paul Bonneau	981

1963 Canadian federal election
Party	Candidate	Votes
Social Credit	Réal Caouette	18,096
Liberal	Stephen Cuddihy	7,270
New Democratic	Roger Bédard	2,279
Progressive Conservative	Marc Cloutier	2,235

1965 Canadian federal election
Party	Candidate	Votes
Ralliement créditiste	Réal Caouette	19,839
Liberal	Joseph Morin	5,397
Progressive Conservative	J.-O.-Raymond Rochon	1,924
New Democratic	Clermont Nadeau	1,496

== See also ==
- Politics of Québec
- List of Québec general elections
- Timeline of Québec history

== Archives ==
There is a Réal Caouette fonds at Library and Archives Canada. Archival reference number is R7439.

Preceded by none	Leader of Ralliement des créditistes 1958–1971	Succeeded by merged into Social Credit Party of Canada
