= Bibeau =

Bibeau is a surname of French origin. Notable people with the surname include:

- Antoine Bibeau (born 1994), Canadian professional ice hockey goaltender
- Marie Bibeau (1865–1924), first Superior General of the Little Franciscans of Mary
- Marie-Claude Bibeau (born 1970), Canadian politician
- Michael Zehaf-Bibeau (1982–2014) (aka Joseph Paul Michael Bibeau), the perpetrator of the 2014 shootings at Parliament Hill, Ottawa
- Ray Bibeau, Canadian ice hockey player
- Rénald Bibeau, Canadian politician
