= Concession Street =

Road in Hamilton, Ontario, Canada

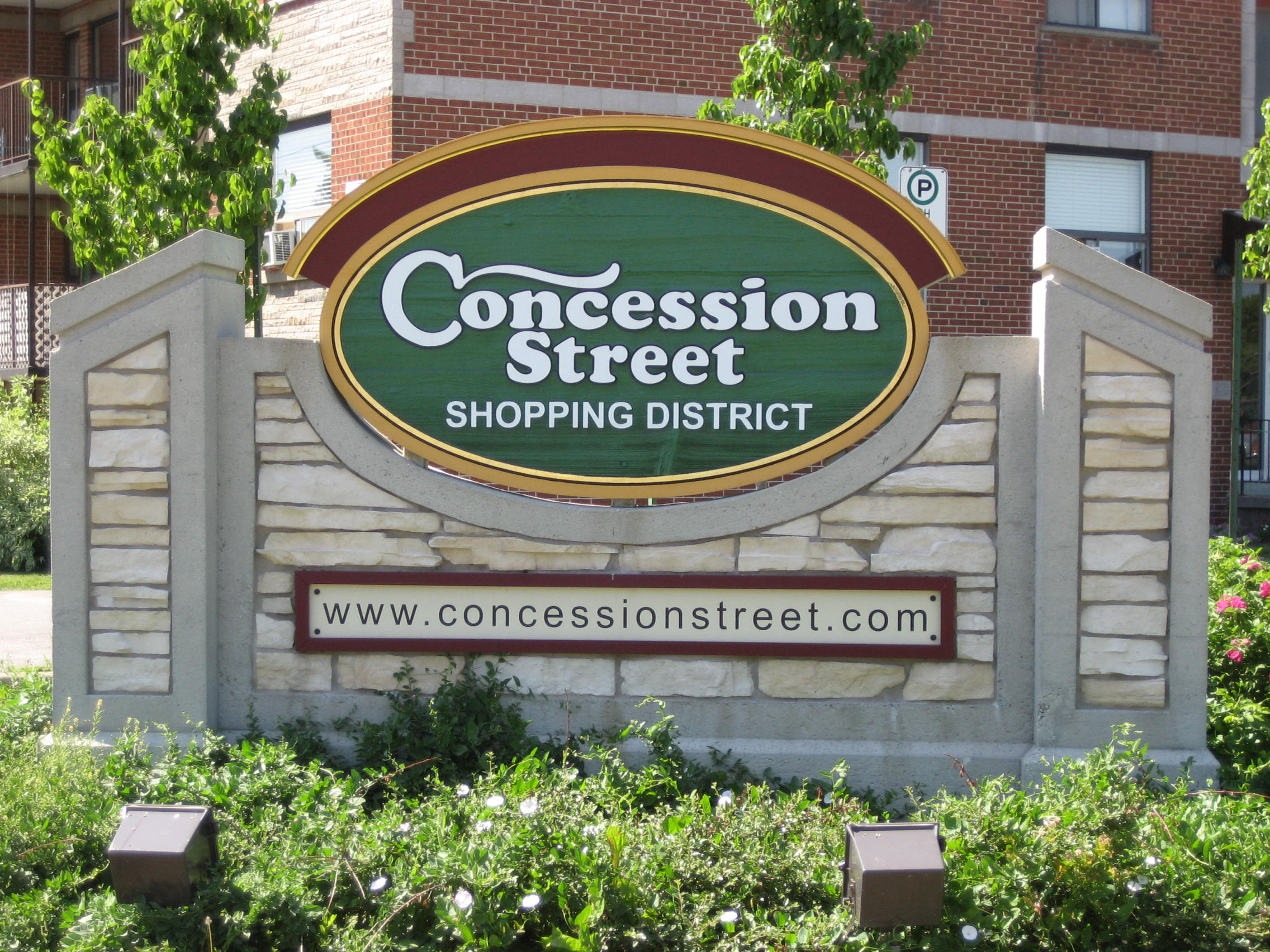

Concession Street is an Upper City (mountain) arterial road in Hamilton, Ontario, Canada. It starts at Belvidere Avenue, just west of Sam Lawrence Park, and extends eastward past Mountain Drive Park on Upper Gage Avenue and ends shortly thereafter at East 43rd Street.

Note: East of East 43rd Street the road is known as Mountain Brow Boulevard.

== History ==
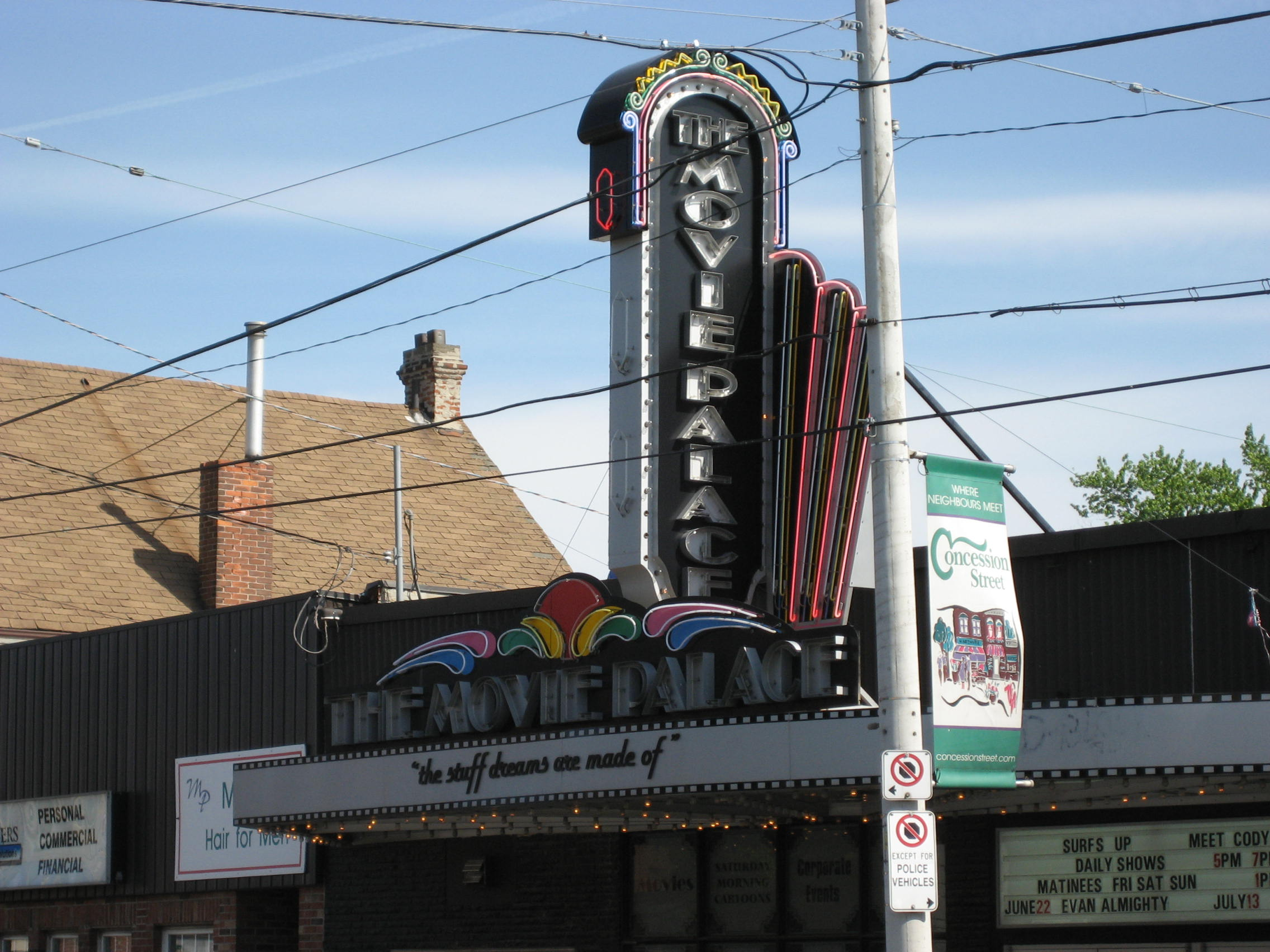
Concession Street landmark

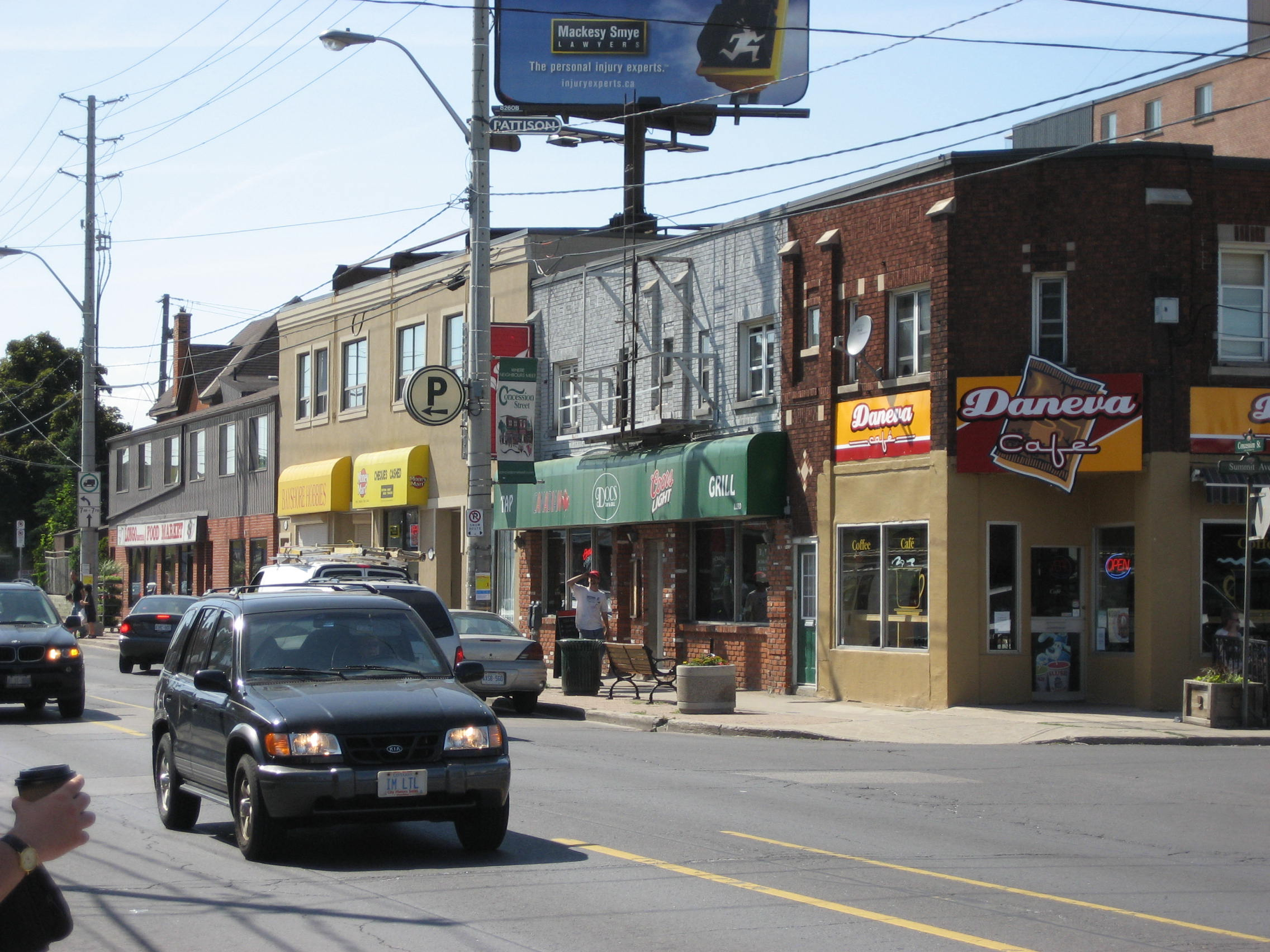
Street activity

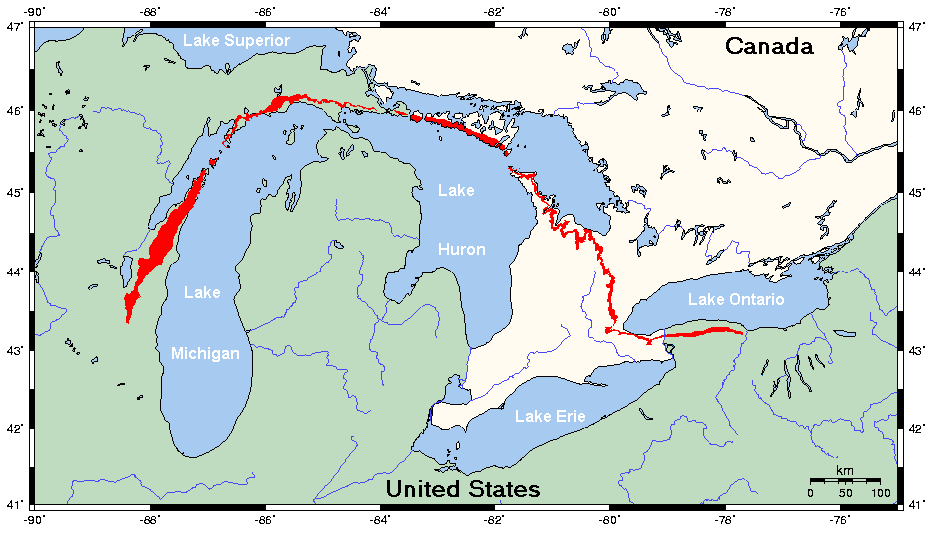
Niagara Escarpment (in red)

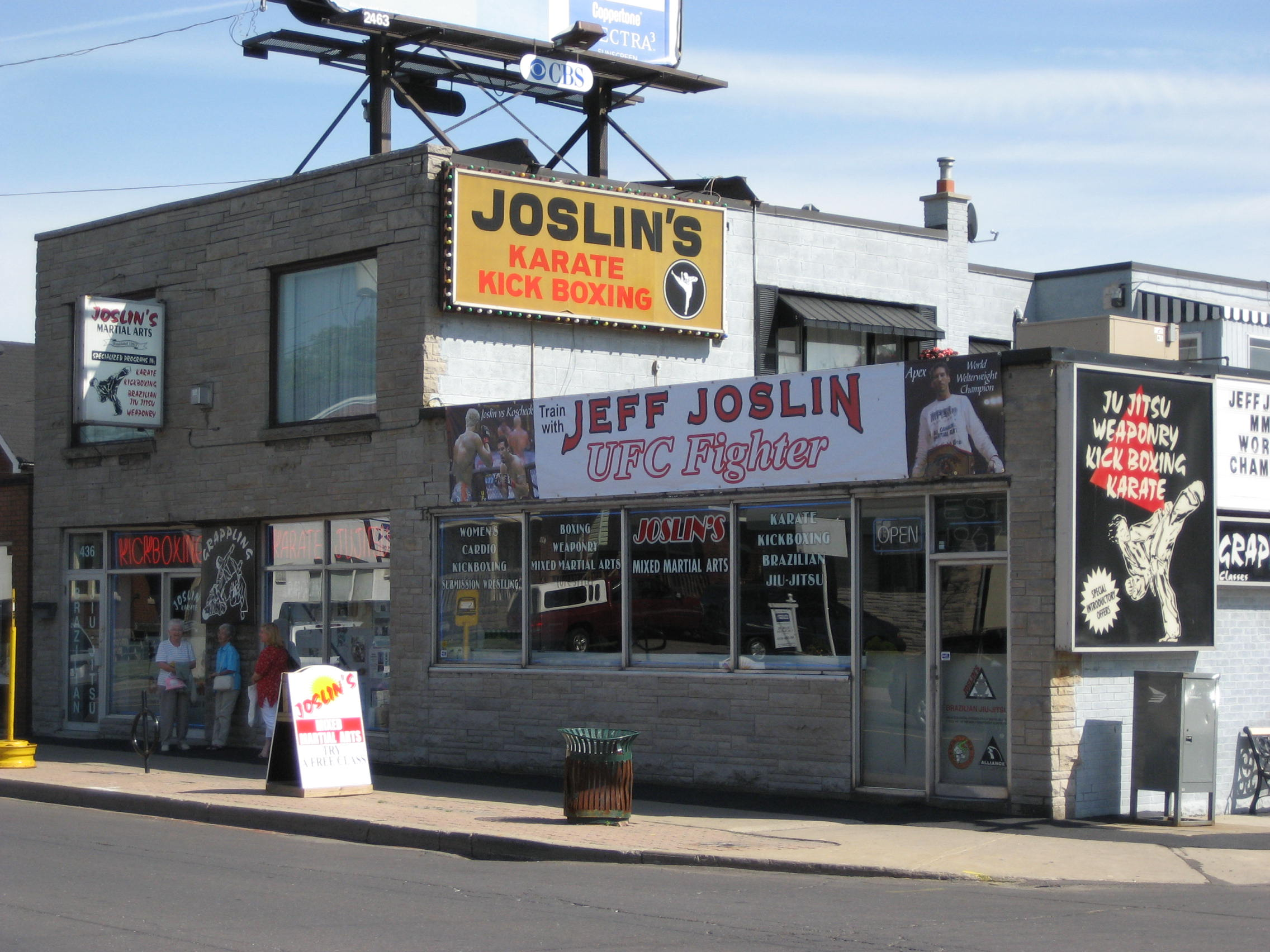
Concession Street landmark

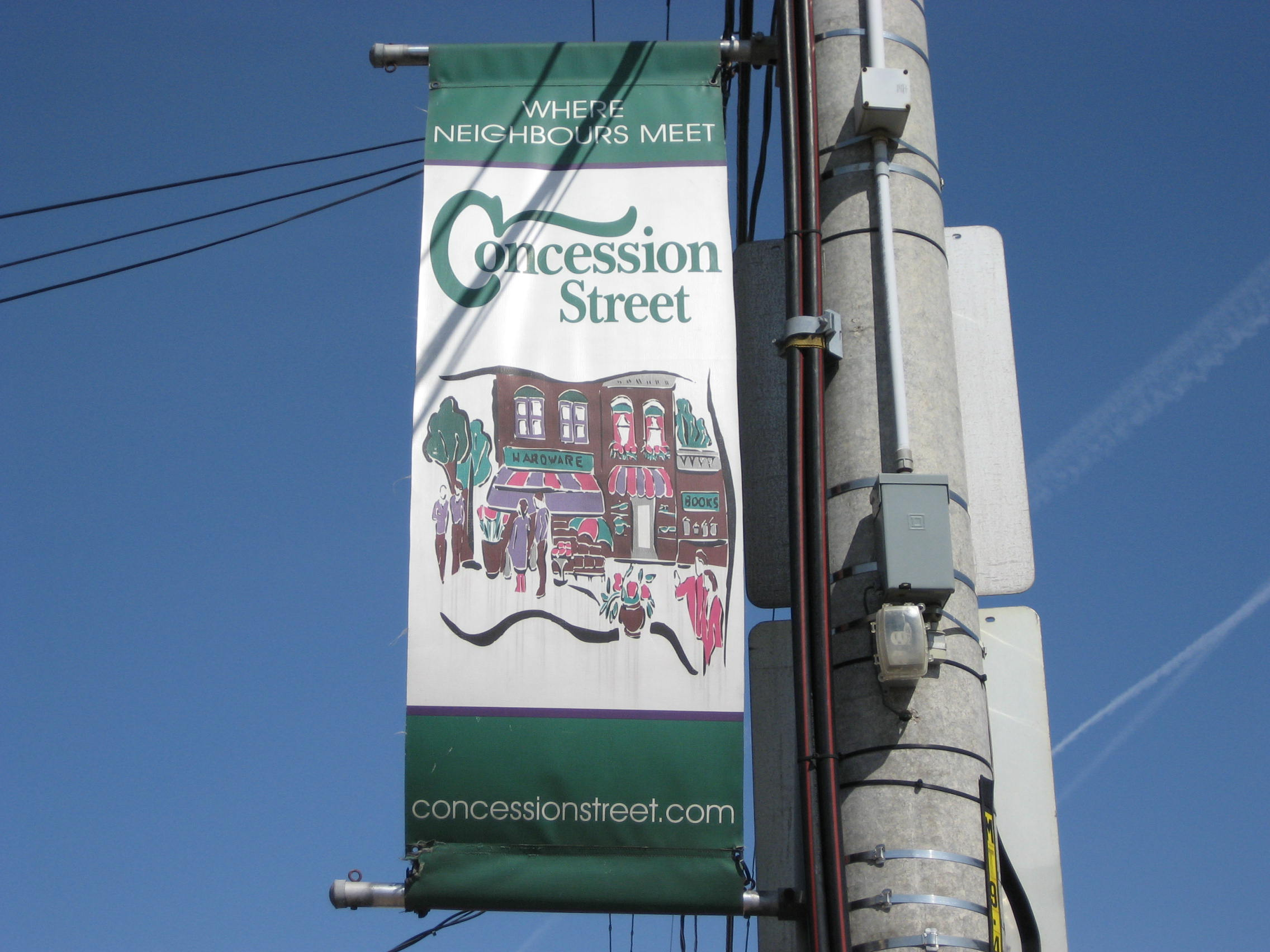
Concession Street banner

Originally known as Stone Road and changed to Concession Street in 1909. As well, the Hamilton mountain was a separate community from the Lower city Hamilton and known as "Mount Hamilton" but by 1891, properties north of Concession Street were annexed by the city of Hamilton and were serviced with water, sewers and sidewalks. Note: Aberdeen Avenue in the Lower City was originally known as Concession Street.

Concession Street is the oldest settlement area on the Hamilton mountain. It was once an African American neighbourhood settled by slaves escaping the U.S. via the Underground Railroad. This part of Hamilton Mountain was then known as "Little Africa". Canada in general and Hamilton in particular received these refugees with great sympathy and understanding. They were illiterate and took up education in the "Mission", a union church and school building, erected in 1860. The Union Mission was situated on the south-side of Concession between Twenty-Second and Twenty Third Streets. The adults would sit in with the children and spell out words and hoped that they might some day be able to read the Bible. They also liked to display pictures of Queen Victoria alongside that of Abraham Lincoln. They also took on new surnames to avoid being identified and recaptured. Many of the families there favoured the name "Johnson" as well as "Atkins", "Murdoch" and "Green". Over the years these families abandoned the homes they had established, to be seen no more on the hilltop. They didn't like the long cold winters and eventually returned to the United States.

During the 19th century it did not occur to inhabitants of Hamilton that the mountain top would become thickly populated. Concession Street had been a deer run, then a cow path, at last evolved into a stoned road and had a toll-gate placed on it. All other roads on the mountain were left in a state of nature, where wagons sank to the hubs in the sticky mud for which Barton Township was famous.

From the year 1910, (interrupted by the outbreak of World War I in 1914), a great building boom was enjoyed on the mountain area, when many farms were cut into lots and many streets opened. Immigration flowed and the newcomers were chiefly from the British Isles. They were industrious workingmen who soon built comfortable homes for themselves. When the city water came to the mountain, followed by sewers, there was no restraint on the building program.

In 1949, Mayor Sam Lawrence went on record as favouring a separate mountain ward. The city's focus was now to grow south with the eastern boundary, at the time, now established at Red Hill Creek.

=== Transportation infrastructure ===
The Jolley Cut (named after James Jolley, (1813–1892), saddler, harnessmaker, politician), is a mountain/lower city-access road in Hamilton. James Jolley funded construction of the Jolley Cut.

It was not unusual for the mountain settler in those days to undertake the construction of a road down the face of the escarpment, known as a short-cut, which might be used only by the family who constructed it or might open to the public. At the west end they had the Fillman Mountain, the Horning Mountain and later Beckett's Drive — all done by hand labour. Eventually both Fillman & Horning Mountains fell to disuse because they were dangerously too steep.

One time the city even considered adding a streetcar route on the mountain like they had done with the lower city. (Note: When street railway lines were at its peak in Hamilton there was a total of 27.97 miles of railway lines employed by the HSR.) In 1913, promoters of the Civic Improvement Society, composed of mountain township men, stated that, 'if a street railway were run on the mountain then the area would grow rapidly.' They never got their wish. They also stated at the time that 'the mountain was lacking adequate garbage collection, water supply and a sewage system'. Electric street lighting was another issue of the day as the only lighting they were getting were from city lights coming in from lower city Hamilton.

In 1924 the city of Hamilton agreed to add more street lights to the mountain in an area bounded by Fennell Avenue (south), the escarpment (north), Ontario Hospital on West 5th Street (west) and Upper Gage Avenue (east). Street lights on every second pole.

In 1927 the HSR seriously considered adding a bus route on the Hamilton Mountain and taking advantage of a proposed mountain road which would extend from James Street South to a point 400 feet east of Ferguson Avenue. The road was being considered because the grade would be much smaller per cent than the Jolley Cut and cars would be able to negotiate the journey from the bottom to the top with less difficulty. Permission had to be obtained from the Department of Highways if the Hamilton buses were to pass Concession Street. The city limits in 1927 only extended as far as the sidewalk on the southside of Concession, and all of the roadways past that point would come under jurisdiction of the provincial highways department, which at the time, did not encourage competition between two bus companies when one gave adequate service.

=== Incline railway ===
When the incline railways were running tourists did not consider it a trip to Hamilton complete until they had taken the jaunt to the top of one of these railways and looked down on the enchanting scene from an elevation of 285 feet. James Street, at the base of the Niagara Escarpment (mountain) was the site of the city's first incline railway (1892–1932). Back then, the incline railway on James Street was known as the Hamilton & Barton Incline Railway. The city's second incline railway on Wentworth Street South, (1895–1936), was known as the Eastend Incline Railway but was often called, The Mount Hamilton Incline Railway. The Eastend Incline on Wentworth Street was electrically operated and the Westend Incline on James Street depended on steam for its power.

In 1924, following the city's booming development in the east, there was some serious discussion regarding the addition of a third incline railway. The 2 locations be considered at the time were Sherman Avenue or Ottawa Street South. The population of Hamilton Mountain at the time was 6,000.

In 1929, the city's brochures were using the motto, "The City Beautiful and Hub of Canadian Highways" as well as "The City of Opportunity". In regards to the incline railways, the brochures go on to boast, "There is no finer view anywhere on the North American continent than the panorama to be seen from the Hamilton mountain. The city below, the blue waters of Hamilton harbour and Lake Ontario. In the background, flanked on the east by the famous Niagara Fruit District and on the west by the beautiful Dundas Valley and a range of hills, combine to make a picture no artist could paint. There are several roads leading up to the summit and you can drive upon 'high', but if you want to enjoy a unique experience and give the family a thrill, drive your car onto one of the incline railways and you will have something to tell the folks about when you go back home."

In 1949 there was a petition going around town to help revive the Eastend incline, with no success. It was estimated that year 2,000 people used the Wentworth mountain stairs on a daily basis between the hours of 6 in the morning and 6 pm. Proponents of the incline argued that an elevator 'would take passengers and baby carriages to the top of Hamilton mountain and back' plus 'school children took the bus because they couldn't carry their bicycles up the steps'. The reason attributed for its closure in 1936 was the falling off in the numbers using it, due to the depression, and the depreciation of its rolling stock.

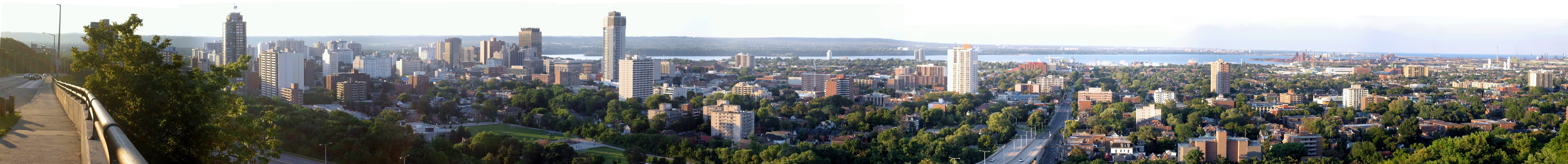
Panoramic view of lower Hamilton from Sam Lawrence Park near Concession Street.

== Sam Lawrence Park ==
Sam Lawrence Park, one of the parks in the City of Hamilton's Parks system, is 6 hectares (14.85 Acres) in size, and composed of three sections surrounding the Jolley Cut roadway. Located on the brow of the Niagara Escarpment, the park offers visitors views of the lower city, Hamilton harbour, and the Dundas Valley. Sam Lawrence Park can be found on the western-end of Concession Street. Prior to 1944, this property was the Webb Quarry. In February 1944, The City of Hamilton was given 3 acres (12,000 m^{2}) of land for park use by Thomas Hambly Ross, MP (Hamilton East), and his wife Olive. The park was originally named Ross Park, then renamed Patton Park in 1946, in honour of captain John MacMillan Stevenson Patton, a Hamiltonian who risked his life during World War II by detonating an unexploded bomb. For this exploit he received the first George Cross for Valour. In 1960, the park was renamed to honour Sam Lawrence. During 1990 to 1994, Sam Lawrence Park underwent a major upgrading that included repairing the stone walls, installing new walkways, site lighting, site furniture, and the redevelopment of the major rock gardens.

The shelter at Sam Lawrence Park was built in 1956 on the existing foundations of the old water tank that used to service this part of the mountain. The stone walls, flower gardens, and pathways were originally constructed in the 1950s and 1960s under the direction of K. Matt Broman, the landscape architect who also supervised the development of the Rock Gardens at the Royal Botanical Gardens.

== Juravinski Hospital and Cancer Centre ==
The Henderson General Hospital, now named the Juravinski Hospital and Cancer Centre, got its name in 1954 when it was named after Nora-Francis Henderson who was the first woman on Hamilton City Council and also the first city controller in Canada. She was also a journalist and activist who pushed for children's and women's rights and health care. The hospital underwent major renovations and expansion and was renamed the Juravinski Hospital and Cancer Centre, (after Charles Juravinski and his wife Margaret), after they both made a $43-million contribution to health care in Hamilton. Charles Juravinski sold Flamboro Downs racetrack (Canada's fastest half-mile harness horse racing track) in 2002 and chose to share the money with Hamilton city hospitals. The new hospital will have a Henderson wing.

== Major intersections ==
Note: Listing of streets from west to east.

- Upper Wellington Street
- Upper Wentworth Street
- Upper Sherman Avenue
- Upper Gage Avenue

== Gallery ==
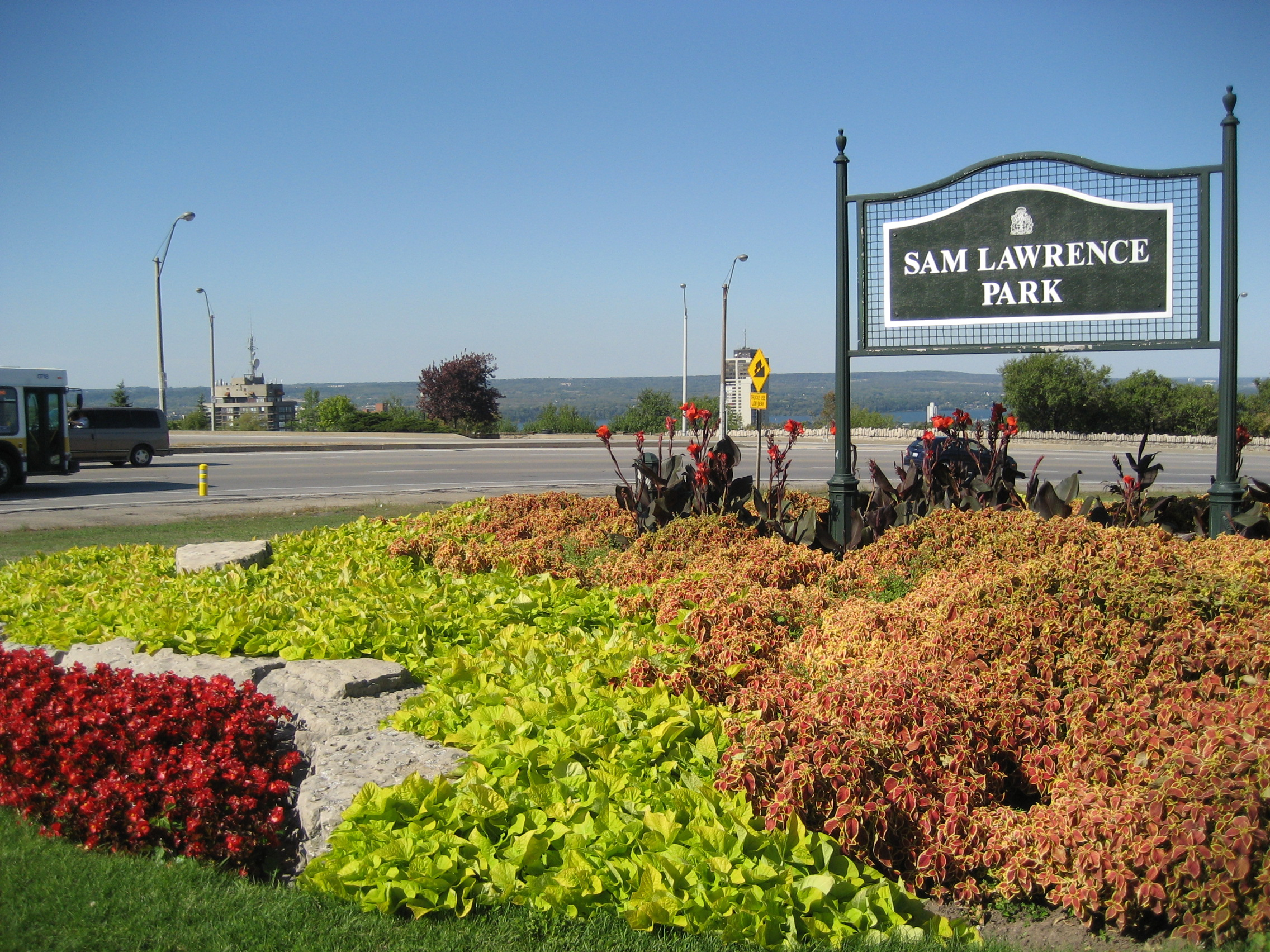
Sam Lawrence Park

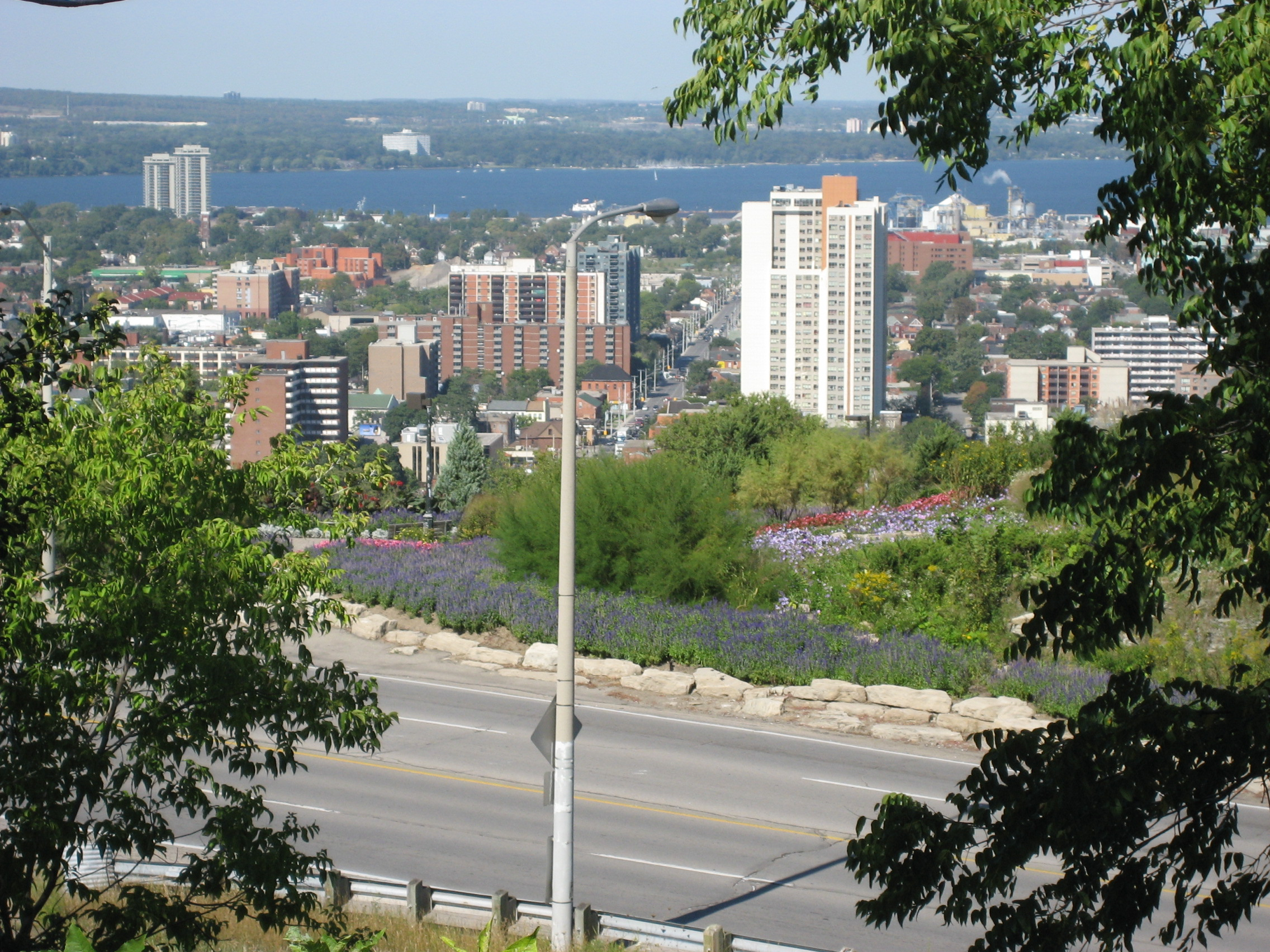
Sam Lawrence Park

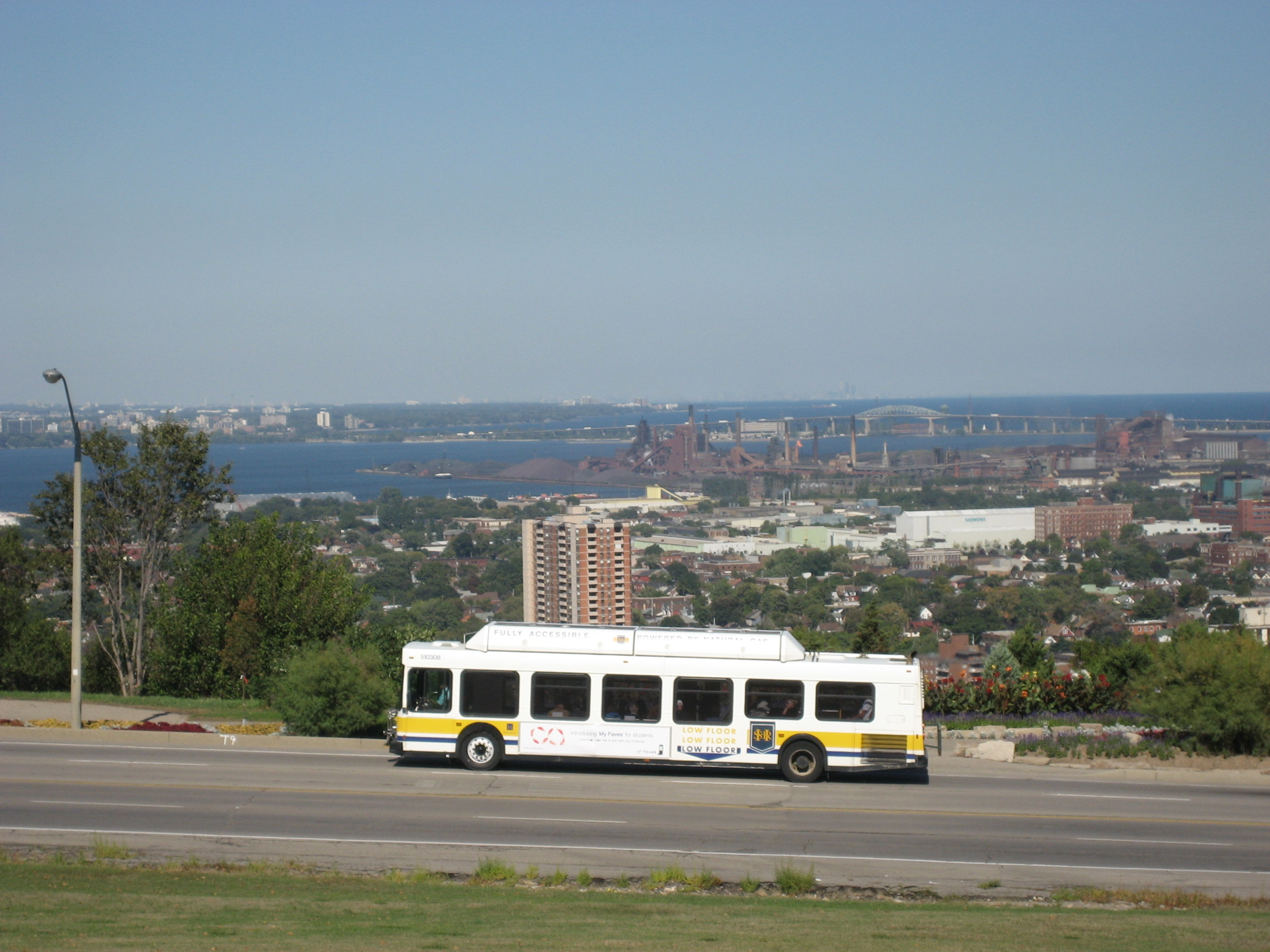
Sam Lawrence Park

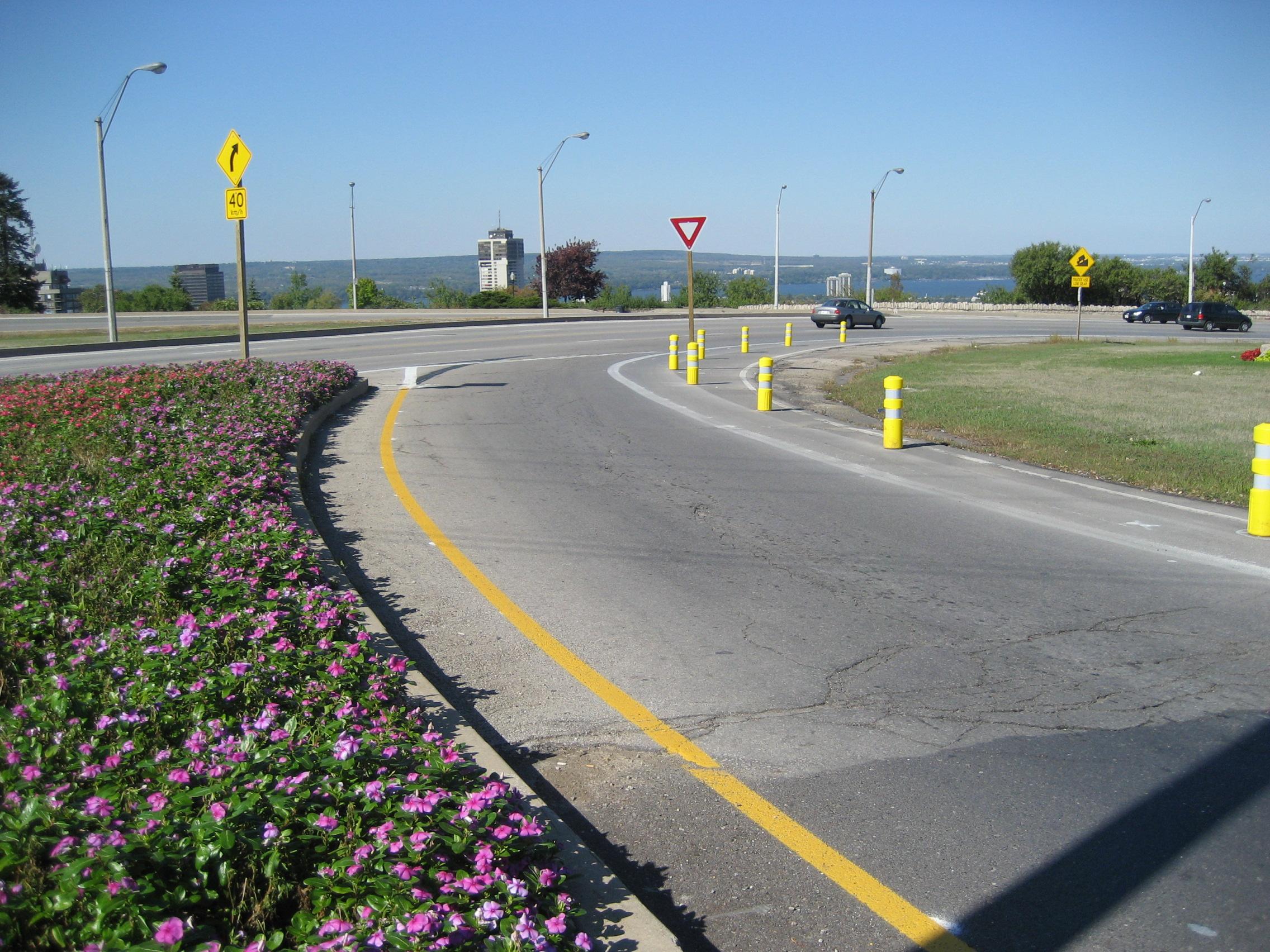
Sam Lawrence Park

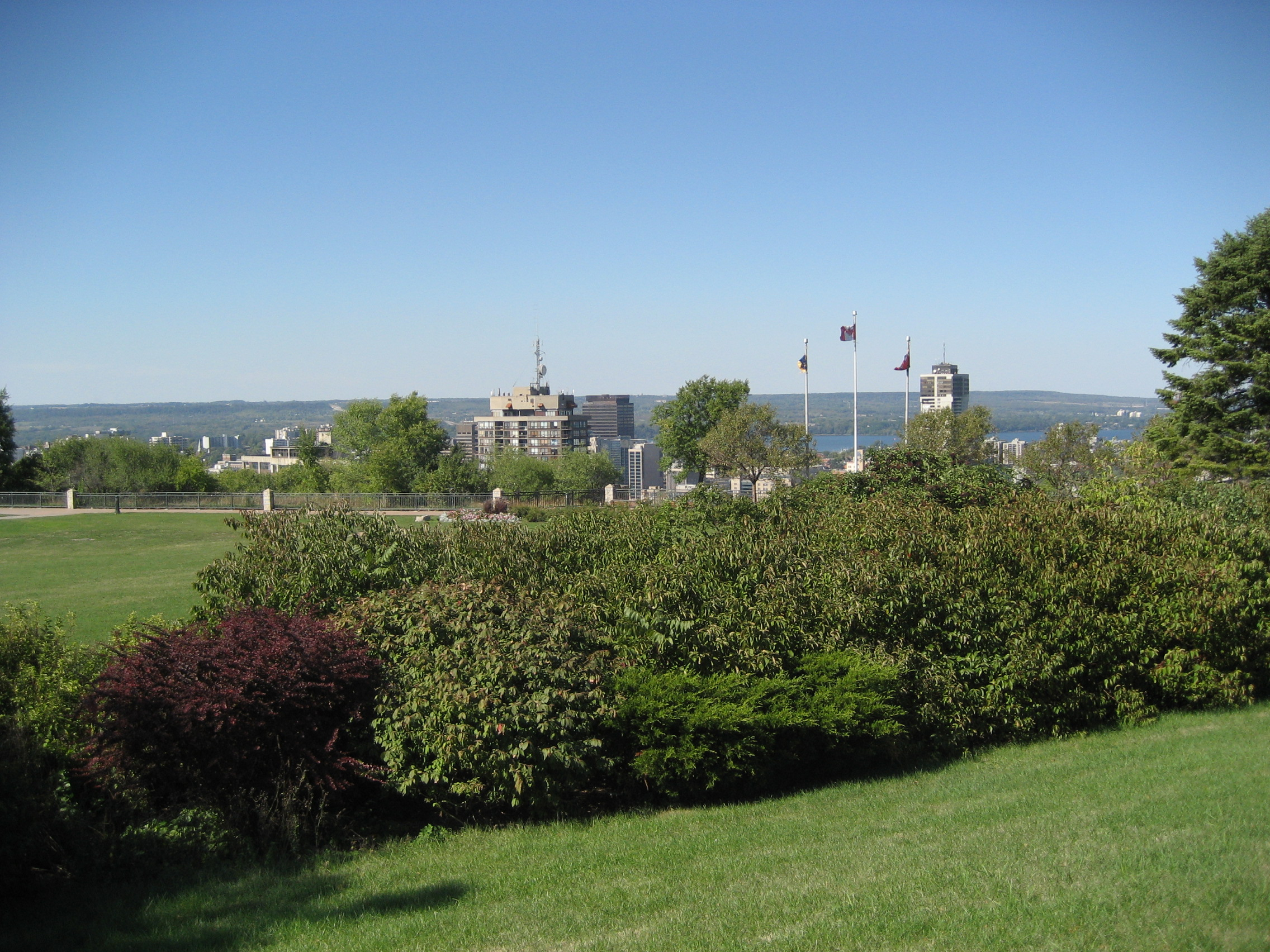
Sam Lawrence Park

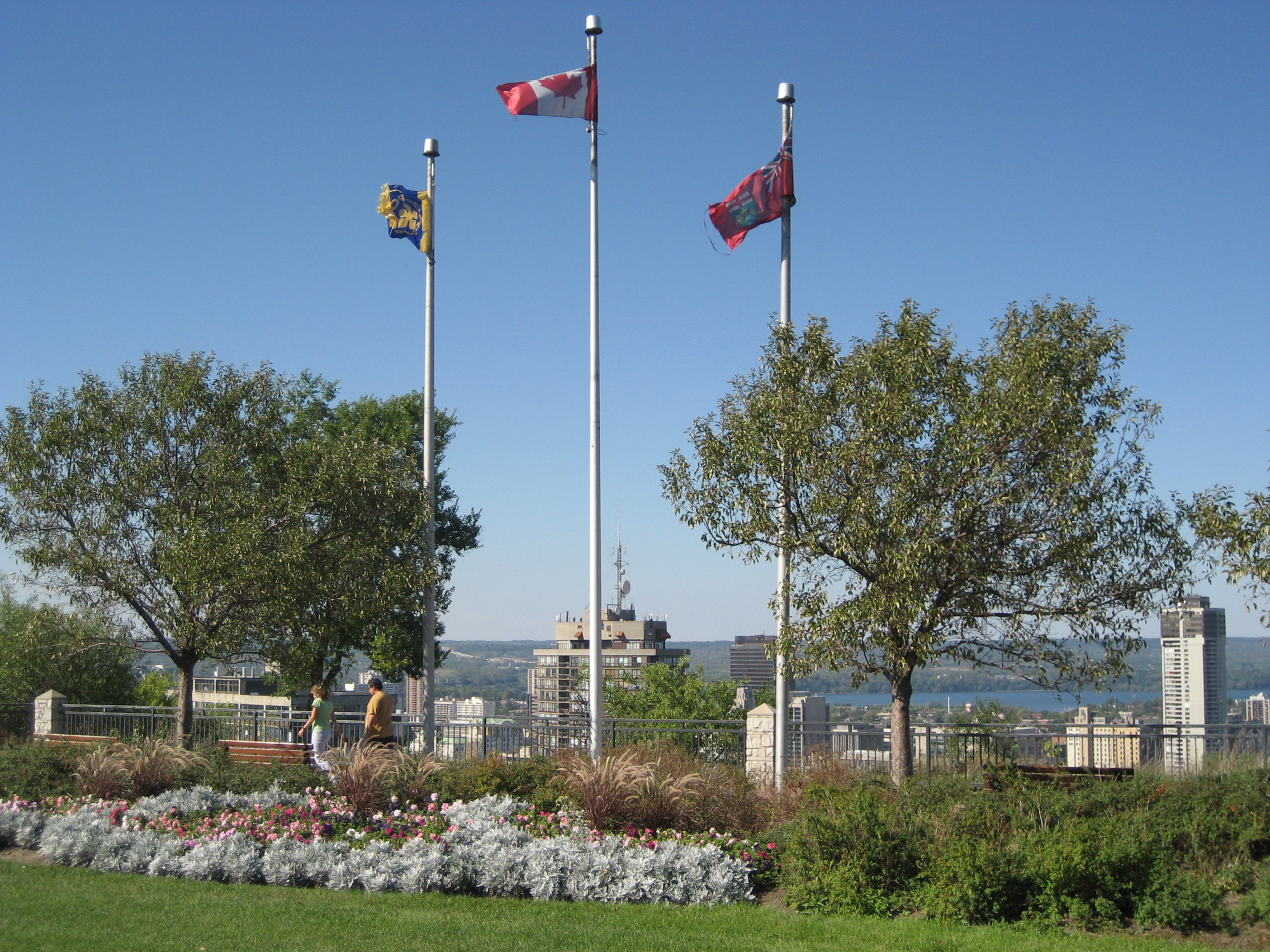
Sam Lawrence Park

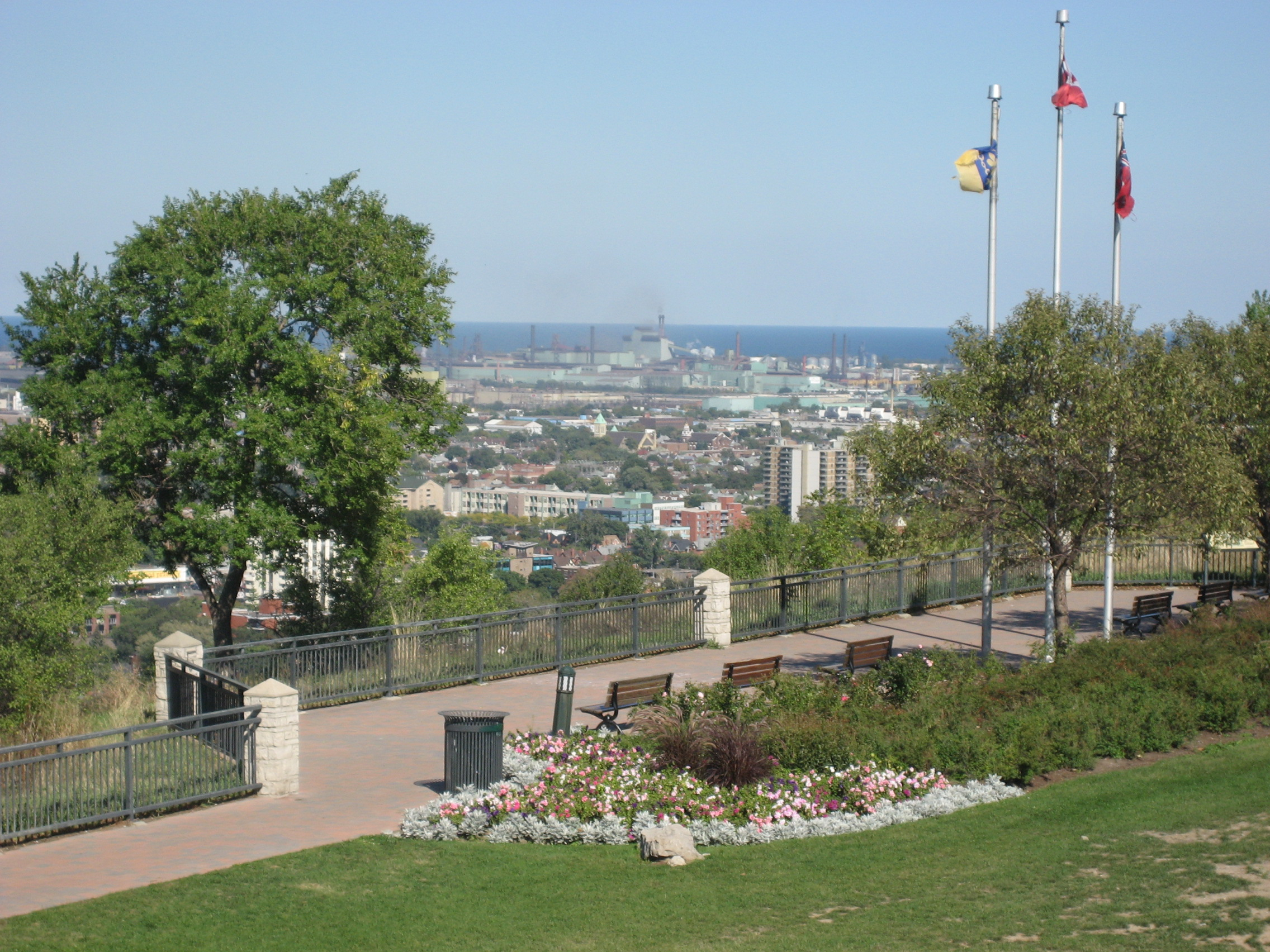
Sam Lawrence Park

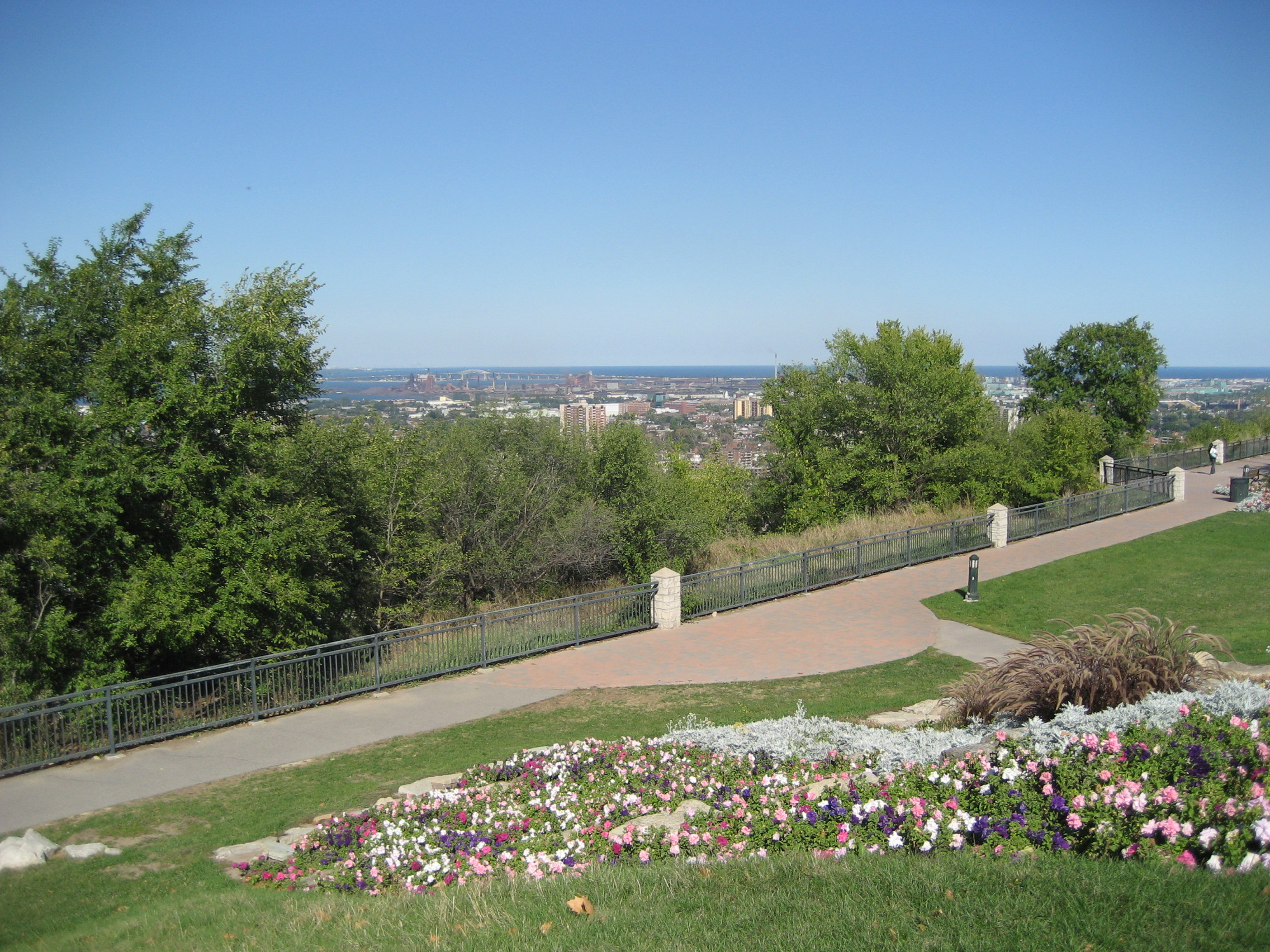
Sam Lawrence Park

== See also ==
- Niagara Escarpment Commission
