= Peter Stevens =

Peter Stevens may refer to:

- Peter Stevens (car designer) (born 1945), British car designer
- Peter Stevens (Manitoba politician)
- Peter Stevens (RAF officer) (1919–1979), German-Jewish RAF bomber pilot and prison of war escapee
- Peter F. Stevens (born 1944), English botanist
- Peter P. Stevens (1909–1989), head college football coach for the Temple University Owls
- Peter John Stevens (born 1995), Slovenian swimmer
- Peter Fayssoux Stevens (1830–1910), American soldier, educator and clergyman

== See also ==
- Peter Stephens (disambiguation)
- Peter Stevenson, former Irish Gaelic footballer
