= Hamilton East (federal electoral district) =

Former federal electoral district in Ontario, Canada

Ontario electoral district

Defunct federal electoral district
- Legislature: House of Commons
- District created: 1903
- District abolished: 2003
- First contested: 1904
- Last contested: 2000

Hamilton East was a federal electoral district in Ontario, Canada. It was represented in the House of Commons of Canada from 1904 to 2004. It consisted of the eastern part of the city of Hamilton, Ontario. It is considered a working class district.

== History ==
The riding was created in 1903 from parts of Hamilton riding.

Hamilton East initially shall consist of wards 1, 6 and 7 of the City of Hamilton. In 1914, it was redefined as consisting of the part of the city of Hamilton described by a line beginning where Ottawa street meets Burlington Bay, south along Ottawa street, west along Burlington street, south along the division line between lots number five and six of the township of Barton, west along Barton Street, south along Sherman Avenue, west along the brow of the mountain, south along Wentworth Street, west along Aberdeen Avenue, north along Ferguson Avenue, west along King street, north along Hughson street to Burlington Bay.

In 1924, it was redefined as consisting the part of the city of Hamilton lying east of Wellington Street and west of Ottawa Street. In 1933, it was redefined to exclude the part of the city lying south of a line from Wellington Street east along Concession Street, north along Sherman Avenue, east along the brow of the mountain to the city limit. In 1952, it was redefined to consist of the part of the city of Hamilton bounded on the east by Ottawa Street, on the south by the brow of the mountain, on the west by Wellington Street.

In 1966, it was redefined to consist of the part of the City of Hamilton bounded on the south by the brow of the Mountain, on the west by a line from Hamilton Harbour south on Wellington Street, east along Robert Street, south along East Avenue, east along Main Street, south along Wentworth Street to the brow of the Mountain; and bounded on the east by a line from Hamilton Harbour south along Parkdale Avenue, west along the C.N.R. line, south along Strathearne Avenue, west along Roxborough Avenue and Kenilworth Avenue to the brow of the Mountain.

In 1976, it was redefined to consist of the part of the City of Hamilton bounded on the east by Red Hill Creek, on the south by the brow of the Mountain, and on the west by a line drawn north along Sherman Avenue, west along Main Street East, and north along Wentworth Avenue.

In 1987, it was redefined to consist of the part of the City of Hamilton lying within the following limits: commencing at the intersection of the easterly limit of the said city with Queenston Road; thence westerly along Queenston Road to Redhill Creek; thence southwesterly along Redhill Creek to the brow of the Niagara Escarpment; thence northerly and westerly along said brow to the southerly production of Sherman Avenue; thence northerly along said production to and along Sherman Avenue to Cannon Street; thence westerly along Cannon Street to Wentworth Street; thence northerly along Wentworth Street and its northerly production to the northerly limit of the City of Hamilton; thence easterly and southerly along the northerly and easterly limits of said city to the point of commencement.

In 1996, it was redefined to consist of the part of the City of Hamilton bounded by a line drawn from the eastern limit of the city along Queenston Road, south along Redhill Creek, north and west along the brow of the Niagara Escarpment, north along Wentworth Street, west along Main Street, north along Wellington Street, east along Burlington Street, north along the spur line of the Canadian National Railway to the northern city limit.

The electoral district was abolished in 2003 when it was redistributed between Hamilton Centre and Hamilton East—Stoney Creek ridings.

== Members of Parliament ==
This riding has elected the following members of Parliament:

Parliament	Years	Member	Party
Hamilton East; Riding created from Hamilton
10th	1904–1908	Samuel Barker	Conservative
11th	1908–1911	Samuel Barker	Conservative
12th	1911–1917	Samuel Barker	Conservative
13th	1917–1921	Sydney Chilton Mewburn	Government (Unionist)
14th	1921–1925	Sydney Chilton Mewburn	Conservative
15th	1925–1926	Sydney Chilton Mewburn	Conservative
16th	1926–1930	George Rennie	Conservative
17th	1930–1931	George Rennie	Conservative
17th	1931–1935	Humphrey Mitchell	Labour
18th	1935–1940	Albert A. Brown	Conservative
19th	1940–1945	Thomas Hambly Ross	Liberal
20th	1945–1949	Thomas Hambly Ross	Liberal
21st	1949–1953	Thomas Hambly Ross	Liberal
22nd	1953–1957	Thomas Hambly Ross	Liberal
23rd	1957–1958	Quinto Martini	Progressive Conservative
24th	1958–1962	Quinto Martini	Progressive Conservative
25th	1962–1963	John Munro	Liberal
26th	1963–1965	John Munro	Liberal
27th	1965–1968	John Munro	Liberal
28th	1968–1972	John Munro	Liberal
29th	1972–1974	John Munro	Liberal
30th	1974–1979	John Munro	Liberal
31st	1979–1980	John Munro	Liberal
32nd	1980–1984	John Munro	Liberal
33rd	1984–1988	Sheila Copps	Liberal
34th	1988–1993	Sheila Copps	Liberal
35th	1993–1996	Sheila Copps	Liberal
35th	1996–1997	Sheila Copps	Liberal
35th	1997–2000	Sheila Copps	Liberal
36th	2000–2004	Sheila Copps	Liberal
Riding dissolved into Hamilton East—Stoney Creek and Hamilton Centre

== Election results ==
1904 Canadian federal election
Party	Candidate	Votes
Conservative	Samuel Barker	2,786
Liberal	John M. Eastwood	2,580

1908 Canadian federal election
Party	Candidate	Votes
Conservative	Samuel Barker	2,968
Liberal	John Morrison Eastwood	1,876
Labour	Samuel Landers	1,320

1911 Canadian federal election
Party	Candidate	Votes
Conservative	Samuel Barker	4,981
Liberal	John Peebles	2,406

1917 Canadian federal election
Party	Candidate	Votes
Government (Unionist)	Sydney Chilton Mewburn	11,340
Opposition—Labour	George Grant Halcrow	0

1921 Canadian federal election
Party	Candidate	Votes
Conservative	Sydney Chilton Mewburn	6,320
Progressive	Edward James Etherington	4,824
Labour	Charles Goodenough Booker	2,274
Liberal	John Newlands	1,667

1925 Canadian federal election
Party	Candidate	Votes
Conservative	Sydney Chilton Mewburn	15,669
Labour	Samuel Lawrence	2,286
Liberal	John Newlands	2,205

1926 Canadian federal election
Party	Candidate	Votes
Conservative	George Rennie	13,444
Liberal	Michael Joseph O'Reilly	4,477

1930 Canadian federal election
Party	Candidate	Votes
Conservative	George Rennie	12,893
Liberal	Freeman Ferrier Treleaven	8,142
Communist	Saul Cohen	343

On Mr. Rennie's death, 13 October 1930:

By-election on 10 August 1931
Party	Candidate	Votes
Labour	Humphrey Mitchell	10,919
Conservative	Melville Robinson	7,263
Independent	William Herbert Connor	507

1935 Canadian federal election
Party	Candidate	Votes
Conservative	Albert A. Brown	10,078
Labour	Humphrey Mitchell	7,288
Reconstruction	Donald A. Clarke	6,197
Co-operative Commonwealth	John Mitchell	4,506

1940 Canadian federal election
Party	Candidate	Votes
Liberal	Thomas Hambly Ross	14,053
National Government	Albert A. Brown	11,716
Co-operative Commonwealth	Roy Aindow	3,190
Communist	Tim Buck	695

1945 Canadian federal election
Party	Candidate	Votes
Liberal	Thomas Hambly Ross	13,176
Progressive Conservative	Bessie Howard Hughton	11,501
Co-operative Commonwealth	Roy Aindow	8,705
Labor–Progressive	Peter Dunlop	1,480
Independent Labour	Robert Parker	241

1949 Canadian federal election
Party	Candidate	Votes
Liberal	Thomas Hambly Ross	14,035
Progressive Conservative	Digby Banting	11,155
Co-operative Commonwealth	Larry Sefton	8,302
Labor–Progressive	Peter Dunlop	1,413
Labour	Robert Parker	307

1953 Canadian federal election
Party	Candidate	Votes
Liberal	Thomas Hambly Ross	11,622
Progressive Conservative	Quinto Martini	7,710
Co-operative Commonwealth	David T. Lawrence	5,648
Labor–Progressive	William Devine	721

1957 Canadian federal election
Party	Candidate	Votes
Progressive Conservative	Quinto Martini	10,528
Liberal	Joe Lanza	8,511
Co-operative Commonwealth	Norm Davison	7,367
Social Credit	Ethel Bertha Fagan	916

1958 Canadian federal election
Party	Candidate	Votes
Progressive Conservative	Quinto Martini	15,046
Liberal	William Momotiuk	7,427
Co-operative Commonwealth	William Powell	6,315
Labor–Progressive	Alfred Dewhurst	537

1962 Canadian federal election
Party	Candidate	Votes
Liberal	John Munro	12,027
Progressive Conservative	Quinto Martini	8,437
New Democratic	Bill Powell	7,353

1963 Canadian federal election
Party	Candidate	Votes
Liberal	John Munro	13,167
Progressive Conservative	Quinto Martini	7,644
New Democratic	Brian O'Donnell	7,015
Social Credit	Vaclav George Vostrez	240

1965 Canadian federal election
Party	Candidate	Votes
Liberal	John Munro	12,692
New Democratic	Brian O'Donnell	7,314
Progressive Conservative	Malcolm Dingwall	5,725
Social Credit	Vaclav George Vostrez	103

1968 Canadian federal election
Party	Candidate	Votes
Liberal	John Munro	15,273
New Democratic	Nick Ramaciert	9,210
Progressive Conservative	David Steinberg	5,633
Communist	James R. Bridgewood	297

1972 Canadian federal election
Party	Candidate	Votes
Liberal	John Munro	13,053
Progressive Conservative	Ron Brewer	8,601
New Democratic	Joe Bothen	8,351
Not affiliated	Donald A. Stewart	151
Social Credit	Charles Hamelin	108
Not affiliated	Ian G. Walker	39

1974 Canadian federal election
Party	Candidate	Votes
Liberal	John Munro	15,298
New Democratic	Bruce Woodruff	6,532
Progressive Conservative	Ron Brewer	6,004
Communist	Jim Bridgewood	157
Social Credit	A. J. Sid Hamelin	62
Marxist–Leninist	Paul G. Lane	52

1979 Canadian federal election
Party	Candidate	Votes
Liberal	John Munro	14,579
New Democratic	Don Gray	11,783
Progressive Conservative	Bill West	11,642
Libertarian	Bruno S. Oberski	172
Marxist–Leninist	Rolf V. Gerstenberger	71

1980 Canadian federal election
Party	Candidate	Votes
Liberal	John Munro	15,430
New Democratic	Don Gray	12,627
Progressive Conservative	Bill West	8,587
Communist	Robert Mann	159
Not affiliated	Chris Watson	58
Marxist–Leninist	Rolf Gerstenberger	47

1984 Canadian federal election
Party	Candidate	Votes
Liberal	Sheila Copps	14,533
New Democratic	David Christopherson	11,872
Progressive Conservative	Jack Macdonald	11,711
Social Credit	Vince G. Vostrez	102
Communist	Elizabeth Rowley	87
Commonwealth of Canada	Ken Perry	59

1988 Canadian federal election
Party	Candidate	Votes
Liberal	Sheila Copps	18,632
New Democratic	Dave Wilson	10,492
Progressive Conservative	Bill West	8,015
Not affiliated	Steve Rutchinski	141
Communist	Elizabeth Rowley	133

1993 Canadian federal election
Party	Candidate	Votes
Liberal	Sheila Copps	23,113
Reform	John Stewart	5,703
Progressive Conservative	Brian Joseph Bobolo	2,320
New Democratic	Wayne Marston	2,216
National	Bill Sommer	470
Independent	Robert Jaggard	135
Independent	James Brink	117
Marxist–Leninist	Rolf Gerstenberger	73
Commonwealth of Canada	Jean-Sebastien Tremblay	53

Resignation of Sheila Copps, 1 May 1996:

By-election on 17 June 1996
Party	Candidate	Votes
Liberal	Sheila Copps	12,268
New Democratic	Wayne Marston	6,941
Progressive Conservative	Angie Tomasic	3,662
Reform	Andy Sweck	2,750
Independent	Ken Campbell	287
Independent	George Ambas	160
Green	Wendy Priesnitz	152
Independent	Glenn Malcolm	113
Christian Heritage	Tristan Emmanuel	78
Independent	Victor Knight	70
Natural Law	Bill Amos	64
Canada Party	Charles Olito	52
Abolitionist	John Turmel	21

1997 Canadian federal election
Party	Candidate	Votes
Liberal	Sheila Copps	16,991
New Democratic	Wayne Marston	6,870
Reform	Kevin Samuel Barber	5,716
Progressive Conservative	Michael Hilson	3,913
Christian Heritage	Monica Purcell	376
Independent	Bob Mann	312
Marxist–Leninist	Rolf Gerstenberger	160

2000 Canadian federal election
Party	Candidate	Votes
Liberal	Sheila Copps	16,477
Alliance	Joshua Conroy	6,064
New Democratic	Jim Stevenson	4,123
Progressive Conservative	Steven Knight	3,359
Marijuana	Michael Baldasaro	573
Independent	Salvatore Sam Cino	290
Communist	Bob Mann	144
Marxist–Leninist	Julie Gordon	116
Natural Law	Helene Darisse-Yildirim	97

== See also ==
- List of Canadian electoral districts
- Historical federal electoral districts of Canada
