= Opinion polling for the 1979 Canadian federal election =

This article is about polls leading up to the 1979 Canadian federal election.

== During the 30th Parliament of Canada ==
Evolution of voting intentions at national level among decided voters
Polling firm	Last day of survey	Source	PC	LPC	NDP	SC	Other	Undecided	ME	Sample
Election 1979	May 22, 1979		35.89	40.11	17.88	4.61	1.51			
Gallup	May 16, 1979		37.5	37.5	19	5	—	—	4	—
CBC-Carleton	May 10, 1979		40.9	39.6	14.5	4.4	0.6	—	3	2,322
CTV	May 1979		40	40	17	3	—	—	—	—
CBC-Carleton	April 20, 1979		40.2	38.4	16	4.6	—	—	—	2,286
Gallup	April 5, 1979		38	43	17	—	—	—	4	1,004
Fabien Roy becomes leader of the SC (March 30, 1979)
Gallup	March 1979		41	41	15	—	—	—	4	1,047
Complan	March 1979		40	42	14	2	2	—	—	—
Lorne Reznowski resigns and Charles-Arthur Gauthier becomes interim leader of SC (February 23, 1979)
Complan	February 1979		37	42	17	—	—	—	—	2,000
Gallup	February 1979		38	39	19	—	—	—	—	—
Gallup	January 6, 1979		40	39	17	—	—	—	—	—
Gallup	December 1978		40	38	18	—	4	—	—	1,015
Gallup	November 1978		45	35	18	—	2	—	—	1,035
Gallup	October 1978		42	37	17	—	4	—	—	—
Gallup	September 9, 1978		38	41	17	—	—	—	—	—
Gallup	August 1978		35	45	15	—	—	—	4	1,000
Gallup	July 1978		34	42	19	—	—	—	—	—
Lorne Reznowski becomes leader of SC (May 7, 1978)
Gallup	May 1978		39	43	15	—	—	—	—	—
Gilles Caouette resigns and Charles-Arthur Gauthier becomes interim leader of SC (April 11, 1978)
Gallup	April 1978		41	41	14	—	4	—	4	1,035
Gallup	March 1978		34	45	17	—	4	—	—	—
Gallup	February 1978		34	45	17	—	4	38	—	—
Gallup	December 1977		34	42	19	—	5	36	—	1,010
Gallup	November 1977		34	44	18	—	4	33	—	—
Gallup	October 1977		32	49	15	—	5	—	—	—
Gallup	September 1977		30	49	18	—	3	—	—	—
Gallup	August 1977		29	50	17	—	4	—	—	—
Gallup	July 1977		27	51	18	—	4	—	—	—
André-Gilles Fortin died (June 24, 1977) Gilles Caouette becomes interim leader of SC (June 29, 1977)
Gallup	June 1977		27	51	18	—	—	—	—	—
Gallup	May 1977		32	47	17	—	—	—	—	—
Gallup	April 1977		34	44	18	—	—	39	—	—
Gallup	March 1977		36	42	17	—	—	—	—	—
Gallup	February 1977		37	41	17	—	4	—	—	—
Gallup	January 1977		45	35	16	—	4	—	—	—
Gallup	December 1976		47	33	16	—	4	35	—	1,053
André-Gilles Fortin becomes leader of the SC (November 7, 1976)
Gallup	November 1976		42	35	17	—	6	35	4	1,058
Gallup	October 1976		44	33	17	—	6	—	—	—
Réal Caouette resigns as leader of the SC (September 16, 1976)
Gallup	September 1976		45	33	16	—	6	—	—	—
Gallup	August 1976		47	29	17	—	7	—	—	—
Gallup	July 1976		46	31	17	—	5	33	4	1,011
Gallup	June 1976		44	34	16	—	5	—	—	—
Gallup	May 1976		43	31	21	—	5	—	—	—
Gallup	April 1976		46	31	17	—	6	—	—	—
Gallup	March 1976		43	34	17	—	6	29	—	—
Joe Clark becomes leader of the PC party (February 22, 1976)
Gallup	February 1976		37	38	19	—	6	—	—	—
Gallup	January 1976		37	39	17	—	7	—	—	—
Gallup	December 1975		36	38	19	—	7	—	—	—
Gallup	November 1975		32	38	22	—	8	—	—	—
Gallup	October 1975		33	40	20	—	7	—	—	—
Ed Broadbent becomes leader of the NDP (July 7, 1975)
Gallup	July 1975		36	39	17	—	8	41	4	1,039
Gallup	June 1975		33	41	17	—	9	—	—	—
Gallup	May 1975		35	41	18	—	6	—	—	—
Gallup	April 1975		32	44	17	—	7	—	—	—
Gallup	March 1975		31	47	16	—	6	—	—	1,058
Gallup	February 1975		30	47	17	—	6	—	—	—
Gallup	January 1975		31	46	17	—	6	—	—	—
Gallup	December 1974		32	44	16	—	8	—	—	—
Gallup	November 1974		33	45	16	—	6	—	—	—
Gallup	October 1974		29	48	15	—	8	—	—	—
Gallup	September 1974		28	48	16	—	8	—	—	—
Election 1974	July 8, 1974		35.46	43.15	15.44	5.06	0.89			
