= Progressive Conservative Party of Canada candidates in the 1979 Canadian federal election =

The Progressive Conservative Party of Canada fielded a full slate of candidates in the 1979 federal election, and won 136 out of 282 seats to form a minority government. Many of the party's candidates have their own biography pages; information about others may be found here.

== Ontario ==
=== Nickel Belt: Harwood Nesbitt ===
Harwood Nesbitt was a shop technical teacher. He received 7,308 votes (17.83%), finishing third against New Democratic Party incumbent John Rodriguez.
