= George Rennie (Canadian politician) =

Canadian politician

George S. Rennie

Member of Parliament for Hamilton East
- In office September 1926 – October 1930
- Preceded by: Sydney Chilton Mewburn
- Succeeded by: Humphrey Mitchell

Personal details
- Born: George Septimus Rennie; 23 July 1866 Hamilton, Canada West
- Died: 13 October 1930 (aged 64) Hamilton, Ontario, Canada
- Party: Conservative
- Spouse(s): Nathalie Hamilton m. 30 May 1899
- Profession: coroner, physician, surgeon

George Septimus Rennie CMG (23 July 1866 – 13 October 1930) was a Conservative member of the House of Commons of Canada. He was born in Hamilton, Canada West and became a coroner, physician and surgeon.

Rennie attended schools at Hamilton then Toronto where he received his first medical degrees at Toronto's Trinity Medical College. He proceeded to further studies in London where he received the Royal College of Physicians licentiate (LRCP) diploma. He received his LRCS licence at Edinburgh. Rennie studied further at Paris and Vienna.

He served in the military from 1894 through World War I in a variety of postings, attaining the rank of colonel in 1915. He was appointed a Companion of the Order of St Michael and St George in the 1918 New Year Honours for his work with the Army Medical Corps.

He became the medical director of the Commonwealth Life Insurance Company and surgeon-in-chief of the Toronto, Hamilton and Buffalo Railway. He was also appointed Hamilton's chief coroner.

He was first elected to Parliament at the Hamilton East riding in the 1926 general election and re-elected there in the 1930 federal election.

During his term in the 17th Canadian Parliament, Rennie contracted a severe case of double pneumonia. He died at Hamilton General Hospital on 13 October 1930 after two weeks with this illness.
