= Humphrey Mitchell =

Canadian politician

The Honourable Humphrey Mitchell PC
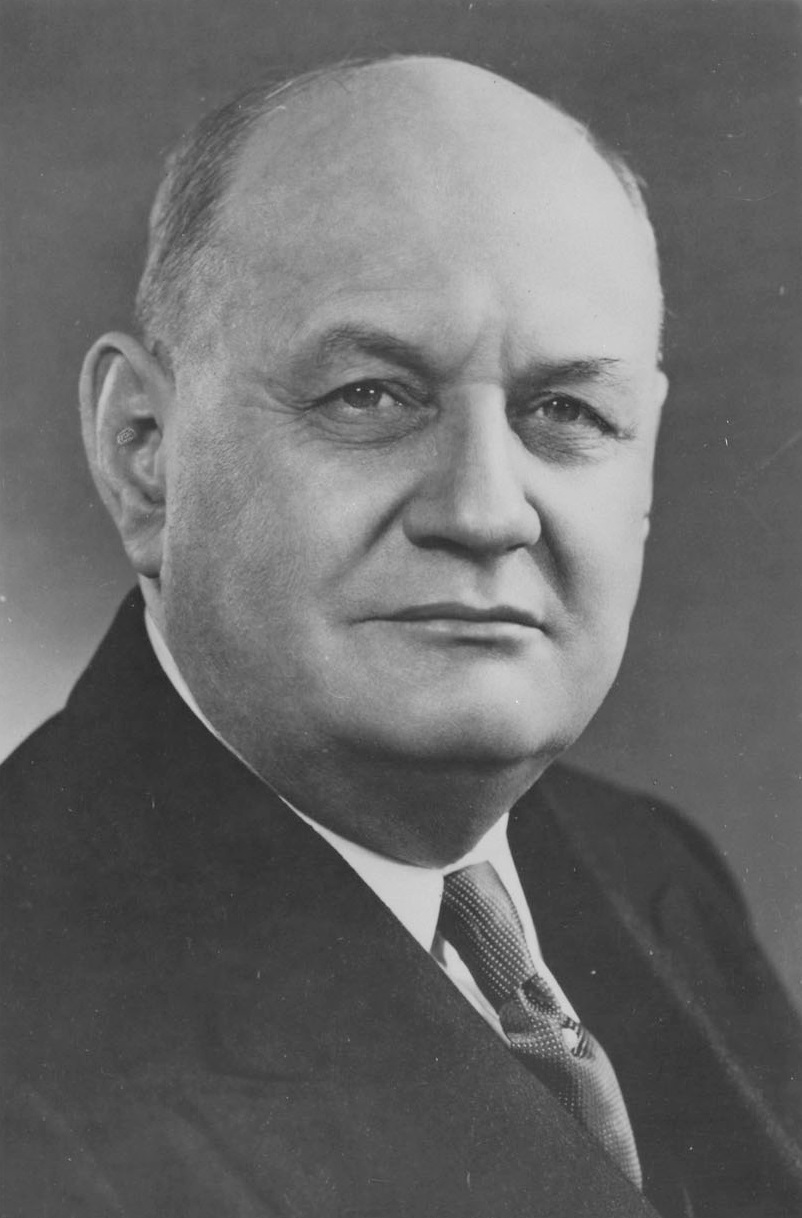
- Mitchell in the mid-1940s.

Minister of Labour
- In office 1941–1950
- Prime Minister: William Lyon Mackenzie King
- Preceded by: Norman Alexander McLarty
- Succeeded by: Paul Martin Sr. (acting)

Member of Parliament for Welland
- In office 1942–1950
- Preceded by: Arthur Damude
- Succeeded by: William Hector McMillan

Member of Parliament for Hamilton East
- In office 1931–1935
- Prime Minister: R. B. Bennett
- Preceded by: George Rennie
- Succeeded by: Albert A. Brown

Personal details
- Born: September 9, 1894
- Died: August 1, 1950 (aged 55)
- Party: Liberal–Labour
- Profession: Land surveyor

Humphrey Mitchell, PC (September 9, 1894 – August 1, 1950) was a Canadian politician and trade unionist.

== Life and career ==
A land surveyor employed with Hamilton Hydro, Mitchell was active with the union movement in the city. Upon the death of Hamilton East's Conservative Member of Parliament (MP), George Septimus Rennie in 1931, Mitchell was approached to run in the by-election to fill the seat as a Labour candidate. Hamilton East was a strong working class riding that had elected Labour candidates to the Legislative Assembly of Ontario and to city council.

The Liberals, in opposition having lost the previous year's general election did not run a candidate against Mitchell in order to avoid dividing the anti-Conservative vote. Given future events, it is also possible Liberal party leaders believed that Mitchell would support the Liberal Party unofficially if elected.

Mitchell won the by-election and entered the House of Commons of Canada. He did not get along well with the rump of Independent Labour MPs led informally by J.S. Woodsworth and referred to as the "Ginger Group". While Mitchell attended the "founding meeting" of the Co-operative Commonwealth Federation in William Irvine's office, he refused to join the new party when Labour MPs joined with farmers groups, socialist groups and others to officially launch the CCF in 1932 and refused to work with its supporters in Parliament.

In the 1935 general election, the CCF ran a candidate in Hamilton East against Mitchell (the Liberals again ran no candidate). The use of the first past the post election system and the split in the anti-Tory vote resulted in the Conservative candidate winning, despite a country-wide trend against the Conservatives.

Mitchell ran for and was acclaimed to the Hamilton Board of Education as a school trustee that December.

Mitchell did not run in the 1940 election. Following the death of Welland's Liberal MP in late 1941, William Lyon Mackenzie King appointed Mitchell to the Cabinet as Minister of Labour. Mitchell was elected shortly thereafter as the MP for Welland. He served as Welland's MP and as Labour minister in the governments of King and Louis St. Laurent until his death in 1950.

Mitchell became Labour minister just over a year after the introduction of unemployment insurance in Canada and oversaw the early implementation and expansion of the program. He also oversaw the mobilization of the labour force during World War II and widespread involvement of women in war production.

The department of labour he led had responsibility for immigration so he played a role in the controversial deportation and internment of tens of thousands of Japanese Canadians during World War II.

== Electoral record ==
1949 Canadian federal election: Welland
Party	Candidate	Votes	%	±%
Liberal	Humphrey Mitchell	23,734	47.3	+3.7
Progressive Conservative	Sam Hughes	13,259	26.4	-6.3
Co-operative Commonwealth	Armour McCrae	11,493	22.9	+6.4
Labor–Progressive	Melbourne A. Doig	1,711	3.4	
Total valid votes		50,197	100.0	

1945 Canadian federal election: Welland
Party	Candidate	Votes	%	±%
Liberal	Humphrey Mitchell	19,522	43.6	+1.3
Progressive Conservative	Thomas Oscar Oliver	14,637	32.7	
Co-operative Commonwealth	Harland Roy Potter	7,383	16.5	-5.3
Farmer–Labour	Fern A. Sayles	3,258	7.3	
Total valid votes		44,800	100.0	

Canadian federal by-election, 9 February 1942: Welland On Mr. Damude's death, 15 September 1941
Party	Candidate	Votes	%	±%
Liberal	Humphrey Mitchell	11,875	42.3	-10.2
Independent	J. Douglas Watt	10,106	36.0	
Co-operative Commonwealth	Mark Kriluk	6,122	21.8	+14.1
Total valid votes		28,103	100.0	

Summary of the December 2, 1935 Hamilton Board of Education Ward 5 Trustee Election
Candidate	Affiliation	Popular vote		Elected?
Candidate	Affiliation	Votes	%	Elected?
Humphrey Mitchell	Independent Liberal-Labour	Acclaimed		
Total votes				
Registered voters				
Note: Candidate campaign colours are used as a visual differentiation between candidates and to indicate affiliation.
Sources: "Five School Trustees Are Not Opposed", Hamilton Spectator, November 22, 1935, pp. 7,17.

1935 Canadian federal election: Hamilton East
Party	Candidate	Votes
Conservative	Albert A. Brown	10,078
Labour	Humphrey Mitchell	7,288
Reconstruction	Donald A. Clarke	6,197
Co-operative Commonwealth	John Mitchell	4,506

Canadian federal by-election, August 10, 1930: Hamilton East On death of George Rennie, 13 October 1930
Party	Candidate	Votes
Labour	Humphrey Mitchell	10,919
Conservative	Melville Robinson	7,263
Independent	William Herbert Connor	507
