= Liberal Party of Canada candidates in the 1979 Canadian federal election =

The Liberal Party of Canada fielded a full slate of 282 candidates in the 1979 Canadian federal election, and won 114 seats to become the Official Opposition in parliament. The party had previously been in government since 1963.

Many of the party's candidates have their own biography pages. Information about others may be found here.

== Ontario ==
=== Philipp Varelis (Broadview—Greenwood) ===
Varelis was born on the island Corfu, Greece, and moved to Canada in October 26, 1968. He worked as an accountant in private life, and first ran for the House of Commons of Canada in a 1978 by-election, in the Toronto riding of Broadview. He won the Liberal nomination with 57% over former candidate Lou Yankou, following an acrimonious nomination meeting that divided the local party organization. Valeris, who was forty-one years old at the time, argued that the country's financial situation was better than it appeared from media reports. He ran what the Toronto Star described as an "old-fashioned Liberal ethnic campaign", arguing that "only an immigrant can understand the problems of an immigrant". He finished third against Bob Rae, who was then a member of the New Democratic Party.

Varelis lost to Rae again in the 1979 general election. During this campaign, he indicated his support for the restoration of capital punishment. He planned to run a third time in 1980, but was persuaded to stand aside in favour of Philippe Gigantès. By way of a compromise, Varelis became Deane Gigantes's campaign chairman.

Electoral record
Election	Division	Party	Votes	%	Place	Winner
Canadian federal by-election, 16 October 1978	Broadview	Liberal	3,466	17.31	3/4	Bob Rae, New Democratic Party
1979 federal	Broadview—Greenwood	Liberal	9,290	27.98	3/7	Bob Rae, New Democratic Party
