= Quinto Martini (politician) =

Canadian politician

Member of Parliament for Hamilton East
- In office 1957–1962
- Preceded by: Thomas Hambly Ross
- Succeeded by: John Munro

Personal details
- Born: August 15, 1908 Hamilton, Ontario, Canada
- Died: July 27, 1975 (aged 66) Hamilton, Ontario, Canada
- Party: Progressive Conservative
- Spouse(s): Lucy Caiazzo m. 25 Jun 1931
- Profession: real estate broker

Quinto Antonio Martini (August 15, 1908 – July 27, 1975) was a Canadian politician and real estate broker, born in Hamilton, Ontario.

Martini was born in Hamilton on August 15, 1908, to Benito Martini and Palmina Rossi, both of whom were Italian. He attended St Ann's School in Hamilton, and then Hamilton Technical School. On June 25, 1931, he married Lucy Caiazzo, daughter of a real-estate broker.

He was elected Member of Parliament for Hamilton East in 1957, and became the first Italian Canadian elected to parliament. He lost his seat in 1962.
