= Peter Stephens =

Peter Stephens may refer to:

- Peter Stephens (actor) (1920–1972), English actor
- Peter Stephens (footballer, born 1879) (1879–1946), Australian rules footballer who played with Geelong in the 1900s
- Peter Stephens (footballer, born 1950), former Australian rules footballer who played with Geelong in the 1970s
- Peter Stephens (journalist) (1927–2016), British journalist and newspaper editor
- Peter Stephens (pioneer) (1687–1757), founder of Stephens City, Virginia
- Peter John Stephens (1912–2002), British children's author

== See also ==
- Peter Stevens (disambiguation)
