= Sydney Chilton Mewburn =

Canadian politician and soldier (1863–1956)

The Honourable Sydney Chilton Mewburn PC
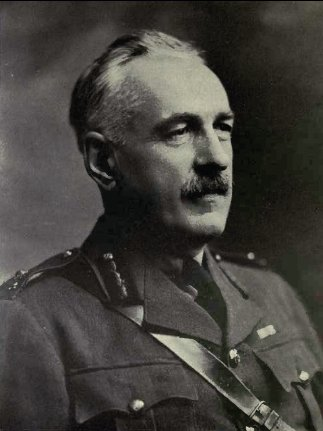

Member of the Canadian Parliament for Hamilton East
- In office 1917–1926
- Preceded by: Samuel Barker
- Succeeded by: George Septimus Rennie

Personal details
- Born: December 4, 1863 Hamilton, Canada West
- Died: August 11, 1956 (aged 92)
- Party: Conservative
- Cabinet: Minister of Militia and Defence (1917-1920)

Military service
- Allegiance: Canada
- Branch/service: Canadian Army
- Years of service: ?-1917
- Rank: Major-General
- Commands: Royal Hamilton Light Infantry (13th Royal Regiment c. 1910)
- Battles/wars: Vimy

Sydney Chilton Mewburn, PC (December 4, 1863 – August 11, 1956) was a Canadian lawyer, soldier, and politician.

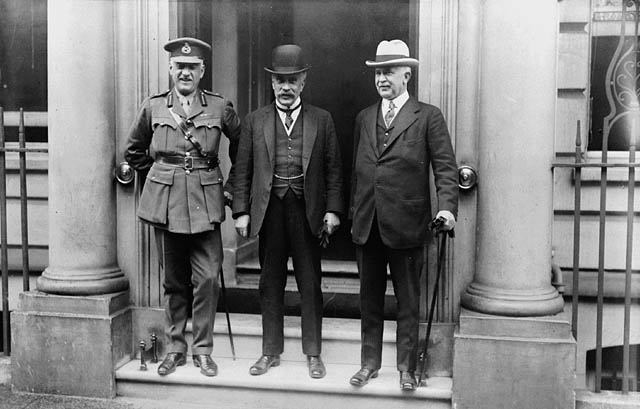
Major-General S.C. Mewburn, Sir Robert Borden, and Sir A.E. Kemp

Born in Hamilton, Canada West, he was the Minister of Militia and Defence from October 12, 1917, to January 15, 1920, under Sir Robert Borden's Union Government. Mewburn was Commanding Officer (Colonel) of the Royal Hamilton Light Infantry (13th Royal Regiment as of 1910) and served during World War I, he was a Major General (and Adjutant-General) in the Canadian Army before his appointment as Minister of Militia in October 1917. His son John Mewburn served in the Canadian Expeditionary Force and was killed in action during the Battle of Flers–Courcelette in September 1916.

Mewburn was later the Chair of the 1920 Canadian Battlefields Memorials Commission, which selected the site for the Vimy Memorial.
