= Albert A. Brown =

Canadian lawyer, athlete and politician

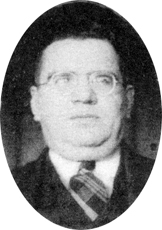

Member of the Canadian Parliament for Hamilton East
- In office 1935–1940
- Preceded by: Humphrey Mitchell
- Succeeded by: Thomas Hambly Ross

Personal details
- Born: July 29, 1895 Hamilton, Ontario, Canada
- Died: June 19, 1971 (aged 75)
- Party: Conservative Party (1935-1940), National Government (1940)
- Occupation: barrister, lawyer, professional football player

Albert A. Brown (July 29, 1895 – June 19, 1971) was a Canadian politician, barrister, lawyer and professional Canadian football player. He was elected to the House of Commons of Canada as a Member of the Conservative Party in the 1935 election to represent the riding of Hamilton East. He was a candidate in the 1940 election for the Parliament of Canada, and lost the election.
