= Social Credit Party of Canada candidates in the 1984 Canadian federal election =

The Social Credit Party of Canada ran a number of candidates in the 1984 federal election, none of whom were elected.

== Quebec ==
=== Richelieu: Rénald Bibeau ===
Rénald Bibeau listed himself as a day-worker. He received 202 votes (0.42%), finishing sixth against Progressive Conservative candidate Louis Plamondon.

== Ontario ==
=== Hamilton East: Vince G. Vostrez ===
Vostrez listed himself as a supervisor with National Steel Car. It is possible that he is the same person as "Vaclav George Vostrez", a steelworker who twice campaigned for the Social Credit Party in Hamilton East during the 1960s. For reasons of convenience, a single electoral history has been provided for both names.

Electoral record
Election	Division	Party	Votes	%	Place	Winner
1963 federal	Hamilton East	Social Credit	240		4/4	John Munro, Liberal
1965 federal	Hamilton East	Social Credit	103		4/4	John Munro, Liberal
1984 federal	Hamilton East	Social Credit	102	0.27	4/6	Sheila Copps, Liberal

== See also ==
- Social Credit Party candidates, 1979 Canadian federal election
