= 1979 Canadian federal election =

- May 22, 1979

282 seats in the House of Commons 142 seats needed for a majority
- Opinion polls
- Turnout: 75.7% (▲4.7 pp)
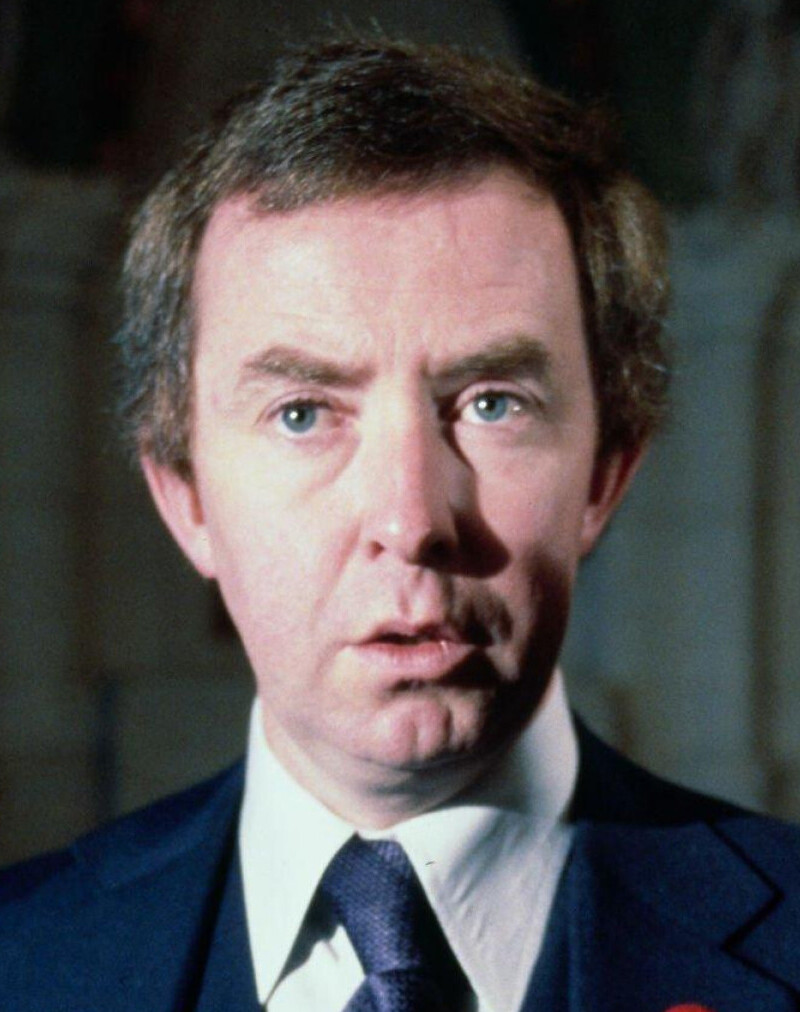

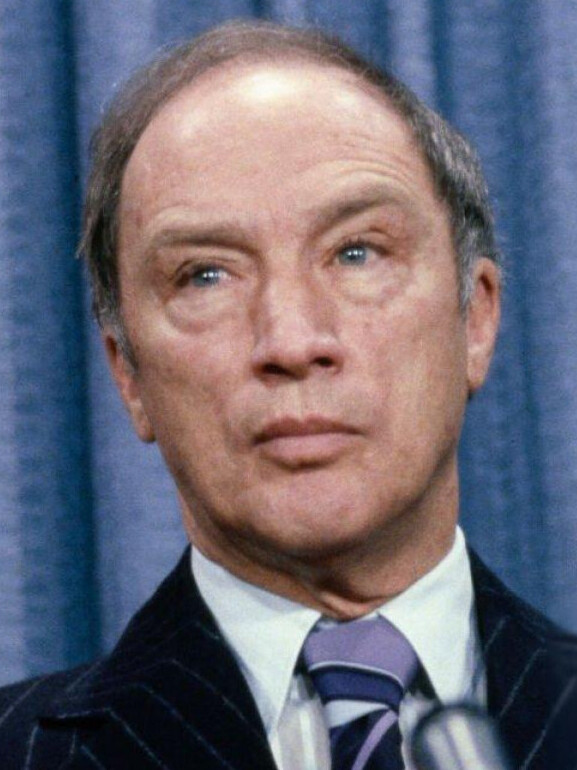

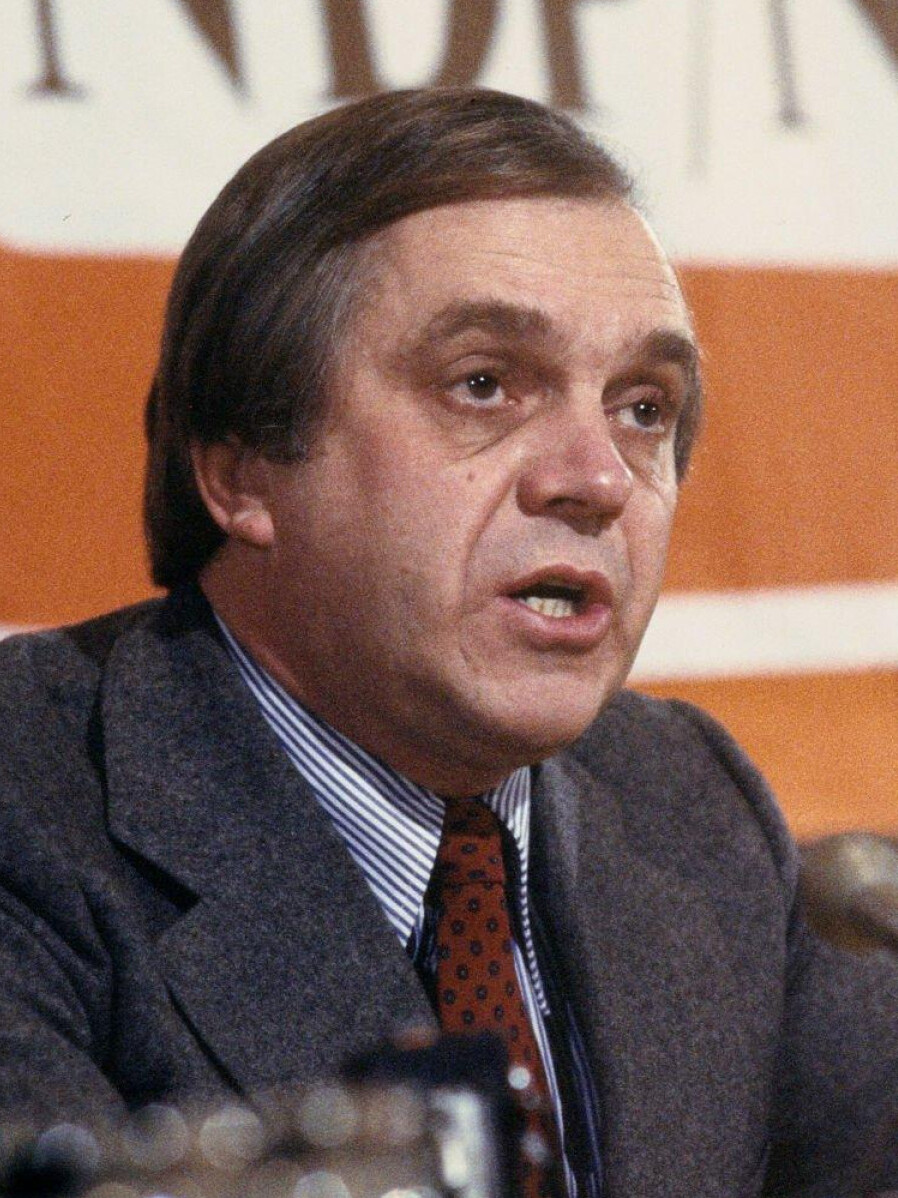
| | First party | Second party |
|---|---|---|
| Leader | Joe Clark | Pierre Trudeau |
| Party | Progressive Conservative | Liberal |
| Leader since | February 22, 1976 | April 6, 1968 |
| Leader's seat | Yellowhead | Mount Royal |
| Last election | 95 seats, 35.46% | 141 seats, 43.15% |
| Seats before | 98 | 133 |
| Seats won | 136 | 114 |
| Seat change | ▲38 | ▼19 |
| Popular vote | 4,111,606 | 4,595,319 |
| Percentage | 35.89% | 40.11% |
| Swing | ▲0.43 pp | ▼3.04 pp |
| | Third party | Fourth party |
| | | SC |
| Leader | Ed Broadbent | Fabien Roy |
| Party | New Democratic | Social Credit |
| Leader since | July 7, 1975 | March 30, 1979 |
| Leader's seat | Oshawa | Beauce |
| Last election | 16 seats, 15.44% | 11 seats, 5.06% |
| Seats before | 17 | 9 |
| Seats won | 26 | 6 |
| Seat change | ▲9 | ▼3 |
| Popular vote | 2,048,988 | 527,604 |
| Percentage | 17.88% | 4.61% |
| Swing | ▲2.45 pp | ▼0.46 pp |

- The Canadian parliament after the 1979 election
Prime Minister before election
Pierre Trudeau
Liberal
Prime Minister after election
Joe Clark
Progressive Conservative

The 1979 Canadian federal election was held on May 22, 1979, to elect members of the House of Commons of Canada of the 31st Parliament of Canada. It resulted in the defeat of the Liberal Party of Canada after 16 years in power, 11 of them under Prime Minister Pierre Trudeau. Joe Clark led the Progressive Conservative Party to power but with only a minority of seats in the House of Commons. The Liberals, however, beat the Progressive Conservatives in the overall popular vote by more than 400,000 votes (40.11% to 35.89%). Taking office on the eve of his 40th birthday, Clark became the youngest prime minister in Canadian history.

== Overview ==
The PC Party campaigned on the slogans, "Let's get Canada working again", and "It's time for a change – give the future a chance!" Canadians were not, however, sufficiently confident in the young Joe Clark to give him a majority in the House of Commons. Quebec, in particular, was unwilling to support Clark and elected only two PC Members of Parliament (MPs) in the province's 75 ridings. Clark, relatively unknown when elected as PC leader at the 1976 PC Party convention, was seen as being bumbling and unsure. Clark had had problems with certain right-wing members of his caucus. In particular, when Clark's riding was merged into the riding of another PC MP during a redistribution of ridings, the other MP refused to step aside, and Clark ended up running in another riding. Also, when Clark undertook a tour of the Middle East to show his ability to handle foreign affairs issues, his luggage was lost, and Clark appeared to be uncomfortable with the issues being discussed.

The Liberals tried to make leadership and Clark's inexperience the issue by arguing in their advertising, "This is no time for on-the-job training" and "We need tough leadership to keep Canada growing. A leader must be a leader."

The Social Credit Party of Canada ("Socred"), which had lost its mercurial leader, Réal Caouette, who died in 1976, struggled to remain relevant. After a series of interim leaders, including Caouette's son, the party turned to Fabien Roy, a popular member of the National Assembly of Quebec, who took the reins of the party just before the beginning of the campaign. The party won the tacit support of the separatist Parti Québécois, which formed the government of Quebec. Social Credit attempted to rally the separatist and nationalist vote: Canadian flags were absent at its campaign kick-off rally, and the party's slogan was C'est à notre tour ("It's our turn"), which was reminiscent of the popular separatist anthem Gens du pays ("People of the Country"), which includes the chorus, "C'est votre tour, de vous laisser parler d'amour" ("It's your turn, to let you talk about love"). The party focused its platform on constitutional change, which promised to fight to abolish the federal government's constitutional power to disallow any provincial legislation and stated that each province has a "right to choose its own destiny within Canada."

The Socreds' support from the Parti Québécois was not welcome by everyone; for instance, Gilles Caouette publicly denounced what he called péquistes déguisés en créditistes ("péquistes disguised as Socreds"). What remained of its support outside Quebec virtually disappeared, and while the party only suffered a marginal loss in its overall Quebec vote share, its support was much less efficiently distributed than before. The party managed some increase of votes in péquiste areas, but also lost many votes in areas of traditional Socred strength while much of the reduced PC vote share went to the Liberals. The result was a drop from eleven to six seats. (See also: Social Credit Party candidates, 1979 Canadian federal election.)

Clark's minority government lasted less than nine months. Clark required support from the Socreds to pass the 1979 budget but refused to work with them on ideological grounds, opting instead to "govern as though he had a majority." With none of their demands being met, the Socreds refused to prop up the government. That resulted in the 1980 election in which the PCs were defeated by the resurgent Trudeau Liberals.

As of 2025, this is the earliest Canadian election from which a major party leader (Clark) is still alive.

== National results ==
The Conservatives won the popular vote in seven provinces, while losing the popular vote nationwide, and because they won only two seats in Quebec, Clark won only a minority government. The Liberals won only one seat west of Manitoba. The election was the last in which the Social Credit Party of Canada won seats. An unusual event occurred in the Northwest Territories: the Liberals took more votes overall than any other party but won neither of the territory's two seats.

| Party | Party leader | # of candidates | Seats | | | | Popular vote | | |
|---|---|---|---|---|---|---|---|---|---|
| Party | Party leader | # of candidates | 1974 | Dissolution | Elected | % Change | # | % | Change |
| Progressive Conservative | Joe Clark | 282 | 95 | 98 | 136 | +43.2% | 4,111,606 | 35.89% | +0.43pp |
| Liberal | Pierre Trudeau | 282 | 141 | 133 | 114 | −19.1% | 4,595,319 | 40.11% | −3.04pp |
| New Democratic Party | Ed Broadbent | 282 | 16 | 17 | 26 | +62.5% | 2,048,988 | 17.88% | +2.45pp |
| Social Credit | Fabien Roy | 103 | 11 | 9 | 6 | −45.5% | 527,604 | 4.61% | −0.46pp |
| Rhinoceros | Cornelius I | 63 | | | - | | 62,601 | 0.55% | |
| Independent | | 48 | 1 | 5 | - | −100% | 30,518 | 0.27% | −0.14pp |
| Unknown | | 19 | - | - | - | - | 21,268 | 0.19% | +0.01pp |
| Union Populaire | | 69 | | | - | | 19,514 | 0.17% | |
| Libertarian | Alex Eaglesham | 60 | | | - | | 16,042 | 0.14% | |
| Marxist–Leninist | Hardial Bains | 144 | - | - | - | - | 14,231 | 0.12% | −0.05pp |
| Communist | William Kashtan | 71 | - | - | - | - | 9,141 | 0.08% | −0.05pp |
| No affiliation | | 1 | - | - | - | - | 176 | x | x |
| Vacant | | | | 2 | | | | | |
| Total | | 1,424 | 265 | 265 | 282 | +6.8% | 11,457,008 | 100.00% | |
Sources: http://www.elections.ca History of Federal Ridings since 1867

Notes:

"% change" refers to change from previous election.

x − less than 0.005% of the popular vote.

== Vote and seat summaries ==
Ternary plots - shift of electoral support (1974-1979)
1974

1979
Electoral districts identified by colours of winning parties

Popular vote
| Liberal | 40.11% |
| PC | 35.89% |
| NDP | 17.88% |
| Social Credit | 4.61% |
| Others | 1.51% |

Seat totals
| PC | 48.23% |
| Liberal | 40.43% |
| NDP | 9.22% |
| Social Credit | 2.13% |

== Results by province ==
| Party name | | BC | AB | SK | MB | ON | QC | NB | NS | PE | NL | NT | YK | Total |
|---|---|---|---|---|---|---|---|---|---|---|---|---|---|---|
| Progressive Conservative | Seats: | 19 | 21 | 10 | 7 | 57 | 2 | 4 | 8 | 4 | 2 | 1 | 1 | 136 |
| Progressive Conservative | Popular Vote: | 44.3 | 65.6 | 41.2 | 43.4 | 41.8 | 13.5 | 40.0 | 45.4 | 52.8 | 27.7 | 32.3 | 40.6 | 35.9 |
| Liberal | Seats: | 1 | - | - | 2 | 32 | 67 | 6 | 2 | - | 4 | - | - | 114 |
| Liberal | Vote: | 23.0 | 22.1 | 21.8 | 23.5 | 36.4 | 61.7 | 44.6 | 35.5 | 40.6 | 41.7 | 34.1 | 36.4 | 40.1 |
| New Democratic Party | Seats: | 8 | - | 4 | 5 | 6 | - | - | 1 | - | 1 | 1 | - | 26 |
| New Democratic Party | Vote: | 31.9 | 9.9 | 35.8 | 32.7 | 21.1 | 5.1 | 15.3 | 18.7 | 6.5 | 30.6 | 31.9 | 23.1 | 17.9 |
| Social Credit | Seats: | - | - | - | - | - | 6 | | | | | | | 6 |
| Social Credit | Vote: | 0.2 | 1.0 | 0.5 | 0.2 | xx | 16.0 | | | | | | | 4.6 |
| Total seats: | | 28 | 21 | 14 | 14 | 95 | 75 | 10 | 11 | 4 | 7 | 2 | 1 | 282 |
Parties that won no seats
| Rhinoceros | Vote: | xx | | | | xx | 1.9 | | | | | | | 0.5 |
| Independent | Vote: | 0.2 | 1.1 | 0.7 | 0.1 | 0.1 | 0.3 | 0.1 | 0.3 | | | 1.6 | | 0.3 |
| Unknown | Vote: | 0.1 | 0.2 | xx | xx | xx | 0.5 | | xx | | | | | 0.2 |
| Union Populaire | Vote: | | | | | | 0.6 | | | | | | | 0.2 |
| Libertarian | Vote: | xx | xx | | | 0.3 | 0.1 | | | xx | | | | 0.1 |
| Marxist–Leninist | Vote: | 0.1 | 0.1 | 0.1 | 0.1 | 0.1 | 0.2 | | xx | | | | | 0.1 |
| Communist | Vote: | 0.2 | 0.1 | xx | 0.1 | 0.1 | 0.1 | | xx | | | | | 0.1 |
| No affiliation | Vote: | xx | xx | xx | xx | xx | | | | | | | | xx |

xx – less than 0.05% of the popular vote.

=== Notes ===
- Number of parties: 9
  - First appearance: Libertarian Party of Canada, Union populaire
  - Reappearance after hiatus: Rhinoceros Party of Canada
  - Final appearance: none

== See also ==
- List of Canadian federal general elections
- List of political parties in Canada

Articles on parties' candidates in this election:

- Liberal
- Progressive Conservative
- Social Credit
