= Social Credit Party of Canada candidates in the 1979 Canadian federal election =

The Social Credit Party of Canada won six seats in the 1979 federal election, all in the province of Quebec. It also fielded candidates in other provinces. Some of the party's candidates have their own biography pages; information about others may be found here.

== Manitoba ==
=== Peter Stevens (Winnipeg—Assiniboine) ===
Stevens was previously a candidate of the Social Credit Party of Manitoba in the 1977 provincial election. He listed himself as a manufacturer.

Electoral record
Election	District	Party	Votes	%	Place	Winner
1977 provincial	Point Douglas	Social Credit	59	1.20	5/5	Donald Malinowski, New Democratic Party
1979 federal	Winnipeg—Assiniboine	Social Credit	150		4/5	Dan McKenzie, Progressive Conservative

== See also ==
- Social Credit Party candidates, 1984 Canadian federal election
