= Little Franciscans of Mary =

The Little Franciscans of Mary (P.F.M.) is a Catholic congregation of women. Founded in Worcester, Massachusetts, the motherhouse is in Baie St. Paul, Quebec.

== Little Franciscans of Mary ==
According to a history of the order, two teachers at St. Anne's Parish in the Manchaug section of Sutton, Massachusetts asked permission from Father Alexis Delphos, pastor of St. Denis Parish in East Douglas, of which St. Anne's was a mission, to taking simple religious vows and wear the habit of the Third Order of St. Francis. Having taken the habit, they and made vows for one year and continued to teach. Shortly thereafter they were recruited by Father Joseph Brouillet, parish priest of Notre-Dame-des-Canadiens in nearby Worcester, who planned to open an orphanage, and needed a religious community to staff it. The community, founded in September 1889, adopted the Franciscan spiritual tradition. The orphanage opened in 1889 with the support of the local Canadian and Irish communities. It housed twenty orphans and two ill elderly women.

Faced with Brouillet's poor management, on the advice of friends and benefactors, on 10 September 1890 the sisters applied for incorporation under the name Sœurs Oblates de Saint-François d’Assise. The sisters were invited to Baie-Saint-Paul in Quebec by pastor Father Ambrose-Martial Fafard, to care for mentally ill patients. Father Fafard became their Father Superior, helped them form their Motherhouse, finish their novitiate, and take their vows. There they worked a farm to support their community as well as the residents of the Hospice Sainte-Anne’s, and officially became the Little Franciscans of Mary.

In August 1898 the sisters opened a school in Wallagrass, Maine. They later opened schools in Fort Kent and Eagle Lake. In 1906 they took over operation of Northern Maine General Hospital.

With the Motherhouse was in Canada, the Bishop of the Diocese off Springfield accepted them as missionaries, provided that they care for the elderly instead of orphans, which work was handed over to the Grey Nuns. A home of the elderly was established which is now the St. Francis Rehabilitation and Nursing Center.

As of 2016 the Little Franciscans of Mary work in Quebec, the United States, Madagascar, and Haiti in the fields of education, health care, social work and pastoral ministry.

== Marie Bibeau ==
Mother Marie-Anne-de-Jésus, P.F.M. (9 October 1865 – 30 April 1924) was one of the founders and the first Superior General of the Little Franciscans of Mary.

Marie Bibeau was born 9 Oct. 1865 in Sorel, Lower Canada, the daughter of Pierre and Catherine Latraverse Bibeault. Her father was a farmer. After attending the local elementary school in her village, she obtained worked as a dressmaker. Around 1887 her family emigrated to Manchaug, Massachusetts, where there was a substantial Franco-American community.

Bibeau join the fledgling community and was received as a postulant on 7 Oct. 1889. On 24 November she donned the habit and was given the name Marie-Anne-de-Jésus. In 1890 she became assistant to Sister Marie-Joseph, and put her dressmaking skills to use both in the orphanage and in making religious habits for the new novices.

Much of Bibeau's early work and the founding of the congregation took place in Worcester, Massachusetts and her contributions to the Canadian religious fabric took place largely at Baie-Saint-Paul, Quebec, which is also the site of the motherhouse.

== Sources ==
- "Little Franciscans of Mary". Dictionary of Canadian Biography (online ed.). University of Toronto Press. 1979–2016.
- "Little Franciscans of Mary"
