= Thomas Hambly Ross =

Canadian politician

Thomas Hambly Ross (February 25, 1886 – November 20, 1956) was a Canadian politician.

Born in Woodstock, Ontario, Ross was first elected in the 1940 election as the Liberal Member of Parliament for Hamilton East, receiving 47.4% of the vote and defeating Conservative incumbent Albert Brown. He was re-elected in the 1945 election, with a significantly reduced plurality of 37.5%.

With his third election in 1949, Ross received 39.9%. His final election in 1953 saw Ross returned to Ottawa with 45.2% of the vote.

Sam Lawrence Park can be found on the western-end of Concession Street. Prior to 1944, this property was the Webb Quarry. In February 1944, The City of Hamilton was given 3 acres (12,000 m^{2}) of land for park use by Thomas Hambly Ross, MP (Hamilton East), and his wife Olive. The park was originally named Ross Park, then renamed Patton Park in 1946, in honour of captain John MacMillan Stevenson Patton, a Hamiltonian who risked his life during World War II by detonating an unexploded bomb. For this exploit he received the first George Cross for Valour. In 1960, the park was renamed to honour Sam Lawrence. During 1990 to 1994, Sam Lawrence Park underwent a major upgrading that included repairing the stone walls, installing new walkways, site lighting, site furniture, and the redevelopment of the major rock gardens.

Preceded by Albert A. Brown (Con)	Member of Parliament for Hamilton East; 1940–1957	Succeeded by Quinto Martini (PC)
