= John Patton (GC) =

Canadian Army officer (1915–1996)

John MacMillan Stevenson Patton
- Born: 29 August 1915; Warwick, Bermuda
- Died: 13 May 1996 (aged 80); Warwick, Bermuda
- Military career
- Allegiance: Canada
- Branch: Canadian Army
- Rank: Captain
- Unit: Corps of Royal Canadian Engineers
- Conflicts: World War II
- Awards: George Cross

John MacMillan Stevenson Patton, GC, CBE (29 August 1915 – 13 May 1996) was a Canadian Army officer, and the only Bermuda-born British person to be awarded the George Cross. He was raised in Burlington and Hamilton, Ontario.

== World War II ==
At the height of the Battle of Britain when the Hurricane was the principal British fighter aircraft, Lieutenant Patton was a chemical engineering officer in the 1st Battalion, Corps of Royal Canadian Engineers, recently arrived in Britain and based at Box Hill, near Dorking, Surrey. On 21 September, at 8.30 am when he was leading a team clearing debris at the bomb-damaged Vickers-Armstrongs aircraft factory at Brooklands near Weybridge, a lone Luftwaffe Junkers Ju 88 attacked the Hawker Hurricane factory on the South-West side of Brooklands. Two of the three bombs dropped failed to explode and, despite having no previous experience of bomb disposal, Patton soon attended the scene. One unexploded bomb was buried under part of the factory floor but another had passed through the main building and ended up on an adjacent hardstanding. Patton decided that the unexploded bomb had to be removed as soon as possible before it damaged the vital factory, so with the help of four others (including his adjutant Captain Douglas W C Cunnington and Vickers Home Guard Section Leader A H Tilyard-Burrows ), he rolled it onto a sheet of corrugated iron and secured it to the back of a 15cwt truck. While Patton sat on the tailgate of the lorry to watch over the bomb, Cunnington towed the bomb out onto the aerodrome where it was then rolled very carefully into an existing bomb crater where it subsequently exploded harmlessly the next morning. Patton was awarded the George Cross for his bravery (Cunnington and Tilyard-Burrows were awarded the George Medal) and subsequently served in India and Burma fighting against the Japanese.

== Post-war ==
After the war he received Canadian citizenship as a result of his participation with the Royal Canadian Engineers. He was also made an Honorary Member of the Royal Engineers Bomb Disposal Association.

== Recognition ==
In February 1944, the City of Hamilton was given 3 acres (1.2 ha) of land for park use by Thomas Hambly Ross, MP (Hamilton East), and his wife Olive. This park was originally named Ross Park but was renamed Patton Park in 1946, in honour of Captain John MacMillan Stevenson Patton. In 1960, the park was again renamed to honour Samuel Lawrence. From 1990 to 1994, Sam Lawrence Park saw a major upgrading that included repairing stone walls, installing new walkways, lighting, site furniture, and redevelopment of the major rock gardens. Sam Lawrence Park can be found on the western-end of Concession Street in Hamilton, Ontario. Prior to 1944, this property was the Webb Quarry.

== Bibliography ==
- Flower, Stephen (1994) 'Raiders Overhead – The German Air Operations Over the Weybridge Area in Two World Wars' (Air Research Publications, Walton-on-Thames, Surrey, ISBN 1-871187-18-4);
- Parry, Simon (2007) 'War-Torn Skies of Great Britain – Surrey in the Battle of Britain' (Red Kite Books, Walton-on-Thames, Surrey, ISBN 978-0-9554735-0-0);
