= By-elections to the 29th Alberta Legislature =

By-elections to the 29th Alberta Legislature were held to fill vacancies in the Legislative Assembly of Alberta after the 2015 election. Two by-elections were held to fill vacancies in the 29th Alberta Legislature.

The 29th Alberta Legislature was formed after the 2015 election, during which the New Democrats won their first majority government under the leadership of Rachel Notley. Three by-elections were held in ridings which were initially won by the Progressive Conservatives, and these returned one Wildrose, one Progressive Conservative, and one United Conservative member each to the legislature. Two held in ridings initially won by Wildrose returned United Conservative members.

== Summary table ==
By-election	Date	Incumbent	Party	Winner	Party	Cause	Retained
Fort McMurray-Conklin	July 12, 2018	Brian Jean	United Conservative	Laila Goodridge	United Conservative	Resigned several months after losing the UCP leadership election to Jason Kenney	Yes
Innisfail-Sylvan Lake	July 12, 2018	Don MacIntyre	United Conservative	Devin Dreeshen	United Conservative	Resigned after being charged with sexual interference with a minor	Yes
Calgary-Lougheed	December 14, 2017	Dave Rodney	United Conservative	Jason Kenney	United Conservative	Resigned to provide a seat for new UCP leader Jason Kenney	Yes
Calgary-Greenway	March 22, 2016	Manmeet Bhullar	Progressive Conservative	Prabhdeep Gill	Progressive Conservative	Killed in highway accident	Yes
Calgary-Foothills	September 3, 2015	Jim Prentice	Progressive Conservative	Prasad Panda	Wildrose	Disclaimed seat and resigned as party leader following government's defeat in general election	No

== Fort McMurray-Conklin ==
There was a by-election in Fort McMurray-Conklin due to the March 5, 2018 resignation of United Conservative Party MLA and former Wildrose Party leader Brian Jean. The by-election was held on July 12, 2018.

Alberta provincial by-election, July 12, 2018: Fort McMurray-Conklin Upon the resignation of Brian Jean on March 5, 2018
Party	Candidate	Votes	%	±%
United Conservative	Laila Goodridge	2,689	67.02	+0.84
New Democratic	Jane Stroud	1,149	28.64	-2.15
Alberta Party	Sid Fayed	103	2.57	–
Liberal	Robin Le Fevre	42	1.05	-1.99
Green	Brian Deheer	29	0.72	–
Total valid votes		4,012	99.50	–
Rejected, spoiled and declined		20	0.50	-0.40
Turnout		4,032	32.59	-11.85
Eligible electors		12,370		
United Conservative notional hold		Swing		+1.50
Source(s) Elections Alberta. "Election results".

^ UCP change is compared to combined Wildrose and Progressive Conservative

== Innisfail-Sylvan Lake ==
There was a by-election in Innisfail-Sylvan Lake due to United Conservative Party MLA Don MacIntyre's sudden resignation on February 5, 2018 after he was charged with sexual assault and "sexual interference" (i.e., touching a minor for a sexual purpose). The by-election was held on July 12, 2018.

Alberta provincial by-election, July 12, 2018: Innisfail-Sylvan Lake upon the resignation of Don MacIntyre on February 2, 2018
Party	Candidate	Votes	%	±%
United Conservative	Devin Dreeshen	8,029	81.67	+10.99
New Democratic	Nicole Mooney	915	9.31	-13.83
Alberta Party	Abigail Douglass	731	7.44	+1.25
Liberal	Nicolaas Jansen	93	0.95	—
Independent	David Inscho	63	0.64	—
Total valid votes		9,831		
Rejected, spoiled, and declined		37		
Turnout		9,868	31.22	-24.27
Eligible voters		31,604		
United Conservative notional hold		Swing		+12.41
Source(s) Elections Alberta. "Election results".

== Calgary-Lougheed ==
The by-election was held when Dave Rodney resigned his seat on November 1, 2017 to make way for Jason Kenney, the leader of the newly-formed United Conservative Party. Kenney ended up winning the by-election and held the seat for the United Conservative Party.

Alberta provincial by-election, December 14, 2017: Calgary-Lougheed upon the resignation of Dave Rodney on November 1, 2017
Party	Candidate	Votes	%	±%
United Conservative	Jason Kenney	7,760	71.51	+8.35 (Note: Swing is calculated from the sum of Progressive Conservative and Wildrose vote shares.)
New Democratic	Phillip van der Merwe	1,822	16.79	-15.24
Liberal	David Khan	1,009	9.30	+4.49
Reform	Lauren Thorsteinson	137	1.26	
Green	Romy Tittel	60	0.55	
Independent	Wayne Leslie	42	0.39	
Independent	Larry Heather	22	0.20	
Total valid votes		10,852	98.84	
Rejected, spoiled and declined		127	1.16	-0.30
Eligible voters / turnout		31,067	35.34	-16.01
United Conservative notional hold		Swing		+11.80
Source(s) Elections Alberta. "Election Results: Calgary-Lougheed".

== Calgary-Greenway ==
The riding of Calgary-Greenway was left vacant on November 23, 2015, when incumbent Progressive Conservative MLA Manmeet Bhullar was killed in a vehicle accident on Alberta Highway 2. The resulting by-election was won by Prabhdeep Gill of the Progressive Conservatives.

The by-election resulted in a Progressive Conservative hold, but saw the vote share for that party drop by 15 points from the 2015 election.

Alberta provincial by-election, March 22, 2016: Calgary-Greenway upon the death of Manmeet Bhullar on November 23, 2015
Party	Candidate	Votes	%	±%
Progressive Conservative	Prabhdeep Gill	2,292	27.73	-15.04
Wildrose	Devinder Toor	1,957	23.68	+2.62
Liberal	Khalil Karbani	1,870	22.63	-
New Democratic	Roop Rai	1,667	20.17	-16.00
Green	Thana Boonlert	166	2.01	-
Independent	Said Hussein Abdulbaki	146	1.77	-
Independent	Larry Heather	106	1.28	-
Independent	Sukhi Rai	61	0.74	-
Total valid votes		8,265	100.00	
Total rejected, unmarked and declined ballots				
Turnout			29.23	
Eligible voters		28,278		
Progressive Conservative hold		Swing		-8.83

== Calgary-Foothills ==
Following the Alberta Progressive Conservatives' defeat in the 2015 provincial election, outgoing premier Jim Prentice announced on election night that even though he had personally won re-election in Calgary-Foothills, he was resigning his seat in the legislature. This had the effect of voiding the election result, and necessitated the calling of a by-election to fill the seat.

The by-election to succeed him was scheduled for September 3, 2015, and was won by Prasad Panda of the Wildrose Party. Panda's victory increased the Wildrose caucus to 22 members in the Legislature, and kept the Progressive Conservatives at 9.

Alberta provincial by-election, September 3, 2015: Calgary-Foothills Voiding of general election results due to Jim Prentice disclaiming his seat
Party	Candidate	Votes	%	±%
Wildrose	Prasad Panda	4,877	38.35	+20.24
New Democratic	Bob Hawkesworth	3,270	25.71	-6.65
Progressive Conservative	Blair Houston	2,746	21.59	-18.74
Liberal	Ali Bin Zahid	791	6.22	-0.94
Alberta Party	Mark Taylor	610	4.80	+4.80
Green	Janet Keeping	377	2.96	+0.92
Independent	Antoni Grochowski	46	0.36	–
Total valid votes		12,717		
Total rejected, unmarked and declined ballots				
Turnout			39.48	
Eligible voters		32,212		
Wildrose gain from Progressive Conservative		Swing		+19.49
