= Devin Dreeshen =

Canadian politician (born 1987/88)

The Honourable Devin Dreeshen ECA MLA
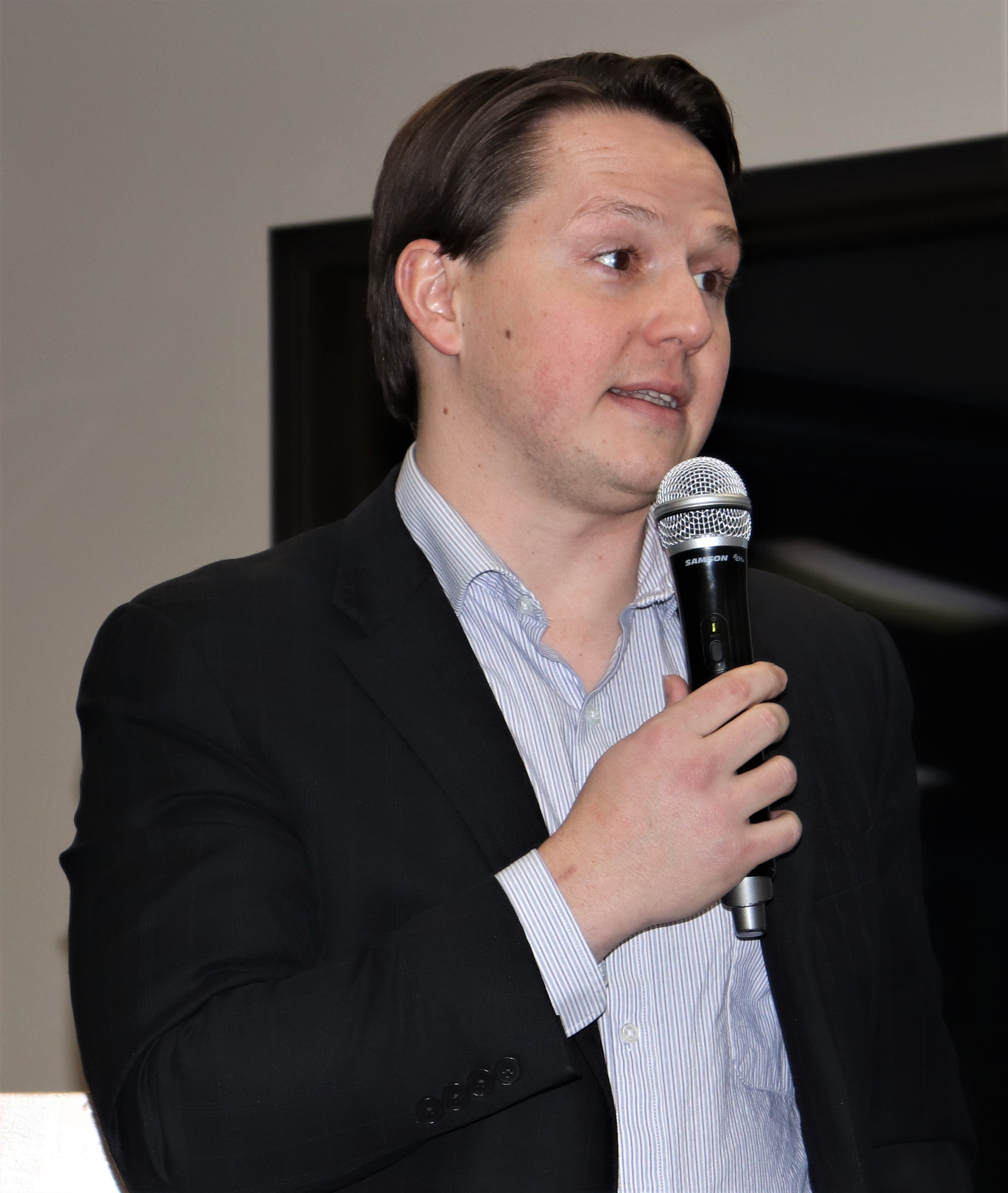

Minister of Transportation and Economic Corridors
- Incumbent
- Assumed office October 21, 2022
- Premier: Danielle Smith
- Preceded by: Rajan Sawhney

Minister of Agriculture and Forestry of Alberta
- In office April 30, 2019 – November 5, 2021
- Premier: Jason Kenney
- Preceded by: Oneil Carlier
- Succeeded by: Nate Horner

Member of the Legislative Assembly of Alberta for Innisfail-Sylvan Lake
- Incumbent
- Assumed office July 12, 2018
- Preceded by: Don MacIntyre

Personal details
- Born: 1987 or 1988 (age 38–39) Innisfail, Alberta, Canada
- Party: United Conservative
- Relations: Earl Dreeshen (father)
- Education: University of Alberta

Devin Dreeshen (born 1987/1988) is a Canadian politician and a member of the Legislative Assembly of Alberta, representing the electoral district of Innisfail-Sylvan Lake. He was first elected with 82 per cent of the vote in a by-election in July 2018, and was re-elected in the 2019 Alberta general election to the 30th Alberta Legislature. In the 2023 Alberta general election, Dreeshen was once again re-elected to the 31st Alberta Legislature.

As a member of the United Conservative Party government, on April 30, 2019, Dreeshen was appointed by Premier Jason Kenney to the Executive Council of Alberta as the Minister of Agriculture and Forestry. He served in that role from April 30, 2019, to November 5, 2021. Dreeshen has been Alberta's Minister of Transportation and Economic Corridors since October 2022.

== Early life ==
Dreeshen was born in Innisfail, Alberta to a family who has farmed in Alberta for multiple generations. His father, Earl Dreeshen, is a Conservative member of parliament for Red Deer—Mountain View, first elected in 2008. He grew up with his sister Megan.

Before entering politics himself, Dreeshen studied economics and political science at the University of Alberta. He was also a former director of the Western Canadian Wheat Growers Association, and a board member on the Crossroads Agricultural Society.

From 2008 until 2015, Dreeshen worked as a policy advisor to Minister of Agriculture Gerry Ritz.

== Political career ==
=== Donald Trump presidential campaign ===
Between February and November 2016 Dreeshen worked on Donald Trump's presidential campaign. Dreeshen visited 28 states and shadowed Ivanka Trump. As a result of his work, Dreeshen was invited to the Trump's victory party in New York City, where he was photographed wearing a red MAGA hat. His former press secretary, Justin Laurence, said in an email that the Minister denounced all forms of political violence during the 2021 storming of the United States Capitol.

=== Minister of Agriculture and Forestry ===
Dreeshen won the United Conservative nomination for Innisfail-Sylvan Lake in 2018, and won the ensuing by-election with approximately 82 per cent of the vote. He was appointed by Jason Kenney as the Opposition Critic for Trade and was a member on the Standing Committee on Alberta's Economic Future. After winning reelection in the 2019 Alberta general election, he was appointed as the Minister of Agriculture and Forestry.

On May 5, 2020, the government of Alberta formed an Agriculture Industry Advisory Committee to work with Minister Dreeshen, with the goal of providing the Ministry of Agriculture and Forestry with strategic advice and recommendations on issues and priorities related to consumer confidence and work to debunk myths in the industry. “Alberta has a hard-earned reputation around the world for healthy, safe and reliable agriculture products,” said Minister of Agriculture and Forestry Devin Dreeshen, “These Champions of Agriculture will help break down myths and misunderstandings of our sustainable agriculture practices and highlight how Alberta leads on a global stage to feed people around the world.”

In August 2020 the government of Alberta with Dreeshen as Minister of Agriculture and Forestry, amended the Meat Inspection Act, to allow consumers to buy an animal directly from farmers, and have it slaughtered for their personal consumption. It also allowed for provincially licensed slaughterhouses to sell meat byproducts and allowed emergency video pre slaughter inspections for the sake of animal welfare.

On April 13, 2020, the union representing employees of the Cargill meat processing plant called for the plant to be shut down due to 38 confirmed cases of COVID-19 among plant workers. On April 16, Rachel Notley called on Dreeshen and the provincial government to shut down the plant; Dreeshen responded, calling her statement "misinformation and fear-mongering." During a virtual town hall meeting on April 18, Dreeshen said that the government was confident the Cargill plant had taken all necessary measures to mitigate risk to its staff, including temperature testing, enhanced cleaning and sanitizing, disallowing visitation, installing plastic dividers, and implementing staggered breaks. By April 20, 484 cases had been linked to the Cargill plant outbreak, at which point the plant closed for two weeks. On May 11, after the plant had reopened, NDP labour critic Christina Gray called on Dreeshen to close the plant again, but the plant remained open. Three deaths were linked with the outbreak at the Cargill plant, and at more than 1500 confirmed cases, it was the largest outbreak of COVID-19 in Canada.

Documents obtained by the Alberta Federation of Labour in March 2021 they believe showed that Dreeshen was aware that the safety measures taken by the plant were not sufficient to ensure worker safety, but deliberately omitted the information at the town hall meeting with plant workers. Minister Dreeshen’s former press secretary gave a statement to Global News. Justin Laurence said the government ensured personal protective equipment was provided to protect both workers and the food security of Alberta families. “Alberta’s government followed the expert medical advice of its officials, including chief medical officer of Health Dr. Hinshaw who, at no time, recommend the closure of food processing plants,” Laurence said.

On July 10, 2021, Dreeshen showcased new " Made in Alberta" product labels developed by the government that farmers, food producers and processors could place on their products to help consumers quickly notice and choose items made in Alberta at farmers markets and grocery stores.

In October 2021, the CBC reported that a former UCP staff member was suing the premier's office alleging excessive drinking by ministers and staff in legislature offices. Although, none of the allegations were ever proven in court, Dreeshen resigned from cabinet. Dreeshen offered Premier Jason Kenney his resignation from cabinet on November 5, 2021. “I accept that my personal conduct with regards to alcohol has become an issue for the government as a whole,” the statement said, “I deeply regret that this is the case, but have decided that it is best for both myself and the province to resign my position and focus on my personal health and wellness.”

=== Minister of Transportation and Economic Corridors ===
Dreeshen was sworn in as Minister of Transportation and Economic Corridors on October 24, 2022. As Minister he intends to continue the twinning of Highway 11 from Sylvan Lake to Rocky Mountain House. The expansion of Red Deer Regional Airport is stated as a priority as well. Dreeshen met with the airport authority and told them the development of the airport remains part of the province’s strategy to bring in more trade and attract more businesses. In the 2023 budget, the Alberta government with Dreeshen as Minister, invested $30 million into the expansion and upgrade of Red Deer Regional Airport. The government also planned to spend $23 billion dollars over three years on public infrastructure, including $2.293 billion on roads from 2023-2026.

In northern Alberta, Minister Dreeshen also announced $117 million to twin Highway 63 from Mildred Lake to south of the Peter Lougheed Bridge, which sees nearly 11,000 commuters and commercial vehicles daily. The project was initiated in response to the rapid and sustained growth in industrial activity north of Fort McMurray and a corresponding increase in traffic volumes. On April 27, 2023, Minister Dreeshen also announced a major agreement with Loon River First Nation, Peerless Trout First Nation and Bigstone Cree Nation to begin work to extend Highway 686 to Fort McMurray, connecting northeastern and northwestern Alberta for the first time in the history of the province.

=== Alberta separatism ===
On June 5, 2026, Primer Danielle Smith issued a pledge to vote against the 2026 independence referendum urging her ministers to do so as well. However, Dreeshen refused to comment if he would be voting for or against Independence becoming the first minister to do so. Dreeshen's district is one of the pro-independence hotspots.

== Electoral results ==
=== 2023 general election ===
2023 Alberta general election: Innisfail-Sylvan Lake
Party	Candidate	Votes	%	±%
United Conservative	Devin Dreeshen	16,385	71.61	-2.94
New Democratic	Jason Heistad	5,700	24.91	+11.38
Alberta Independence	David Reid	276	1.21	–
Wildrose Independence	Jeevan Mangat	240	1.05	–
Solidarity Movement	Brandon Pringle	149	0.65	–
Reform	Randy Thorsteinson	132	0.58	+0.27
Total		22,882	99.42	–
Rejected and declined		134	0.58	
Turnout		23,016	61.38	
Eligible voters		37,497		
United Conservative hold		Swing		-7.16
Source(s) Source: Elections Alberta

=== 2019 general election ===
2019 Alberta general election: Innisfail-Sylvan Lake
Party	Candidate	Votes	%	±%
United Conservative	Devin Dreeshen	19,030	74.55%	-7.12%
New Democratic	Robyn O'Brien	3,453	13.53%	4.22%
Alberta Party	Danielle Klooster	2,337	9.15%	1.71%
Freedom Conservative	Chad Miller	359	1.41%	–
Alberta Advantage	Brian Vanderkley	164	0.64%	–
Independent	Ed Wychopen	106	0.42%	–
Reform	Lauren Thorsteinson	79	0.31%	–
Total		25,528	–	–
Rejected, spoiled and declined		31	57	10
Eligible electors / turnout		34,873	73.32%	17.93%
United Conservative gain from Wildrose		Swing		23.17%
Source(s) Source: "66 - Innisfail-Sylvan Lake, 2019 Alberta general election". officialresults.elections.ab.ca. Elections Alberta. Alberta. Chief Electoral Officer (2019). 2019 General Election. A Report of the Chief Electoral Officer. Volume II (PDF) (Report). Vol. 2. Edmonton, Alta.: Elections Alberta. pp. 302–308. ISBN 978-1-988620-12-1.

=== 2018 by-election ===
Alberta provincial by-election, July 12, 2018: Innisfail-Sylvan Lake upon the resignation of Don MacIntyre on February 2, 2018
Party	Candidate	Votes	%	±%
United Conservative	Devin Dreeshen	8,029	81.67	+10.99
New Democratic	Nicole Mooney	915	9.31	-13.83
Alberta Party	Abigail Douglass	731	7.44	+1.25
Liberal	Nicolaas Jansen	93	0.95	—
Independent	David Inscho	63	0.64	—
Total valid votes		9,831		
Rejected, spoiled, and declined		37		
Turnout		9,868	31.22	-24.27
Eligible voters		31,604		
United Conservative notional hold		Swing		+12.41
Source(s) Elections Alberta. "Election results".

Alberta provincial government of Jason Kenney
Cabinet post (1)
Predecessor	Office	Successor
Oneil Carlier	Minister of Agriculture and Forestry; April 30, 2019–November 5, 2021	Nate Horner
