= Robert N. Thompson =

Canadian politician (1914–1997)

Robert N. Thompson OC
- Official 1968 portrait

Leader of the Social Credit Party of Canada
- In office July 7, 1961 – March 9, 1967
- Preceded by: Solon Earl Low
- Succeeded by: Alexander Bell Patterson (acting)

Member of Parliament for Red Deer
- In office June 18, 1962 – October 30, 1972
- Preceded by: Harris George Rogers
- Succeeded by: Gordon Towers

Personal details
- Born: Robert Norman Thompson; May 17, 1914 Duluth, Minnesota, U.S.
- Died: November 16, 1997 (aged 83) Fort Langley, British Columbia, Canada
- Party: Progressive Conservative (1967–1972); Social Credit (1935–1967)
- Spouse: Hazel Kurth Thompson
- Occupation: Politician; chiropractor; educator

Robert Norman Thompson OC (May 17, 1914 – November 16, 1997) was a Canadian politician, chiropractor, and educator. He was born in Duluth, Minnesota, to Canadian parents and moved to Canada in 1918 with his family. Raised in Alberta, he graduated from the Palmer School of Chiropractic in 1939 and worked as a chiropractor and then as a teacher before serving in the Royal Canadian Air Force during World War II.

== Early life ==
Thompson was born in Duluth, the son of Hannah (Olufson) and Theodore O. Thompson. His family was Lutheran, of Norwegian descent. Thompson supported the Social Credit Party of Alberta from its creation. His age prevented him from running as a candidate in the 1935 provincial election. Instead he became youth leader of the party.

== Ethiopia ==
In 1944, Thompson was sent to Ethiopia to serve as the founding commander of the Imperial Ethiopian Air Force and head up nation's air force academy. He became a confidant of Emperor Haile Selassie I and, after the war, became deputy minister of education and helped to rebuild the nation's public school system.

== Return to Canada and Social Credit ==
Thompson returned to Canada in 1958 and resumed his activities with Social Credit. He soon became president of the national Social Credit Party of Canada and did much to rebuild the party after it was shut out of Parliament in the massive Progressive Conservative (PC) landslide of 1958.

Alberta Premier Ernest Manning saw Thompson as the ideal person to succeed Solon Low as leader of the Social Credit Party of Canada and backed him in a hotly-contested leadership vote against Réal Caouette, the movement's leader in Quebec, which was won by Thompson. Years later, Caouette claimed that he would have won, but Manning told him to tell the Quebec delegates to vote for Thompson because the West would never accept a francophone Catholic as party leader.

Under Thompson's leadership, the Socreds returned to the Commons in the 1962 federal election. Thompson himself was elected from Red Deer, Alberta. However, he was one of only four Socreds elected from English Canada, and 26 came from Quebec led by Caouette. Under the circumstances, Thompson was all but forced to name Caouette as the party's deputy leader. Thompson was re-elected in the 1963 and 1965 elections.

The 1962, 1963, and 1965 elections produced minority parliaments in which no one party had a majority of seats (the PCs won the largest plurality in the first election, the Liberals in the other two). That meant that the government had to rely on smaller parties such as Social Credit to pass legislation and remain in power.

== Divisions ==
The Social Credit Party was sharply divided after 1962. Most Socred MPs came from Quebec and regarded Caouette as their leader. The number of Socreds from English Canada was declining, as was made sharply clear at the 1962 election. Additionally, the party's English wing, including Thompson, had largely abandoned social credit theory in favour of fiscal conservatism. In contrast, Caouette and other Quebec Socreds still held fast to the theory.

Despite the massive linguistic imbalance in his caucus, Thompson refused to cede the leadership of the party to Caouette. That caused the party to split, and most of the party's Quebec MPs followed Caouette into his new Ralliement créditiste in 1963.

== Move to the Progressive Conservatives ==
Thompson was frustrated by the lack of support that the national party enjoyed from the provincial Social Credit parties in Alberta and British Columbia, where they formed the governments and ran powerful political machines. Additionally, Manning was becoming concerned with the leftward trajectory of both the federal Liberals and the Progressive Conservatives. He encouraged Thompson to try to bring about a merger of the federal Social Credit and Progressive Conservative parties.

Negotiations failed, but with the backing of both Manning and Robert Stanfield, Thompson decided to cross the floor to the PCs in hopes of influencing that party. He resigned as leader of Social Credit in March 1967 by citing the lack of support for the federal Social Credit Party from its provincial wings. He then sought the Progressive Conservative nomination for his old seat. Despite vehement opposition from the local riding association, he won the nomination and was re-elected in 1968.

== British Columbia ==
Prior to the 1972 election, Thompson moved to British Columbia to teach and tried to win a seat from that province, Surrey—White Rock but was defeated in his attempt. He retired from politics and taught political science at Trinity Western University in British Columbia through the 1970s. At various times he also served as chairman of the university's board of governors and vice president of development at the school.

In the late 1980s, Thompson was on the executive board of the World Anti-Communist League.

In his last years, Thompson was instrumental in bringing the former Emperor Haile Sellassie's children out of Ethiopia and to safety in the west after the 1974 Ethiopian Revolution. His intervention probably saved them from death.

== Quote ==
''The Americans are our best friends, whether we like it or not.''

== Books ==
- Canadians, It's Time You Knew!, Robert N. Thompson. 1965.
- Commonsense for Canadians, Robert N. Thompson. 1965.
- A Christian Voice from the Marketplace, Robert N. Thompson. 1979.
- Liberation: The First to Be Freed, Robert N. Thompson. 1987.
- The House of Minorities, Robert N. Thompson. 1990.

== Archives ==
There is a Robert Norman Thompson fonds at Library and Archives Canada. Archival reference number is R7105. There is also a fonds at Trinity Western University Archives.

Parliament of Canada
Preceded by Harris George Rogers	Member of Parliament Red Deer; 1962–1972	Succeeded by Gordon Towers
