= Harris George Rogers =

Canadian politician

Harris Rogers

Member of Parliament for Red Deer
- In office 1958–1962
- Preceded by: Frederick Davis Shaw
- Succeeded by: Robert N. Thompson

Personal details
- Born: August 31, 1891 Newton Robinson, Ontario, Canada
- Died: July 28, 1977 (aged 85) Red Deer, Alberta, Canada
- Party: Progressive Conservative Party of Canada
- Spouse: Gladys Himsworth Rogers (nee' Cronkhite)
- Children: Aleen, Elizabeth (Beth), Doug, Kent
- Occupation: Farmer, soldier

Major Harris George Rogers (August 31, 1891 – July 28, 1977) was a farmer and a soldier in both World War I and World War II and served as a Canadian federal politician from 1958 to 1962.

== Military career ==
First World War

Rogers joined the 175th Battalion, Canadian Expeditionary Force in 1916 and served overseas as a Lieutenant with the 31st Battalion, Canadian Expeditionary Force from 1916 to 1918. He was wounded twice (Passchendale and Last hundred days) and earned the Military Cross: "He made many daylight reconnaissances and brought back valuable information under heavy fire. During an attack on a village he led his company with gallantry and skill driving back the enemy outposts with heavy casualties, and the village was eventually captured. He was finally severely wounded by machine-gun fire. He set a very fine example to his men."

Second World War

Rogers served with the Royal Canadian Army Service Corps during the Second World War and was Officer Commanding of the 6th Divisional Petrol Company which saw service throughout Canada prior to serving in a defensive role on the West Coast of Canada until 1943.

== Federal politics ==
Rogers first ran for a seat in the House of Commons of Canada as a candidate in the Alberta riding of Red Deer for the Progressive Conservatives in the 1957 Canadian federal election. He was defeated by incumbent Frederick Davis Shaw. Harris would run against Shaw 1 year later in the 1958 Canadian federal election this time winning in a landslide. He would serve one term in Parliament before being defeated by Robert N. Thompson in the 1962 Canadian federal election.
