= Frederick Davis Shaw =

Canadian politician

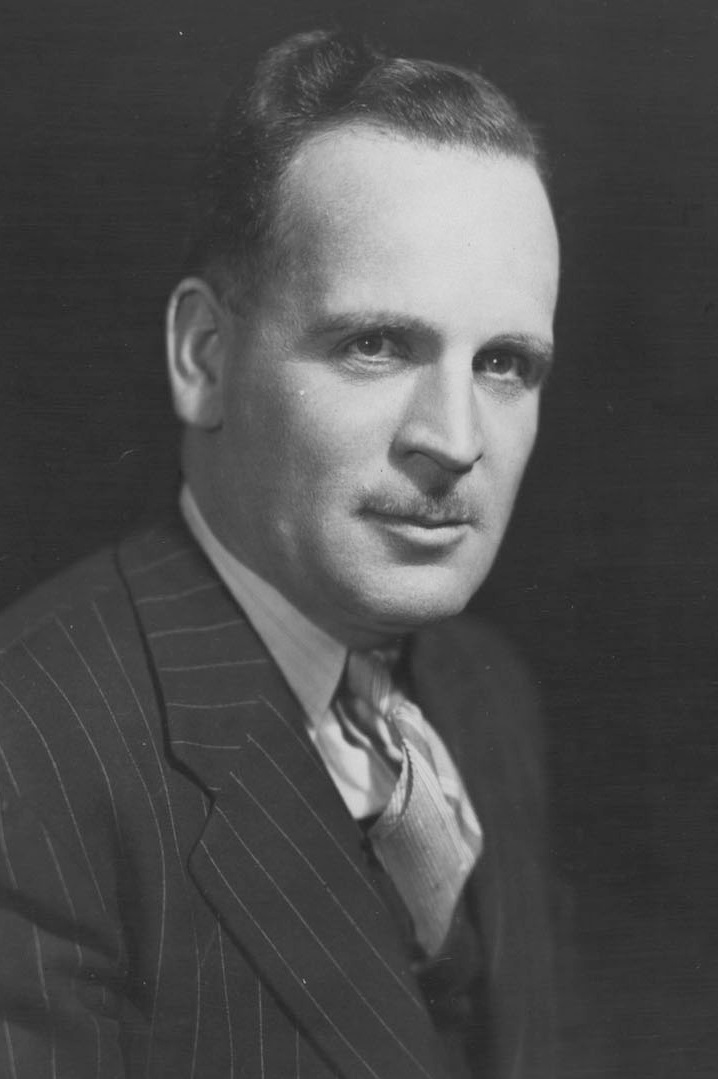

Member of Parliament for Red Deer
- In office 1940–1958
- Preceded by: Alfred Speakman
- Succeeded by: Harris George Rogers

Personal details
- Born: August 4, 1909 Cardston, Alberta, Canada
- Died: December 9, 1977 (aged 68)
- Party: Social Credit Party of Canada

Frederick Davis Shaw (August 4, 1909 – December 9, 1977) was a Canadian politician who served in Parliament.

Shaw was first elected to the House of Commons of Canada in the 1940 federal election, in the electoral district of Red Deer under the banner of the Social Credit Party. He was re-elected in 1945, 1949, 1953 and 1957. In the 1958 election he was defeated by Progressive Conservative candidate Harris Rogers.

After his defeat Shaw moved to British Columbia, where he tried twice to re-enter Parliament. He stood as the Social Credit candidate in the federal elections of 1962 and 1963 in the electoral district of Okanagan Boundary against incumbent Progressive Conservative Member of Parliament David Vaughan Pugh. He was defeated both times.

"Jack" as he was known, was married to Eva. They had three sons, Douglas, Donald and Frederick Jr., and a daughter Patricia born on the day of Queen Elizabeth's coronation, June 2, 1953.
