= Luke Ouellette =

Canadian politician

The Honourable Luke Ouellette ECA

Member of the Legislative Assembly of Alberta for Innisfail-Sylvan Lake
- In office March 12, 2001 – April 23, 2012
- Preceded by: Gary Severtson
- Succeeded by: Kerry Towle

Personal details
- Born: July 22, 1953 (age 72) St. Paul, Alberta
- Party: Progressive Conservative
- Occupation: consultant

Lucien "Luke" Ouellette ECA (born July 22, 1953) is a Canadian politician and former Member of the Legislative Assembly of Alberta representing the constituency of Innisfail-Sylvan Lake as a Progressive Conservative.

== Early life ==
Ouellette was born July 22, 1953, in St. Paul and grew up on a farm in St. Lina. He has owned several small business and worked as an oil field consultant.

== Political career ==
Ouellette was elected for his third term in the 2008 provincial election. He formerly served as Minister of Transportation. Ouellette received a mandate from Premier Ed Stelmach to double provincial investment in highway repaving and bridge repair over three years.

Transportation is Ouellette's third ministerial portfolio. During his second term, he was appointed first by then-Premier Ralph Klein as Minister of Restructuring and Government Efficiency. When Premier Ed Stelmach took over leadership of the Cabinet in December 2006, he made Ouellette the new Minister of Infrastructure and Transportation. He served in that capacity until March 12, 2008.

Ouellette was first elected in the 2001 provincial election. In addition to his role as a minister, he has been a member of numerous committees, including vice-chair of Climate Change Central and co-chair of the MLA Steering Committee for Rural Development.

== Personal life ==
Ouellette has volunteered for many organizations in his community, including the Pine Lake Hub Centre, Crossroads Agricultural Society, YWCA in Lethbridge, Pine Lake Agricultural Park, former director of the Pine Lake Restoration Society, former co-chair of Clean Lake Days in Pine Lake and STARS Ambulance. He has coached minor baseball.

== Election results ==
2008 Alberta general election results ( Innisfail-Sylvan Lake )		Turnout 40.9%	
Affiliation	Candidate	Votes	%
Progressive Conservative	Luke Ouellette	6,967	62.8%
Liberal	Garth Davis	1,539	13.9%
Wildrose Alliance	Wayne Edmondson	1,215	11.0%
Green	Lisa Grant	545	4.9%
NDP	Tophie Davis	702	6.3%
2004 Alberta general election results ( Innisfail-Sylvan Lake )		Turnout 46.7%	
Affiliation	Candidate	Votes	%
Progressive Conservative	Luke Ouellette	6,208	55.4%
Liberal	Garth Davis	1,817	16.2%
Alberta Alliance	Randy Thorsteinson	2,241	20.0%
New Democratic	Chris Janke	585	5.2%
Social Credit	Wilf Tricker	359	3.2%
2001 Alberta general election results ( Innisfail-Sylvan Lake )		Turnout 54.4%	
Affiliation	Candidate	Votes	%
Progressive Conservative	Luke Ouellette	9,725	74.6%
Liberal	Garth Davis	2,652	20.4%
NDP	Eileen Clancy Teslenko	651	5.0%

2012 Alberta general election: Innisfail-Sylvan Lake
Party	Candidate	Votes	%	±%
Wildrose	Kerry Towle	7,084	46.22	+35.26
Progressive Conservative	Luke Ouellette	6,140	40.06	-22.76
Alberta Party	Danielle Klooster	747	4.87	
New Democratic	Patricia Norman	715	4.66	-1.67
Liberal	Les Vidok	642	4.19	-9.69
Total		15,328	99.22	
Rejected, spoiled, and declined		120	0.78	
Turnout		15,488	54.84	
Eligible voters		28,167		
Wildrose gain from Progressive Conservative		Swing		+29.01
Source(s) Elections Alberta. "Electoral Division Results, 64 - INNISFAIL-SYLVAN LAKE".
