= Douglas Fee =

Canadian politician

Member of Parliament for Red Deer
- In office 1988–1993
- Preceded by: Gordon Towers
- Succeeded by: Bob Mills

Personal details
- Born: 21 July 1944 (age 81) Kingston, Ontario, Canada
- Party: Progressive Conservative Party of Canada
- Occupation: educator

Douglas Fee (born 21 July 1944) was a member of the House of Commons of Canada from 1988 to 1993. His background was in education and human resources.

He was elected in the 1988 federal election at the Red Deer electoral district for the Progressive Conservative party. He served in the 34th Canadian Parliament but lost to Bob Mills of the Reform Party in the 1993 federal election.

After losing the 1993 seat, Fee became the CEO of the Canadian Angus Association in 1994. Under his leadership, the Association membership has doubled in number and registrations have almost tripled.
