= Red Deer (federal electoral district) =

Federal electoral district in Alberta, Canada

Coordinates: 52.28°N 113.80°W

Alberta electoral district
- Interactive map of riding boundaries since the 2025 federal election

Federal electoral district
- Legislature: House of Commons
MP
Burton Bailey
Conservative
- District created: 1907
- First contested: 1908
- Last contested: 2025
- District webpage: profile, map

Demographics
- Population (2021): 115,044
- Census division: Division No. 8
- Census subdivision(s): Red Deer, Red Deer County (part), Penhold, Delburne, Elnora

Red Deer is a federal electoral district in Alberta, Canada, represented in the House of Commons of Canada from 1908 to 2015 and since 2025.

== Demographics ==
According to the 2021 Canadian census

Languages: 85.7% English, 3.6% Tagalog, 1.7% Spanish, 1.6% French,

Religions: 50.7% Christian (20.0% Catholic, 4.8% United Church, 2.5% Anglican, 2.1% Lutheran, 1.0% Pentecostal, 20.2% Other), 45.0% No religion, 1.9% Muslim

Median income: $43,200 (2020)

Average income: $56,050 (2020)

Panethnic groups in Red Deer (2021)
Panethnic group	2021	
Panethnic group	Pop.	%
European (Note: Statistic includes all persons that did not make up part of a visible minority or an indigenous identity.)	85,360	76.36%
Southeast Asian (Note: Statistic includes total responses of "Filipino" and "Southeast Asian" under visible minority section on census.)	9,115	8.15%
Indigenous	7,295	6.53%
South Asian	2,405	2.15%
African	2,000	1.79%
Latin American	1,815	1.62%
East Asian (Note: Statistic includes total responses of "Chinese", "Korean", and "Japanese" under visible minority section on census.)	1,730	1.55%
Middle Eastern (Note: Statistic includes total responses of "West Asian" and "Arab" under visible minority section on census.)	1,140	1.02%
Other/multiracial (Note: Statistic includes total responses of "Visible minority, n.i.e." and "Multiple visible minorities" under visible minority section on census.)	930	0.83%
Total responses	111,785	97.23%
Total population	114,975	100%
Notes: Totals greater than 100% due to multiple origin responses. Demographics based on 2022 Canadian federal electoral redistribution riding boundaries.

== History ==
This riding was created in 1907 from Calgary and Strathcona ridings. At the time this was a vast riding taking in much of Central Alberta between the two major cities of Calgary and Edmonton. The only major urban centre was Red Deer, then a small town of only 1,500 people.

Once an overwhelmingly rural constituency, it has been consistently reduced in geographic size over the years due to the growth of the City of Red Deer. In 2003, about 20% of the district was transferred to the Wetaskiwin riding.

Like most of Alberta, Red Deer elected a Liberal MP from 1908 to 1921, then a UFA MP from 1921 to 1935, then a Social Credit MP from 1935 to 1958.

Like most other Alberta ridings outside Calgary and Edmonton, the major right-wing party of the day usually won here by blowout margins. A centre-left candidate last cleared 20 percent of the vote in 1968, and from 1979 onward centre-left candidates seldom got 15 percent of the vote.

The riding was split almost in half for the 2015 election. The southern portion, including downtown, became Red Deer—Mountain View, while the northern portion was merged with Wetaskiwin to form Red Deer—Lacombe.

The riding was reinstated by the 2022 Canadian federal electoral redistribution, reuniting the city of Red Deer and combining it with rural areas to its southeast.

=== Historical boundaries ===
1905 representation order

1914 representation order

1924 representation order

1933 representation order

1952 representation order

1966 representation order

1976 representation order

1987 representation order

1996 representation order

2003 representation order

=== Members of Parliament ===
This riding elected the following members of Parliament:

Parliament	Years	Member	Party
Red Deer; Riding created from Calgary and Strathcona
11th	1908–1911	Michael Clark	Liberal
12th	1911–1917	Michael Clark	Liberal
13th	1917–1920	Michael Clark	Government (Unionist)
13th	1920–1921	Michael Clark	Progressive
14th	1921–1925	Alfred Speakman	United Farmers
15th	1925–1926	Alfred Speakman	United Farmers
16th	1926–1930	Alfred Speakman	United Farmers
17th	1930–1935	Alfred Speakman	United Farmers
18th	1935–1940	Eric Joseph Poole	Social Credit
19th	1940–1945	Frederick Davis Shaw	Social Credit
20th	1945–1949	Frederick Davis Shaw	Social Credit
21st	1949–1953	Frederick Davis Shaw	Social Credit
22nd	1953–1957	Frederick Davis Shaw	Social Credit
23rd	1957–1958	Frederick Davis Shaw	Social Credit
24th	1958–1962	Harris George Rogers	Progressive Conservative
25th	1962–1963	Robert N. Thompson	Social Credit
26th	1963–1965	Robert N. Thompson	Social Credit
27th	1965–1968	Robert N. Thompson	Social Credit
28th	1968–1972	Robert N. Thompson	Progressive Conservative
29th	1972–1974	Gordon Towers	Progressive Conservative
30th	1974–1979	Gordon Towers	Progressive Conservative
31st	1979–1980	Gordon Towers	Progressive Conservative
32nd	1980–1984	Gordon Towers	Progressive Conservative
33rd	1984–1988	Gordon Towers	Progressive Conservative
34th	1988–1993	Douglas Fee	Progressive Conservative
35th	1993–1997	Bob Mills	Reform
36th	1997–2000	Bob Mills	Reform
36th	2000–2000	Bob Mills	Alliance
37th	2000–2003	Bob Mills	Alliance
37th	2003–2004	Bob Mills	Conservative
38th	2004–2006	Bob Mills	Conservative
39th	2006–2008	Bob Mills	Conservative
40th	2008–2011	Earl Dreeshen	Conservative
41st	2011–2015	Earl Dreeshen	Conservative
Riding dissolved into Red Deer—Lacombe and Red Deer—Mountain View
Riding re-created from Red Deer—Lacombe and Red Deer—Mountain View
45th	2025–present	Burton Bailey	Conservative

== Election results ==
=== 2023 representation order ===
2025 Canadian federal election
Party	Candidate	Votes	%	±%	Expenditures
Conservative	Burton Bailey	44,239	71.55	+11.04	$77,587.96
Liberal	Ayaz Bangash	13,564	21.94	+13.77	$7,726.80
New Democratic	Elias Assefa	2,375	3.84	–13.51	none listed
People's	Kyla Courte	813	1.32	–9.98	$5,472.62
Green	Ashley MacDonald	618	1.00	–	none listed
Christian Heritage	Brandon Pringle	219	0.35	–	$979.25
Total valid votes/expense limit		61,828	99.50	–	$133,825.57
Total rejected ballots		309	0.50	–	
Turnout		62,137	70.29		
Eligible voters		88,407			
Conservative hold		Swing		–	
Source: Elections Canada

2021 federal election redistributed results
Party	Vote	%
Conservative	32,606	60.51
New Democratic	9,352	17.35
People's	6,084	11.29
Liberal	4,401	8.17
Others	1,445	2.68

=== 2003 representation order ===
2011 Canadian federal election
Party	Candidate	Votes	%	±%	Expenditures
Conservative	Earl Dreeshen	37,959	75.93	+2.69	$59,628.19
New Democratic	Stuart Somerville	7,566	15.13	+4.03	$1.00
Green	Mason Connor Woodruff Sisson	2,551	5.10	–4.24	none listed
Liberal	Andrew Lineker	1,918	3.84	–2.48	$3,679.66
Total valid votes/expense limit		49,994	99.76	–	$96,859.24
Total rejected ballots		119	0.24	–0.02	
Turnout		50,113	53.47	+3.60	
Eligible voters		93,723			
Conservative hold		Swing		+3.36	
Source: Elections Canada

2008 Canadian federal election
Party	Candidate	Votes	%	±%	Expenditures
Conservative	Earl Dreeshen	33,226	73.24	–2.51	$47,630.94
New Democratic	Stuart Somerville	5,040	11.11	+1.17	$1,743.98
Green	Evan Bedford	4,239	9.34	+4.18	none listed
Liberal	Garfield Marks	2,863	6.31	–2.84	$7,449.51
Total valid votes/expense limit		45,368	99.74	–	$92,847.66
Total rejected ballots		118	0.26	+0.04	
Turnout		45,486	49.87	–8.86	
Eligible voters		91,201			
Conservative hold		Swing		–1.84	
Source: Elections Canada

2006 Canadian federal election
Party	Candidate	Votes	%	±%	Expenditures
Conservative	Bob Mills	38,375	75.75	+0.94	$58,250.95
New Democratic	Kelly Bickford	5,034	9.94	+2.12	$3,014.52
Liberal	Luke Kurata	4,636	9.15	–2.67	$12,006.14
Green	Tanner Wade Waldo	2,618	5.17	+0.39	$116.32
Total valid votes/expense limit		50,663	99.78	–	$83,829.96
Total rejected ballots		113	0.22	–0.04	
Turnout		50,776	58.73	+1.00	
Eligible voters		86,457			
Conservative hold		Swing		+1.81	
Source: Elections Canada

2004 Canadian federal election
Party	Candidate	Votes	%	±%	Expenditures
Conservative	Bob Mills	33,510	74.80	–7.77	$52,781.89
Liberal	Luke Kurata	5,294	11.82	–1.00	$25,622.31
New Democratic	Jeff Sloychuk	3,500	7.81	+3.20	$4,239.32
Green	Garfield Marks	2,142	4.78	–	$1,231.26
Canadian Action	Teena Cormack	353	0.79	–	$6.75
Total valid votes/expense limit		44,799	99.74	–	$77,026.06
Total rejected ballots		117	0.26	+0.04	
Turnout		44,916	57.73	–2.67	
Eligible voters		77,804			
Conservative hold		Swing		–	
Source: Elections Canada

=== 1996 representation order ===
2000 Canadian federal election
Party	Candidate	Votes	%	±%	Expenditures
Alliance	Bob Mills	36,940	72.61	+4.24	$59,079
Liberal	Walter Kubanek	6,522	12.82	+1.39	$16,550
Progressive Conservative	Doug Wagstaff	5,064	9.95	–5.73	$5,125
New Democratic	Linda Roth	2,346	4.61	+0.65	$1,773
Total valid votes		50,872	99.78		
Total rejected ballots		113	0.22	+0.06	
Turnout		50,985	60.40	+2.96	
Eligible voters		84,409			
Alliance hold		Swing		–	
Source: Elections Canada

1997 Canadian federal election
Party	Candidate	Votes	%	±%	Expenditures
Reform	Bob Mills	28,622	68.38	+3.56	$66,815
Progressive Conservative	Morris Flewwelling	6,566	15.69	–0.59	$44,412
Liberal	Dobie Yiu-Chung To	4,785	11.43	–2.02	$13,071
New Democratic	Janet Walter	1,660	3.97	+1.30	$3,066
Natural Law	Ken Arnold	227	0.54	–0.06	none listed
Total valid votes		41,860	99.84		
Total rejected ballots		69	0.16	–0.07	
Turnout		41,929	57.44	–7.66	
Eligible voters		73,001			
Reform hold		Swing		+2.08	
Source: Elections Canada

=== 1987 representation order ===
1993 Canadian federal election
Party	Candidate	Votes	%	±%
Reform	Bob Mills	31,876	64.82	+43.77
Progressive Conservative	Douglas Fee	8,006	16.28	–36.98
Liberal	Dobie Yiu-Chung To	6,614	13.45	+3.34
New Democratic	Karen Mc Laren	1,313	2.67	–9.92
National	Joan Hepburn	1,074	2.18	–
Natural Law	Ken Arnold	297	0.60	–
Total valid votes		49,180	99.77	
Total rejected ballots		112	0.23	+0.03
Turnout		49,292	65.10	–7.74
Eligible voters		75,715		
Reform gain from Progressive Conservative		Swing		+40.37
Source: Elections Canada

1988 Canadian federal election
Party	Candidate	Votes	%	±%
Progressive Conservative	Douglas Fee	24,187	53.26	–22.17
Reform	Michael Roth	9,560	21.05	–
New Democratic	Gail Garbutt	5,717	12.59	+3.18
Liberal	Edna C. Allwright	4,593	10.11	+0.72
Christian Heritage	Jim Swan	1,237	2.72	–
Confederation of Regions	Wilfred M. Tricker	121	0.27	–4.25
Total valid votes		45,415	99.80	
Total rejected ballots		91	0.20	+0.00
Turnout		45,506	72.84	+2.09
Eligible voters		62,470		
Progressive Conservative hold		Swing		–
Source: Elections Canada

=== 1976 representation order ===
1984 Canadian federal election
Party	Candidate	Votes	%	±%
Progressive Conservative	Gordon Towers	41,695	75.43	+0.68
New Democratic	Clarence Lacombe	5,201	9.41	+1.54
Liberal	Dennis Moffat	5,195	9.40	–5.15
Confederation of Regions	Roger Langrick	2,494	4.51	–
Social Credit	James Keegstra	691	1.25	–1.58
Total valid votes		55,276	99.80	
Total rejected ballots		111	0.20	–0.04
Turnout		55,387	70.75	+7.07
Eligible voters		78,283		
Progressive Conservative hold		Swing		+1.11
Source: Elections Canada

1980 Canadian federal election
Party	Candidate	Votes	%	±%
Progressive Conservative	Gordon Towers	31,758	74.75	–0.09
Liberal	Dennis Moffat	6,180	14.55	+0.27
New Democratic	Ethel Taylor	3,345	7.87	+1.44
Social Credit	Cecil J. Speirs	1,203	2.83	–1.62
Total valid votes		42,486	99.76	
Total rejected ballots		104	0.24	+0.02
Turnout		42,590	63.68	–5.78
Eligible voters		66,877		
Progressive Conservative hold		Swing		–0.18
Source: Elections Canada

1979 Canadian federal election
Party	Candidate	Votes	%	±%
Progressive Conservative	Gordon Towers	33,226	74.84	+8.14
Liberal	Dennis Moffat	6,338	14.28	–2.65
New Democratic	John Younie	2,856	6.43	–1.93
Social Credit	Cecil J. Speirs	1,974	4.45	–3.56
Total valid votes		44,394	99.78	
Total rejected ballots		96	0.22	–0.02
Turnout		44,490	69.46	–0.02
Eligible voters		64,053		
Progressive Conservative hold		Swing		+5.39
Source: Elections Canada

=== 1966 representation order ===
1974 Canadian federal election
Party	Candidate	Votes	%	±%
Progressive Conservative	Gordon Towers	22,251	66.71	+5.45
Liberal	Dennis Moffat	5,645	16.92	+0.07
New Democratic	Ethel Taylor	2,791	8.37	–2.90
Social Credit	James Keegstra	2,670	8.00	–2.62
Total valid votes		33,357	99.76	
Total rejected ballots		81	0.24	–0.37
Turnout		33,438	69.48	–6.43
Eligible voters		48,123		
Progressive Conservative hold		Swing		+2.76
Source: Library of Parliament

1972 Canadian federal election
Party	Candidate	Votes	%	±%
Progressive Conservative	Gordon Towers	20,943	61.26	–0.96
Liberal	Dennis Moffat	5,762	16.85	–12.78
New Democratic	Bill Finn	3,852	11.27	+3.12
Social Credit	James Keegstra	3,631	10.62	–
Total valid votes		34,188	99.39	
Total rejected ballots		209	0.61	+0.03
Turnout		34,397	75.91	+0.02
Eligible voters		45,311		
Progressive Conservative hold		Swing		+6.87
Source: Library of Parliament

1968 Canadian federal election
Party	Candidate	Votes	%	±%
Progressive Conservative	Robert N. Thompson	17,930	62.21	+22.43
Liberal	Douglas M. Irwin	8,541	29.64	+21.67
New Democratic	Peter G. Anderson	2,349	8.15	+3.05
Total valid votes		28,820	99.42	
Total rejected ballots		168	0.58	+0.18
Turnout		28,988	75.89	–0.52
Eligible voters		38,198		
Progressive Conservative gain from Social Credit		Swing		+22.05
Source: Library of Parliament

=== 1952 representation order ===
1965 Canadian federal election
Party	Candidate	Votes	%	±%
Social Credit	Robert N. Thompson	12,383	47.15	+2.22
Progressive Conservative	Gordon Towers	10,448	39.78	–1.34
Liberal	Max De Hamel	2,093	7.97	–2.00
New Democratic	Hazel Eva Braithwaite	1,340	5.10	+1.11
Total valid votes		26,264	99.60	
Total rejected ballots		106	0.40	+0.11
Turnout		26,370	76.41	–4.69
Eligible voters		34,511		
Social Credit hold		Swing		+1.78
Source: Library of Parliament

1963 Canadian federal election
Party	Candidate	Votes	%	±%
Social Credit	Robert N. Thompson	12,182	44.93	–6.11
Progressive Conservative	Gordon Towers	11,149	41.12	+3.41
Liberal	Max De Hamel	2,702	9.97	+3.48
New Democratic	Paul A. Jenson	1,082	3.99	–0.78
Total valid votes		27,115	99.71	
Total rejected ballots		79	0.29	–0.24
Turnout		27,194	81.10	+3.97
Eligible voters		33,530		
Social Credit hold		Swing		–4.76
Source: Library of Parliament

1962 Canadian federal election
Party	Candidate	Votes	%	±%
Social Credit	Robert N. Thompson	12,645	51.04	+17.64
Progressive Conservative	Harris George Rogers	9,343	37.71	–16.81
Liberal	Knut E. Magnusson	1,608	6.49	–0.75
New Democratic	Paul A. Jenson	1,181	4.77	–0.08
Total valid votes		24,777	99.47	
Total rejected ballots		132	0.53	+0.11
Turnout		24,909	77.13	+2.65
Eligible voters		32,295		
Social Credit gain from Progressive Conservative		Swing		+17.22
Source: Library of Parliament

1958 Canadian federal election
Party	Candidate	Votes	%	±%
Progressive Conservative	Harris George Rogers	11,569	54.51	+24.90
Social Credit	Frederick Davis Shaw	7,087	33.40	–14.25
Liberal	Sadie A. Shrader	1,537	7.24	–10.13
Co-operative Commonwealth	Robert H. Carlyle	1,029	4.85	–0.52
Total valid votes		21,222	99.58	
Total rejected ballots		89	0.42	–0.29
Turnout		21,311	74.48	+2.24
Eligible voters		28,614		
Progressive Conservative gain from Social Credit		Swing		+19.57
Source: Library of Parliament

1957 Canadian federal election
Party	Candidate	Votes	%	±%
Social Credit	Frederick Davis Shaw	9,519	47.64	–4.74
Progressive Conservative	Harris George Rogers	5,918	29.62	+20.84
Liberal	Wilfred James Edgar	3,471	17.37	–12.87
Co-operative Commonwealth	Alexander Sandy Manson	1,073	5.37	–1.40
Total valid votes		19,981	99.29	
Total rejected ballots		143	0.71	+0.12
Turnout		20,124	72.24	+8.98
Eligible voters		27,857		
Social Credit hold		Swing		–8.81
Source: Library of Parliament

1953 Canadian federal election
Party	Candidate	Votes	%	±%
Social Credit	Frederick Davis Shaw	8,792	52.38	–2.13
Liberal	Archie Boyce	5,076	30.24	+11.62
Progressive Conservative	John A.R. Choate	1,474	8.78	–9.24
Co-operative Commonwealth	Hubert M. Smith	1,136	6.77	–2.07
Labor–Progressive	Rose Sarman	306	1.82	–
Total valid votes		16,784	99.41	
Total rejected ballots		99	0.59	–0.08
Turnout		16,883	63.26	–5.34
Eligible voters		26,688		
Social Credit hold		Swing		–6.88
Source: Library of Parliament

=== 1933 representation order ===
1949 Canadian federal election
Party	Candidate	Votes	%	±%
Social Credit	Frederick Davis Shaw	10,549	54.51	+8.03
Liberal	Albert Bliss McGorman	3,604	18.62	+4.30
Progressive Conservative	Harry Lloyd Taggart	3,488	18.03	–1.51
Co-operative Commonwealth	Cyril M. Ironside	1,710	8.84	–7.19
Total valid votes		19,351	99.33	
Total rejected ballots		131	0.67	–0.39
Turnout		19,482	68.60	–5.08
Eligible voters		28,399		
Social Credit hold		Swing		+4.77
Source: Library of Parliament

1945 Canadian federal election
Party	Candidate	Votes	%	±%
Social Credit	Frederick Davis Shaw	8,653	46.48	+9.71
Progressive Conservative	Harry Lloyd Taggart	3,636	19.53	+1.79
Co-operative Commonwealth	Alban MacLellan	2,984	16.03	–2.22
Liberal	Claude J. Davidson	2,666	14.32	–12.91
Labor–Progressive	William Lund	677	3.64	–
Total valid votes		18,616	98.94	
Total rejected ballots		200	1.06	+0.25
Turnout		18,816	73.68	+15.16
Eligible voters		25,537		
Social Credit hold		Swing		+5.75
Source: Library of Parliament

1940 Canadian federal election
Party	Candidate	Votes	%	±%
Social Credit	Frederick Davis Shaw	5,583	36.77	–22.79
Liberal	Absalom Clark Bury	4,134	27.23	+13.20
Co-operative Commonwealth	Peter Newton Russell Morrison	2,771	18.25	+4.27
National Government	Arthur A. Stonhouse	2,694	17.75	+5.32
Total valid votes		15,182	99.19	
Total rejected ballots		124	0.81	–0.04
Turnout		15,306	58.52	–2.32
Eligible voters		26,155		
Social Credit hold		Swing		–18.00
Source: Library of Parliament

1935 Canadian federal election
Party	Candidate	Votes	%	±%
Social Credit	Eric Joseph Poole	7,901	59.56	–
Liberal	George Clark	1,861	14.03	–28.19
Co-operative Commonwealth	Alfred Speakman	1,855	13.98	–43.75
Conservative	Arthur Hiram Stewart	1,648	12.42	–
Total valid votes		13,265	99.15	
Total rejected ballots		114	0.85	+0.17
Turnout		13,379	60.84	+0.89
Eligible voters		21,989		
Social Credit gain from United Farmers of Alberta		Swing		–
Source: Library of Parliament

=== 1924 representation order ===
1930 Canadian federal election
Party	Candidate	Votes	%	±%
United Farmers of Alberta	Alfred Speakman	6,256	57.78	–14.48
Liberal	William John Botterill	4,571	42.22	–
Total valid votes		10,827	99.32	
Total rejected ballots		74	0.68	+0.37
Turnout		10,901	59.95	+13.80
Eligible voters		18,182		
United Farmers of Alberta hold		Swing		–
Source: Library of Parliament

1926 Canadian federal election
Party	Candidate	Votes	%	±%
United Farmers of Alberta	Alfred Speakman	5,603	72.26	+26.10
Conservative	Joseph George La France	2,151	27.74	+3.42
Total valid votes		7,754	99.69	
Total rejected ballots		24	0.31	+0.08
Turnout		7,778	46.15	–4.35
Eligible voters		16,854		
United Farmers of Alberta hold		Swing		+14.76
Source: Library of Parliament

1925 Canadian federal election
Party	Candidate	Votes	%	±%
United Farmers of Alberta	Alfred Speakman	3,851	46.16	–22.94
Liberal	Thomas McKercher	2,462	29.51	+15.46
Conservative	Joseph George La France	2,029	24.32	+7.48
Total valid votes		8,342	99.77	
Total rejected ballots		19	0.23	+0.23
Turnout		8,361	50.50	–17.20
Eligible voters		16,558		
United Farmers of Alberta hold		Swing		–
Source: Library of Parliament

=== 1914 representation order ===
1921 Canadian federal election
Party	Candidate	Votes	%	±%
United Farmers of Alberta	Alfred Speakman	10,849	69.10	–
Conservative	John Frederick Day	2,644	16.84	–41.15
Liberal	William Wallace Burns McInnes	2,207	14.06	–21.41
Total valid votes		15,700	100.00	
Total rejected ballots		–		
Turnout		15,700	67.70	–23.16
Eligible voters		23,190		
United Farmers of Alberta gain from Government (Unionist)		Swing		–
Source: Library of Parliament

1917 Canadian federal election
Party	Candidate	Votes	%	±%
Government (Unionist)	Michael Clark	6,213	57.99	–5.36
Opposition	William Puffer	3,800	35.47	–
Labour	Joseph Robert Knight	701	6.54	–
Total valid votes		10,714	100.00	
Total rejected ballots		–		
Turnout		10,714	90.86	+29.49
Eligible voters		11,792		
Government (Unionist) gain from Liberal		Swing		–
Source: Library of Parliament

=== 1905 representation order ===
1911 Canadian federal election
Party	Candidate	Votes	%	±%
Liberal	Michael Clark	6,711	63.35	+11.41
Conservative	Alexander McGillivray	3,882	36.65	–11.41
Total valid votes		10,593	100.00	
Total rejected ballots		–		
Turnout		10,593	61.37	–
Eligible voters		17,261		
Liberal hold		Swing		+11.41
Source: Library of Parliament

1908 Canadian federal election
Party	Candidate	Votes	%	±%
Liberal	Michael Clark	3,481	51.94	–
Conservative	George F. Root	3,221	48.06	–
Total valid votes		6,702	100.00	
Total rejected ballots		–		
Turnout		6,702	–	
Eligible voters				
Liberal notional gain		Swing		–
Source: Library of Parliament

== See also ==
- List of Canadian electoral districts
- Historical federal electoral districts of Canada
