= Earl Dreeshen =

Canadian politician (born 1953)

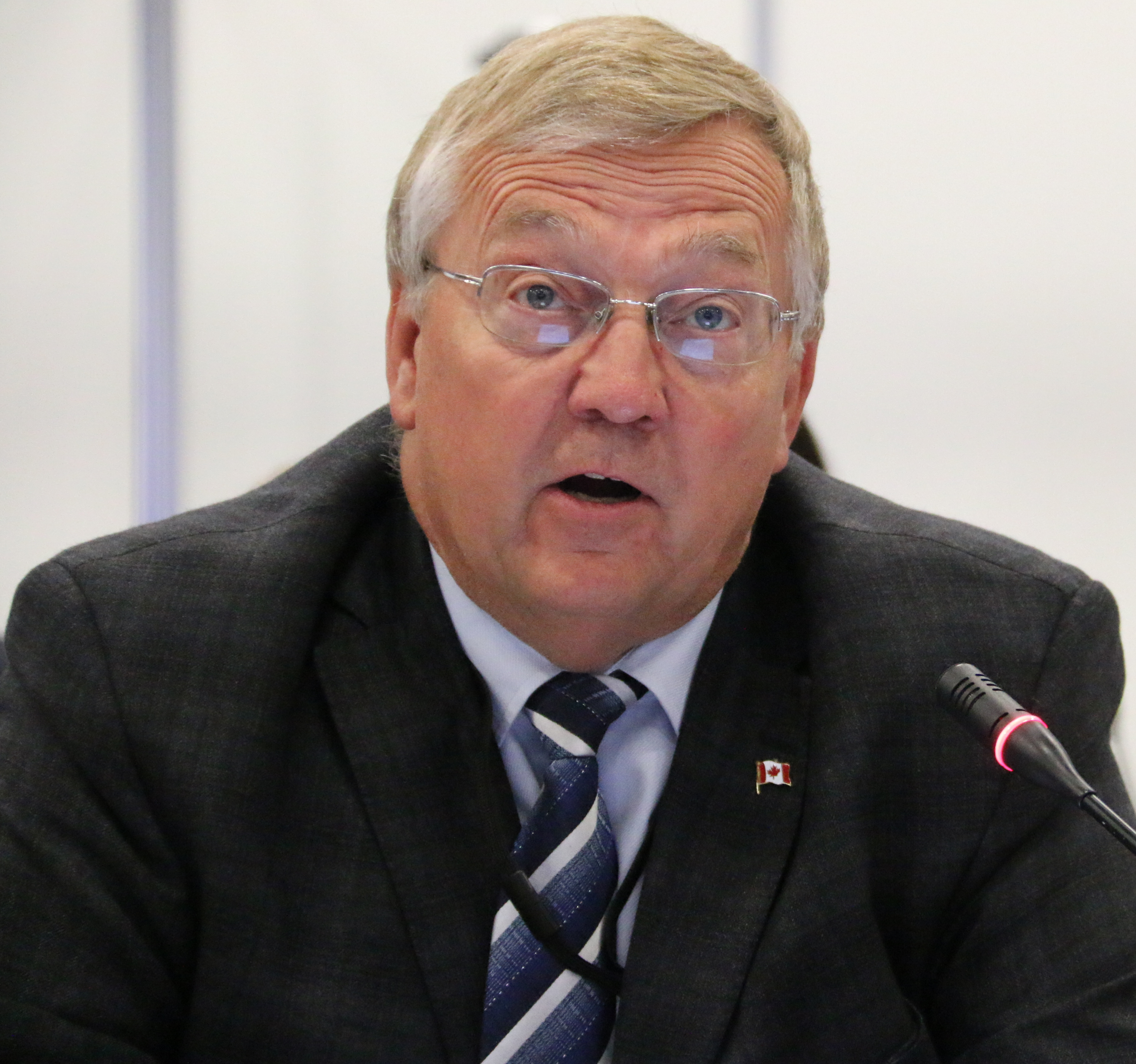
- Earl Dreeshen in 2016

Member of Parliament for Red Deer—Mountain View Red Deer (2008-2015)
- In office October 14, 2008 – March 23, 2025
- Preceded by: Bob Mills
- Succeeded by: Riding dissolved

Personal details
- Born: July 9, 1953 (age 72) Red Deer, Alberta, Canada
- Party: Conservative
- Relations: Devin Dreeshen (son)
- Profession: Farmer

Earl Dreeshen (born July 9, 1953) is a Canadian politician, who served as a Member of Parliament with the Conservative Party from 2008 to 2025.

== Political career ==
Dreeshen was initially elected to represent the electoral district of Red Deer in the 2008 Canadian federal election, and re-elected with an increased majority in 2011. Red Deer was split almost in half ahead of the 2015 election, and Dreeshen opted to run in Red Deer—Mountain View—essentially the southern half of his old riding.

On January 21, 2025, he announced he would stand down at the 2025 Canadian federal election.

=== Abortion ===
Dreeshen opposes abortion. Dreeshen supported a motion to examine whether a fetus is a human being, which was defeated in the House of Commons in a vote of 203 to 91.

Dreeshen voted in support of Bill C-233 - An Act to amend the Criminal Code (sex-selective abortion), which making it a criminal offence for a medical practitioner to knowingly perform an abortion solely on the grounds of the child's genetic sex.

=== Conversion therapy ===
On June 22, 2021, Dreeshen was one of 63 MPs to vote against Bill C-6, An Act to amend the Criminal Code (conversion therapy), which was passed by majority vote, making certain aspects of conversion therapy a crime, including "causing a child to undergo conversion therapy."

== Personal life ==
Prior to becoming an MP he was a farmer and a physics and math teacher. He and his wife still manage their family farm. His son Devin Dreeshen is the MLA for Innisfail-Sylvan Lake, the current Alberta Minister of Transportation and Economic Corridors (as of September 7, 2024), and a former Alberta Minister of Agriculture and Forestry.

== Electoral record ==
2019 Canadian federal election: Red Deer—Mountain View
Party	Candidate	Votes	%	±%	Expenditures
Conservative	Earl Dreeshen	54,765	80.34	+6.00	$61,955.02
New Democratic	Logan Garbanewski	4,946	7.26	–1.16	$4,683.86
Liberal	Gary Tremblay	3,795	5.57	–7.86	$2,038.71
People's	Paul Mitchell	2,637	3.87	–	$15,053.69
Green	Conner Borlé	2,026	2.97	+0.37	$87.00
Total valid votes/expense limit		68,169	99.59	–	$114,110.55
Total rejected ballots		278	0.41	+0.19	
Turnout		68,447	75.33	+4.74	
Eligible voters		90,857			
Conservative hold		Swing		+6.93	
Source: Elections Canada

2015 Canadian federal election: Red Deer-Mountain View
Party	Candidate	Votes	%	±%	Expenditures
Conservative	Earl Dreeshen	46,245	74.3	-5.07	–
Liberal	Chandra Lescia Kastern	8,356	13.4	+9.86	–
New Democratic	Paul Harris	5,233	8.4	-3.51	–
Green	Simon Oleny	1,621	2.6	-2.44	–
Libertarian	James Walper	445	0.7	–	–
Pirate	Scott Milne	312	0.5	–	–
Total valid votes/Expense limit		62,212	100.0		$223,075.30
Total rejected ballots		135	–	–	
Turnout		62,347	71.8	–	
Eligible voters		86,737			
Conservative hold		Swing		-7.47	
Source: Elections Canada

2011 Canadian federal election: Red Deer
Party	Candidate	Votes	%	±%	Expenditures
Conservative	Earl Dreeshen	37,959	75.93	+2.70	$63,247
New Democratic	Stuart Somerville	7,566	15.13	+4.03	$1
Green	Mason Sisson	2,551	5.10	-4.24	
Liberal	Andrew Lineker	1,918	3.84	-2.47	$3,784
Total valid votes/Expense limit		49,994	100.00		
Total rejected ballots		119	0.24	-0.02	
Turnout		50,113	54.01	+4.14	
Eligible voters		92,792	–	–	

2008 Canadian federal election: Red Deer
Party	Candidate	Votes	%	±%	Expenditures
Conservative	Earl Dreeshen	33,226	73.23	-2.51	$53,804
New Democratic	Stuart Somerville	5,040	11.10	+1.17	$1,774
Green	Evan Bedford	4,239	9.34	+4.18	
Liberal	Garfield Marks	2,863	6.31	-2.84	$7,450
Total valid votes/Expense limit		45,368	100.00	$92,848	
Total rejected ballots		118	0.26	+0.04	
Turnout		45,486	49.87	-14.86	
