= Burton Bailey =

Canadian politician

Burton Bailey MP

Member of Parliament for Red Deer
- Incumbent
- Assumed office April 28, 2025
- Preceded by: riding recreated

Personal details
- Party: Conservative

Burton Bailey MP is a Canadian politician from the Conservative Party of Canada. He was elected Member of Parliament for Red Deer in the 2025 Canadian federal election. He is a local businessman and a former executive assistant to MLA Adriana LaGrange.

At the time of the 2025 Canadian federal election, he lived in Red Deer County.

== Electoral record ==
2025 Canadian federal election: Red Deer
Party	Candidate	Votes	%	±%	Expenditures
Conservative	Burton Bailey	44,239	71.55	+11.04	$77,587.96
Liberal	Ayaz Bangash	13,564	21.94	+13.77	$7,726.80
New Democratic	Elias Assefa	2,375	3.84	–13.51	none listed
People's	Kyla Courte	813	1.32	–9.98	$5,472.62
Green	Ashley MacDonald	618	1.00	–	none listed
Christian Heritage	Brandon Pringle	219	0.35	–	$979.25
Total valid votes/expense limit		61,828	99.50	–	$133,825.57
Total rejected ballots		309	0.50	–	
Turnout		62,137	70.29		
Eligible voters		88,407			
Conservative hold		Swing		–	
Source: Elections Canada
