= Gordon Towers =

Canadian politician

The Honourable Gordon Towers AOE

13th Lieutenant Governor of Alberta
- In office March 11, 1991 – April 17, 1996
- Monarch: Elizabeth II
- Governors General: Ray Hnatyshyn; Roméo LeBlanc
- Premier: Don Getty; Ralph Klein
- Preceded by: Helen Hunley
- Succeeded by: Bud Olson

Member of the Canadian Parliament for Red Deer
- In office October 30, 1972 – November 21, 1988
- Preceded by: Robert N. Thompson
- Succeeded by: Doug Fee

Personal details
- Born: Thomas Gordon Towers; July 5, 1919 Willowdale, Alberta
- Died: June 8, 1999 (aged 79) Red Deer, Alberta, Canada
- Party: Progressive Conservative Party of Canada
- Spouse: Doris R. Nicholson (m. 1940)
- Children: 5
- Occupation: Farmer

Thomas Gordon Towers AOE (July 5, 1919 – June 8, 1999) was a Canadian politician, member of Parliament (MP), and the 13th lieutenant governor of Alberta.

== Early life ==
Thomas Gordon Towers was born on July 5, 1919, the youngest of four children to Thomas Henry Towers and Janet Morrison, on the family's homestead in the Willowdale District (present-day Red Deer County) southeast of Red Deer, Alberta.

Gordon Towers was educated at the Willowdale School, and although he aspired to go to university, he was unable to leave the family farm due to the Great Depression.

Gordon Towers married Doris Roberta Nicholson (b. 1921) on December 27, 1940, and they had five children together and fostered one daughter.

In March 1941 Towers joined the Royal Canadian Artillery but was given an honourable discharge after three months in May 1941 due to a hip injury.

== Federal political career ==
A farmer by profession, Gordon Towers was an unsuccessful Progressive Conservative candidate in Red Deer in the 1963 and 1965 federal elections, losing to the Social Credit Leader Robert N. Thompson both times.

Towers made a third run for the seat in the 1972 election after Thompson, by then a Tory, unsuccessfully sought a seat from British Columbia. This time he won, and was re-elected four subsequent times in 1974, 1979, 1980 and 1984. He did not run in the 1988 election following a heart attack in 1987. From 1984 to 1986, he was the parliamentary secretary to the solicitor general of Canada. From 1986 to 1987, he was the parliamentary secretary to the minister of state for science and technology. Towers was a delegate to the United Nations General Assembly in 1978 and a delegate of the Canadian Branch, Commonwealth Parliamentary Association, to the 29th Parliamentary Seminar, which was held at Westminster.

Gordon Towers introduced several pieces of legislation to Parliament regarding representation, including the 1982 Private Members Bill C-223 which proposed Parliament continue to limit its membership to 282 until Canada reached a population of 50 million. All of Towers' private member bills died on the Order Paper.

== Lieutenant governor of Alberta ==
On the advice of Prime Minister Brian Mulroney, Towers was appointed lieutenant governor of Alberta by Governor General Ray Hnatyshyn on March 11, 1991. Towers served in this post from March 11, 1991, to April 17, 1996, when his successor Bud Olson was sworn in as the 14th lieutenant governor.

In 1993, Towers broke with tradition and refused the advice of Economic Development Minister Ken Kowalski and did not approve an order in council for a $1.5 million grant program. The program would have granted a substantial government loan for the restructuring of a motor hotel, and Towers exercised his right to withhold approval based on insufficient documentation. Towers insisted the lieutenant governor "is not just a rubber stamp". Towers eventually approved the order in council on March 1, once a full explanation had been provided.

In another unusual move, Towers opened the Fourth Sitting of the 22nd Alberta Legislature with a "90-minute state-of-affairs address" rather than the traditional speech from the throne. Towers' reasoning for the change was that the session would last only a couple of weeks until the 1993 Alberta general election was called.

== Later life ==
Towers created controversy when he called for the resignation of his successor as lieutenant governor, Bud Olsen, after he held the 1997 New Year's levee in Medicine Hat, becoming the first time the province's levee had been held outside the capital city of Edmonton. Towers went so far as to appeal to Prime Minister Jean Chrétien for Olsen's removal from office after Olsen remarked he "doesn't give a damn" what Towers thought of him breaking the tradition.

Gordon Towers died in Red Deer from complications of diabetes on June 8, 1999. He is buried in the Red Deer Cemetery.

== Honours and awards ==
In 1989, Towers was named the Paul Harris Fellow by Rotary International, and the 1990 Citizen of the Year by the Red Deer Chamber of Commerce. Towers was made a Knight of Grace of the Most Venerable Order of the Hospital of St. John of Jerusalem in 1991, and honorary lieutenant-colonel of the 749 Communication Squadron, Red Deer, in 1992.

In 1992 Towers received an honorary doctor of laws from the University of Alberta.

== Arms ==
Coat of arms of Gordon Towers

Adopted
September 1, 2005
Crest
A demi lion Or crowned with a coronet of wild roses Gules alternating with maple leaves on a rim Or the dexter paw holding a quill Azure the sinister paw supporting a book proper bound Azure the sinister page charged with a Latin cross Or
Escutcheon
Azure a cowboy mounted on a horse statant between three ducal coronets Or
Supporters
Dexter a horse Or unguled Gules gorged with a collar of rope Azure pendant therefrom a stag's head erased Gules Sinister a bull Or unguled and accorné Gules marked on the rump with the brand of Dromore Ranch Sable and gorged with a wreath of northwest poplar leaves Vert pendant therefrom a torteau charged with six mullets Or
Compartment
Prairie grass proper
Motto
Latin: Omnibus quibus occurri intersum, lit. 'I live among everything I ever ran into'
