= Kerry Towle =

Canadian politician (born c.1974)

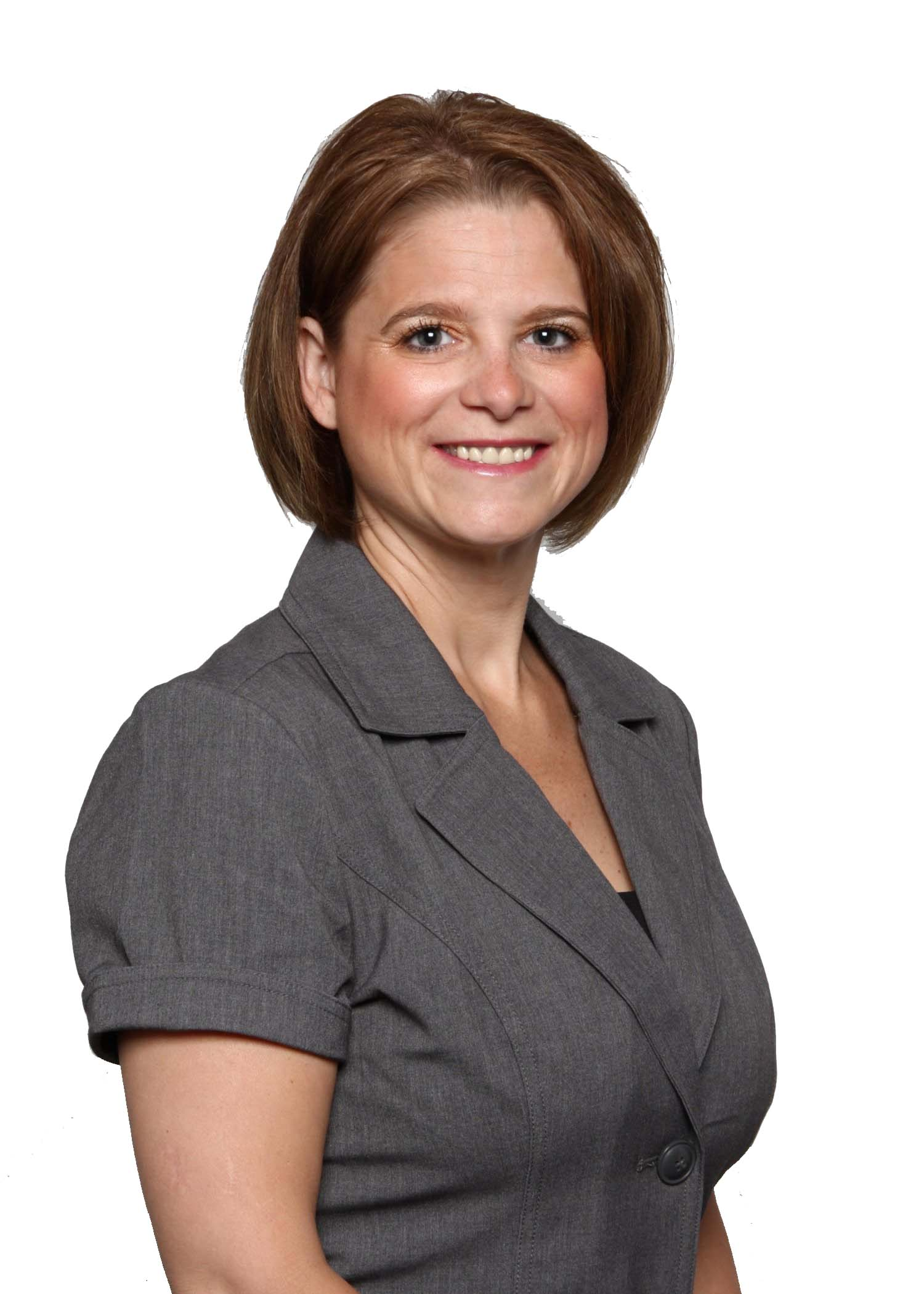

MLA for Innisfail-Sylvan Lake
- In office April 23, 2012 – May 5, 2015
- Preceded by: Luke Ouellette
- Succeeded by: Don MacIntyre

Personal details
- Born: 1973 or 1974 (age 52–53)
- Party: Alberta Party (2017–present)
- Other political affiliations: Wildrose (2012–2014); Progressive Conservative (2014–2017)
- Spouse: Brad
- Children: 1
- Occupation: Real Estate Agent
- Website: kerrytowle.com

Kerry Towle (born c. 1974) is a Canadian politician and former Member of the Legislative Assembly of Alberta representing the electoral district of Innisfail-Sylvan Lake and served as the Seniors Critic as a member of the Wildrose Alliance, before leaving the Wildrose Party on November 24, 2014, to join the Alberta Progressive Conservative Party. Towle lost her re-election bid, to Don MacIntyre of the Wildrose, on May 5, 2015.

Before becoming a politician, Towle worked for both Indian and Northern Affairs, the David Thompson Health Region and was a turkey farmer with her husband Brad for five years. Towle also worked six years in real estate.

== Political career ==
Towle's political career began in June 2011 when she won the candidacy for the Wildrose in Innisfail-Sylvan Lake, after citing the need to improve health care, to give a voice to grassroots Albertans and to protect property rights for landowners.

On April 23, 2012, Towle became MLA for Innisfail-Sylvan Lake, winning 46 per cent of the vote and defeating the incumbent PC MLA, Luke Ouellette. Shortly after her election win, Towle was appointed Seniors Critic by Wildrose Leader Danielle Smith.

Upon becoming the Wildrose Seniors Critic, Towle was credited as being an effective advocate for Albertans by producing results for seniors on issues of quality of care at seniors facilities. In early 2013, Towle went on a Seniors Tour across Alberta as part of the policy development process for the Wildrose heading into the 2016 election and to listen to concerns from seniors on quality of food in continuing care facilities, the one bath per week policy implemented by Alberta Health Services and the need for an independent seniors advocate.

On November 24, 2014, Towle left the Wildrose Party, crossing the floor of the Legislature to join the governing Progressive Conservative Party's caucus.

Later joined the Alberta Party.

== Electoral history ==
2012 Alberta general election: Innisfail-Sylvan Lake
Party	Candidate	Votes	%	±%
Wildrose	Kerry Towle	7,084	46.22	+35.26
Progressive Conservative	Luke Ouellette	6,140	40.06	-22.76
Alberta Party	Danielle Klooster	747	4.87	
New Democratic	Patricia Norman	715	4.66	-1.67
Liberal	Les Vidok	642	4.19	-9.69
Total		15,328	99.22	
Rejected, spoiled, and declined		120	0.78	
Turnout		15,488	54.84	
Eligible voters		28,167		
Wildrose gain from Progressive Conservative		Swing		+29.01
Source(s) Elections Alberta. "Electoral Division Results, 64 - INNISFAIL-SYLVAN LAKE".

2015 Alberta general election: Innisfail-Sylvan Lake
Party	Candidate	Votes	%	±%
Wildrose	Don MacIntyre	7,829	42.68	-3.54
Progressive Conservative	Kerry Towle	5,136	28.00	-12.06
New Democratic	Patricia Norman	4,244	23.14	+18.47
Alberta Party	Danielle Klooster	1,135	6.19	+1.31
Total		18,344	99.48	
Rejected, spoiled, and declined		95	0.52	-0.26
Turnout		18,439	55.49	+0.65
Eligible voters		33,227		
Wildrose hold		Swing		+4.26
Source(s) Elections Alberta. "Electoral Division Results, 64 - INNISFAIL-SYLVAN LAKE".
