= Don MacIntyre =

Canadian politician

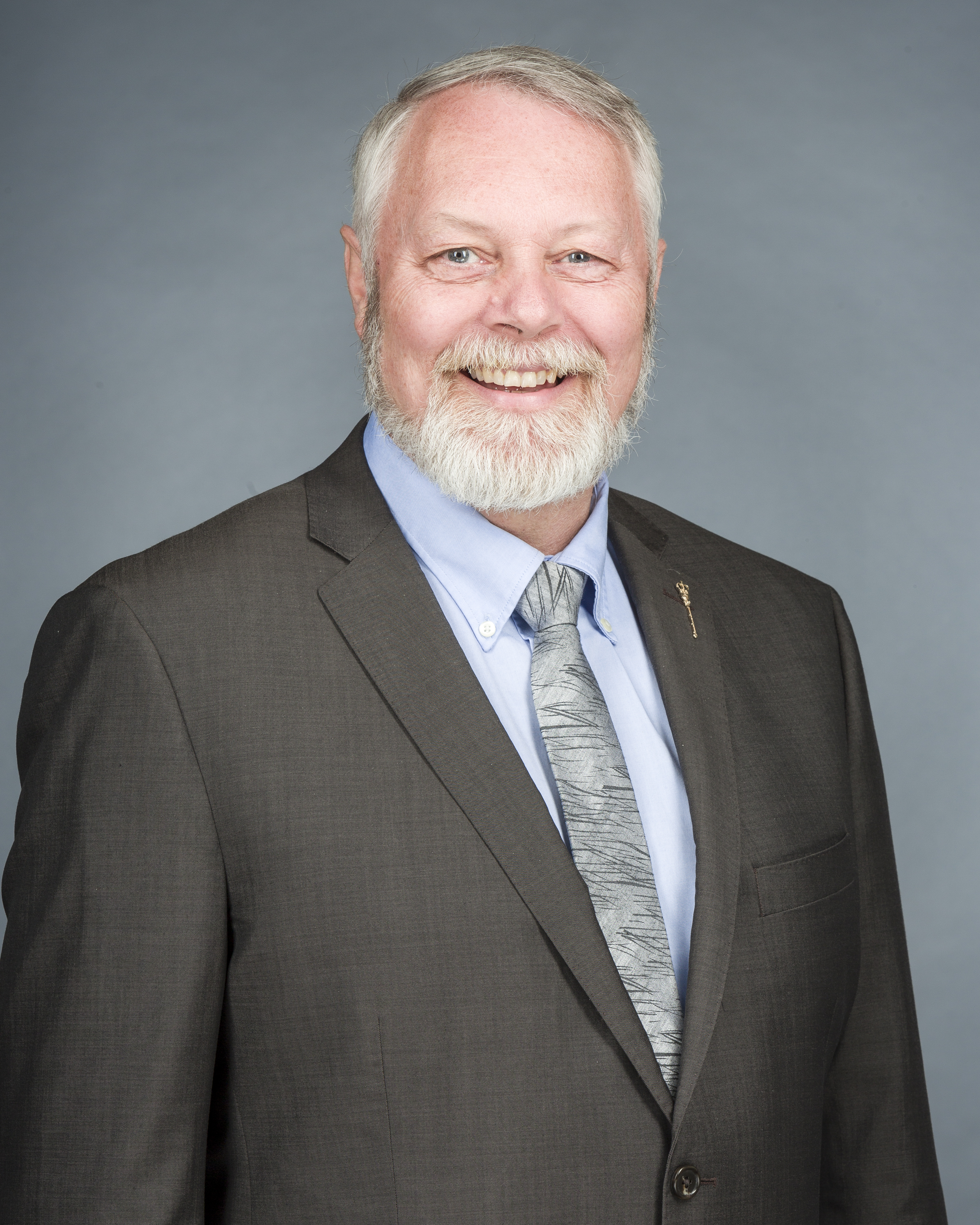
- Don MacIntyre 2015

Member of the Legislative Assembly of Alberta for Innisfail-Sylvan Lake
- In office May 5, 2015 – February 5, 2018
- Preceded by: Kerry Towle
- Succeeded by: Devin Dreeshen

Personal details
- Born: 1955 (age 70–71) North Battleford, Saskatchewan
- Party: Independent
- Other political affiliations: Wildrose (2015–17); United Conservative Party (2017–18)
- Occupation: Educator

Donald Brian MacIntyre (born 1955) is a former Canadian politician and criminal from Alberta. He was elected in the 2015 Alberta general election to the Legislative Assembly of Alberta, where he represented the electoral district of Innisfail-Sylvan Lake. MacIntyre resigned on February 5, 2018 after being charged with sexual assault and "sexual interference" (i.e., touching a minor for a sexual purpose). On January 11, 2019, MacIntyre pleaded guilty to sexual interference and was sentenced to three years in prison, while the charge of sexual assault was withdrawn.

== Views on climate change ==
On January 2, 2017, MacIntyre — while speaking to the press — asserted that human activity is not the primary cause of climate change. This conflicts with the current scientific opinion on climate change, which asserts a 95% confidence that climate change is caused primarily by human activities.

The Alberta New Democratic Party — which held a majority government in the legislature — responded by requesting that the Wildrose Party – the official opposition – remove Don MacIntyre from his position as energy critic. Leduc-Beaumont NDP MLA Shaye Anderson said, "It’s irresponsible to lend climate change-denying conspiracies the credibility of the office of the Official Opposition. Unless (Wildrose Leader Brian) Jean agrees with what Mr. MacIntyre is saying, he must remove him from his position."

The Wildrose Party responded by issuing a statement that, "We get calls daily from Albertans living in NDP-held ridings furious that their MLAs are not listening to their opposition to the carbon tax. I suggest they spend their time listening to those concerns," – in reference to the $20 per tonne carbon tax put in place by the Alberta government.

== Criminal history ==
MacIntyre resigned his seat as legislative representative for Innisfail-Sylvan Lake in February 2018, near the time he was charged with sexual assault and sexual interference involving a girl under the age of 16. The actions occurred between five and ten times between 2010 and 2011 and, during the trial, MacIntyre claimed that his actions were done during a dark period of his life and part of Satan's plan. He also told his victim during the actions that God had approved the abuse.

On January 11, 2019, MacIntyre pled guilty to sexual interference and was sentenced to three years in prison, while the charge of sexual assault was withdrawn.

== Electoral history ==
=== 2015 general election ===
2015 Alberta general election: Innisfail-Sylvan Lake
Party	Candidate	Votes	%
Wildrose	Don MacIntyre	7,827	42.7%
Progressive Conservative	Kerry Towle	5,138	28.0%
New Democratic	Patricia Norman	4,250	23.2%
Alberta Party	Danielle Klooster	1,134	6.2%
