= Innisfail-Sylvan Lake =

Provincial electoral district in Alberta, Canada

Alberta electoral district
- Innisfail-Sylvan Lake within Alberta, 2017 boundaries

Provincial electoral district
- Legislature: Legislative Assembly of Alberta
MLA
Devin Dreeshen
United Conservative
- District created: 1993
- First contested: 1993
- Last contested: 2023

Demographics
- Census division: Division No. 8
- Census subdivision(s): Birchcliff, Bowden, Delburne, Elnora, Half Moon Bay, Innisfail, Jarvis Bay, Lacombe County, Norglenwold, Penhold, Red Deer County, Sylvan Lake

Innisfail-Sylvan Lake is a provincial electoral district in Alberta, Canada. It is one of 87 current districts mandated to return a single member to the Legislative Assembly of Alberta using the first past the post method of voting.

The district was created in the 1993 boundary redistribution from the old Innisfail electoral district that had existed since the province was created in 1905. It is located in rural central Alberta just south of the city of Red Deer. Communities include Innisfail, Sylvan Lake, Penhold, Bowden, Delburne, Elnora, Springbrook, Spruce View, Markerville, and Dickson.

In recent decades the district has elected Progressive Conservative candidates with strong majorities, but in the 2012 election the district elected Wildrose Candidate Kerry Towle. After crossing the floor to the Progressive Conservatives Towle was defeated in the 2015 election by Wildrose candidate Don MacIntyre.

== History ==
The electoral district was created in the 1993 boundary redistribution primarily from the old electoral district of Innisfail. The 2010 boundary redistribution saw a portion of the district west of Sylvan Lake transferred to Rimbey-Rocky Mountain House-Sundre and portions of land that were outside of the city of Red Deer in the Red Deer-North transferred in.

=== Boundary history ===
59 Innisfail-Sylvan Lake 2003 Boundaries
Bordering Districts
North	East	West	South
Lacombe-Ponoka, Red Deer-North and Red Deer-South	Drumheller-Stettler	Banff-Cochrane and Rocky Mountain House	Olds-Didsbury-Three Hills
riding map goes here			
Legal description from the Statutes of Alberta 2003, Electoral Divisions Act.
Starting at the intersection of the east boundary of Rge. 4 W5 and the north boundary of Sec. 18 in Twp. 38 Rge. 3 W5; then 1. east along the north boundary of Secs. 18, 17, 16 and 15 to the east boundary of Sec. 22 in the Twp.; 2. north along the east boundary to the north boundary of the south half of Sec. 23 in the Twp.; 3. east along the north boundary to the east boundary of the west half of Sec. 23 in the Twp.; 4. north along the east boundary to the north boundary of Sec. 23 in the Twp.; 5. east along the north boundary of Sec. 23 to the east boundary of Sec. 26; 6. north along the east boundary of Sec. 26 to the right bank of the Medicine River; 7. upstream along the right bank of the Medicine River to the north boundary of Twp. 38; 8. east along the north boundary to the east boundary of the west half of Sec. 6 in Twp. 39, Rge. 2 W5; 9. north along the east boundary to the north boundary of the south half of Sec. 6 in the Twp.; 10. east along the north boundary of the south half of Secs. 6, 5, 4, 3 and 2 to the east boundary of Sec. 2 in the Twp.; 11. north along the east boundary of Secs. 2, 11 and 14 to the north boundary of the south half of Sec. 13 in the Twp.; 12. east along the north boundary to the east boundary of Rge. 2 W5; 13. south along the east boundary to the north boundary of Sec. 7 in Twp. 39, Rge. 1 W5; 14. east along the north boundary of Secs. 7, 8, 9, 10, 11 and 12 in the Twp. and the north boundary of Secs. 8, 9 and 10 in Twp. 39, Rge. 28 W4 to the east boundary of Sec. 15; 15. north along the east boundary of Sec. 15 to the right bank of the Blindman River; 16. downstream along the right bank of the Blindman River to the east boundary of Rge. 28 W4; 17. south along the east boundary of Rge. 28 to the north boundary of Twp. 38 (Highway 11A); 18. east along the north boundary of Twp. 38 (Highway 11A) to the west Red Deer city boundary; 19. south, southeast, east and north along the Red Deer city boundary to the intersection with Highway 11; 20. east along Highway 11 to the intersection with the right bank of the Red Deer River; 21. downstream along the right bank of the Red Deer River to the north boundary of Twp. 34 in Rge. 21 W4; 22. west along the north boundary to the east boundary of Rge. 24 W4; 23. north along the east boundary to the north boundary of Sec. 1 in Twp. 35, Rge. 24 W4; 24. west along the north boundary of Secs. 1, 2, 3, 4, 5 and 6 in the Twp. and the north boundary of Secs. 1 and 2 in Twp. 35, Rge. 25 W4 to the east boundary of Sec. 3 in the Twp.; 25. south along the east boundary to the north boundary of Twp. 34; 26. east along the north boundary of Twp. 34 to the east boundary of Sec. 33 in Twp. 34, Rge. 25 W4; 27. south along the east boundary to the north boundary of Sec. 28 in the Twp.; 28. west along the north boundary of Secs. 28, 29 and 30 in the Twp. and the north boundary of Secs. 25, 26, 27 and 28 to the east boundary of Sec. 29 in Twp. 34, Rge. 26 W4; 29. south along the east boundary of Secs. 29, 20, 17 and 8 to the north boundary of Sec. 5; 30. west along the north boundary of Secs. 5 and 6 in the Twp. and Secs. 1, 2, 3, 4, 5 and 6 to the east boundary of Rge. 28 W4; 31. south along the east boundary to the north boundary of Twp. 33; 32. west along the north boundary of Twp. 33 to the east boundary of Sec. 2 in Twp. 34, Rge. 2 W5; 33. north along the east boundary of Sec. 2 to the north boundary of Sec. 2; 34. west along the north boundary of Sec. 2 to the east boundary of Sec. 10 in the Twp.; 35. north along the east boundary of Sec. 10 to the north boundary of Sec. 10; 36. west along the north boundary of Secs. 10, 9, 8 and 7 in the Twp. and Secs. 12, 11, 10, 9, 8 and 7 in Twp. 34, Rge. 3 W5 and the north boundary of Sec. 12 in Twp. 34, Rge. 4 W5 to the east boundary of Sec. 14; 37. north along the east boundary of Secs. 14 and 23 to the north boundary of Sec. 23, Twp. 34, Rge. 4 W5 (Highway 587); 38. west along the north boundary of Secs. 23 and 22 (Highway 587) to the east boundary of Sec. 28 in Twp. 34, Rge. 4 W5; 39. north along the east boundary of Secs. 28 and 33 in the Twp. and the east boundary of Secs. 4, 9, 16, 21, 28 and 33 in Twp. 35 and the east boundary of Sec. 4 in Twp. 36, Rge. 4 W5 to the north boundary of Sec. 4 in Twp. 36; 40. west along the north boundary of Secs. 4, 5 and 6 in the Twp. to the east boundary of Rge. 5 W5; 41. north along the east boundary to the north boundary of Sec. 30 in Twp. 36, Rge. 4 W5; 42. east along the north boundary of Secs. 30, 29, 28, 27, 26 and 25 in the Twp. to the east boundary of Rge. 4 W5; 43. north along the east boundary to the starting point.
Note:

64 Innisfail-Sylvan Lake 2010 Boundaries
Bordering Districts
North	East	West	South
Lacombe-Ponoka, Red Deer-North and Red Deer-South	Drumheller-Stettler	Rimbey-Rocky Mountain House-Sundre	Olds-Didsbury-Three Hills
Legal description from the Statutes of Alberta 2010, Electoral Divisions Act.

=== Representation history ===
Members of the Legislative Assembly for Innisfail-Sylvan Lake
Assembly	Years	Member	Party
See Innisfail 1905-1993 and Rocky Mountain House 1940-1993
23rd	1993-1997	Gary Severtson	Progressive Conservative
24th	1997-2001	Gary Severtson	Progressive Conservative
25th	2001-2004	Luke Ouellette	Progressive Conservative
26th	2004-2008	Luke Ouellette	Progressive Conservative
27th	2008-2012	Luke Ouellette	Progressive Conservative
28th	2012–2014	Kerry Towle	Wildrose
28th	2014–2015	Kerry Towle	Progressive Conservative
29th	2015–2017	Don MacIntyre	Wildrose
29th	2017–2018	Don MacIntyre	United Conservative
29th	2018	Don MacIntyre	Independent
29th	2018	Vacant	
29th	2018–2019	Devin Dreeshen	United Conservative
30th	2019–2023	Devin Dreeshen	United Conservative
31st	2023–present	Devin Dreeshen	United Conservative

The electoral district was created in the 1993 boundary redistribution from the old Innisfail riding. The first election held in 1993 saw incumbent Progressive Conservative Gary Severtson win the electoral district with over 50% of the popular vote. He was re-elected again in the 1997 general election, with an increase in his margin of victory nearly winning a landslide. Severtson retired at dissolution in 2001.

Luke Ouellette won his first election as a Progressive Conservative candidate in 2001. In that election he won nearly 75% of the popular vote to hold the seat. He was re-elected to a second term in the 2004 election. He fended off a strong challenge from Alberta Alliance leader Randy Thorsteinson.

Premier Ralph Klein appointed Ouelette to the cabinet after the 2004 election. He ran for a third term in the 2008 general election and won a larger vote share. However, he was defeated in 2012 by Wildrose candidate Kerry Towle.

Towle subsequently crossed the floor to the governing PCs in protest of Danielle Smith's leadership of the Wildrose Party, and would be followed shortly thereafter by Smith herself and a majority of the Wildrose caucus. Although most of these floor-crossers were not able to stand in the 2015 election, Towle defended her seat as a Progressive Conservative, but was soundly defeated by Wildrose candidate Don MacIntyre. He changed affiliations when the two parties merged, sitting with the new United Conservative (UCP) caucus for one sitting of the Legislature.

However, allegations against MacIntyre in early 2018 prompted him to resign from caucus, and shortly thereafter as MLA. The resulting by-election was won easily by UCP candidate Devin Dreeshen, son of MP Earl Dreeshen.

== Election results ==
=== Graphical summary ===
1993
5.2%	21.7%	53.6%	13.8%	4.9%
NDP	Liberal	Progressive Conservative	Alliance	SC

1997
5.0%	18.8%	59.6%	16.7%
NDP	Liberal	Progressive Conservative	Social Credit

2001
5.0%	20.4%	74.7%
NDP	Liberal	Progressive Conservative

2004
5.2%	16.2%	55.4%	20.0%	3.2%
NDP	Liberal	Progressive Conservative	Alliance	SC

2008
4.9%	6.3%	13.9%	62.8%	11.0%
G	NDP	Liberal	Progressive Conservative	WA

2012
4.6%	4.2%	4.9%	40.1%	46.2%
NDP	Liberal	Alberta	Progressive Conservative	Wildrose

2015
23.2%	6.2%	28.0%	42.7%
NDP	Alberta	Progressive Conservative	Wildrose

2018
9.3%	7.4%	81.7%
NDP	Alberta	United Conservative

2019
13.5%	9.2%	74.5%
NDP	Alberta	United Conservative

2023
24.9%	3.5%	71.6%
NDP		United Conservative

=== Elections in the 2020s ===
2023 Alberta general election
Party	Candidate	Votes	%	±%
United Conservative	Devin Dreeshen	16,385	71.61	-2.94
New Democratic	Jason Heistad	5,700	24.91	+11.38
Alberta Independence	David Reid	276	1.21	–
Wildrose Independence	Jeevan Mangat	240	1.05	–
Solidarity Movement	Brandon Pringle	149	0.65	–
Reform	Randy Thorsteinson	132	0.58	+0.27
Total		22,882	99.42	–
Rejected and declined		134	0.58	
Turnout		23,016	61.38	
Eligible voters		37,497		
United Conservative hold		Swing		-7.16
Source(s) Source: Elections Alberta

=== Elections in the 2010s ===
2019 Alberta general election
Party	Candidate	Votes	%	±%
United Conservative	Devin Dreeshen	19,030	74.55%	-7.12%
New Democratic	Robyn O'Brien	3,453	13.53%	4.22%
Alberta Party	Danielle Klooster	2,337	9.15%	1.71%
Freedom Conservative	Chad Miller	359	1.41%	–
Alberta Advantage	Brian Vanderkley	164	0.64%	–
Independent	Ed Wychopen	106	0.42%	–
Reform	Lauren Thorsteinson	79	0.31%	–
Total		25,528	–	–
Rejected, spoiled and declined		31	57	10
Eligible electors / turnout		34,873	73.32%	17.93%
United Conservative gain from Wildrose		Swing		23.17%
Source(s) Source: "66 - Innisfail-Sylvan Lake, 2019 Alberta general election". officialresults.elections.ab.ca. Elections Alberta. Alberta. Chief Electoral Officer (2019). 2019 General Election. A Report of the Chief Electoral Officer. Volume II (PDF) (Report). Vol. 2. Edmonton, Alta.: Elections Alberta. pp. 302–308. ISBN 978-1-988620-12-1.

Alberta provincial by-election, July 12, 2018 upon the resignation of Don MacIntyre on February 2, 2018
Party	Candidate	Votes	%	±%
United Conservative	Devin Dreeshen	8,029	81.67	+10.99
New Democratic	Nicole Mooney	915	9.31	-13.83
Alberta Party	Abigail Douglass	731	7.44	+1.25
Liberal	Nicolaas Jansen	93	0.95	—
Independent	David Inscho	63	0.64	—
Total valid votes		9,831		
Rejected, spoiled, and declined		37		
Turnout		9,868	31.22	-24.27
Eligible voters		31,604		
United Conservative notional hold		Swing		+12.41
Source(s) Elections Alberta. "Election results".

2015 Alberta general election
Party	Candidate	Votes	%	±%
Wildrose	Don MacIntyre	7,829	42.68	-3.54
Progressive Conservative	Kerry Towle	5,136	28.00	-12.06
New Democratic	Patricia Norman	4,244	23.14	+18.47
Alberta Party	Danielle Klooster	1,135	6.19	+1.31
Total		18,344	99.48	
Rejected, spoiled, and declined		95	0.52	-0.26
Turnout		18,439	55.49	+0.65
Eligible voters		33,227		
Wildrose hold		Swing		+4.26
Source(s) Elections Alberta. "Electoral Division Results, 64 - INNISFAIL-SYLVAN LAKE".

2012 Alberta general election
Party	Candidate	Votes	%	±%
Wildrose	Kerry Towle	7,084	46.22	+35.26
Progressive Conservative	Luke Ouellette	6,140	40.06	-22.76
Alberta Party	Danielle Klooster	747	4.87	
New Democratic	Patricia Norman	715	4.66	-1.67
Liberal	Les Vidok	642	4.19	-9.69
Total		15,328	99.22	
Rejected, spoiled, and declined		120	0.78	
Turnout		15,488	54.84	
Eligible voters		28,167		
Wildrose gain from Progressive Conservative		Swing		+29.01
Source(s) Elections Alberta. "Electoral Division Results, 64 - INNISFAIL-SYLVAN LAKE".

=== Elections in the 2000s ===
2008 Alberta general election
Party	Candidate	Votes	%	±%
Progressive Conservative	Luke Ouellette	6,967	62.82	+7.44
Liberal	Garth Davis	1,539	13.88	-2.33
Wildrose Alliance	Wayne Edmundson	1,215	10.96	-9.03
New Democratic	Tophie Davis	702	6.33	+1.11
Greens	Lisa Grant	545	4.91	
Independent	Anthony Haggarty	122	1.10	
Total		11,090	100.00	
Rejected, spoiled, and declined		51		
Eligible electors / Turnout		29,348	37.96	-8.78
Progressive Conservative hold		Swing		+4.86
Source(s) The Report on the March 3, 2008 Provincial General Election of the Twenty-seventh Legislative Assembly. Elections Alberta. July 28, 2008. pp. 438–443.

2004 Alberta general election
Party	Candidate	Votes	%	±%
Progressive Conservative	Luke Ouellette	6,208	55.38	-19.27
Alberta Alliance	Randy Thorsteinson	2,241	19.99	
Liberal	Garth Davis	1,817	16.21	-4.14
New Democratic	Chris Janke	585	5.22	+0.22
Social Credit	Wilf Tricker	359	3.20	
Total		11,210	100.00	
Rejected, spoiled, and declined		48		
Eligible electors / Turnout		24,087	46.74	-7.71
Progressive Conservative hold		Swing		-19.63
Source(s) "Innisfail-Sylvan Lake Statement of Official Results 2004 Alberta general election" (PDF). Elections Alberta.

2001 Alberta general election
Party	Candidate	Votes	%	±%
Progressive Conservative	Luke Ouellette	9,725	74.65	+15.03
Liberal	Garth Davis	2,652	20.35	+1.59
New Democratic	Eileen Teslenko	651	5.00	+0.04
Total		13,028	100.00	
Rejected, spoiled and declined		55		
Eligible electors / Turnout		24,028	54.45	-2.34
Progressive Conservative hold		Swing		+8.31
Source(s) "Innisfail-Sylvan Lake Official Results 2001 Alberta general election" (PDF). Elections Alberta.

=== Elections in the 1990s ===
1997 Alberta general election
Party	Candidate	Votes	%	±%
Progressive Conservative	Gary Severtson	7,012	59.62	+6.03
Liberal	Ray Reckseidler	2,206	18.76	-2.96
Social Credit	Carl Thorsteinson	1,960	16.66	+11.74
New Democratic	Linda Neilson	583	4.96	-0.19
Total		11,761	100.00	
Rejected, spoiled and declined		18		
Eligible electors / Turnout		20,741	56.79	-7.33
Progressive Conservative hold		Swing		+4.50
Source(s) "1997 General Election". Elections Alberta. Archived from the original on February 14, 2012.

1993 Alberta general election
Party	Candidate	Votes	%
Progressive Conservative	Gary Severtson	5,660	53.59
Liberal	Daryl Beck	2,294	21.72
Alliance	George Flake	1,381	13.08
New Democratic	Reg Stotz	544	5.15
Social Credit	Norm Bjornson	520	4.92
Independent	Len Scott	163	1.54
Total		10,562	100.00
Rejected, spoiled and declined		22	
Eligible electors / Turnout		16,507	64.12
Progressive Conservative pickup new district.			
Source(s) "Innisfail-Sylvan Lake results 1993 Alberta general election". Alberta Heritage Community Foundation. Archived from the original on November 3, 2010.

== Referendum results ==
2026 Alberta referendum
Side	Votes	%
Remain	15,028	56.77
Referendum	11,446	43.23

== Senate nominee election results ==
=== 2004 ===
2004 Senate nominee election results: Innisfail-Sylvan Lake				Turnout 46.50%	
Affiliation	Candidate	Votes	% votes	% ballots	Rank
Progressive Conservative	Bert Brown	4,898	15.34%	50.13%	1
Progressive Conservative	Betty Unger	4,418	13.83%	45.22%	2
Progressive Conservative	Cliff Breitkreuz	3,466	10.85%	35.47%	3
Alberta Alliance	Michael Roth	3,175	9.94%	32.49%	7
Independent	Link Byfield	3,116	9.76%	31.89%	4
Progressive Conservative	Jim Silye	3,061	9.58%	31.33%	5
Progressive Conservative	David Usherwood	2,887	9.04%	29.55%	6
Alberta Alliance	Vance Gough	2,729	8.54%	27.93%	8
Alberta Alliance	Gary Horan	2,524	7.90%	25.83%	10
Independent	Tom Sindlinger	1,665	5.22%	17.04%	9
Total votes		31,939	100%		
Total ballots		9,771	3.27 votes per ballot		
Rejected, spoiled and declined		1,429			

Voters had the option of selecting four candidates on the ballot

== Student vote results ==
=== 2004 ===
Participating schools
Bowden Grandview
Delburne School
Poplar Ridge School
Spruce View School

On November 19, 2004, a student vote was conducted at participating Alberta schools to parallel the 2004 Alberta general election results. The vote was designed to educate students and simulate the electoral process for persons who have not yet reached the legal majority. The vote was conducted in 80 of the 83 provincial electoral districts with students voting for actual election candidates. Schools with a large student body that reside in another electoral district had the option to vote for candidates outside of the electoral district then where they were physically located.

2004 Alberta student vote results
Affiliation	Candidate	Votes	%
Progressive Conservative	Luke Ouellette	233	55.48%
Alberta Alliance	Randy Thorsteinson	63	15.00%
Liberal	Garth Davis	43	10.24%
Social Credit	Wilf Tricker	41	9.76%
NDP	Chris Janke	40	9.52%
Total		420	100%
Rejected, spoiled and declined		13	

=== 2012 ===
2012 Alberta student vote results
Affiliation	Candidate	Votes	%
Progressive Conservative	Luke Ouellette		%
Wildrose	Kerry Towle		
Liberal	Les Vidok		%
Alberta Party	Danielle Klooster		
NDP	Patricia Norman		%
Total			100%

== See also ==
- List of Alberta provincial electoral districts
- Canadian provincial electoral districts
