= Red Deer—Mountain View =

Defunct federal electoral district in Alberta, Canada

Alberta electoral district
- Red Deer—Mountain View in relation to other Alberta federal electoral districts as of the 2013 Representation Order.

Defunct federal electoral district
- Legislature: House of Commons
- District created: 2013
- District abolished: 2023
- First contested: 2015
- Last contested: 2021
- District webpage: profile, map

Demographics
- Population (2011): 110,793
- Electors (2019): 89,098
- Area (km²): 7,659
- Census division(s): Division No. 6, Division No. 8
- Census subdivision(s): Carstairs, Didsbury, Innisfail, Mountain View, Olds, Penhold, Red Deer, Red Deer County, Sundre

Red Deer—Mountain View is a former federal electoral district in Alberta, Canada, that was represented in the House of Commons of Canada from 2015 to 2025.

Red Deer—Mountain View was created by the 2012 federal electoral boundaries redistribution and was legally defined in the 2013 representation order. It came into effect upon the call of the 42nd Canadian federal election, scheduled for October 2015. It was created mostly out of the southern half of Red Deer, including downtown, combined with small portions of Crowfoot and Wild Rose.

== Demographics ==
Panethnic groups in Red Deer—Mountain View (2011−2021)
| Panethnic group | 2021 | | 2016 | | 2011 | |
| Panethnic group | Pop. | % | Pop. | % | Pop. | % |
|---|---|---|---|---|---|---|
| European (Note: Statistic includes all persons that did not make up part of a visible minority or an indigenous identity.) | 99,225 | 84.97% | 101,180 | 87.35% | 97,445 | 90.55% |
| Indigenous | 6,585 | 5.64% | 5,365 | 4.63% | 4,255 | 3.95% |
| Southeast Asian (Note: Statistic includes total responses of "Filipino" and "Southeast Asian" under visible minority section on census.) | 4,560 | 3.9% | 3,725 | 3.22% | 2,010 | 1.87% |
| South Asian | 1,820 | 1.56% | 1,290 | 1.11% | 1,000 | 0.93% |
| East Asian (Note: Statistic includes total responses of "Chinese", "Korean", and "Japanese" under visible minority section on census.) | 1,340 | 1.15% | 1,375 | 1.19% | 1,095 | 1.02% |
| African | 1,135 | 0.97% | 1,170 | 1.01% | 685 | 0.64% |
| Latin American | 975 | 0.83% | 925 | 0.8% | 565 | 0.53% |
| Middle Eastern (Note: Statistic includes total responses of "West Asian" and "Arab" under visible minority section on census.) | 510 | 0.44% | 545 | 0.47% | 185 | 0.17% |
| Other/multiracial (Note: Statistic includes total responses of "Visible minority, n.i.e." and "Multiple visible minorities" under visible minority section on census.) | 620 | 0.53% | 260 | 0.22% | 365 | 0.34% |
| Total responses | 116,780 | 96.72% | 115,830 | 97.32% | 107,610 | 97.13% |
| Total population | 120,739 | 100% | 119,019 | 100% | 110,793 | 100% |
Notes: Totals greater than 100% due to multiple origin responses. Demographics based on 2012 Canadian federal electoral redistribution riding boundaries.

== Members of Parliament ==
This riding has elected the following members of the House of Commons of Canada:

| Parliament | Years | Member | Party |
|---|---|---|---|
Red Deer—Mountain View; Riding created from Crowfoot, Red Deer, and Wild Rose
| 42nd | 2015–2019 | Earl Dreeshen | Conservative |
| 43rd | 2019–2021 | Earl Dreeshen | Conservative |
| 44th | 2021–2025 | Earl Dreeshen | Conservative |
Riding dissolved into Ponoka—Didsbury, Red Deer, and Yellowhead

== Election results ==
View chart definition.
Graph of election results in Red Deer—Mountain View (minor parties that never got 2% of the vote or didn't run consistently are omitted)

2021 Canadian federal election
| Party | Candidate | Votes | % | ±% | Expenditures |
|---|---|---|---|---|---|
| Conservative | Earl Dreeshen | 40,680 | 64.25 | –16.09 | $45,854.58 |
| New Democratic | Marie Grabowski | 8,826 | 13.94 | +6.68 | $1,984.50 |
| People's | Kelly Lorencz | 7,581 | 11.97 | +8.11 | $15,849.66 |
| Liberal | Olumide Adewumi | 4,084 | 6.45 | +0.88 | $3,861.08 |
| Maverick | Mark Wilcox | 1,640 | 2.59 | – | $10,797.74 |
| Independent | Clayten Willington | 298 | 0.47 | – | none listed |
| Libertarian | Jared Pilon | 211 | 0.33 | – | $1,193.15 |
| Total valid votes/expense limit | | 63,320 | 99.56 | – | $117,712.35 |
| Total rejected ballots | | 278 | 0.44 | +0.03 | |
| Turnout | | 63,598 | 70.29 | –5.04 | |
| Eligible voters | | 90,474 | | | |
| Conservative hold | | Swing | | –11.39 | |
Source: Elections Canada

2019 Canadian federal election
| Party | Candidate | Votes | % | ±% | Expenditures |
|---|---|---|---|---|---|
| Conservative | Earl Dreeshen | 54,765 | 80.34 | +6.00 | $61,955.02 |
| New Democratic | Logan Garbanewski | 4,946 | 7.26 | –1.16 | $4,683.86 |
| Liberal | Gary Tremblay | 3,795 | 5.57 | –7.86 | $2,038.71 |
| People's | Paul Mitchell | 2,637 | 3.87 | – | $15,053.69 |
| Green | Conner Borlé | 2,026 | 2.97 | +0.37 | $87.00 |
| Total valid votes/expense limit | | 68,169 | 99.59 | – | $114,110.55 |
| Total rejected ballots | | 278 | 0.41 | +0.19 | |
| Turnout | | 68,447 | 75.33 | +4.74 | |
| Eligible voters | | 90,857 | | | |
| Conservative hold | | Swing | | +6.93 | |
Source: Elections Canada

2015 Canadian federal election
| Party | Candidate | Votes | % | ±% | Expenditures |
|---|---|---|---|---|---|
| Conservative | Earl Dreeshen | 46,245 | 74.33 | –5.04 | $75,604.03 |
| Liberal | Chandra Lescia Kastern | 8,356 | 13.43 | +9.89 | $9,454.54 |
| New Democratic | Paul Harris | 5,233 | 8.41 | –3.49 | $13,948.08 |
| Green | Simon Oleny | 1,621 | 2.61 | –2.44 | none listed |
| Libertarian | James Walper | 445 | 0.72 | – | $1,554.01 |
| Pirate | Scott Milne | 312 | 0.50 | – | $155.90 |
| Total valid votes/expense limit | | 62,212 | 99.78 | – | $225,554.46 |
| Total rejected ballots | | 135 | 0.22 | – | |
| Turnout | | 62,347 | 70.59 | – | |
| Eligible voters | | 88,322 | | | |
| Conservative hold | | Swing | | –7.46 | |
Source: Elections Canada

2011 federal election redistributed results
| Party | Vote | % |
|---|---|---|
| Conservative | 37,507 | 79.37 |
| New Democratic | 5,626 | 11.91 |
| Green | 2,384 | 5.04 |
| Liberal | 1,673 | 3.54 |
| Others | 65 | 0.14 |

== See also ==
- List of Canadian electoral districts
- Historical federal electoral districts of Canada
