= Results of the 2011 Canadian federal election by riding =

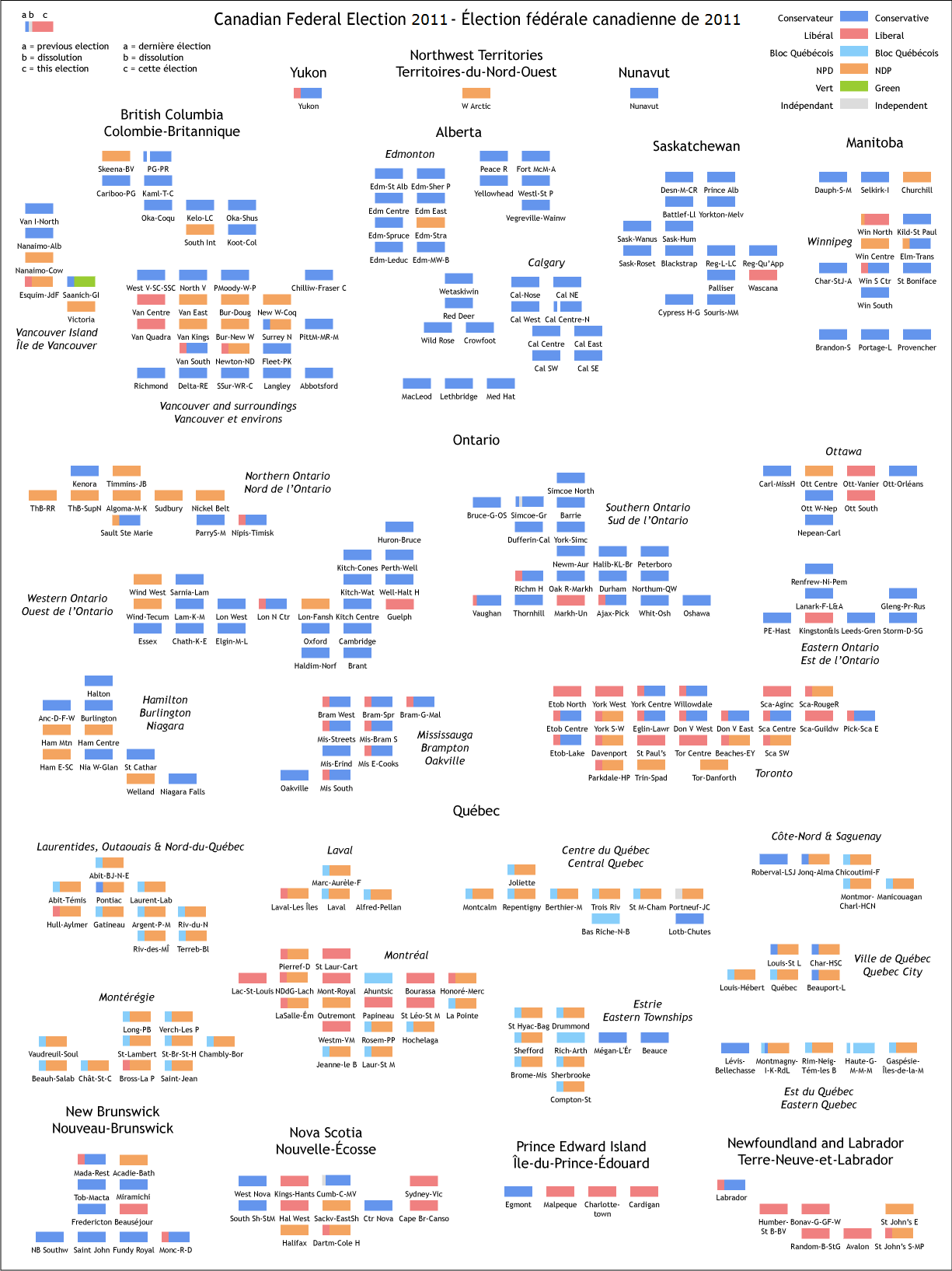
Analysis of results by riding, together with comparisons from previous election and at dissolution

Abbreviations guide

- (Ind.) - **Independent**
- (NA) - **No affiliation**
- Minor parties:
  - (AAEVP) - **Animal Alliance Environment Voters Party**
  - (CAP) - **Canadian Action Party**
  - (CHP) - **Christian Heritage Party**
  - (Comm.) - **Communist Party**
  - (FPNP) - **First Peoples National Party**
  - (Libert.) - **Libertarian Party**
  - (Mar.) - **Marijuana Party**
  - (M-L) - **Marxist–Leninist Party**
  - (PC) - **Progressive Canadian Party**
  - (Pirate) - **Pirate Party**
  - (Rhino) - **Rhinoceros Party**
  - (United) - **United Party**
  - (WBP) - **Western Block Party**
- Note that names in **boldface type** represent party leaders.
- Names are as registered with Elections Canada.

== Newfoundland and Labrador ==
Electoral district	Candidates					Incumbent
Electoral district	Conservative	Liberal	NDP	Green	Other	Incumbent
Avalon	Fabian Manning; 14,749; 40.51%	Scott Andrews; 16,008; 43.97%	Matthew Martin Fuchs; 5,157; 14.16%	Matt Crowder; 218; 0.60%	Randy Wayne Dawe (Ind.); 276; 0.76%	Scott Andrews
Bonavista—Gander— Grand Falls—Windsor	Aaron Hynes; 8,595; 27.59%	Scott Simms; 17,977; 57.70%	Clyde Bridger; 4,306; 13.82%	Robyn Kenny; 279; 0.90%		Scott Simms
Humber—St. Barbe— Baie Verte	Trevor Taylor; 7,559; 25.18%	Gerry Byrne; 17,119; 57.04%	Shelley Senior; 4,751; 15.83%	Robin Blair Gosse; 253; 0.84%	Wayne R. Bennett (Ind.); 332; 1.11%	Gerry Byrne
Labrador	Peter Penashue; 4,256; 39.81%	Todd Russell; 4,177; 39.07%	Jacob Larkin; 2,120; 19.83%	George C.R. Barrett; 139; 1.30%		Todd Russell
Random—Burin— St. George's	John Ottenheimer; 8,322; 32.00%	Judy Foote; 12,914; 49.65%	Stella Magalios; 4,465; 17.17%	Tanya Gutmanis; 307; 1.18%		Judy Foote
St. John's East	Jerry Byrne; 9,198; 20.87%	John Allan; 3,019; 6.85%	Jack Harris; 31,388; 71.22%	Robert Miller; 467; 1.06%		Jack Harris
St. John's South— Mount Pearl	Loyola Sullivan; 8,883; 22.79%	Siobhán Coady; 11,130; 28.55%	Ryan Cleary; 18,681; 47.92%	Rick Austin; 291; 0.75%		Siobhán Coady

== Prince Edward Island ==
Electoral district	Candidates					Incumbent
Electoral district	Conservative	Liberal	NDP	Green	Christian Heritage	Incumbent
Cardigan	Mike Currie; 8,107; 38.37%	Lawrence MacAulay; 10,486; 49.63%	Lorne Cudmore; 2,164; 10.24%	Leslie Stewart; 373; 1.77%		Lawrence MacAulay
Charlottetown	Donna Profit; 6,040; 32.71%	Sean Casey; 7,292; 39.48%	Joe Byrne; 4,632; 25.08%	Eliza Knockwood; 417; 2.26%	Baird Judson; 87; 0.47%	Shawn Murphy†
Egmont	Gail Shea; 10,467; 54.65%	Guy Gallant; 5,997; 31.31%	Jacquie Robichaud; 2,369; 12.37%	Carl Anthony Arnold; 320; 1.67%		Gail Shea
Malpeque	Tim Ogilvie; 7,934; 39.10%	Wayne Easter; 8,605; 42.40%	Rita Jackson; 2,970; 14.63%	Peter Bevan-Baker; 785; 3.87%		Wayne Easter

== Nova Scotia ==
Electoral district	Candidates					Incumbent
Electoral district	Conservative	Liberal	NDP	Green	Other	Incumbent
Cape Breton—Canso	Derrick Clarence Kennedy; 10,873; 30.65%	Rodger Cuzner; 16,478; 46.45%	Marney Jeanne Simmons; 6,984; 19.69%	Glen Carabin; 1,141; 3.22%		Rodger Cuzner
Central Nova	Peter G. McKay; 21,593; 56.79%	John R. Hamilton; 5,614; 14.76%	David K. Parker; 9,412; 24.75%	Matthew Chisholm; 1,406; 3.70%		Peter MacKay
Cumberland—Colchester—Musquodoboit Valley	Scott Armstrong; 21,041; 52.46%	Jim Burrows; 7,264; 18.11%	Wendy Robinson; 9,322; 23.24%	Jason Blanch; 2,109; 5.26%	**Jim Hnatiuk** (CHP); 375; 0.93%	Scott Armstrong
Dartmouth—Cole Harbour	Wanda Webber; 10,702; 24.76%	Mike Savage; 15,181; 35.12%	Robert Chisholm; 15,678; 36.27%	Paul Shreenan; 1,662; 3.85%		Michael Savage
Halifax	George Nikolaou; 8,276; 18.00%	Stan Kutcher; 11,793; 25.64%	Megan Leslie; 23,746; 51.63%	Michael Dewar; 2,020; 4.39%	Tony Seed (M-L); 152; 0.33%	Megan Leslie
Halifax West	Bruce Robert Pretty; 13,782; 30.50%	Geoff Regan; 16,230; 35.92%	Gregor Ash; 13,239; 29.30%	Thomas Trappenberg; 1,931; 4.27%		Geoff Regan
Kings—Hants	David Morse; 14,714; 36.63%	Scott Brison; 15,887; 39.56%	Mark Rogers; 8,043; 20.03%	Sheila Richardson; 1,520; 3.78%		Scott Brison
Sackville—Eastern Shore	Adam Mimnagh; 12,662; 30.45%	Scott Hemming; 4,673; 11.24%	Peter Stoffer; 22,483; 54.07%	John Percy; 1,762; 4.24%		Peter Stoffer
South Shore—St. Margaret's	Gerald Keddy; 17,948; 43.15%	Derek Wells; 7,037; 16.92%	Gordon Earle; 15,033; 36.14%	Kris MacLellan; 1,579; 3.80%		Gerald Keddy
Sydney—Victoria	Cecil Clarke; 14,023; 37.85%	Mark Eyking; 14,788; 39.91%	Kathy MacLeod; 7,049; 19.03%	Chris Milburn; 1,191; 3.21%		Mark Eyking
West Nova	Greg Kerr; 20,204; 47.04%	Robert Thibault; 15,632; 36.39%	George Barron; 5,631; 13.11%	Ross Johnson; 1,487; 3.46%		Greg Kerr

== New Brunswick ==
Electoral district	Candidates					Incumbent
Electoral district	Conservative	Liberal	NDP	Green	Other	Incumbent
Acadie—Bathurst	Louis Robichaud; 7,456; 16.20%	Jean Marie Gionet; 6,491; 14.11%	Yvon Godin; 32,067; 69.69%			Yvon Godin
Beauséjour	Evelyne Chapman; 14,811; 33.27%	Dominic LeBlanc; 17,399; 39.08%	Susan Levi-Peters; 10,397; 23.35%	Nathalie Arsenault; 1,913; 4.30%		Dominic LeBlanc
Fredericton	Keith Ashfield; 21,573; 48.38%	Randy McKeen; 10,336; 23.18%	Jesse Travis; 10,626; 23.83%	Louise Anna-Marie Comeau; 1,790; 4.01%	Adam Scott Ness (Ind.); 266; 0.60%	Keith Ashfield
Fundy Royal	Rob Moore; 21,206; 58.14%	Linda Wilhelm; 3,668; 10.06%	Darryl Pitre; 9,845; 26.99%	Stephanie Coburn; 1,757; 4.82%		Rob Moore
Madawaska—Restigouche	Bernard Valcourt; 14,224; 40.64%	Jean-Claude JC D'Amours; 12,309; 35.17%	Widler Jules; 6,562; 18.75%	Lynn Morrison; 612; 1.75%	Louis Bérubé (Ind.); 1,290; 3.69%	Jean-Claude D'Amours
Miramichi	Tilly O'Neill Gordon; 16,112; 52.41%	Keith Vickers; 6,800; 22.12%	Patrick Colford; 7,097; 23.08%	Ronald Mazerolle; 735; 2.39%		Tilly O'Neill-Gordon
Moncton—Riverview— Dieppe	Robert Goguen; 17,408; 35.73%	Brian Murphy; 15,247; 32.19%	Shawna Gagné; 14,053; 28.84%	Steven Steeves; 2,016; 4.14%		Brian Murphy
New Brunswick Southwest	John Williamson; 18,066; 56.64%	Kelly Wilson; 4,320; 13.54%	Andrew Graham; 7,413; 23.24%	Janice Harvey; 1,646; 5.16%	Jason Farris (CHP); 450; 1.41%	Greg Thompson†
Saint John	Rodney Weston; 18,456; 49.73%	Stephen Chase; 5,964; 16.07%	Rob Moir; 11,382; 30.67%	Sharon Murphy-Flatt; 1,017; 2.74%	Arthur Jr. Watson (Ind.); 294; 0.79%	Rodney Weston
Tobique—Mactaquac	Mike Allen; 21,108; 62.70%	Chuck Chiasson; 5,337; 15.85%	Pierre Cyr; 6,388; 18.98%	Rish McGlynn; 831; 2.47%		Mike Allen

== Quebec ==
=== Eastern Quebec ===
Electoral district	Candidates					Incumbent
Electoral district	BQ	Conservative	Liberal	NDP	Green	Incumbent
Gaspésie—Îles-de-la-Madeleine	Daniel Côté; 11,650; 31.64%	Régent Bastien; 6,292; 17.09%	Jules Duguay; 5,533; 15.03%	Philip Toone; 12,427; 33.76%	Julien Leblanc; 913; 2.48%	Raynald Blais†
Haute-Gaspésie—La Mitis—Matane—Matapédia	Jean-François Fortin; 12,633; 36.05%	Allen Cormier; 5,253; 14.99%	Nancy Charest; 8,964; 25.58%	Joanie Boulet; 7,484; 21.36%	Louis Drainville; 707; 2.02%	Vacant (Note: Seat left vacant after Bloc MP Jean-Yves Roy resigned in October 2010.)
Lévis—Bellechasse	Danielle-Maude Gosselin; 8,757; 14.89%	Steven Blaney; 25,850; 43.95%	Francis Laforesterie; 3,421; 5.82%	Nicole Laliberté; 19,890; 33.81%	Sacha Douge; 903; 1.54%	Steven Blaney
Montmagny—L'Islet—Kamouraska—Rivière-du-Loup	Nathalie Arsenault; 9,550; 20.09%	Bernard Généreux; 17,276; 36.34%	Andrew Caddell; 2,743; 5.77%	François Lapointe; 17,285; 36.36%	Lynette Tremblay; 691; 1.45%	Bernard Généreux
Rimouski-Neigette—Témiscouata—Les Basques	Claude Guimond; 13,170; 30.83%	Bertin Denis; 6,218; 14.56%	Pierre Cadieux; 4,101; 9.60%	Guy Caron; 18,360; 42.98%	Clément Pelletier; 867; 2.03%	Claude Guimond

=== Côte-Nord and Saguenay ===
Electoral district	Candidates						Incumbent
Electoral district	BQ	Conservative	Liberal	NDP	Green	Rhinoceros	Incumbent
Chicoutimi—Le Fjord	Robert Bouchard; 14,675; 28.80%	Carol Néron; 12,881; 25.28%	Marc Pettersen; 2,852; 5.60%	Dany Morin; 19,430; 38.13%	Charles-Olivier Bolduc-Tremblay; 780; 1.53%	Marielle Couture; 340; 0.67%	Robert Bouchard
Jonquière—Alma	Pierre Forest; 9,554; 18.12%	Jean-Pierre Blackburn; 18,569; 35.22%	Claude Ringuette; 1,043; 1.98%	Claude Patry; 22,900; 43.44%	France Bergeron; 652; 1.24%		Jean-Pierre Blackburn
Manicouagan	Gérard Asselin; 10,495; 31.24%	Gordon Ferguson; 3,878; 11.55%	André Forbes (Note: André Forbes was on the ballot as a Liberal candidate, but was no longer endorsed by the party.); 1,882; 5.60%	Jonathan Genest-Jourdain; 16,437; 48.93%	Jacques Gélineau; 898; 2.67%		Gérard Asselin
Montmorency—Charlevoix— Haute-Côte-Nord	Michel Guimond; 16,425; 34.85%	Michel-Eric Castonguay; 9,660; 20.50%	Robert Gauthier; 2,628; 5.58%	Jonathan Tremblay; 17,601; 37.35%	François Bédard; 814; 1.73%		Michel Guimond
Roberval—Lac-Saint-Jean	Claude Pilote; 8,577; 21.25%	Denis Lebel; 18,438; 45.68%	Bernard Garneau; 1,615; 4.00%	Yvon Guay; 11,182; 27.70%	Steeve Simard; 553; 1.37%		Denis Lebel

=== Quebec City ===
Electoral district	Candidates							Incumbent
Electoral district	BQ	Conservative	Liberal	NDP	Green	Christian Heritage	Marxist-Leninist	Incumbent
Beauport—Limoilou	Michel Létourneau; 10,250; 19.43%	Sylvie Boucher; 13,845; 26.24%	Lorraine Chartier; 3,162; 5.99%	Raymond Côté; 24,306; 46.07%	Louise Courville; 950; 1.80%	Anne-Marie Genest; 124; 0.24%	Claude Moreau; 122; 0.23%	Sylvie Boucher
Charlesbourg—Haute-Saint-Charles	Félix Grenier; 8,732; 16.29%	Daniel Petit; 16,220; 30.26%	Martine Gaudreault; 3,505; 6.54%	Anne-Marie Day; 24,131; 45.01%	Simon Verret; 832; 1.55%	Simon Cormier; 189; 0.35%		Daniel Petit
Louis-Hébert	Pascal-Pierre Paillé; 14,640; 24.21%	Pierre Paul-Hus; 13,207; 21.84%	Jean Beaupré; 8,110; 13.41%	Denis Blanchette; 23,373; 38.65%	Michelle Fontaine; 996; 1.65%	Marie-Claude Bouffard; 143; 0.24%		Pascal-Pierre Paillé
Louis-Saint-Laurent	France Gagné; 8,148; 14.36%	Josée Verner; 21,334; 37.59%	Philippe Mérel; 3,612; 6.36%	Alexandrine Latendresse; 22,629; 39.87%	Jean Cloutier; 857; 1.51%	Daniel Arseneault; 175; 0.31%		Josée Verner
Québec	Christiane Gagnon; 14,684; 27.96%	Pierre Morasse; 9,330; 17.77%	François Payeur; 4,735; 9.02%	Annick Papillon; 22,393; 42.64%	Yvan Dutil; 1,144; 2.18%	Stefan Jetchick; 228; 0.43%		Christiane Gagnon

=== Central Quebec ===
Electoral district	Candidates						Incumbent
Electoral district	BQ	Conservative	Liberal	NDP	Green	Other	Incumbent
Bas-Richelieu—Nicolet— Bécancour	Louis Plamondon; 19,046; 38.30%	Charles Cartier; 6,478; 13.03%	Rhéal Blais; 5,024; 10.10%	Krista Lalonde; 17,705; 35.60%	Anne-Marie Tanguay; 1,479; 2.97%		Louis Plamondon
Berthier—Maskinongé	Guy André; 16,668; 29.45%	Marie-Claude Godue; 7,904; 13.96%	Francine Gaudet; 8,060; 14.24%	Ruth Ellen Brosseau; 22,403; 39.58%	Léonie Matteau; 1,196; 2.11%	Martin Jubinville (Rhino); 373; 0.66%	Guy André
Joliette	Pierre A. Paquette; 18,804; 32.90%	Michel Morand; 5,525; 9.67%	François Boucher; 3,545; 6.20%	Francine Raynault; 27,050; 47.33%	Annie Durette; 2,227; 3.90%		Pierre Paquette
Lotbinière— Chutes-de-la-Chaudière	Gaston Gourde; 8,381; 14.88%	Jacques Gourde; 22,460; 39.88%	Nicole Larouche; 2,866; 5.09%	Tanya Fredette; 21,683; 38.50%	Richard Domm; 936; 1.66%		Jacques Gourde
Montcalm	Roger Gaudet; 19,609; 30.16%	Jason Fuoco; 5,118; 7.87%	Yves Dufour; 3,501; 5.39%	Manon Perreault; 34,434; 52.97%	Marianne Girard; 2,347; 3.61%		Roger Gaudet
Portneuf—Jacques-Cartier	Richard Côté; 10,745; 20.48%	—	Réjean Thériault; 3,463; 6.60%	Élaine Michaud; 22,387; 42.67%	Claudine Delorme; 1,279; 2.44%	André Arthur (Ind.); 14,594; 27.82%	André Arthur
Repentigny	Nicolas Dufour; 19,242; 31.09%	Christophe Royer; 4,606; 7.44%	Chantal Perreault; 4,830; 7.80%	Jean-François Larose; 32,131; 51.92%	Michel Duchaine; 1,078; 1.74%		Nicolas Dufour
Saint-Maurice—Champlain	Jean-Yves Laforest; 13,961; 29.28%	Jacques Grenier; 8,447; 17.72%	Yves Tousignant; 5,670; 11.89%	Lise St-Denis; 18,628; 39.07%	Pierre Audette; 972; 2.04%		Jean-Yves Laforest
Trois-Rivières	Paule Brunelle; 11,987; 23.80%	Pierre Lacroix; 6,205; 12.32%	Patrice Mangin; 3,617; 7.18%	Robert Aubin; 26,981; 53.57%	Louis Lacroix; 972; 1.93%	Francis Arsenault (Rhino); 256 0.51%	Paule Brunelle
Trois-Rivières	Paule Brunelle; 11,987; 23.80%	Pierre Lacroix; 6,205; 12.32%	Patrice Mangin; 3,617; 7.18%	Robert Aubin; 26,981; 53.57%	Louis Lacroix; 972; 1.93%	Marc-André Fortin (Ind.); 346 0.69%	Paule Brunelle

=== Eastern Townships ===
Electoral district	Candidates						Incumbent
Electoral district	BQ	Conservative	Liberal	NDP	Green	Other	Incumbent
Beauce	Sylvio Morin; 3,535; 6.69%	Maxime Bernier; 26,799; 50.71%	Claude Morin; 5,833; 11.04%	Serge Bergeron; 15,831; 29.95%	Etienne Doyon Lessard; 852; 1.61%		Maxime Bernier
Brome—Missisquoi	Christelle Bogosta; 11,173; 21.26%	Nolan LeBlanc-Bauerle; 6,256; 11.91%	Denis Paradis; 11,589; 22.06%	Pierre Jacob; 22,407; 42.64%	Benoit Lambert; 1,120; 2.13%		Christian Ouellet†
Compton—Stanstead	France Bonsant; 13,179; 26.03%	Sandrine Gressard Bélanger; 5,982; 11.81%	William Hogg; 6,132; 12.11%	Jean Rousseau; 24,097; 47.59%	Gary Caldwell; 1,241; 2.45%		France Bonsant
Drummond	Roger Pomerleau; 10,410; 21.95%	Normand W. Bernier; 7,555; 15.93%	Pierre Côté; 3,979; 8.39%	François Choquette; 24,489; 51.64%	Robin Fortin; 987; 2.08%		Roger Pomerleau
Mégantic—L'Érable	Pierre Turcotte; 7,481; 16.76%	Christian Paradis; 21,931; 49.14%	René Roy; 2,601; 5.83%	Cheryl Voisine; 11,716; 26.25%	Wyatt Tessari; 655; 1.47%	Alain Bergeron (CAP); 250; 0.56%	Christian Paradis
Richmond—Arthabaska	André Bellavance; 18,033; 33.83%	Jean-Philippe Bachand; 13,145; 24.66%	Marie-Josée Talbot; 3,711; 6.96%	Isabelle Maguire; 17,316; 32.49%	Tomy Bombardier; 1,098; 2.06%		André Bellavance
Saint-Hyacinthe—Bagot	Ève-Mary Thaï Thi Lac; 12,651; 24.57%	Jean-Guy Dagenais; 8,108; 15.74%	Denis Vallée; 2,784; 5.41%	Marie-Claude Morin; 26,963; 52.36%	Johany Beaudoin-Bussières; 994; 1.93%		Ève-Mary Thaï Thi Lac
Shefford	Robert Vincent; 12,615; 23.37%	Mélisa Leclerc; 7,908; 14.65%	Bernard Demers; 4,855; 8.99%	Réjean Genest; 27,575; 51.09%	Patrick Daoust; 1,022; 1.89%		Robert Vincent
Sherbrooke	Serge Cardin; 18,665; 35.89%	Pierre Harvey; 4,784; 9.20%	Éric Deslauriers; 5,020; 9.65%	Pierre-Luc Dusseault; 22,415; 43.10%	Jacques Laberge; 894; 1.72%	Crédible Berlingot Landry (Rhino); 233; 0.45%	Serge Cardin

=== Montérégie ===
Electoral district	Candidates						Incumbent
Electoral district	BQ	Conservative	Liberal	NDP	Green	Other	Incumbent
Beauharnois—Salaberry	Claude DeBellefeuille; 18,182; 33.18%	David Couturier; 7,049; 12.87%	François Deslandres; 4,559; 8.32%	Anne Minh-Thu Quach; 23,998; 43.80%	Rémi Pelletier; 1,003; 1.83%		Claude DeBellefeuille
Brossard—La Prairie	Marcel Lussier; 10,890; 17.51%	Maurice Brossard; 7,806; 12.55%	Alexandra Mendès; 16,976; 27.30%	Hoang Mai; 25,512; 41.02%	Kevin Murphy; 900; 1.45%	Normand Chouinard (M-L); 110; 0.18%	Alexandra Mendès
Chambly—Borduas	Yves Lessard; 19,147; 27.65%	Nathalie Ferland Drolet; 5,425; 7.83%	Bernard Delorme; 6,165; 8.90%	Matthew Dubé; 29,591; 42.74%	Nicholas Lescarbeau; 1,072; 1.55%	Jean-François Mercier (Ind.); 7,843; 11.33%	Yves Lessard
Châteauguay— Saint-Constant	Carole Freeman; 14,957; 26.70%	André Turcôt; 5,756; 10.27%	Linda Schwey; 5,069; 9.05%	Sylvain Chicoine; 29,156; 52.04%	Clara Kwan; 923; 1.65%	Linda Sullivan (M-L); 162; 0.29%	Carole Freeman
Longueuil—Pierre-Boucher	Jean Dorion; 14,181; 27.16%	Richard Bélisle; 4,339; 8.31%	Kévan Falsafi; 5,321; 10.19%	Pierre Nantel; 27,119; 51.93%	Valérie St-Amant; 1,032; 1.98%	Serge Patenaude (M-L); 228; 0.44%	Jean Dorion
Saint-Bruno—Saint-Hubert	Carole Lavallée; 15,384; 28.19%	Nicole Charbonneau Barron; 5,887; 10.79%	Michel Picard; 7,423; 13.60%	Djaouida Sellah; 24,361; 44.64%	Germain Denoncourt; 1,523; 2.79%		Carole Lavallée
Saint-Jean	Claude Bachand; 16,023; 30.50%	Jean Thouin; 5,603; 10.66%	Robert David; 4,644; 8.84%	Tarik Brahmi; 24,943; 47.48%	Pierre Tremblay; 1,326; 2.52%		Claude Bachand
Saint-Lambert	Josée Beaudin; 11,353; 25.88%	Qais Hamidi; 4,396; 10.02%	Roxane Stanners; 8,463; 19.30%	Sadia Groguhé; 18,705; 42.65%	Carmen Budilean; 944; 2.15%		Josée Beaudin
Vaudreuil-Soulanges	Meili Faille; 17,781; 25.69%	Marc Boudreau; 11,360; 16.41%	Lyne Pelchat; 8,023; 11.59%	Jamie Nicholls; 30,177; 43.61%	Jean-Yves Massenet; 1,864; 2.69%		Meili Faille
Verchères—Les Patriotes	Luc Malo; 20,593; 36.38%	Rodrigo Alfaro; 4,884; 8.63%	Pier-Luc Therrien-Péloquin; 5,352; 9.46%	Sana Hassainia; 24,514; 43.31%	Thomas Lapierre; 1,259; 2.22%		Luc Malo

=== Eastern Montreal ===
Electoral district	Candidates								Incumbent
Electoral district	BQ	Conservative	Liberal	NDP	Green	Marxist-Leninist	Rhinoceros	Other	Incumbent
Hochelaga	Daniel Paillé; 14,451; 31.20%	Audrey Castonguay; 3,126; 6.75%	Gilbert Thibodeau; 5,064; 10.93%	Marjolaine Boutin-Sweet; 22,314; 48.17%	Yaneisy Delgado Dihigo; 798; 1.72%	Christine Dandenault; 143; 0.31%	Hugo Samson Veillette (Rhino); 246; 0.53%	Marianne Breton Fontaine (Comm.); 180; 0.39%	Daniel Paillé
Honoré-Mercier	Martin Laroche; 8,935; 18.52%	Gérard Labelle; 5,992; 12.42%	Pablo Rodriguez; 14,641; 30.35%	Paulina Ayala; 17,545; 36.37%	Gaëtan Bérard; 770; 1.60%	Jean-Paul Bédard; 170; 0.35%	Valery Chevrefils-Latulippe; 181; 0.38%		Pablo Rodriguez
La Pointe-de-l'Île	Ginette Beaudry; 15,475; 32.48%	Mathieu Drolet; 3,664; 7.69%	Olivier L. Coulombe; 4,369; 9.17%	Ève Péclet; 23,033; 48.34%	David J. Cox; 898; 1.88%	Claude Brunelle; 213; 0.45%			Francine Lalonde†
Laurier—Sainte-Marie	**Gilles Duceppe**; 17,991; 35.90%	Charles K. Langford; 1,764; 3.52%	Philippe Allard; 4,976; 9.93%	Hélène Laverdière; 23,373; 46.64%	Olivier Adam; 1,324; 2.64%	Serge Lachapelle; 77; 0.15%	**François Yo Gourd**; 398; 0.79%	Sylvain Archambault (Comm.); 137 0.27%	**Gilles Duceppe**
Laurier—Sainte-Marie	**Gilles Duceppe**; 17,991; 35.90%	Charles K. Langford; 1,764; 3.52%	Philippe Allard; 4,976; 9.93%	Hélène Laverdière; 23,373; 46.64%	Olivier Adam; 1,324; 2.64%	Serge Lachapelle; 77; 0.15%	**François Yo Gourd**; 398; 0.79%	Dimitri Mourkes (Ind.); 73 0.15%	**Gilles Duceppe**
Rosemont—La Petite-Patrie	Bernard Bigras; 17,702; 32.85%	Sébastien Forté; 2,328; 4.32%	Kettly Beauregard; 4,920; 9.13%	Alexandre Boulerice; 27,484; 51.00%	Sameer Muldeen; 899; 1.67%	Stéphane Chénier; 140; 0.26%	Jean-Patrick Berthiaume 417; 0.77%		Bernard Bigras

=== Western Montreal ===
Electoral district	Candidates							Incumbent
Electoral district	BQ	Conservative	Liberal	NDP	Green	Marxist-Leninist	Other	Incumbent
Jeanne-Le Ber	Thierry St-Cyr; 12,635; 24.22%	Pierre Lafontaine; 4,678; 8.97%	Mark Bruneau; 10,054; 19.28%	Tyrone Benskin; 23,293; 44.66%	Richard Noël; 1,377; 2.64%	Eileen Studd; 121; 0.23%		Thierry St-Cyr
Lac-Saint-Louis	Éric Taillefer; 1,689; 3.12%	Larry Smith; 15,394; 28.45%	Francis Scarpaleggia; 18,457; 34.11%	Alain Ackad; 16,253; 30.04%	Bruno Tremblay; 2,315; 4.28%			Francis Scarpaleggia
LaSalle—Émard	Carl Dubois; 6,151; 14.66%	Chang-Tao Jimmy Yu; 5,516; 13.14%	Lise Zarac; 11,172; 26.62%	Hélène LeBlanc; 17,691; 42.15%	Lorraine Banville; 946; 2.25%	Yves Le Seigle; 288; 0.69%	Guillaume Berger-Richard (Rhino); 208; 0.50%	Lise Zarac
Mount Royal	Gabriel Dumais; 1,136; 2.91%	Saulie Zajdel; 13,891; 35.61%	Irwin Cotler; 16,151; 41.41%	Jeff Itcush; 6,963; 17.85%	Brian Sarwer-Foner; 683; 1.75%	Diane Johnston; 109; 0.28%	Abraham Weizfeld (NA); 74; 0.19%	Irwin Cotler
Notre-Dame-de-Grâce—Lachine	Gabrielle Ladouceur-Despins; 3,983; 8.82%	Matthew Conway; 6,574; 14.56%	Marlene Jennings; 14,407; 31.90%	Isabelle Morin; 17,943; 39.73%	Jessica Gal; 1,914; 4.24%	Rachel Hoffman; 131; 0.29%	David Andrew Lovett (Ind.); 207; 0.46%	Marlene Jennings
Outremont	Élise Daoust; 3,199; 8.23%	Rodolphe Husny; 3,408; 8.77%	Martin Cauchon; 9,204; 23.69%	Thomas Mulcair; 21,906; 56.37%	Francois Pilon; 838; 2.16%		Johan Boyden (Comm.); 143 0.37%	Thomas Mulcair
Outremont	Élise Daoust; 3,199; 8.23%	Rodolphe Husny; 3,408; 8.77%	Martin Cauchon; 9,204; 23.69%	Thomas Mulcair; 21,906; 56.37%	Francois Pilon; 838; 2.16%		Tommy Gaudet (Rhino); 160 0.41%	Thomas Mulcair
Pierrefonds—Dollard	Nicolas Jolicoeur; 2,392; 4.98%	Agop Evereklian; 12,901; 26.86%	Bernard Patry; 14,632; 30.47%	Lysane Blanchette-Lamothe 16,390; 34.13%	Jonathan Lumer; 1,710; 3.56%			Bernard Patry
Saint-Laurent—Cartierville	William Fayad; 2,981; 7.30%	Svetlana Litvin; 7,124; 17.46%	Stéphane Dion; 17,726; 43.43%	Maria Ximena Florez; 11,948; 29.28%	Tim Landry; 857; 2.10%	Fernand Deschamps; 176; 0.43%		Stéphane Dion
Westmount—Ville-Marie	Véronique Roy; 2,278; 5.52%	Neil Drabkin; 7,218; 17.49%	Marc Garneau; 15,346; 37.18%	Joanne Corbeil; 14,704; 35.62%	Andrew Carkner; 1,516; 3.67%		Victoria Haliburton (Rhino); 140 0.34%	Marc Garneau
Westmount—Ville-Marie	Véronique Roy; 2,278; 5.52%	Neil Drabkin; 7,218; 17.49%	Marc Garneau; 15,346; 37.18%	Joanne Corbeil; 14,704; 35.62%	Andrew Carkner; 1,516; 3.67%		Bill Sloan (Comm.); 73 0.18%	Marc Garneau

=== Northern Montreal and Laval ===
Electoral district	Candidates							Incumbent
Electoral district	BQ	Conservative	Liberal	NDP	Green	Marxist-Leninist	Other	Incumbent
Ahuntsic	Maria Mourani; 14,908; 31.80%	Constantin Kiryakidis; 3,770; 8.04%	Noushig Eloyan; 13,087; 27.91%	Chantal Reeves; 14,200; 30.29%	Ted Kouretas; 620; 1.32%		Jean-Olivier Berthiaume (Rhino); 299; 0.64%	Maria Mourani
Bourassa	Daniel Mailhot; 6,105; 16.06%	David Azoulay; 3,354; 8.82%	Denis Coderre; 15,550; 40.91%	Julie Demers; 12,270; 32.28%	Tiziana Centazzo; 613; 1.61%	Geneviève Royer; 121; 0.32%		Denis Coderre
Papineau	Vivian Barbot; 11,091; 25.93%	Shama Chopra; 2,021; 4.73%	Justin Trudeau; 16,429; 38.41%	Marcos Radhames Tejada; 12,102; 28.29%	Danny Polifroni; 806; 1.88%	Peter Macrisopoulos; 228; 0.53%	Joseph Young (NA); 95; 0.22%	Justin Trudeau
Saint-Léonard—Saint-Michel	Alain Bernier; 3,396; 9.36%	Riccardo De Ioris; 4,991; 13.76%	Massimo Pacetti; 15,340; 42.30%	Roberta Peressini; 11,720; 32.32%	Michael Di Pardo; 657; 1.81%	Garnet Colly; 162; 0.45%		Massimo Pacetti

=== Laurentides, Outaouais and Northern Quebec ===
Electoral district	Candidates						Incumbent
Electoral district	BQ	Conservative	Liberal	NDP	Green	Other	Incumbent
Abitibi—Baie-James— Nunavik—Eeyou	Yvon Lévesque; 5,615; 18.02%	Jean-Maurice Matte; 7,089; 22.74%	Léandre Gervais; 3,282; 10.53%	Romeo Saganash; 13,961; 44.79%	Johnny Kasudluak; 1,221; 3.92%		Yvon Lévesque
Abitibi—Témiscamingue	Marc Lemay; 15,258; 31.56%	Steven Hébert; 4,777; 9.88%	Suzie Grenon; 2,859; 5.91%	Christine Moore; 24,763; 51.22%	Patrick Rochon; 694; 1.44%		Marc Lemay
Argenteuil—Papineau— Mirabel	Mario Laframboise; 16,880; 28.96%	Yvan Patry; 6,497; 11.15%	Daniel Fox; 7,135; 12.24%	Mylène Freeman; 25,802; 44.27%	Stephen Matthews; 1,506; 2.58%	Christian-Simon Ferlatte (M-L); 117 0.20%	Mario Laframboise
Argenteuil—Papineau— Mirabel	Mario Laframboise; 16,880; 28.96%	Yvan Patry; 6,497; 11.15%	Daniel Fox; 7,135; 12.24%	Mylène Freeman; 25,802; 44.27%	Stephen Matthews; 1,506; 2.58%	Michel Daniel Guibord (Ind.); 342 0.59%	Mario Laframboise
Gatineau	Richard Nadeau; 8,619; 15.11%	Jennifer Gearey; 4,532; 7.95%	Steve MacKinnon; 7,975; 13.98%	Françoise Boivin; 35,262; 61.83%	Jonathan Meijer; 639; 1.12%		Richard Nadeau
Hull—Aylmer	Dino Lemay; 5,019; 8.44%	Nancy Brassard-Fortin; 6,058; 10.19%	Marcel Proulx; 12,051; 20.27%	Nycole Turmel; 35,194; 59.20%	Roger Fleury; 1,125; 1.89%		Marcel Proulx
Laurentides—Labelle	Johanne Deschamps; 17,799; 31.45%	Guy Joncas; 5,246; 9.27%	Jean-Marc Lacoste; 7,169; 12.67%	Marc-André Morin; 24,800; 43.83%	François Beauchamp; 1,423; 2.51%	Mikaël St-Louis (M-L); 149 0.26%	Johanne Deschamps
Pontiac	Maude Tremblay; 4,917; 10.05%	Lawrence Cannon; 14,441; 29.50%	Cindy Duncan McMillan; 6,242; 12.75%	Mathieu Ravignat; 22,376; 45.71%	Louis-Philippe Mayrand; 849; 1.73%	Benoit Legros (M-L); 124 0.25%	Lawrence Cannon
Rivière-des-Mille-Îles	Luc Desnoyers; 14,873; 28.55%	Lucie Leblanc; 5,057; 9.71%	Denis Joannette; 5,300; 10.17%	Laurin Liu; 25,639; 49.21%	Gilles Bisson; 1,229; 2.36%		Luc Desnoyers
Rivière-du-Nord	Monique Guay; 15,105; 28.21%	Sylvain Charron; 4,469; 8.35%	Jonathan Juteau; 3,400; 6.35%	Pierre Dionne Labelle; 29,603; 55.28%	René Piché; 972; 1.82%		Monique Guay
Terrebonne—Blainville	Diane Bourgeois; 17,663; 30.84%	Jean-Philippe Payment; 5,236; 9.14%	Robert Frégeau; 4,893; 8.54%	Charmaine Borg; 28,260; 49.34%	Michel Paulette; 1,219; 2.13%		Diane Bourgeois

== Ontario ==
=== Ottawa ===
Electoral district	Candidates					Incumbent
Electoral district	Conservative	Liberal	NDP	Green	Other	Incumbent
Carleton—Mississippi Mills	Gordon O'Connor; 43,723; 56.95%	Karen McCrimmon; 18,393; 23.96%	Erin Peters; 11,223; 14.62%	John Hogg; 3,434; 4.47%		Gordon O'Connor
Nepean—Carleton	Pierre Poilievre; 43,477; 54.45%	Ryan Keon; 20,146; 25.23%	Ric Dagenais; 12,962; 16.23%	Jean-Luc Cooke; 3,260; 4.08%		Pierre Poilievre
Ottawa Centre	Damian Konstantinakos; 14,063; 21.68%	Scott Bradley; 13,049; 20.12%	Paul Dewar; 33,805; 52.11%	Jen Hunter; 3,262; 5.03%	John Andrew Akpata (Mar.); 326 0.50%	Paul Dewar
Ottawa Centre	Damian Konstantinakos; 14,063; 21.68%	Scott Bradley; 13,049; 20.12%	Paul Dewar; 33,805; 52.11%	Jen Hunter; 3,262; 5.03%	Romeo Bellai (Ind.); 210 0.32%	Paul Dewar
Ottawa Centre	Damian Konstantinakos; 14,063; 21.68%	Scott Bradley; 13,049; 20.12%	Paul Dewar; 33,805; 52.11%	Jen Hunter; 3,262; 5.03%	Stuart Ryan (Comm.); 109 0.17%	Paul Dewar
Ottawa Centre	Damian Konstantinakos; 14,063; 21.68%	Scott Bradley; 13,049; 20.12%	Paul Dewar; 33,805; 52.11%	Jen Hunter; 3,262; 5.03%	Pierre Soublière (M-L); 44 0.07%	Paul Dewar
Ottawa—Orléans	Royal Galipeau; 28,584; 44.55%	David Bertschi; 24,649; 38.42%	Martine Cénatus; 9,086; 14.16%	Paul Maillet; 1,839; 2.87%		Royal Galipeau
Ottawa South	Elie Salibi; 19,634; 33.28%	David McGuinty; 25,963; 44.01%	James McLaren; 10,712; 18.16%	Mick Kitor; 1,787; 3.03%	Mike Bleskie (Pirate); 382 0.65%	David McGuinty
Ottawa South	Elie Salibi; 19,634; 33.28%	David McGuinty; 25,963; 44.01%	James McLaren; 10,712; 18.16%	Mick Kitor; 1,787; 3.03%	Al Gullon (PC); 513 0.87%	David McGuinty
Ottawa—Vanier	Rem Westland; 14,184; 27.06%	Mauril Bélanger; 20,009; 38.17%	Trevor Haché; 15,391; 29.36%	Caroline Rioux; 2,716; 5.18%	Christian Legeais (M-L); 122; 0.23%	Mauril Bélanger
Ottawa West—Nepean	John Baird; 25,226; 44.71%	Anita Vandenbeld; 17,790; 31.53%	Marlene Rivier; 11,128; 19.72%	Mark MacKenzie; 2,279; 4.04%		John Baird

=== Eastern Ontario ===
Electoral district	Candidates					Incumbent
Electoral district	Conservative	Liberal	NDP	Green	Other	Incumbent
Glengarry—Prescott— Russell	Pierre Lemieux; 28,174; 48.80%	Julie Bourgeois; 17,705; 30.67%	Denis A. Séguin; 9,608; 16.64%	Sylvie Lemieux; 2,049; 3.55%	Jean-Serge Brisson (Libert.); 194; 0.34%	Pierre Lemieux
Kingston and the Islands	Alicia Gordon; 21,189; 34.93%	Ted Hsu; 23,842; 39.31%	Daniel Beals; 13,065; 21.54%	Eric Walton; 2,561; 4.22%		Peter Milliken†
Lanark—Frontenac— Lennox and Addington	Scott Reid; 33,754; 57.27%	David Remington; 9,940; 16.86%	Doug Smyth; 12,174; 20.65%	John Baranyi; 2,702; 4.58%	Ralph Lee (Ind.); 370; 0.63%	Scott Reid
Leeds—Grenville	Gord Brown; 29,991; 60.81%	Marjory Loveys; 7,839; 15.89%	Matthew Gabriel; 9,033; 18.31%	Mary Slade; 2,460; 4.99%		Gord Brown
Prince Edward—Hastings	Daryl Kramp; 29,062; 53.25%	Peter Tinsley; 10,230; 18.75%	Michael McMahon; 12,940; 23.71%	Patrick Larkin; 1,887; 3.46%	Tim Hickey (Ind.); 283 0.52%	Daryl Kramp
Prince Edward—Hastings	Daryl Kramp; 29,062; 53.25%	Peter Tinsley; 10,230; 18.75%	Michael McMahon; 12,940; 23.71%	Patrick Larkin; 1,887; 3.46%	Andrew Skinner (PC); 171 0.31%	Daryl Kramp
Renfrew—Nipissing— Pembroke	Cheryl Gallant; 27,462; 53.43%	Christine Tabbert; 6,545; 12.73%	Eric Burton; 6,903; 13.43%	Rosanne Van Schie; 877; 1.71%	Hec Clouthier (Ind.); 9,611; 18.70%	Cheryl Gallant
Stormont—Dundas— South Glengarry	Guy Lauzon; 29,538; 62.12%	Bernadette Clement; 8,510; 17.90%	Mario Leclerc; 8,313; 17.48%	Wyatt Joseph Walsh; 1,038; 2.18%	Darcy Neal Donnelly (Libert.); 151; 0.32%	Guy Lauzon

=== Central Ontario ===
Electoral district	Candidates					Incumbent
Electoral district	Conservative	Liberal	NDP	Green	Other	Incumbent
Barrie	Patrick Brown; 32,121; 56.70%	Colin Wilson; 9,113; 16.09%	Myrna Clark; 11,842; 20.90%	Erich Jacoby-Hawkins; 3,266; 5.77%	Christine Nugent (M-L); 82 0.14%	Patrick Brown
Barrie	Patrick Brown; 32,121; 56.70%	Colin Wilson; 9,113; 16.09%	Myrna Clark; 11,842; 20.90%	Erich Jacoby-Hawkins; 3,266; 5.77%	Darren Roskam (Libert.); 150 0.26%	Patrick Brown
Barrie	Patrick Brown; 32,121; 56.70%	Colin Wilson; 9,113; 16.09%	Myrna Clark; 11,842; 20.90%	Erich Jacoby-Hawkins; 3,266; 5.77%	Jeff Sakula (CAP); 77 0.14%	Patrick Brown
Bruce—Grey—Owen Sound	Larry Miller; 28,744; 56.30%	Kimberley Love; 8,203; 16.07%	Karen Gventer; 9,008; 17.64%	Emma Hogbin; 5,099; 9.99%		Larry Miller
Dufferin—Caledon	David Tilson; 28,647; 59.01%	Bill Prout; 6,361; 13.10%	Leslie Parsons; 6,409; 13.20%	Ard Van Leeuwen; 7,132; 14.69%		David Tilson
Durham	Bev Oda; 31,737; 54.55%	Grant Humes; 10,387; 17.85%	Tammy Schoep; 12,277; 21.10%	Stephen Leahy; 3,134; 5.39%	Blaize Barnicoat (Libert.); 187 0.32%	Bev Oda
Durham	Bev Oda; 31,737; 54.55%	Grant Humes; 10,387; 17.85%	Tammy Schoep; 12,277; 21.10%	Stephen Leahy; 3,134; 5.39%	Andrew Moriarity (CHP); 462 0.79%	Bev Oda
Haliburton— Kawartha Lakes—Brock	Barry Devolin; 35,192; 60.03%	Laura Redman; 7,539; 12.86%	Lyn Edwards; 12,934; 22.06%	Susanne Lauten; 2,963; 5.05%		Barry Devolin
Newmarket—Aurora	Lois Brown; 31,600; 54.29%	Kyle Peterson; 13,908; 23.90%	Kassandra Bidarian; 8,886; 15.27%	Vanessa Long; 2,628; 4.52%	Dorian Baxter (PC); 998 1.71%	Lois Brown
Newmarket—Aurora	Lois Brown; 31,600; 54.29%	Kyle Peterson; 13,908; 23.90%	Kassandra Bidarian; 8,886; 15.27%	Vanessa Long; 2,628; 4.52%	Yvonne Mackie (AAEVP); 182 0.31%	Lois Brown
Northumberland— Quinte West	Rick Norlock; 32,853; 53.83%	Kim Rudd; 12,822; 21.01%	Russ Christianson; 12,626; 20.69%	Ralph Torrie; 2,733; 4.48%		Rick Norlock
Peterborough	Dean Del Mastro; 29,393; 49.67%	Betsy McGregor; 12,664; 21.40%	Dave Nickle; 14,723; 24.88%	Michael Bell; 2,105; 3.56%	Michael Bates (CAP); 104 0.18%	Dean Del Mastro
Peterborough	Dean Del Mastro; 29,393; 49.67%	Betsy McGregor; 12,664; 21.40%	Dave Nickle; 14,723; 24.88%	Michael Bell; 2,105; 3.56%	Gordon Scott (Ind.); 189 0.32%	Dean Del Mastro
Simcoe—Grey	Kellie Leitch; 31,784; 49.37%	Alex Smardenka; 8,207; 12.75%	Katy Austin; 11,185; 17.38%	Jace Metheral; 3,482; 5.41%	Gord Cochrane (CAP); 244 0.38%	Helena Guergis
Simcoe—Grey	Kellie Leitch; 31,784; 49.37%	Alex Smardenka; 8,207; 12.75%	Katy Austin; 11,185; 17.38%	Jace Metheral; 3,482; 5.41%	Helena Guergis (Ind.); 8,714 13.54%	Helena Guergis
Simcoe—Grey	Kellie Leitch; 31,784; 49.37%	Alex Smardenka; 8,207; 12.75%	Katy Austin; 11,185; 17.38%	Jace Metheral; 3,482; 5.41%	Peter Vander Zaag (CHP); 757 1.18%	Helena Guergis
Simcoe North	Bruce Stanton; 31,581; 54.45%	Steve Clarke; 11,090; 19.12%	Richard Banigan; 11,515; 19.85%	Valerie Powell; 3,489; 6.02%	Adrian Kooger (CHP); 322; 0.56%	Bruce Stanton
York—Simcoe	Peter Van Loan; 33,614; 63.58%	Cynthia Wesley-Esquimaux; 5,702; 10.79%	Sylvia Gerl; 10,190; 19.28%	John Dewar; 2,851; 5.39%	Vicki Gunn (CHP); 352 0.67%	Peter Van Loan
York—Simcoe	Peter Van Loan; 33,614; 63.58%	Cynthia Wesley-Esquimaux; 5,702; 10.79%	Sylvia Gerl; 10,190; 19.28%	John Dewar; 2,851; 5.39%	Paul Pisani (United); 157 0.30%	Peter Van Loan

=== Southern Durham and York ===
Electoral district	Candidates					Incumbent
Electoral district	Conservative	Liberal	NDP	Green	Other	Incumbent
Ajax—Pickering	Chris Alexander; 24,797; 44.07%	Mark Holland; 21,569; 38.33%	Jim Koppens; 8,270; 14.70%	Mike Harilaid; 1,561; 2.77%	Bob Kesic (United); 71; 0.13%	Mark Holland
Markham—Unionville	Bob Saroya; 17,734; 35.55%	John McCallum; 19,429; 38.95%	Nadine Marie Hawkins; 10,897; 21.84%	Adam Poon; 1,597; 3.20%	Allen Small (Libert.); 231; 0.46%	John McCallum
Oak Ridges—Markham	Paul Calandra; 46,241; 51.12%	Lui Temelkovski; 25,561; 28.26%	Janice Hagan; 15,229; 16.84%	Trifon Haitas; 2,349; 2.60%	John Siciliano (PC); 1,080; 1.19%	Paul Calandra
Oshawa	Colin Carrie; 26,034; 51.31%	James Cooper Morton; 3,536; 6.97%	Chris Buckley; 19,212; 37.87%	Gail Bates; 1,631; 3.21%	Matthew Belanger (Libert.); 260 0.51%	Colin Carrie
Oshawa	Colin Carrie; 26,034; 51.31%	James Cooper Morton; 3,536; 6.97%	Chris Buckley; 19,212; 37.87%	Gail Bates; 1,631; 3.21%	David Gershuny (M-L); 61 0.12%	Colin Carrie
Pickering— Scarborough East	Corneliu Chisu; 19,220; 40.11%	Dan McTeague; 18,013; 37.59%	Andrea Moffat; 8,932; 18.64%	Kevin Smith; 1,751; 3.65%		Dan McTeague
Richmond Hill	Costas Menegakis; 22,078; 44.14%	Bryon Wilfert; 17,671; 35.33%	Adam DeVita; 8,433; 16.86%	Cameron W. Hastings; 1,832; 3.66%		Bryon Wilfert
Thornhill	Peter Kent; 36,629; 61.38%	Karen Mock; 14,125; 23.67%	Simon Strelchik; 7,141; 11.97%	Norbert Koehl; 1,562; 2.62%	**Liz White** (AAEVP); 215 0.36%	Peter Kent
Vaughan	Julian Fantino; 38,533; 56.32%	Mario Ferri; 20,435; 29.87%	Mark Pratt; 7,940; 11.60%	Claudia Rodriguez-Larrain; 1,515; 2.21%		Julian Fantino
Whitby—Oshawa	Jim Flaherty; 37,525; 58.42%	Trevor Bardens; 9,066; 14.11%	Trish McAuliffe; 14,305; 22.27%	Rebecca Harrison; 3,143; 4.89%	Josh Insang (Libert.); 198 0.31%	Jim Flaherty

=== Suburban Toronto ===
Electoral district	Candidates					Incumbent
Electoral district	Conservative	Liberal	NDP	Green	Other	Incumbent
Don Valley East	Joe Daniel; 14,422; 36.78%	Yasmin Ratansi; 13,552; 34.56%	Mary Trapani Hynes; 9,878; 25.19%	Akil Sadikali; 1,114; 2.84%	Ryan Kidd (CHP); 246; 0.63%	Yasmin Ratansi
Etobicoke Centre	Ted Opitz; 21,644; 41.21%	Borys Wrzesnewskyj; 21,618; 41.16%	Ana Maria Rivero; 7,735; 14.73%	Katarina Zoricic; 1,377; 2.62%	Sarah Thompson (M-L); 149; 0.28%	Borys Wrzesnewskyj
Etobicoke—Lakeshore	Bernard Trottier; 21,997; 40.35%	**Michael Ignatieff**; 19,128; 35.08%	Michael Erickson; 11,046; 20.26%	Dave Corail; 2,159; 3.96%	Janice Murray (M-L); 190; 0.35%	**Michael Ignatieff**
Etobicoke North	Priti Lamba; 10,357; 32.13%	Kirsty Duncan; 13,665; 42.39%	Diana Andrews; 7,630; 23.67%		**Anna Di Carlo** (M-L); 186 0.58%	Kirsty Duncan
Etobicoke North	Priti Lamba; 10,357; 32.13%	Kirsty Duncan; 13,665; 42.39%	Diana Andrews; 7,630; 23.67%		Alex Dvornyak (Libert.); 208 0.65	Kirsty Duncan
Etobicoke North	Priti Lamba; 10,357; 32.13%	Kirsty Duncan; 13,665; 42.39%	Diana Andrews; 7,630; 23.67%		John C. Gardner (CHP); 189 0.59%	Kirsty Duncan
Scarborough—Agincourt	Harry Tsai; 13,930; 34.18%	Jim Karygiannis; 18,498; 45.39%	Nancy Patchell; 7,736; 18.10%	Pauline Thompson; 946; 2.32%		Jim Karygiannis
Scarborough Centre	Roxanne James; 13,498; 35.55%	John Cannis; 12,028; 31.68%	Natalie Hundt; 11,443; 30.14%	Ella Ng; 998; 2.63%		John Cannis
Scarborough-Guildwood	Chuck Konkel; 13,158; 34.39%	John McKay; 13,849; 36.20%	Danielle Ouellette; 10,145; 26.52%	Alonzo Bartley; 848; 2.22%	Paul Coulbeck (Ind.); 259; 0.68%	John McKay
Scarborough—Rouge River	Marlene Gallyot; 13,935; 29.90%	Rana Sarkar; 12,699; 27.25%	Rathika Sitsabaiesan; 18,935; 40.62%	George B. Singh; 684; 1.47%	Mark Balack (Ind.); 357; 0.77%	Derek Lee†
Scarborough Southwest	Gavan Paranchothy; 12,830; 31.85%	Michelle Simson; 11,699; 29.04%	Dan Harris; 14,119; 35.05%	Stefan Dixon; 1,635; 4.06%		Michelle Simson
Willowdale	Chungsen Leung; 22,207; 41.70%	Martha Hall Findlay; 21,275; 39.95%	Mehdi Mollahasani; 9,777; 18.36%			Martha Hall Findlay
York Centre	Mark Adler; 20,356; 48.50%	Ken Dryden; 13,979; 33.31%	Nick Brownlee; 6,656; 15.86%	Rosemary Frei; 979; 2.33%		Ken Dryden
York West	Audrey Walters; 6,122; 22.08%	Judy Sgro; 13,030; 47.00%	Giulio Manfrini; 7,721; 27.85%	Unblind Kheper Keseb Efekh Tibbin; 450; 1.62%	George Okoth Otura (CHP); 231 0.83%	Judy Sgro
York West	Audrey Walters; 6,122; 22.08%	Judy Sgro; 13,030; 47.00%	Giulio Manfrini; 7,721; 27.85%	Unblind Kheper Keseb Efekh Tibbin; 450; 1.62%	Arthur Smitherman (CAP); 170 0.61%	Judy Sgro

=== Central Toronto ===
Electoral district	Candidates					Incumbent
Electoral district	Conservative	Liberal	NDP	Green	Other	Incumbent
Beaches—East York	Bill Burrows; 11,067; 22.74%	Maria Minna; 14,967; 30.75%	Matthew Kellway; 20,265; 41.64%	Aaron Cameron; 2,240; 4.60%	Roger Carter (M-L); 130; 0.27%	Maria Minna
Davenport	Theresa Rodrigues; 5,573; 14.20%	Mario Silva; 10,946; 27.89%	Andrew Cash; 21,096; 53.74%	Wayne Scott; 1,344; 3.42%	**Miguel Figueroa** (Comm.); 167 0.43%	Mario Silva
Davenport	Theresa Rodrigues; 5,573; 14.20%	Mario Silva; 10,946; 27.89%	Andrew Cash; 21,096; 53.74%	Wayne Scott; 1,344; 3.42%	Simon Luisi (AAEVP); 128 0.33%	Mario Silva
Don Valley West	John Carmichael; 22,962; 42.93%	Rob Oliphant; 22,351; 41.79%	Nicole Yovanoff; 6,280; 11.74%	Georgina Wilcock; 1,703; 3.18%	Dimitris Kabitsis (Comm.); 186; 0.35%	Rob Oliphant
Eglinton—Lawrence	Joe Oliver; 22,652; 46.81%	Joe Volpe; 18,590; 38.42%	Justin Chatwin; 5,613; 11.60%	Paul William Baker; 1,534; 3.17%		Joe Volpe
Parkdale—High Park	Taylor Train; 7,924; 15.55%	Gerard Kennedy; 16,757; 32.89%	Peggy Nash; 24,046; 47.20%	Sarah Newton; 1,666; 3.27%	Andrew Borkowski (CHP); 251 0.49%	Gerard Kennedy
Parkdale—High Park	Taylor Train; 7,924; 15.55%	Gerard Kennedy; 16,757; 32.89%	Peggy Nash; 24,046; 47.20%	Sarah Newton; 1,666; 3.27%	Lorne Gershuny (M-L); 86 0.17%	Gerard Kennedy
Parkdale—High Park	Taylor Train; 7,924; 15.55%	Gerard Kennedy; 16,757; 32.89%	Peggy Nash; 24,046; 47.20%	Sarah Newton; 1,666; 3.27%	Terry Parker (Mar.); 215 0.42%	Gerard Kennedy
St. Paul's	Maureen Harquail; 17,864; 32.37%	Carolyn Bennett; 22,409; 40.60%	William Molls; 12,124; 21.97%	Jim McGarva; 2,495; 4.52%	John Kittredge (Libert.); 303; 0.55%	Carolyn Bennett
Toronto Centre	Kevin Moore; 12,604; 22.64%	Bob Rae; 22,832; 41.01%	Susan Wallace; 16,818; 30.21%	Ellen Michelson; 2,796; 5.02%	Judi Falardeau (Libert.); 277 0.50%	Bob Rae
Toronto Centre	Kevin Moore; 12,604; 22.64%	Bob Rae; 22,832; 41.01%	Susan Wallace; 16,818; 30.21%	Ellen Michelson; 2,796; 5.02%	Philip Fernandez (M-L); 76 0.14%	Bob Rae
Toronto Centre	Kevin Moore; 12,604; 22.64%	Bob Rae; 22,832; 41.01%	Susan Wallace; 16,818; 30.21%	Ellen Michelson; 2,796; 5.02%	Catherine Holliday (Comm.); 159 0.29%	Bob Rae
Toronto Centre	Kevin Moore; 12,604; 22.64%	Bob Rae; 22,832; 41.01%	Susan Wallace; 16,818; 30.21%	Ellen Michelson; 2,796; 5.02%	Bahman Yazdanfar (Ind.); 108 0.19%	Bob Rae
Toronto—Danforth	Katarina von Koenig; 6,885; 14.32%	Andrew Lang; 8,472; 17.62%	**Jack Layton**; 29,235; 60.80%	Adriana Mugnatto-Hamu; 3,107; 6.46%	Marie Crawford (AAEVP); 387; 0.80%	**Jack Layton**
Trinity—Spadina	Gin Siow; 10,976; 16.81%	Christine Innes; 15,276; 23.39%	Olivia Chow; 35,601; 54.51%	Rachel Barney; 2,861; 4.38%	Chester Brown (Libert.); 456 0.70%	Olivia Chow
Trinity—Spadina	Gin Siow; 10,976; 16.81%	Christine Innes; 15,276; 23.39%	Olivia Chow; 35,601; 54.51%	Rachel Barney; 2,861; 4.38%	Nick Lin (M-L); 140 0.21%	Olivia Chow
York South—Weston	Jilian Saweczko; 8,559; 24.32%	Alan Tonks; 11,542; 32.79%	Mike Sullivan; 14,122; 40.12%	Sonny Day; 975; 2.77%		Alan Tonks

=== Brampton, Mississauga and Oakville ===
Electoral district	Candidates					Incumbent
Electoral district	Conservative	Liberal	NDP	Green	Other	Incumbent
Bramalea—Gore—Malton	Bal Gosal; 19,907; 34.44%	Gurbax S. Malhi; 16,402; 28.38%	Jagmeet Singh; 19,368; 33.51%	John R.A. Moulton; 1,748; 3.02%	Frank Chilelli (M-L); 371; 0.64%	Gurbax Malhi
Brampton—Springdale	Parm Gill; 24,618; 48.26%	Ruby Dhalla; 14,221; 27.88%	Manijit Grewal; 10,022; 19.65%	Mark Hoffberg; 1,926; 3.78%	Elizabeth Rowley (Comm.); 219; 0.43%	Ruby Dhalla
Brampton West	Kyle Seeback; 28,320; 44.75%	Andrew Kania; 22,128; 34.97%	Jagtar Shergill; 11,225; 17.74%	Avtaar Soor; 1,224; 1.93%	Theodore Koum Njoh (Ind.); 387; 0.61%	Andrew Kania
Mississauga— Brampton South	Eve Adams; 23,632; 44.72%	Navdeep Bains; 18,579; 35.16%	Jim Glavan; 9,465; 17.91%	Benjamin Jonathon Ullysses Stone; 1,044; 1.98%	Tim Sullivan (M-L); 127; 0.24%	Navdeep Bains
Mississauga East—Cooksville	Wladyslaw Lizon; 18,796; 39.97%	Peter Fonseca; 18,120; 38.53%	Waseem Ahmed; 8,836; 18.79%	Jaymini Bhikha; 1,032; 2.19%	Pierre Chénier (M-L); 241; 0.51%	Albina Guarnieri†
Mississauga—Erindale	Robert Dechert; 29,793; 46.95%	Omar Alghabra; 21,541; 33.95%	Michelle Bilek; 10,327; 16.27%	John Fraser; 1,694; 2.67%	Dagmar Sullivan (M-L); 99; 0.16%	Bob Dechert
Mississauga South	Stella Ambler; 22,991; 46.48%	Paul Szabo; 18,393; 37.18%	Farah Kalbouneh; 6,354; 12.85%	Paul Simas; 1,532; 3.10%	Richard Barrett (Ind.); 194; 0.39%	Paul Szabo
Mississauga—Streetsville	Brad Butt; 22,104; 43.86%	Bonnie Crombie; 18,651; 37.01%	Aijaz Naqvi; 7,834; 15.55%	Chris Hill; 1,802; 3.58%		Bonnie Crombie
Oakville	Terence Young; 30,068; 51.65%	Max Khan; 17,890; 30.73%	James Ede; 8,117; 13.94%	Andrew Chlobowski; 2,140; 3.68%		Terence Young

=== Hamilton, Burlington and Niagara ===
Electoral district	Candidates						Incumbent
Electoral district	Conservative	Liberal	NDP	Green	Christian Heritage	Other	Incumbent
Ancaster—Dundas— Flamborough—Westdale	David Sweet; 30,240; 51.25%	Dave Braden; 14,594; 24.74%	Nancy MacBain; 10,956; 18.57%	Peter Michael Ormond; 2,963; 5.02%		Jamilé Ghaddar (M-L); 77 0.13	David Sweet
Ancaster—Dundas— Flamborough—Westdale	David Sweet; 30,240; 51.25%	Dave Braden; 14,594; 24.74%	Nancy MacBain; 10,956; 18.57%	Peter Michael Ormond; 2,963; 5.02%		Anthony Giles (Libert.); 170 0.29	David Sweet
Burlington	Mike Wallace; 32,958; 54.16%	Alyssa Brierley; 14,154; 23.26%	David Laird; 11,449; 18.81%	Graham Reid Mayberry; 2,151; 3.53%		Elaine Baetz (M-L); 140; 0.23%	Mike Wallace
Halton	Lisa Raitt; 44,214; 54.52%	Connie Laurin-Bowie; 20,903; 25.77%	Pat Heroux; 12,960; 15.98%	Judi Remigio; 2,778; 3.43%	Tony Rodrigues; 249; 0.31%		Lisa Raitt
Hamilton Centre	Jim Byron; 11,020; 26.36%	Anne Tennier; 5,912; 14.14%	David Christopherson; 23,849; 57.04%			Michael Baldasaro (Mar.); 780 1.87%	David Christopherson
Hamilton Centre	Jim Byron; 11,020; 26.36%	Anne Tennier; 5,912; 14.14%	David Christopherson; 23,849; 57.04%			Lisa Nussey (M-L); 252 0.60%	David Christopherson
Hamilton East— Stoney Creek	Brad Clark; 17,567; 36.19%	Michelle Stockwell; 6,411; 13.21%	Wayne Marston; 21,931; 45.18%	Dave Hart Dyke; 1,450; 2.99%		Wendell Fields (M-L); 95 0.20%	Wayne Marston
Hamilton East— Stoney Creek	Brad Clark; 17,567; 36.19%	Michelle Stockwell; 6,411; 13.21%	Wayne Marston; 21,931; 45.18%	Dave Hart Dyke; 1,450; 2.99%		Gord Hill (PC); 468 0.96%	Wayne Marston
Hamilton East— Stoney Creek	Brad Clark; 17,567; 36.19%	Michelle Stockwell; 6,411; 13.21%	Wayne Marston; 21,931; 45.18%	Dave Hart Dyke; 1,450; 2.99%		Bob Green Innes (CAP); 92 0.19%	Wayne Marston
Hamilton East— Stoney Creek	Brad Clark; 17,567; 36.19%	Michelle Stockwell; 6,411; 13.21%	Wayne Marston; 21,931; 45.18%	Dave Hart Dyke; 1,450; 2.99%		Bob Mann (Comm.); 138 0.28%	Wayne Marston
Hamilton East— Stoney Creek	Brad Clark; 17,567; 36.19%	Michelle Stockwell; 6,411; 13.21%	Wayne Marston; 21,931; 45.18%	Dave Hart Dyke; 1,450; 2.99%		Greg Pattinson (Libert.); 385 0.79%	Wayne Marston
Hamilton Mountain	Terry Anderson; 17,936; 33.05%	Marie Bountrogianni; 8,787; 16.19%	Chris Charlton; 25,595; 47.17%	Stephen Brotherson; 1,505; 2.77%	Jim Enos; 270; 0.50%	Henryk Adamiec (Ind.); 171; 0.32%	Chris Charlton
Niagara Falls	Rob Nicholson; 28,748; 53.26%	Bev Hodgson; 10,206; 18.91%	Heather Kelley; 12,681; 23.49%	Shawn Willick; 2,086; 3.86%	Harold Jonker; 259; 0.48%		Rob Nicholson
Niagara West—Glanbrook	Dean Allison; 33,701; 57.25%	Stephen Bieda; 8,699; 14.78%	David Heatley; 12,734; 21.63%	Sid Frere; 2,530; 4.30%	Bryan Jongbloed; 1,199; 2.04%		Dean Allison
St. Catharines	Rick Dykstra; 25,571; 50.86%	Andrew Gill; 10,358; 20.60%	Mike Williams; 11,973; 23.82%	Jennifer Mooradian; 1,924; 3.83%	Dave Bylsma; 357; 0.71%	Saleh Waziruddin (Comm.); 91; 0.18%	Rick Dykstra
Welland	Leanna Villella; 20,895; 40.24%	John Maloney; 7,276; 14.01%	Malcolm Allen; 21,917; 42.21%	Robin Williamson; 1,297; 2.50%	David Vangoolen; 299; 0.58%	Ray Game (Ind.); 169 0.33%	Malcolm Allen
Welland	Leanna Villella; 20,895; 40.24%	John Maloney; 7,276; 14.01%	Malcolm Allen; 21,917; 42.21%	Robin Williamson; 1,297; 2.50%	David Vangoolen; 299; 0.58%	Ron Walker (M-L); 71 0.14%	Malcolm Allen

=== Midwestern Ontario ===
Electoral district	Candidates					Incumbent
Electoral district	Conservative	Liberal	NDP	Green	Other	Incumbent
Brant	Phil McColeman; 28,045; 48.90%	Lloyd St. Amand; 10,780; 18.80%	Marc Laferriere; 16,351; 28.51%	Nora Fueten; 1,858; 3.24%	Leslie Bory (Ind.); 174 0.30%	Phil McColeman
Brant	Phil McColeman; 28,045; 48.90%	Lloyd St. Amand; 10,780; 18.80%	Marc Laferriere; 16,351; 28.51%	Nora Fueten; 1,858; 3.24%	Martin Sitko (Ind.); 138 0.24%	Phil McColeman
Cambridge	Gary Goodyear; 29,394; 53.40%	Bryan May; 8,285; 15.05%	Susan Galvao; 15,238; 27.68%	Jacques Malette; 1,978; 3.59%	Manuel Couto (M-L); 153; 0.28%	Gary Goodyear
Guelph	Marty Burke; 19,352; 32.79%	Frank Valeriote; 25,588; 43.35%	Bobbi Stewart; 9,880; 16.74%	John Lawson; 3,619; 6.13%	Phillip Bender (Libert.); 192 0.33%	Frank Valeriote
Guelph	Marty Burke; 19,352; 32.79%	Frank Valeriote; 25,588; 43.35%	Bobbi Stewart; 9,880; 16.74%	John Lawson; 3,619; 6.13%	Drew Garvie (Comm.); 104 0.18%	Frank Valeriote
Guelph	Marty Burke; 19,352; 32.79%	Frank Valeriote; 25,588; 43.35%	Bobbi Stewart; 9,880; 16.74%	John Lawson; 3,619; 6.13%	Kornelis Klevering (Mar.); 170 0.29%	Frank Valeriote
Guelph	Marty Burke; 19,352; 32.79%	Frank Valeriote; 25,588; 43.35%	Bobbi Stewart; 9,880; 16.74%	John Lawson; 3,619; 6.13%	Karen Levenson (AAEVP); 116 0.20%	Frank Valeriote
Haldimand—Norfolk	Diane Finley; 25,655; 50.94%	Bob Speller; 12,549; 24.92%	Ian Nichols; 10,062; 19.98%	Anne Faulkner; 1,665; 3.31%	Steven Elgersma (CHP); 435; 0.86%	Diane Finley
Huron—Bruce	Ben Lobb; 29,255; 54.95%	Charlie Bagnato; 8,784; 16.50%	Grant Robertson; 13,493; 25.34%	Eric Shelley; 1,455; 2.73%	Dennis Valenta (Ind.); 254; 0.48%	Ben Lobb
Kitchener Centre	Stephen Woodworth; 21,119; 42.40%	Karen Redman; 15,592; 31.30%	Peter Thurley; 10,742; 21.57%	Byron Williston; 1,972; 3.96%	Mark Corbiere (M-L); 92 0.18%	Stephen Woodworth
Kitchener Centre	Stephen Woodworth; 21,119; 42.40%	Karen Redman; 15,592; 31.30%	Peter Thurley; 10,742; 21.57%	Byron Williston; 1,972; 3.96%	Alan Rimmer (Ind.); 199 0.40%	Stephen Woodworth
Kitchener Centre	Stephen Woodworth; 21,119; 42.40%	Karen Redman; 15,592; 31.30%	Peter Thurley; 10,742; 21.57%	Byron Williston; 1,972; 3.96%	Martin Suter (Comm.); 93 0.19%	Stephen Woodworth
Kitchener—Conestoga	Harold Albrecht; 28,902; 54.12%	Robert Rosehart; 10,653; 19.95%	Lorne Bruce; 11,655; 21.84%	Albert Ashley; 2,184; 4.09%		Harold Albrecht
Kitchener—Waterloo	Peter Braid; 27,039; 40.85%	Andrew Telegdi; 24,895; 37.62%	Bill Brown; 10,606; 16.03%	Cathy MacLellan; 3,148; 4.77%	Julian Ichim (M-L); 66 0.10%	Peter Braid
Kitchener—Waterloo	Peter Braid; 27,039; 40.85%	Andrew Telegdi; 24,895; 37.62%	Bill Brown; 10,606; 16.03%	Cathy MacLellan; 3,148; 4.77%	Steven Bradley Scott (Pirate); 245 0.37%	Peter Braid
Kitchener—Waterloo	Peter Braid; 27,039; 40.85%	Andrew Telegdi; 24,895; 37.62%	Bill Brown; 10,606; 16.03%	Cathy MacLellan; 3,148; 4.77%	Richard Walsh-Bowers (Ind.); 174 0.26%	Peter Braid
Oxford	Dave MacKenzie; 27,973; 58.90%	Tim Lobzun; 4,521; 9.52%	Paul Arsenault; 12,164; 25.61%	Mike Farlow; 2,058; 4.33%	John Markus (CHP); 776; 1.63%	Dave MacKenzie
Perth Wellington	Gary Schellenberger; 25,281; 54.48%	Bob McTavish; 8,341; 17.98%	Ellen Papenburg; 9,861; 21.25%	John Cowling; 2,112; 4.55%	Irma N DeVries (CHP); 806; 1.74%	Gary Schellenberger
Wellington—Halton Hills	Michael Chong; 35,132; 63.70%	Barry Peters; 9,034; 16.38%	Anastasia Zavarella; 7,146; 12.96%	Brent Bouteiller; 3,527; 6.39%	Jeffrey Streutker (CHP); 316; 0.57%	Michael Chong

=== Southwestern Ontario ===
Electoral district	Candidates					Incumbent
Electoral district	Conservative	Liberal	NDP	Green	Other	Incumbent
Chatham-Kent—Essex	Dave Van Kesteren; 23,360; 53.76%	Matt Daudlin; 7,172; 16.51%	Ron Franko; 11,449; 26.35%	Robert Hodgson; 1,470; 3.38%		Dave Van Kesteren
Elgin—Middlesex—London	Joe Preston; 29,147; 57.55%	Graham Warwick; 6,812; 13.45%	Fred Sinclair; 12,439; 24.56%	John Fisher; 1,529; 3.02%	Will Arlow (CAP); 140 0.28%	Joe Preston
Elgin—Middlesex—London	Joe Preston; 29,147; 57.55%	Graham Warwick; 6,812; 13.45%	Fred Sinclair; 12,439; 24.56%	John Fisher; 1,529; 3.02%	Carl Hiemstra (CHP); 582 1.15%	Joe Preston
Essex	Jeff Watson; 25,327; 48.06%	Nelson Santos; 7,465; 14.17%	Taras Natyshak; 18,538; 35.18%	Cora Carriveau; 1,290; 2.45%	Enver Villamizar (M-L); 77; 0.15%	Jeff Watson
Lambton—Kent—Middlesex	Bev Shipley; 29,546; 57.68%	Gayle Stucke; 7,264; 14.18%	Joe Hill; 12,299; 24.01%	Jim Johnston; 1,701; 3.32%	Mike Janssens (CHP); 413; 0.81%	Bev Shipley
London—Fanshawe	Jim Chahbar; 14,294; 33.54%	Roger Caranci; 4,893; 11.48%	Irene Mathyssen; 21,689; 50.90%	Matthew Peloza; 1,202; 2.82%	G.J. Rancourt (CHP); 535; 1.26%	Irene Mathyssen
London North Centre	Susan Truppe; 19,468; 36.96%	Glen Pearson; 17,803; 33.80%	German Gutierrez; 12,996; 24.67%	Mary Ann Hodge; 2,177; 4.13%	AnnaMaria Valastro (AAEVP); 229; 0.43%	Glen Pearson
London West	Ed Holder; 27,675; 44.49%	Doug Ferguson; 16,652; 26.77%	Peter Ferguson; 16,109; 25.90%	Brad Arthur Corbett; 1,703; 2.74%	Rod Morley (United); 65; 0.10%	Ed Holder
Sarnia—Lambton	Pat Davidson; 26,112; 52.58%	Tim Fugard; 6,931; 13.96%	Brian White; 14,856; 29.91%	Tim van Bodegom; 1,252; 2.52%	Christopher Desomeaux-Malm (CHP); 514; 1.03%	Patricia Davidson
Windsor—Tecumseh	Denise Ghanam; 14,945; 33.55%	Irek Kusmierczyk; 5,764; 12.94%	Joe Comartin; 22,235; 49.92%	Kyle Prestanski; 1,354; 3.04%	Laura Chesnik (M-L); 242; 0.54%	Joe Comartin
Windsor West	Lisa Lumley; 12,577; 31.64%	Melanie Deveau; 4,327; 10.89%	Brian Masse; 21,592; 54.33%	Alishia Fox; 1,096; 2.76%	Margaret Villamzir (M-L); 153; 0.38%	Brian Masse

=== Northern Ontario ===
Electoral district	Candidates					Incumbent
Electoral district	Conservative	Liberal	NDP	Green	Other	Incumbent
Algoma—Manitoulin— Kapuskasing	Ray Sturgeon; 10,991; 30.33%	François Cloutier; 5,374; 14.83%	Carol Hughes; 18,747; 51.73%	Lorraine A. Rekmans; 1,130; 3.12%		Carol Hughes
Kenora	Greg Rickford; 11,567; 47.05%	Roger Valley; 5,381; 21.89%	Tania Cameron; 6,855; 27.88%	Mike Schwindt; 636; 2.59%	Kelvin Chicago-Boucher (Ind.); 147; 0.60%	Greg Rickford
Nickel Belt	Lynne Reynolds; 12,503; 27.98%	Joe Cormier; 6,308; 14.12%	Claude Gravelle; 24,566; 54.97%	Christine Guillot-Proulx; 1,252; 2.80%	Steve Rutchinski (M-L); 59; 0.13%	Claude Gravelle
Nipissing—Timiskaming	Jay Aspin; 15,495; 36.66%	Anthony Rota; 15,477; 36.61%	Rona Eckert; 8,781; 20.77%	Scott Edward Daley; 2,518; 5.96%		Anthony Rota
Parry Sound-Muskoka	Tony Clement; 25,864; 55.73%	Cindy Waters; 5,330; 11.48%	Wendy Wilson; 11,217; 24.17%	Glen Hodgson; 3,776; 8.14%	David Carmichael (Ind.); 168 0.36%	Tony Clement
Parry Sound-Muskoka	Tony Clement; 25,864; 55.73%	Cindy Waters; 5,330; 11.48%	Wendy Wilson; 11,217; 24.17%	Glen Hodgson; 3,776; 8.14%	Albert Gray Smith (M-L); 54 0.12%	Tony Clement
Sault Ste. Marie	Bryan Hayes; 18,328; 41.44%	Christian Provenzano; 8,343; 18.86%	Tony Martin; 16,467; 37.23%	Luke Macmichael; 945; 2.14%	Randy Riauka (CHP); 111 0.25%	Tony Martin
Sault Ste. Marie	Bryan Hayes; 18,328; 41.44%	Christian Provenzano; 8,343; 18.86%	Tony Martin; 16,467; 37.23%	Luke Macmichael; 945; 2.14%	Mike Taffarel (M-L); 38 0.09%	Tony Martin
Sudbury	Fred Slade; 12,881; 28.35%	Carol Hartman; 8,172; 17.98%	Glenn Thibeault; 22,684; 49.92%	Fred Twilley; 1,359; 2.99%	**Will Morin** (FPNP); 229 0.50%	Glenn Thibeault
Sudbury	Fred Slade; 12,881; 28.35%	Carol Hartman; 8,172; 17.98%	Glenn Thibeault; 22,684; 49.92%	Fred Twilley; 1,359; 2.99%	J. David Popescu (Ind.); 116 0.26%	Glenn Thibeault
Thunder Bay—Rainy River	Moe Comuzzi-Stehmann; 10,097; 27.17%	Ken Boshcoff; 8,067; 21.71%	John Rafferty; 18,085; 48.67%	Ed Shields; 909; 2.45%		John Rafferty
Thunder Bay— Superior North	Richard Harvey; 10,894; 29.66%	Yves Fricot; 6,117; 16.66%	Bruce Hyer; 18,334; 49.92%	Scot Kyle; 1,115; 3.04%	Denis A. Carrière (Mar.); 265; 0.72%	Bruce Hyer
Timmins-James Bay	Bill Greenberg; 10,526; 31.69%	Marilyn Wood; 5,230; 15.74%	Charlie Angus; 16,738; 50.39%	Lisa Bennett; 724; 2.18%		Charlie Angus

== Manitoba ==
=== Rural Manitoba ===
Electoral district	Candidates					Incumbent
Electoral district	Conservative	Liberal	NDP	Green	Other	Incumbent
Brandon—Souris	Merv Tweed; 22,386; 63.73%	Wes Penner; 1,882; 5.36%	John Bouché; 8,845; 25.18%	Dave Barnes; 2,012; 5.73%		Merv Tweed
Churchill	Wally Daudrich; 5,256; 26.18%	Sydney Garrioch; 4,087; 20.36%	Niki Ashton; 10,262; 51.12%	Alberteen Spence; 471; 2.35%		Niki Ashton
Dauphin—Swan River— Marquette	Robert Sopuck; 18,543; 63.09%	Wendy Menzies; 1,947; 6.62%	Cheryl Osborne; 7,657; 26.05%	Kate Storey; 1,243; 4.23%		Robert Sopuck
Portage—Lisgar	Candice Hoeppner; 26,899; 75.99%	M.J. Willard; 2,221; 6.27%	Mohamed Alli; 3,478; 9.83%	Matthew Friesen; 1,996; 5.64%	Jerome Dondo (CHP); 805; 2.27%	Candice Hoeppner
Provencher	Vic Toews; 27,820; 70.60%	Terry Hayward; 2,645; 6.71%	Al Mackling; 7,051; 17.89%	Janine Gibson; 1,164; 2.95%	Ric Lim (Pirate); 215 0.55%	Vic Toews
Provencher	Vic Toews; 27,820; 70.60%	Terry Hayward; 2,645; 6.71%	Al Mackling; 7,051; 17.89%	Janine Gibson; 1,164; 2.95%	David Reimer (CHP); 510 1.29%	Vic Toews
Selkirk—Interlake	James Bezan; 26,848; 65.19%	Duncan Geisler; 1,980; 4.81%	Sean Palsson; 10,933; 26.55%	Don Winstone; 1,423; 3.46%		James Bezan

=== Winnipeg ===
Electoral district	Candidates					Incumbent
Electoral district	Conservative	Liberal	NDP	Green	Other	Incumbent
Charleswood—St. James— Assiniboia	Steven Fletcher; 23,264; 57.56%	Rob Clement; 7,433; 18.39%	Tom Paulley; 8,134; 20.12%	Denali Enns; 1,587; 3.93%		Steven Fletcher
Elmwood—Transcona	Lawrence Toet; 15,298; 46.40%	Ilona Niemczyk; 1,660; 5.03%	Jim Maloway; 14,998; 45.49%	Ellen Young; 1,017; 3.08%		Jim Maloway
Kildonan—St. Paul	Joy Smith; 22,670; 58.16%	Victor Andres; 3,199; 8.21%	Rachelle Devine; 11,727; 30.09%	Alon David Weinberg; 1,020; 2.62%	Eduard Hiebert (Ind.); 145 0.37%	Joy Smith
Kildonan—St. Paul	Joy Smith; 22,670; 58.16%	Victor Andres; 3,199; 8.21%	Rachelle Devine; 11,727; 30.09%	Alon David Weinberg; 1,020; 2.62%	Brett Ryall (Ind.); 218 0.56%	Joy Smith
Saint Boniface	Shelly Glover; 21,737; 50.28%	Raymond Simard; 13,314; 30.80%	Patrice Miniely; 6,935; 16.04%	Marc Payette; 1,245; 2.88%		Shelly Glover
Winnipeg Centre	Bev Pitura; 7,173; 27.64%	Allan Wise; 2,872; 11.07%	Pat Martin; 13,928; 53.66%	Jacqueline Romanow; 1,830; 7.05%	Darrell Rankin (Comm.); 152; 0.59%	Pat Martin
Winnipeg North	Ann Matejicka; 6,701; 26.35%	Kevin Lamoureux; 9,097; 35.78%	Rebecca Blaikie; 9,053; 35.60%	John Harvie; 458; 1.80%	Frank Komarniski (Comm.); 118; 0.46%	Kevin Lamoureux
Winnipeg South	Rod Bruinooge; 22,840; 52.24%	Terry Duguid; 14,296; 32.70%	Dave Gaudreau; 5,693; 13.02%	Caitlyn McIntyre; 889; 2.03%		Rod Bruinooge
Winnipeg South Centre	Joyce Bateman; 15,506; 38.82%	Anita Neville; 14,784; 37.02%	Dennis Lewycky; 7,945; 19.89%	Joshua McNeil; 1,383; 3.46%	Lyndon B. Froese (Ind.); 103 0.26%	Anita Neville
Winnipeg South Centre	Joyce Bateman; 15,506; 38.82%	Anita Neville; 14,784; 37.02%	Dennis Lewycky; 7,945; 19.89%	Joshua McNeil; 1,383; 3.46%	Matt Henderson (Ind.); 218 0.55%	Anita Neville

== Saskatchewan ==
=== Southern Saskatchewan ===
Electoral district	Candidates					Incumbent
Electoral district	Conservative	Liberal	NDP	Green	Independent	Incumbent
Cypress Hills—Grasslands	David Anderson; 20,555; 69.85%	Duane Filson; 1,838; 6.25%	Trevor Peterson; 6,248; 21.23%	Helmi Scott; 788; 2.68%		David Anderson
Palliser	Ray Boughen; 15,850; 47.00%	Russ Collicott; 1,797; 5.33%	Noah Patrick Evanchuk; 15,084; 44.73%	Larissa Shasko; 995; 2.95%		Ray Boughen
Regina—Lumsden— Lake Centre	Tom Lukiwski; 18,076; 53.21%	Monica Lysack; 2,467; 7.26%	Brian Sklar; 12,518; 36.85%	Billy Patterson; 911; 2.68%		Tom Lukiwski
Regina—Qu'Appelle	Andrew Scheer; 15,896; 53.48%	Jackie Miller; 1,400; 4.71%	Fred Clipsham; 11,419; 38.42%	Greg Chatterson; 879; 2.96%	Jeff Breti; 127; 0.43%	Andrew Scheer
Souris—Moose Mountain	Ed Komarnicki; 21,598; 73.98%	Gerald Borrowman; 1,236; 4.23%	Allan Arthur; 5,461; 18.71%	Bob Deptuck; 898; 3.08%		Ed Komarnicki
Wascana	Ian Shields; 14,291; 36.88%	Ralph Goodale; 15,823; 40.83%	Marc Spooner; 7,681; 19.82%	Bill Clary; 954; 2.46%		Ralph Goodale
Yorkton—Melville	Garry Breitkreuz; 21,906; 68.93%	Kash Andreychuk; 2,167; 6.82%	Doug Ottenbreit; 6,931; 21.81%	Elaine Hughes; 774; 2.44%		Garry Breitkreuz

=== Northern Saskatchewan ===
Electoral district	Candidates					Incumbent
Electoral district	Conservative	Liberal	NDP	Green	Other	Incumbent
Battlefords—Lloydminster	Gerry Ritz; 19,203; 66.90%	Jordan LaPlante; 950; 3.31%	Glenn Tait; 7,767; 27.06%	Norbert Kratchmer; 785; 2.73%		Gerry Ritz
Blackstrap	Lynne Yelich; 23,280; 54.40%	Deborah J. Walker; 2,713; 6.34%	Darien Moore; 15,769; 36.85%	Shawn Setyo; 1,033; 2.41%		Lynne Yelich
Desnethé—Missinippi— Churchill River	Rob Gordon Clarke; 10,509; 47.93%	Gabe Lafond; 1,144; 5.22%	Lawrence Joseph; 9,715; 44.30%	George Morin; 560; 2.55%		Rob Clarke
Prince Albert	Randy Hoback; 19,214; 62.17%	Ron Wassill; 1,070; 3.46%	Valerie Mushinski; 9,841; 31.84%	Myk Brazier; 666; 2.15%	Craig Leonard Batley (CAP); 116; 0.38%	Randy Hoback
Saskatoon—Humboldt	Brad Trost; 19,954; 52.72%	Darren Hill; 3,013; 7.96%	Denise Kouri; 13,271; 35.07%	Sandra Finley; 926; 2.45%	Jim Pankiw (Ind.); 682; 1.80%	Brad Trost
Saskatoon—Rosetown— Biggar	Kelly Block; 14,652; 48.70%	Lee Reaney; 697; 2.32%	Nettie Wiebe; 14,114; 46.91%	Vicki Strelioff; 626; 2.08%		Kelly Block
Saskatoon—Wanuskewin	Maurice Vellacott; 21,183; 58.43%	Patricia Zipchen; 2,428; 6.70%	John Parry; 11,395; 31.43%	Mark Bigland-Pritchard; 1,250; 3.45%		Maurice Vellacott

== Alberta ==
=== Rural Alberta ===
Electoral district	Candidates					Incumbent
Electoral district	Conservative	Liberal	NDP	Green	Other	Incumbent
Crowfoot	Kevin A Sorenson; 44,115; 83.99%	Omar Harb; 1,224; 2.33%	Ellen Parker; 4,805; 9.15%	Konrad Schellenberg; 1,711; 3.26%	Gerard Groenendijk (CHP); 204 0.39%	Kevin Sorenson
Crowfoot	Kevin A Sorenson; 44,115; 83.99%	Omar Harb; 1,224; 2.33%	Ellen Parker; 4,805; 9.15%	Konrad Schellenberg; 1,711; 3.26%	John C. Turner (Ind.); 463 0.88%	Kevin Sorenson
Fort McMurray—Athabasca	Brian Jean; 21,988; 71.84%	Karen Young; 3,190; 10.42%	Berend Wilting; 4,053; 13.24%	Jule Asterisk; 1,374; 4.49%		Brian Jean
Lethbridge	Jim Hillyer; 27,173; 56.51%	Michael Cormican; 4,030; 8.38%	Mark Sandilands; 13,072; 27.18%	Cailin Bartlett; 2,095; 4.36%	Geoffrey Capp (CHP); 1,716; 3.57%	Rick Casson†
Macleod	Ted Menzies; 40,007; 77.48%	Nicole Hankel; 1,898; 3.68	Janine Giles; 5,335; 10.33%	Attila Nagy; 2,389; 4.63%	Brad Carrigan (PC); 1,754 3.40%	Ted Menzies
Macleod	Ted Menzies; 40,007; 77.48%	Nicole Hankel; 1,898; 3.68	Janine Giles; 5,335; 10.33%	Attila Nagy; 2,389; 4.63%	Marc Slingerland (CHP); 252 0.49%	Ted Menzies
Medicine Hat	LaVar Payne; 30,719; 71.55%	Norm Boucher; 4,416; 10.29%	Dennis Perrier; 5,616; 13.08%	Graham Murray; 1,868; 4.35%	Frans VandeStroet (CHP); 317; 0.74%	LaVar Payne
Peace River	Chris Warkentin; 36,334; 75.76%	Corina Ganton; 1,481; 3.09%	Jennifer Villeburn; 7,740; 16.14%	Wayne John Kamieniecki; 1,702; 3.55%	Donovan Eckstrom (Rhino); 345 0.72%	Chris Warkentin
Peace River	Chris Warkentin; 36,334; 75.76%	Corina Ganton; 1,481; 3.09%	Jennifer Villeburn; 7,740; 16.14%	Wayne John Kamieniecki; 1,702; 3.55%	Russ Toews (Ind.); 359 0.75%	Chris Warkentin
Red Deer	Earl Dreeshen; 37,959; 75.93%	Andrew Lineker; 1,918; 3.84%	Stuart Somerville; 7,566; 15.13%	Mason Connor Woodruff Sisson; 2,551; 5.10%		Earl Dreeshen
Vegreville—Wainwright	Leon Benoit; 39,145; 79.79%	Ron Williams; 1,525; 3.11%	Ray A Stone; 5,561; 11.34%	William Munsey; 2,499; 5.09%	Matthew Sokalski (CHP); 327; 0.67%	Leon Benoit
Westlock—St. Paul	Brian Storseth; 32,652; 77.82%	Rob Fox; 2,569; 6.12%	Lyndsey Ellen Henderson; 5,103; 12.16%	Lisa Grant; 1,634; 3.89%		Brian Storseth
Wetaskiwin	Blaine Calkins; 37,756; 81.44%	Christopher Anderson; 1,348; 2.91%	Tim Robson; 5,281; 11.39%	Robert Johnston; 1,978; 4.27%		Blaine Calkins
Wild Rose	Blake Richards; 43,669; 74.74%	John Douglas Reilly; 3,908; 6.69%	Jeff Horvath; 6,595; 11.29%	Mike MacDonald; 4,071; 6.97%	Randy Vanden Broek (CHP); 181; 0.31%	Blake Richards
Yellowhead	Rob Merrifield; 31,925; 77.03%	Zack Siezmagraff; 1,190; 2.87%	Mark Wells; 5,411; 13.06%	Monika Schaefer; 2,122; 5.14%	Melissa Brade (CAP); 384 0.93%	Rob Merrifield
Yellowhead	Rob Merrifield; 31,925; 77.03%	Zack Siezmagraff; 1,190; 2.87%	Mark Wells; 5,411; 13.06%	Monika Schaefer; 2,122; 5.14%	Jacob Strydhorst (CHP); 404 0.97%	Rob Merrifield

=== Edmonton and environs ===
Electoral district	Candidates					Incumbent
Electoral district	Conservative	Liberal	NDP	Green	Other	Incumbent
Edmonton Centre	Laurie Hawn; 23,625; 48.03%	Mary MacDonald; 11,037; 22.44%	Lewis Cardinal; 12,480; 25.37%	David James Parker; 1,676; 3.41%	Peggy Morton (M-L); 81 0.16%	Laurie Hawn
Edmonton Centre	Laurie Hawn; 23,625; 48.03%	Mary MacDonald; 11,037; 22.44%	Lewis Cardinal; 12,480; 25.37%	David James Parker; 1,676; 3.41%	**Mikkel Paulson** (Pirate); 289 0.59%	Laurie Hawn
Edmonton East	Peter Goldring; 24,111; 52.75%	Shafik Ruda; 3,176; 6.95%	Ray Martin; 17,078; 37.36%	Trey Capnerhurst; 1,345; 2.94%		Peter Goldring
Edmonton—Leduc	James Rajotte; 37,778; 63.57%	Richard Fahlman; 7,270; 12.23%	Artem Medvedev; 11,488; 19.33%	Valerie Kennedy; 2,896; 4.87%		James Rajotte
Edmonton—Mill Woods— Beaumont	Mike Lake; 27,857; 61.04%	Mike Butler; 5,066; 11.10%	Nadine Bailey; 10,875; 23.83%	Christa Baxter; 1,364; 2.99%	Naomi Rankin (Comm.); 100 0.22%	Mike Lake
Edmonton—Mill Woods— Beaumont	Mike Lake; 27,857; 61.04%	Mike Butler; 5,066; 11.10%	Nadine Bailey; 10,875; 23.83%	Christa Baxter; 1,364; 2.99%	Brent Schaffrick (Pirate); 374 0.82%	Mike Lake
Edmonton—St. Albert	Brent Rathgeber; 34,468; 63.46%	Kevin Taron; 5,796; 10.67%	Brian LaBelle; 11,644; 21.44%	Peter Johnston; 2,409; 4.44%		Brent Rathgeber
Edmonton—Sherwood Park	Tim Uppal; 24,623; 44.66%	Rick Szostak; 4,131; 7.49%	Mike Scott; 7,971; 14.46%	Chris Vallee; 1,926; 3.49%	James Ford (Ind.); 16,263 29.50%	Tim Uppal
Edmonton—Sherwood Park	Tim Uppal; 24,623; 44.66%	Rick Szostak; 4,131; 7.49%	Mike Scott; 7,971; 14.46%	Chris Vallee; 1,926; 3.49%	Paul St. Laurent (WBP); 222 0.40%	Tim Uppal
Edmonton—Spruce Grove	Rona Ambrose; 41,782; 71.10%	Chris Austin; 5,483; 9.33%	Catherine Chaulk-Stokes; 9,272; 15.78%	Joshua Lund; 2,232; 3.80%		Rona Ambrose
Edmonton—Strathcona	Ryan Hastman; 19,762; 40.55%	Matthew Sinclair; 1,372; 2.82%	Linda Duncan; 26,093; 53.55%	Andrew Fehr; 1,119; 2.30%	Kevan Hunter (M-L); 91 0.19%	Linda Duncan
Edmonton—Strathcona	Ryan Hastman; 19,762; 40.55%	Matthew Sinclair; 1,372; 2.82%	Linda Duncan; 26,093; 53.55%	Andrew Fehr; 1,119; 2.30%	Kyle Murphy (Ind.); 206 0.42%	Linda Duncan
Edmonton—Strathcona	Ryan Hastman; 19,762; 40.55%	Matthew Sinclair; 1,372; 2.82%	Linda Duncan; 26,093; 53.55%	Andrew Fehr; 1,119; 2.30%	Christopher White (Ind.); 87 0.18%	Linda Duncan

=== Calgary ===
Electoral district	Candidates					Incumbent
Electoral district	Conservative	Liberal	NDP	Green	Other	Incumbent
Calgary Centre	Lee Richardson; 28,401; 57.68%	Jennifer Pollock; 8,631; 17.53%	Donna Marlis Montgomery; 7,314; 14.86%	William Hamilton; 4,889; 9.93%		Lee Richardson
Calgary Centre-North	Michelle Rempel; 28,443; 56.53%	Stephen James Randall; 7,046; 14.00%	Paul Vargis; 8,048; 15.99%	Heather MacIntosh; 6,578; 13.07%	Peggy Askin (M-L); 203; 0.40%	Vacant
Calgary East	Deepak Obhrai; 23,372; 67.43%	Josipa Petrunic; 4,102; 11.83%	Al Brown; 4,894; 14.12%	Scott W. Milton; 2,047; 5.91%	Jason Devine (Comm.); 246; 0.71%	Deepak Obhrai
Calgary Northeast	Devinder Shory; 23,550; 56.80%	Cam Stewart; 11,487; 27.71%	Colette Singh; 4,262; 10.28%	Sheila Brown-Eckersley; 1,953; 4.71%	Daniel Blanchard (M-L); 206; 0.50%	Devinder Shory
Calgary—Nose Hill	Diane Ablonczy; 40,384; 70.17%	Margaret McLeod; 6,501; 11.30%	Collin Anderson; 7,189; 12.49%	Tony Hajj; 3,480; 6.05%		Diane Ablonczy
Calgary Southeast	Jason Kenney; 48,173; 76.26%	Brian N. MacPhee; 4,020; 6.36%	Kirk Oates; 6,482; 10.26%	Brett Spencer; 4,079; 6.46%	Antoni Grochowski (Ind.); 225 0.36%	Jason Kenney
Calgary Southeast	Jason Kenney; 48,173; 76.26%	Brian N. MacPhee; 4,020; 6.36%	Kirk Oates; 6,482; 10.26%	Brett Spencer; 4,079; 6.46%	Paul Fromm (WBP); 193 0.31%	Jason Kenney
Calgary Southwest	**Stephen J Harper**; 42,998; 75.12%	Marlene Lamontagne; 4,121; 7.20%	Holly Heffernan; 6,823; 11.92%	Kelly Christie; 2,991; 5.23%	Larry R. Heather (Ind.); 303; 0.53%	**Stephen Harper**
Calgary West	Robert Anders; 39,996; 62.16%	Janice Kinch; 11,374; 17.68%	Shawna Knowles; 6,679; 10.38%	Anna Lisa Wagner; 6,070; 9.43%	André Vachon (M-L); 227; 0.35%	Robert Anders

== British Columbia ==
=== BC Interior ===
Electoral district	Candidates					Incumbent
Electoral district	Conservative	Liberal	NDP	Green	Other	Incumbent
British Columbia Southern Interior	Stephen Hill; 19,273; 38.93%	Shan Lavell; 1,872; 3.78%	Alex Atamanenko; 25,206; 50.92%	Bryan Hunt; 3,153; 6.37%		Alex Atamanenko
Cariboo—Prince George	Dick Harris; 24,443; 56.17%	Sangeeta Lalli; 2,200; 5.06%	Jon Van Barneveld; 13,135; 30.18%	Heidi Redl; 2,702; 6.21%	Jon Ronan (Ind.); 394 0.91%	Dick Harris
Cariboo—Prince George	Dick Harris; 24,443; 56.17%	Sangeeta Lalli; 2,200; 5.06%	Jon Van Barneveld; 13,135; 30.18%	Heidi Redl; 2,702; 6.21%	Henry Thiessen (CHP); 440 1.01%	Dick Harris
Cariboo—Prince George	Dick Harris; 24,443; 56.17%	Sangeeta Lalli; 2,200; 5.06%	Jon Van Barneveld; 13,135; 30.18%	Heidi Redl; 2,702; 6.21%	Jordan Turner (Rhino); 204 0.47%	Dick Harris
Kamloops—Thompson— Cariboo	Cathy McLeod; 29,682; 52.24%	Murray Todd; 3,026; 5.33%	Michael David Crawford; 20,983; 36.93%	Donovan Michael Cavers; 2,932; 5.16%	Christopher Kempling (CHP); 191; 0.34%	Cathy McLeod
Kelowna—Lake Country	Ron Cannan; 34,566; 57.40%	Kris Stewart; 7,069; 11.74%	Tisha Kalmanovitch; 13,322; 22.12%	Alice Hooper; 5,265; 8.74%		Ron Cannan
Kootenay—Columbia	David Wilks; 23,910; 55.88%	Betty Aitchison; 1,496; 3.50%	Mark Shmigelsky; 14,199; 33.18%	Bill Green; 2,547; 5.95%	Brent Bush (Ind.); 636; 1.49%	Jim Abbott†
Okanagan—Coquihalla	Dan Albas; 28,525; 53.58%	John Kidder; 5,815; 10.92%	David Finnis; 12,853; 24.14%	Dan Bouchard; 5,005; 9.40%	Sean Upshaw (Ind.); 860 1.62%	Stockwell Day†
Okanagan—Coquihalla	Dan Albas; 28,525; 53.58%	John Kidder; 5,815; 10.92%	David Finnis; 12,853; 24.14%	Dan Bouchard; 5,005; 9.40%	Dietrich Wittel (Ind.); 180 0.34%	Stockwell Day†
Okanagan—Shuswap	Colin Mayes; 31,439; 55.45%	Janna Francis; 4,246; 7.49%	Nikki Inouye; 14,955; 26.38%	Greig Crockett; 6,058; 10.68%		Colin Mayes
Prince George— Peace River	Bob Zimmer; 23,946; 62.12%	Ben Levine; 2,008; 5.21%	Lois Boone; 9,876; 25.62%	Hilary Crowley; 2,301; 5.97%	Jeremy Coté (Pirate); 415; 1.08%	Vacant
Skeena—Bulkley Valley	Clay Harmon; 12,117; 34.50%	Kyle Warwick; 1,268; 3.61%	Nathan Paul Cullen; 19,431; 55.33%	Roger Benham; 1,102; 3.14%	Maggie Braun (CAP); 165 0.47%	Nathan Cullen
Skeena—Bulkley Valley	Clay Harmon; 12,117; 34.50%	Kyle Warwick; 1,268; 3.61%	Nathan Paul Cullen; 19,431; 55.33%	Roger Benham; 1,102; 3.14%	Rod Taylor (CHP); 1,038 2.96%	Nathan Cullen

=== Fraser Valley and Southern Lower Mainland ===
Electoral district	Candidates					Incumbent
Electoral district	Conservative	Liberal	NDP	Green	Other	Incumbent
Abbotsford	Ed Fast; 32,493; 65.02%	Madeleine Hardin; 4,968; 9.94%	David Alan Murray; 10,089; 20.19%	Daniel Bryce; 2,138; 4.28%	David MacKay (M-L); 286; 0.57%	Ed Fast
Chilliwack—Fraser Canyon	Mark Strahl; 28,160; 57.20%	Diane Janzen; 5,320; 10.81%	Gwen O'Mahony; 12,691; 25.78%	Jamie Hoskins; 2,706; 5.50%	Clive Edwards (WBP); 180 0.37%	Chuck Strahl†
Chilliwack—Fraser Canyon	Mark Strahl; 28,160; 57.20%	Diane Janzen; 5,320; 10.81%	Gwen O'Mahony; 12,691; 25.78%	Jamie Hoskins; 2,706; 5.50%	Dorothy-Jean O'Donnell (M-L); 173 0.35%	Chuck Strahl†
Delta—Richmond East	Kerry-Lynne Findlay; 26,059; 54.24%	Alan Beesley; 8,112; 16.88%	Nic Slater; 11,181; 23.27%	Duane Laird; 2,324; 4.84%	Jeff Monds (Libert.); 147 0.31%	John Cummins†
Delta—Richmond East	Kerry-Lynne Findlay; 26,059; 54.24%	Alan Beesley; 8,112; 16.88%	Nic Slater; 11,181; 23.27%	Duane Laird; 2,324; 4.84%	John Shavluk (Ind.); 220 0.46%	John Cummins†
Fleetwood—Port Kells	Nina Grewal; 23,950; 47.55%	Pam Dhanoa; 8,041; 15.96%	Nao Fernando; 16,533; 32.82%	Alan Saldanha; 1,476; 2.93%	Alex Joehl (Libert.); 370; 0.73%	Nina Grewal
Langley	Mark Warawa; 35,569; 64.52%	Rebecca Darnell; 4,990; 9.05%	Piotr Majkowski; 11,277; 20.45%	Carey Ann Poitras; 2,943; 5.34%	Craig Nobbs (Pirate); 353; 0.64%	Mark Warawa
Newton—North Delta	Mani Fallon; 14,437; 31.30%	Sukh Dhaliwal; 14,510; 31.46%	Jinny Sims; 15,413; 33.42%	Liz Walker; 1,520; 3.30%	Ravi S. Gill (Ind.); 123 0.27%	Sukh Dhaliwal
Newton—North Delta	Mani Fallon; 14,437; 31.30%	Sukh Dhaliwal; 14,510; 31.46%	Jinny Sims; 15,413; 33.42%	Liz Walker; 1,520; 3.30%	Samuel Frank Hammond (Comm.); 116 0.25%	Sukh Dhaliwal
Pitt Meadows— Maple Ridge—Mission	Randy Kamp; 28,803; 54.34%	Mandeep Bhuller; 2,739; 5.17%	Craig Speirs; 18,835; 35.53%	Peter Tam; 2,629; 4.96%		Randy Kamp
Richmond	Alice Wong; 25,109; 58.36%	Joe Peschisolido; 8,027; 18.66%	Dale Jackaman; 7,860; 18.27%	Michael Wolfe; 2,032; 4.72%		Alice Wong
South Surrey— White Rock—Cloverdale	Russ Hiebert; 31,990; 54.55%	Hardy Staub; 9,775; 16.67%	Susan Keeping; 11,881; 20.26%	Larry Colero; 3,245; 5.53%	Kevin Peter Donohoe (Ind.); 152 0.26%	Russ Hiebert
South Surrey— White Rock—Cloverdale	Russ Hiebert; 31,990; 54.55%	Hardy Staub; 9,775; 16.67%	Susan Keeping; 11,881; 20.26%	Larry Colero; 3,245; 5.53%	David Hawkins (Ind.); 189 0.32%	Russ Hiebert
South Surrey— White Rock—Cloverdale	Russ Hiebert; 31,990; 54.55%	Hardy Staub; 9,775; 16.67%	Susan Keeping; 11,881; 20.26%	Larry Colero; 3,245; 5.53%	Aart Looye (Ind.); 753 1.28%	Russ Hiebert
South Surrey— White Rock—Cloverdale	Russ Hiebert; 31,990; 54.55%	Hardy Staub; 9,775; 16.67%	Susan Keeping; 11,881; 20.26%	Larry Colero; 3,245; 5.53%	Brian Marlatt (PC); 228 0.39%	Russ Hiebert
South Surrey— White Rock—Cloverdale	Russ Hiebert; 31,990; 54.55%	Hardy Staub; 9,775; 16.67%	Susan Keeping; 11,881; 20.26%	Larry Colero; 3,245; 5.53%	Mike Schouten (CHP); 429 0.73%	Russ Hiebert
Surrey North	Dona Cadman; 13,181; 35.64%	Shinder Purewal; 6,797; 18.38%	Jasbir Sandhu; 14,678; 39.69%	Bernadette Keenan; 1,289; 3.49%	Norris Barens (Libert.); 284 0.77%	Dona Cadman
Surrey North	Dona Cadman; 13,181; 35.64%	Shinder Purewal; 6,797; 18.38%	Jasbir Sandhu; 14,678; 39.69%	Bernadette Keenan; 1,289; 3.49%	Kevin Pielak (CHP); 303 0.82%	Dona Cadman
Surrey North	Dona Cadman; 13,181; 35.64%	Shinder Purewal; 6,797; 18.38%	Jasbir Sandhu; 14,678; 39.69%	Bernadette Keenan; 1,289; 3.49%	Jamie Scott (Ind.); 451 1.22%	Dona Cadman

=== Vancouver and Northern Lower Mainland ===
Electoral district	Candidates					Incumbent
Electoral district	Conservative	Liberal	NDP	Green	Other	Incumbent
Burnaby—Douglas	Ronald Leung; 19,932; 40.92%	Ken Low; 5,451; 11.19%	Kennedy Stewart; 20,943; 43.00%	Adrianne Merlo; 1,754; 3.60%	Lewis Clarke Dahlby (Libert.); 420 0.86%	Bill Siksay†
Burnaby—Douglas	Ronald Leung; 19,932; 40.92%	Ken Low; 5,451; 11.19%	Kennedy Stewart; 20,943; 43.00%	Adrianne Merlo; 1,754; 3.60%	George Gidora (Comm.); 153 0.31%	Bill Siksay†
Burnaby—Douglas	Ronald Leung; 19,932; 40.92%	Ken Low; 5,451; 11.19%	Kennedy Stewart; 20,943; 43.00%	Adrianne Merlo; 1,754; 3.60%	Brian Sproule (M-L); 57 0.12%	Bill Siksay†
Burnaby— New Westminster	Paul Forseth; 16,009; 35.83%	Garth Evans; 4,496; 10.06%	Peter Julian; 22,193; 49.67%	Carrie McLaren; 1,731; 3.87%	Tyler Pierce (Libert.); 160 0.36%	Peter Julian
Burnaby— New Westminster	Paul Forseth; 16,009; 35.83%	Garth Evans; 4,496; 10.06%	Peter Julian; 22,193; 49.67%	Carrie McLaren; 1,731; 3.87%	Joseph Theriault (M-L); 94 0.21%	Peter Julian
New Westminster— Coquitlam	Diana Dilworth; 20,776; 41.45%	Ken Beck Lee; 4,069; 8.12%	Fin Donnelly; 23,023; 45.93%	Rebecca Helps; 2,160; 4.31%	Roland Verrier (M-L); 95; 0.19%	Fin Donnelly
North Vancouver	Andrew Saxton; 28,996; 48.62%	Taleeb Noormohamed; 17,665; 29.62%	Michael Charrois; 9,617; 16.13%	Greg Dowman; 3,004; 5.04%	Nick Jones (Ind.); 350; 0.59%	Andrew Saxton
Port Moody—Westwood— Port Coquitlam	James Moore; 27,181; 56.07%	Stewart McGillivray; 4,110; 8.48%	Mark Ireland; 14,600; 30.12%	Kevin Kim; 2,161; 4.46%	Paul Geddes (Libert.); 421; 0.87%	James Moore
Vancouver Centre	Jennifer Clarke; 15,323; 26.04%	Hedy Fry; 18,260; 31.03%	Karen Shillington; 15,325; 26.04%	Adriane Carr; 9,089; 15.44%	John Clarke (Libert.); 313 0.53%	Hedy Fry
Vancouver Centre	Jennifer Clarke; 15,323; 26.04%	Hedy Fry; 18,260; 31.03%	Karen Shillington; 15,325; 26.04%	Adriane Carr; 9,089; 15.44%	Michael Hill (M-L); 62 0.11%	Hedy Fry
Vancouver Centre	Jennifer Clarke; 15,323; 26.04%	Hedy Fry; 18,260; 31.03%	Karen Shillington; 15,325; 26.04%	Adriane Carr; 9,089; 15.44%	Michael Huenefeld (PC); 285 0.48%	Hedy Fry
Vancouver Centre	Jennifer Clarke; 15,323; 26.04%	Hedy Fry; 18,260; 31.03%	Karen Shillington; 15,325; 26.04%	Adriane Carr; 9,089; 15.44%	Travis McCrea (Pirate); 192 0.33%	Hedy Fry
Vancouver East	Irene C. Yatco; 8,361; 18.90%	Roma Ahi; 4,382; 9.91%	Libby Davies; 27,794; 62.83%	Douglas Roy; 3,383; 7.65%	Anne Jamieson (M-L); 318; 0.72%	Libby Davies
Vancouver Kingsway	Trang Nguyen; 13,157; 28.10%	Wendy Yuan; 7,796; 16.65%	Don Davies; 23,452; 50.08%	Louise Boutin; 1,860; 3.97%	Kimball Cariou (Comm.); 210 0.45%	Don Davies
Vancouver Kingsway	Trang Nguyen; 13,157; 28.10%	Wendy Yuan; 7,796; 16.65%	Don Davies; 23,452; 50.08%	Louise Boutin; 1,860; 3.97%	Matt Kadioglu (Libert.); 275 0.59%	Don Davies
Vancouver Kingsway	Trang Nguyen; 13,157; 28.10%	Wendy Yuan; 7,796; 16.65%	Don Davies; 23,452; 50.08%	Louise Boutin; 1,860; 3.97%	Donna Petersen (M-L); 78 0.17%	Don Davies
Vancouver Quadra	Deborah Meredith; 20,984; 38.64%	Joyce Murray; 22,903; 42.17%	Victor Edward Elkins; 7,499; 13.81%	Laura-Leah Shaw; 2,922; 5.38%		Joyce Murray
Vancouver South	Wai Young; 19,504; 43.31%	Ujjal Dosanjh; 15,604; 34.65%	Meena Wong; 8,552; 18.99%	Jean de Dieu Hakizimana; 1,151; 2.56%	Charles Boylan (M-L); 222; 0.49%	Ujjal Dosanjh
West Vancouver— Sunshine Coast— Sea to Sky Country	John Dunbar Weston; 28,614; 45.53%	Dan Veniez; 14,123; 22.47%	Terry Platt; 14,828; 23.59%	Brennan Wauters; 4,436; 7.06%	Tunya Audain (Libert.); 250 0.40%	John Weston
West Vancouver— Sunshine Coast— Sea to Sky Country	John Dunbar Weston; 28,614; 45.53%	Dan Veniez; 14,123; 22.47%	Terry Platt; 14,828; 23.59%	Brennan Wauters; 4,436; 7.06%	Carol Lee Chapman (M-L); 87 0.14%	John Weston
West Vancouver— Sunshine Coast— Sea to Sky Country	John Dunbar Weston; 28,614; 45.53%	Dan Veniez; 14,123; 22.47%	Terry Platt; 14,828; 23.59%	Brennan Wauters; 4,436; 7.06%	Doug Hartt (CAP); 64 0.10%	John Weston
West Vancouver— Sunshine Coast— Sea to Sky Country	John Dunbar Weston; 28,614; 45.53%	Dan Veniez; 14,123; 22.47%	Terry Platt; 14,828; 23.59%	Brennan Wauters; 4,436; 7.06%	Allan Holt (WBP); 156 0.25%	John Weston
West Vancouver— Sunshine Coast— Sea to Sky Country	John Dunbar Weston; 28,614; 45.53%	Dan Veniez; 14,123; 22.47%	Terry Platt; 14,828; 23.59%	Brennan Wauters; 4,436; 7.06%	Roger Lagassé (PC); 293 0.47%	John Weston

=== Vancouver Island ===
Electoral district	Candidates					Incumbent
Electoral district	Conservative	Liberal	NDP	Green	Other	Incumbent
Esquimalt—Juan de Fuca	Troy DeSouza; 25,792; 40.24%	Lillian Szpak; 6,439; 10.05%	Randall C. Garrison; 26,198; 40.87%	Shaunna Salsman; 5,341; 8.33%	Louis James Lesosky (Ind.); 181 0.28%	Keith Martin†
Esquimalt—Juan de Fuca	Troy DeSouza; 25,792; 40.24%	Lillian Szpak; 6,439; 10.05%	Randall C. Garrison; 26,198; 40.87%	Shaunna Salsman; 5,341; 8.33%	**Christopher Robert Porter** (CAP); 145 0.23%	Keith Martin†
Nanaimo—Alberni	James Lunney; 30,469; 46.42%	Renée Amber Miller; 4,984; 7.59%	Zenaida Maartman; 25,165; 38.34%	Myron Jespersen; 4,482; 6.83%	Barbara Biley (M-L); 81 0.12%	James Lunney
Nanaimo—Alberni	James Lunney; 30,469; 46.42%	Renée Amber Miller; 4,984; 7.59%	Zenaida Maartman; 25,165; 38.34%	Myron Jespersen; 4,482; 6.83%	Jesse Schroeder (Pirate); 363 0.55%	James Lunney
Nanaimo—Alberni	James Lunney; 30,469; 46.42%	Renée Amber Miller; 4,984; 7.59%	Zenaida Maartman; 25,165; 38.34%	Myron Jespersen; 4,482; 6.83%	Frank Wagner (CHP); 94 0.14%	James Lunney
Nanaimo—Cowichan	John Koury; 24,497; 38.31%	Brian Fillmore; 3,007; 4.70%	Jean Crowder; 31,272; 48.90%	Anne Marie Benoit; 5,005; 7.83%	Jack East (M-L); 170; 0.27%	Jean Crowder
Saanich—Gulf Islands	Gary Lunn; 24,544; 35.66%	Renée Hetherington; 4,208; 6.11%	Edith Loring-Kuhanga; 8,185; 11.89%	**Elizabeth May**; 31,890; 46.33%		Gary Lunn
Vancouver Island North	John Duncan; 27,206; 46.11%	Mike Holland; 3,039; 5.15%	Ronna-Rae Leonard; 25,379; 43.01%	Sue Moen; 3,018; 5.11%	Jason Draper (Ind.); 304 0.52%	John Duncan
Vancouver Island North	John Duncan; 27,206; 46.11%	Mike Holland; 3,039; 5.15%	Ronna-Rae Leonard; 25,379; 43.01%	Sue Moen; 3,018; 5.11%	Frank Martin (M-L); 57 0.10%	John Duncan
Victoria	Patrick Hunt; 14,275; 23.63%	Christopher Causton; 8,448; 13.98%	Denise Savoie; 30,679; 50.78%	Jared Giesbrecht; 7,015; 11.61%		Denise Savoie

== Nunavut ==
Electoral district	Candidates				Incumbent
Electoral district	Conservative	Liberal	NDP	Green	Incumbent
Nunavut	Leona Aglukkaq; 3,930; 49.90%	Paul Okalik; 2,260; 28.70%	Jack Hicks; 1,525; 19.37%	Scott MacCallum; 160; 2.03%	Leona Aglukkaq

== Northwest Territories ==
Electoral district	Candidates					Incumbent
Electoral district	Conservative	Liberal	NDP	Green	AAEVP	Incumbent
Western Arctic	Sandy Lee; 5,001; 32.11%	Joe Handley; 2,872; 18.44%	Dennis Bevington; 7,140; 45.84%	Eli Purchase; 477; 3.06%	Bonnie Dawson; 87; 0.56%	Dennis Bevington

== Yukon ==
Electoral district	Candidates				Incumbent
Electoral district	Conservative	Liberal	NDP	Green	Incumbent
Yukon	Ryan Leef; 5,422; 33.77%	Larry Bagnell; 5,290; 32.95%	Kevin Barr; 2,308; 14.37%	John Streicker; 3,037; 18.91%	Larry Bagnell

== See also ==
- Results of the Canadian federal election, 2011
- Results by riding for the Canadian federal election, 2008
- Results of the Canadian federal election, 2006: All on one page
