= Michel Picard (politician) =

Canadian politician

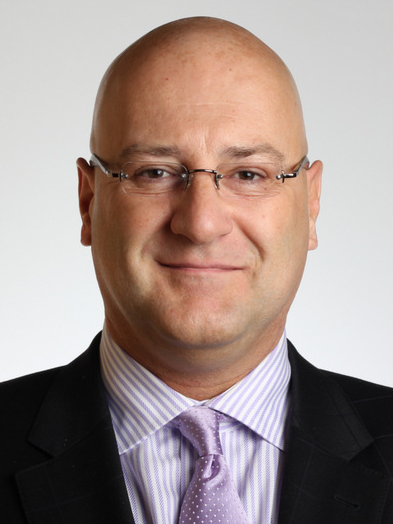
- Picard in June 2011

Parliamentary Secretary to the Minister of Public Safety and Emergency Preparedness
- In office December 2, 2015 – January 27, 2017
- Minister: Ralph Goodale
- Preceded by: Roxanne James
- Succeeded by: Mark Holland

Member of Parliament for Montarville
- In office October 19, 2015 – September 11, 2019
- Preceded by: district created
- Succeeded by: Stéphane Bergeron

Personal details
- Born: February 15, 1960 (age 66)
- Party: Liberal
- Education: Université Paris Ouest Nanterre La Défense; Université Laval

Michel Picard (born February 15, 1960) is a Canadian politician who served as the Member of Parliament for the riding of Montarville from 2015 until his defeat in the 2019 federal election as a member of the Liberal Party of Canada. During his tenure, he served as Parliamentary Secretary to the Minister of Public Safety and Emergency Preparedness.

== Electoral record ==
2019 Canadian federal election: Montarville
Party	Candidate	Votes	%	±%	Expenditures
Bloc Québécois	Stéphane Bergeron	25,366	42.8	+14.38	$22,609.89
Liberal	Michel Picard	21,061	35.6	+3.06	$55,495.41
New Democratic	Djaouida Sellah	4,984	8.4	-16.28	$1,715.58
Conservative	Julie Sauvageau	4,138	7.0	-3.85	$11,784.17
Green	Jean-Charles Pelland	2,967	5.0	+2.6	$3,869.64
People's	Julie Lavallée	501	0.8	–	none listed
Rhinoceros	Thomas Thibault-Vincent	211	0.4	–	$0.00
Total valid votes/expense limit		59,228	100		
Total rejected ballots		742			
Turnout		59,970	77.8%		
Eligible voters		77,097			
Bloc Québécois gain from Liberal		Swing		+5.66	
Source: Elections Canada

2015 Canadian federal election: Montarville
Party	Candidate	Votes	%	±%	Expenditures
Liberal	Michel Picard	18,848	32.54	+20.04	–
Bloc Québécois	Catherine Fournier	16,460	28.42	-0.66	–
New Democratic	Djaouida Sellah	14,296	24.68	-19.85	–
Conservative	Stéphane Duranleau	6,284	10.85	+1.25	–
Green	Olivier Adam	1,388	2.40	-0.05	–
Libertarian	Claude Leclair	641	1.11	–	–
Total valid votes/Expense limit		57,917	100.00		$207,758.92
Total rejected ballots		881	1.50	–	
Turnout		58,798	77.86	–	
Eligible voters		75,521			
Liberal notional gain from New Democratic		Swing		+19.94	
Source: Elections Canada

2011 Canadian federal election: Saint-Bruno—Saint-Hubert
Party	Candidate	Votes	%	±%	Expenditures
New Democratic	Djaouida Sellah	24,361	44.6	+31.1	
Bloc Québécois	Carole Lavallée	15,384	28.2	-16.8	
Liberal	Michel Picard	7,423	13.6	-8.6	
Conservative	Nicole Charbonneau Barron	5,887	10.8	-4.6	
Green	Germain Denoncourt	1,523	2.8	-1.0	
Total valid votes/Expense limit		54,578	100.0		
Total rejected ballots		780	1.4	0.0	
Turnout		55,358	67.5	-0.2	
Eligible voters		82,023	–	–	
