= Mont-Saint-Bruno—L'Acadie =

Federal electoral district in Quebec, Canada

Coordinates: 45°35′30″N 73°19′30″W

Quebec electoral district
- Interactive map of riding boundaries from the 2025 federal election

Federal electoral district
- Legislature: House of Commons
MP
Bienvenu-Olivier Ntumba
Liberal
- District created: 2013
- First contested: 2015
- Last contested: 2025
- District webpage: profile, map

Demographics
- Population (2016): 97,811
- Electors (2019): 77,097
- Area (km²): 158
- Pop. density (per km²): 619.1
- Census division(s): Longueuil, Marguerite-D'Youville, La Vallée-du-Richelieu
- Census subdivision(s): Longueuil (part), Sainte-Julie, Saint-Bruno-de-Montarville, Saint-Basile-le-Grand, Carignan (part)

Mont-Saint-Bruno—L'Acadie (formerly Montarville, French pronunciation: [mɔ̃taʁvil]) is a federal electoral district in the Montérégie region of Quebec, Canada, that has been represented in the House of Commons of Canada since 2015.

Montarville was created by the 2012 federal electoral boundaries redistribution and was legally defined in the 2013 representation order. It came into effect upon the call of the 2025 Canadian federal election. It was created out of parts of the electoral districts of Saint-Bruno—Saint-Hubert, Verchères—Les Patriotes and Chambly—Borduas.

The riding was renamed Mont-Saint-Bruno—L'Acadie by the 2023 representation order for Quebec. It gained Carignan from Beloeil—Chambly in the process.

== Profile ==
Similarly to other South Shore ridings, Montarville has recently become more of a competition between the Bloc Québécois and the Liberals despite an NDP win in 2011 and strong showing in 2015. The wealthier city of Saint-Bruno-de-Montarville tends to be more Liberal, while the Bloc performs better in Longueuil and Sainte-Julie.

== Demographics ==
According to the 2021 Canadian census, 2023 representation order

Racial groups: 88.0% White, 3.1% Black, 2.2% Latin American, 2.0% Arab, 1.1% Indigenous, 1.1% Chinese
Languages: 86.3% French, 6.5% English, 2.1% Spanish, 1.3% Arabic
Religions: 65.7% Christian (56.4% Catholic, 1.3% Christian Orthodox, 8.0% Other), 3.4% Muslim, 30.3% None
Median income: $51,200 (2020)
Average income: $64,300 (2020)

== Members of Parliament ==
This riding has elected the following members of Parliament:

Parliament	Years	Member	Party
Montarville; Riding created from Chambly—Borduas, Saint-Bruno—Saint-Hubert and Verchères—Les Patriotes
42nd	2015–2019	Michel Picard	Liberal
43rd	2019–2021	Stéphane Bergeron	Bloc Québécois
44th	2021–2025	Stéphane Bergeron	Bloc Québécois
Mont-Saint-Bruno—L'Acadie
45th	2025–present	Bienvenu-Olivier Ntumba	Liberal

== Election results ==
=== Mont-Saint-Bruno—L'Acadie ===
2025 Canadian federal election
Party	Candidate	Votes	%	±%	Expenditures
Liberal	Bienvenu-Olivier Ntumba	32,149	47.10	+12.99	$42,816.65
Bloc Québécois	Noémie Rouillard	23,947	35.09	–10.40	$44,328.48
Conservative	Nicolas Godin	9,335	13.68	+3.98	$2,081.73
New Democratic	Mirabelle Leins	1,590	2.33	–5.99	$0.00
Green	Maria Korpijaakko	833	1.22	+1.07	$0.00
People's	Patrick Rochon	397	0.58	–1.53	$0.00
Total valid votes/expenses limit		68,251	98.74	+0.46	$134,358.68
Total rejected ballots		871	1.26	–0.46	
Turnout		68,251	77.80	+4.06	
Eligible voters		88,845			
Liberal notional gain from Bloc Québécois		Swing		+11.69	
Source: Elections Canada

2021 federal election redistributed results
Party	Vote	%
Bloc Québécois	28,528	45.49
Liberal	21,397	34.12
Conservative	6,080	9.69
New Democratic	5,216	8.32
People's	1,322	2.11
Green	95	0.15
Free	51	0.08
Marijuana	14	0.02
Rhinoceros	10	0.02
Indépendance du Québec	6	0.01
Total valid votes	62,719	98.28
Rejected ballots	1,110	1.72
Registered voters/ estimated turnout	86,542	73.74

=== Montarville ===
2021 Canadian federal election: Montarville
Party	Candidate	Votes	%	±%	Expenditures
Bloc Québécois	Stéphane Bergeron	26,011	45.3	+2.5	$26,513.08
Liberal	Marie-Ève Pelchat	19,974	34.8	-0.8	$56,659.78
Conservative	Julie Sauvageau	5,460	9.5	+2.5	$4,343.53
New Democratic	Djaouida Sellah	4,809	8.4	±0.0	$596.30
People's	Natasha Hynes	1,218	2.1	+1.3	$1,269.78
Total valid votes/expense limit		57,472	98.2	–	$110,040.39
Total rejected ballots		1,033	1.8		
Turnout		58,505	74.7		
Eligible voters		78,273			
Bloc Québécois hold		Swing		+1.7	
Source: Elections Canada

2019 Canadian federal election: Montarville
Party	Candidate	Votes	%	±%	Expenditures
Bloc Québécois	Stéphane Bergeron	25,366	42.8	+14.38	$22,609.89
Liberal	Michel Picard	21,061	35.6	+3.06	$55,495.41
New Democratic	Djaouida Sellah	4,984	8.4	-16.28	$1,715.58
Conservative	Julie Sauvageau	4,138	7.0	-3.85	$11,784.17
Green	Jean-Charles Pelland	2,967	5.0	+2.6	$3,869.64
People's	Julie Lavallée	501	0.8	–	none listed
Rhinoceros	Thomas Thibault-Vincent	211	0.4	–	$0.00
Total valid votes/expense limit		59,228	100		
Total rejected ballots		742			
Turnout		59,970	77.8%		
Eligible voters		77,097			
Bloc Québécois gain from Liberal		Swing		+5.66	
Source: Elections Canada

2015 Canadian federal election
Party	Candidate	Votes	%	±%	Expenditures
Liberal	Michel Picard	18,848	32.54	+20.03	–
Bloc Québécois	Catherine Fournier	16,460	28.42	-0.66	–
New Democratic	Djaouida Sellah	14,296	24.68	-19.85	–
Conservative	Stéphane Duranleau	6,284	10.85	+1.25	–
Green	Olivier Adam	1,388	2.40	-0.05	–
Libertarian	Claude Leclair	641	1.11	–	–
Total valid votes/Expense limit		57,917	100.00		$207,758.92
Total rejected ballots		881	1.50	–	
Turnout		58,798	77.86	–	
Eligible voters		75,521			
Liberal gain from New Democratic		Swing		+19.94	
Source: Elections Canada

2011 federal election redistributed results
Party	Vote	%
New Democratic	23,227	44.53
Bloc Québécois	15,166	29.08
Liberal	6,524	12.51
Conservative	5,007	9.60
Green	1,278	2.45
Independent	959	1.84

== See also ==
- List of Canadian electoral districts
- Historical federal electoral districts of Canada
