= Bienvenu-Olivier Ntumba =

Canadian politician

Bienvenu-Olivier Ntumba MP

Member of Parliament for Mont-Saint-Bruno—L'Acadie
- Incumbent
- Assumed office April 28, 2025
- Preceded by: Stéphane Bergeron

Personal details
- Born: 1987 or 1988 (age 38–39) Zaire
- Party: Liberal

Bienvenu-Olivier Ntumba is a Canadian politician who has served as the member of Parliament for the riding of Mont-Saint-Bruno—L'Acadie as a member of the Liberal Party of Canada since 2025.

At the time of the 2025 Canadian federal election, he lived in Saint-Hubert, Quebec.
