= Pierrette Venne =

Canadian politician and lawyer

Pierrette Venne (born 8 August 1945 in Beauharnois, Quebec) was a member of the House of Commons of Canada from 1988 to 2003. By career, she is a lawyer.

Venne was elected in the Saint-Hubert electoral district as a member of the Progressive Conservative Party in the 1988 general election. The riding had been created from a restructuring of two ridings. She was re-elected in Saint-Hubert in the 1993 general election, and was also re-elected in 1997 and 2000 when the riding was renamed Saint-Bruno—Saint-Hubert. Her term of office would cover the 34th, 35th, 36th and 37th Canadian Parliaments.

She left the Conservatives to join the Bloc Québécois party on 12 August 1991. On 7 February 2003 she was ejected from the Bloc after she made critical comments about party leader Gilles Duceppe. Venne remained in Parliament until the end of her term after which she left politics.

== Electoral record ==
2000 Canadian federal election
Party	Candidate	Votes	%	±%
Bloc Québécois	Pierrette Venne	22,217	44.0%	-1.1%
Liberal	Claude Leblanc	19,743	39.1%	+6.3%
Alliance	Jean Vézina	3,305	6.5%	
Progressive Conservative	Otmane Brixi	2,673	5.3%	-14.8%
Marijuana	Maryève Daigle	1,546	3.1%	
New Democratic	Marie Henretta	1,029	2.0%	+0.1%
Total valid votes		50,513	100.0%	

1997 Canadian federal election
Party	Candidate	Votes	%	±%
Bloc Québécois	Pierrette Venne	23,759	45.1%	-11.5%
Liberal	Claude Leblanc	17,279	32.8%	+0.7%
Progressive Conservative	Camille Bolté	10,579	20.1%	+12.7%
New Democratic	Marie Henretta	1,032	2.0%	+0.5%
Total valid votes		52,649	100.0%	

1993 Canadian federal election: Saint-Bruno—Saint-Hubert
Party	Candidate	Votes	%	Expenditures
Bloc Québécois	Pierrette Venne	34,959	56.90	$35,450
Liberal	Angéline Fournier	19,615	31.92	$61,363
Progressive Conservative	Jean Lesage	4,520	7.36	$20,526
New Democratic	Nathalie Rochefort	903	1.47	$0
Natural Law	Jean Cerigo	868	1.41	$0
National	Claude Alain	339	0.55	$1,581
Commonwealth of Canada	Bruno Lipke	240	0.39	$0
Total valid votes		61,444	100.00	
Total rejected ballots		2,495		
Turnout		63,939	81.54	
Electors on the lists		78,418		
Source: Thirty-fifth General Election, 1993: Official Voting Results, Published by the Chief Electoral Officer of Canada. Financial figures taken from official contributions and expenses provided by Elections Canada.

1988 Canadian federal election
Party	Candidate	Votes	%
Progressive Conservative	Pierrette Venne	25,573	48.9%
Liberal	Raymond Dupont	15,209	29.1%
New Democratic	Nicole Desranleau	9,435	18.0%
Rhinoceros	Jean Nonobstant Thibault	1,222	2.3%
Green	Patricia Métivier	718	1.4%
Commonwealth of Canada	Jean-Sébastien Tremblay	132	0.3%
Total valid votes		52,289	100.0%

Parliament of Canada
Preceded by Chambly and La Prairie electoral districts	Member of Parliament from Saint-Bruno—Saint-Hubert; 1988–2004	Succeeded by Carole Lavallée, Bloc Québécois
