= Djaouida Sellah =

Canadian politician

Dr. Djaouida Sellah MD

Member of Parliament for Saint-Bruno—Saint-Hubert
- In office May 2, 2011 – August 4, 2015
- Preceded by: Carole Lavallée
- Succeeded by: Riding dissolved

Personal details
- Born: Algiers, Algeria
- Party: New Democratic Party
- Profession: Physician, Lecturer, Citizen Mediator

Djaouida Sellah (Arabic: دجويدا سيلاه) is a Canadian politician. Sellah represented the riding of Saint-Bruno—Saint-Hubert in the House of Commons from 2011 to 2015. Following her tenure in parliament, she served as president of the New Democratic Party of Quebec in 2018.

== Early life and career ==
Sellah was born in Algiers, Algeria. Her mother was a midwife and her father was killed in the Algerian War of Independence. She was a volunteer doctor for the Red Crescent during the Gulf War in Baghdad. She then went to Kuala Lumpur with her husband who was working as a translator. The two came to Quebec in 1998. Sellah has three children. At the time of her election, she was president of the Association québécoise des médecins diplômés hors Canada et États-Unis, supporting the recognition of qualifications of foreign-trained doctors.

== Political career ==
=== Federal politics ===
Sellah entered politics ahead of the 2011 Canadian federal election seeking the NDP nomination for Longueuil—Pierre-Boucher of which she lost to Pierre Nantel. She was then nominated by the party for the riding of Saint-Bruno—Saint-Hubert and was elected as part of the "Orange Wave" that swept Quebec, defeating three-term Bloc Québécois MP Carole Lavallée.

Sellah was the first Canadian politician elected who was born in Algeria.(NDP). In parliament, Sellah served on the Health Committee for the 1st session of the 41st Parliament, and she then served on the Standing Committee of the Status of Woment. She also served as the assistant Health Critic for the NDP from 2012 until 2013.

Sellah ran in the 2015 election in the new Riding of Montarville, but placed third behind Liberal Michel Picard, whom she had defeated in 2011. Sellah was once again the NDP's candidate for Montarville for the 2019 election; she came in third with a reduced percentage. She ran for the NDP again in the 2021 Election, but was unsuccessful.

=== Party politics ===
Following the death of Jack Layton, Sellah endorsed Tom Mulcair to be the next leader of the New Democratic Party. Sellah ran for president of the NDP in 2016 to replace Rebecca Blaikie, but ultimately lost to Marit Stiles. In the 2017 NDP leadership election, Sellah supported Charlie Angus.

=== Provincial politics ===
Sellah was the president of the New Democratic Party of Quebec during 2018. She was the New Democratic Party of Quebec's candidate in La Pinière for the 2018 Quebec general election.

== Electoral record ==
=== Federal ===
2025 Canadian federal election: Honoré-Mercier
Party	Candidate	Votes	%	±%	Expenditures
Liberal	Éric St-Pierre	29,947	60.16	+0.16	$79,172.08
Conservative	Ingrid Fernanda Megni	10,692	21.48	+10.94	$11,635.31
Bloc Québécois	Edline Henri	6,435	12.93	–3.35	$13,310.22
New Democratic	Djaouida Sellah	1,787	3.59	–3.73	$1,018.22
Green	Gaëtan Bérard	568	1.14	–0.36	$0.00
People's	Marie-Louise Beauchamp	351	0.71	–3.48	$0.00
Total valid votes		49,780	98.34	+0.31	$126,748.61
Total rejected ballots		838	1.66	–0.31	
Turnout		50,618	65.09		
Eligible voters		77,770			
Liberal notional hold		Swing		-5.39	
Source: Elections Canada
Note: number of eligible voters does not include voting day registrations.

2021 Canadian federal election: Montarville
Party	Candidate	Votes	%	±%	Expenditures
Bloc Québécois	Stéphane Bergeron	26,011	45.3	+2.5	$26,513.08
Liberal	Marie-Ève Pelchat	19,974	34.8	-0.8	$56,659.78
Conservative	Julie Sauvageau	5,460	9.5	+2.5	$4,343.53
New Democratic	Djaouida Sellah	4,809	8.4	±0.0	$596.30
People's	Natasha Hynes	1,218	2.1	+1.3	$1,269.78
Total valid votes/expense limit		57,472	98.2	–	$110,040.39
Total rejected ballots		1,033	1.8		
Turnout		58,505	74.7		
Eligible voters		78,273			
Bloc Québécois hold		Swing		+1.7	
Source: Elections Canada

2019 Canadian federal election: Montarville
Party	Candidate	Votes	%	±%	Expenditures
Bloc Québécois	Stéphane Bergeron	25,366	42.8	+14.38	$22,609.89
Liberal	Michel Picard	21,061	35.6	+3.06	$55,495.41
New Democratic	Djaouida Sellah	4,984	8.4	-16.28	$1,715.58
Conservative	Julie Sauvageau	4,138	7.0	-3.85	$11,784.17
Green	Jean-Charles Pelland	2,967	5.0	+2.6	$3,869.64
People's	Julie Lavallée	501	0.8	–	none listed
Rhinoceros	Thomas Thibault-Vincent	211	0.4	–	$0.00
Total valid votes/expense limit		59,228	100		
Total rejected ballots		742			
Turnout		59,970	77.8%		
Eligible voters		77,097			
Bloc Québécois gain from Liberal		Swing		+5.66	
Source: Elections Canada

2015 Canadian federal election
Party	Candidate	Votes	%	±%	Expenditures
Liberal	Michel Picard	18,848	32.54	+20.03	–
Bloc Québécois	Catherine Fournier	16,460	28.42	-0.66	–
New Democratic	Djaouida Sellah	14,296	24.68	-19.85	–
Conservative	Stéphane Duranleau	6,284	10.85	+1.25	–
Green	Olivier Adam	1,388	2.40	-0.05	–
Libertarian	Claude Leclair	641	1.11	–	–
Total valid votes/Expense limit		57,917	100.00		$207,758.92
Total rejected ballots		881	1.50	–	
Turnout		58,798	77.86	–	
Eligible voters		75,521			
Liberal gain from New Democratic		Swing		+19.94	
Source: Elections Canada

2011 Canadian federal election
Party	Candidate	Votes	%	±%	Expenditures
New Democratic	Djaouida Sellah	24,361	44.6	+31.1	$3,406.84
Bloc Québécois	Carole Lavallée	15,384	28.2	-16.8	$83,400.22
Liberal	Michel Picard	7,423	13.6	-8.6	$42,960.83
Conservative	Nicole Charbonneau Barron	5,887	10.8	-4.6	$19,838.46
Green	Germain Denoncourt	1,523	2.8	-1.0	$3,017.79
Total valid votes/Expense limit		54,578	100.0		
Total rejected ballots		780	1.4	0.0	
Turnout		55,358	67.5	-0.2	
Eligible voters		82,023	–	–	

=== Provincial ===
2018 Quebec general election: La Pinière
Party	Candidate	Votes	%	±%
Liberal	Gaétan Barrette	15,476	47.07	-11.22
Coalition Avenir Québec	Sylvia Baronian	9,480	28.83	+16.25
Québec solidaire	Marie Pagès	3,300	10.04	+6.16
Parti Québécois	Suzanne Gagnon	2,921	8.88	-15.6
Green	Aziza Dini	585	1.78	-0.13
Conservative	Anwar El Youbi	435	1.32	+0.66
New Democratic	Djaouida Sellah	354	1.08	
Independent	Patrick Hayes	168	0.51	
Independent	Fang Hu	161	0.49	
Total valid votes		32,880	98.69	
Total rejected ballots		435	1.31	
Turnout		33,315	61.09	
Eligible voters		54,534		
Liberal hold		Swing		-13.735
Source(s) "Rapport des résultats officiels du scrutin". Élections Québec.
