= Saint-Bruno—Saint-Hubert =

Former federal electoral district in Quebec, Canada

Coordinates: 45.521°N 73.386°W

Quebec electoral district
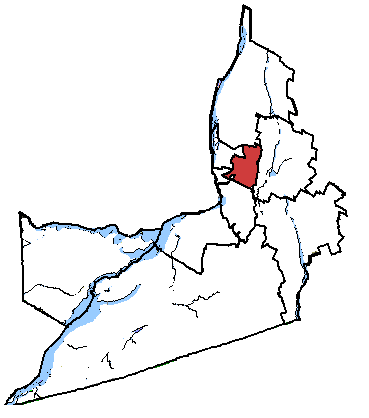
- Saint-Bruno—Saint-Hubert in relation to other Montérégie federal electoral districts
- District created: 1987
- District abolished: 2012
- First contested: 1988
- Last contested: 2011
- District webpage: profile, map

Demographics
- Population (2011): 105,532
- Electors (2011): 79,183
- Area (km²): 109.25
- Census subdivision(s): Longueuil, Saint-Bruno-de-Montarville

Saint-Bruno—Saint-Hubert (formerly known as Saint-Hubert) was a federal electoral district in Quebec, Canada, that was represented in the House of Commons of Canada from 1988 to 2015. Its population in 2001 was 99,755.

== Geography ==
This South Shore district in the Quebec region of Montérégie included the former Towns of Saint-Bruno-de-Montarville and Saint-Hubert in the city of Longueuil.

The neighbouring ridings were Saint-Lambert, Longueuil—Pierre-Boucher, Verchères—Les Patriotes, Chambly—Borduas, and Brossard—La Prairie.

== History ==
The electoral district of "Saint-Hubert" was created in 1987 from parts of Chambly and La Prairie ridings.

Saint-Hubert initially consisted of the towns of Greenfield Park, Lemoyne and Saint-Hubert, and part of the Town of Longueuil. In 1996, the riding was redefined to consist of the cities of Saint-Bruno-de-Montarville and Saint-Hubert.

The name of the riding was changed to "Saint-Bruno—Saint-Hubert" in 1997.

It was abolished for the 2015 election.

=== Members of Parliament ===
This riding has elected the following members of Parliament:

Parliament	Years	Member	Party
Saint-Hubert; Riding created from Chambly and La Prairie
34th	1988–1991	Pierrette Venne	Progressive Conservative
34th	1991–1993	Pierrette Venne	Bloc Québécois
35th	1993–1997	Pierrette Venne	Bloc Québécois
Saint-Bruno—Saint-Hubert
36th	1997–2000	Pierrette Venne	Bloc Québécois
37th	2000–2003	Pierrette Venne	Bloc Québécois
37th	2003–2004	Pierrette Venne	Independent Bloc Québécois
38th	2004–2006	Carole Lavallée	Bloc Québécois
39th	2006–2008	Carole Lavallée	Bloc Québécois
40th	2008–2011	Carole Lavallée	Bloc Québécois
41st	2011–2015	Djaouida Sellah	New Democratic
Riding dissolved into Montarville, Longueuil—Charles-LeMoyne and Longueuil—Saint-Hubert

== Election results ==
=== Saint-Bruno—Saint-Hubert, 1997-present ===
2011 Canadian federal election
Party	Candidate	Votes	%	±%	Expenditures
New Democratic	Djaouida Sellah	24,361	44.6	+31.1	$3,406.84
Bloc Québécois	Carole Lavallée	15,384	28.2	-16.8	$83,400.22
Liberal	Michel Picard	7,423	13.6	-8.6	$42,960.83
Conservative	Nicole Charbonneau Barron	5,887	10.8	-4.6	$19,838.46
Green	Germain Denoncourt	1,523	2.8	-1.0	$3,017.79
Total valid votes/expense limit		54,578	100.0		
Total rejected ballots		780	1.4	0.0	
Turnout		55,358	67.5	-0.2	
Eligible voters		82,023	–	–	

2008 Canadian federal election
Party	Candidate	Votes	%	±%	Expenditures
Bloc Québécois	Carole Lavallée	23,767	45.0	-5.3	$83,155
Liberal	Pierre Diamond	11,755	22.2	+5.9	$14,457
Conservative	Nicole Charbonneau Barron	8,125	15.4	-4.4	$28,611
New Democratic	Vesna Vesic	7,154	13.5	+5.3	$2,129
Green	Simon Bernier	2,031	3.8	-0.6	$1.95
Total valid votes/expense limit		52,832	100.0	$84,917	
Total rejected ballots		774	1.4		
Turnout		53,606	67.7		

2006 Canadian federal election
Party	Candidate	Votes	%	±%	Expenditures
Bloc Québécois	Carole Lavallée	26,509	50.3	-4.8	$68,980
Conservative	Nicolas Waldteufel	10,451	19.8	+13.6	$6,475
Liberal	Kerline Joseph	8,643	16.4	-14.0	$23,638
New Democratic	Marie Henretta	4,359	8.3	+3.8	$3,000
Green	Elisabeth Papin	2,364	4.5	+1.8	$202
Independent	Jules Édouard Gaudet	387	0.7	–	
Total valid votes/expense limit		52,713	100.0	$79,580	

2004 Canadian federal election
Party	Candidate	Votes	%	±%	Expenditures
Bloc Québécois	Carole Lavallée	28,050	55.1	+11.1	$69,164
Liberal	Marc Savard	15,457	30.4	-8.7	$67,203
Conservative	Jean-François Mongeau	3,189	6.3	-5.6	$12,521
New Democratic	Marie Henretta	2,253	4.4	+2.4	$1,694
Green	Janis Crawford	1,349	2.7	–	
Marijuana	David Vachon	596	1.2	-1.9	
Total valid votes/expense limit		50,894	100.0	$78,136	

Note: Conservative vote is compared to the total of the Canadian Alliance vote and Progressive Conservative vote in 2000 election.

2000 Canadian federal election
Party	Candidate	Votes	%	±%
Bloc Québécois	Pierrette Venne	22,217	44.0	-1.1
Liberal	Claude Leblanc	19,743	39.1	+6.3
Alliance	Jean Vézina	3,305	6.5	
Progressive Conservative	Otmane Brixi	2,673	5.3	-14.8
Marijuana	Maryève Daigle	1,546	3.1	
New Democratic	Marie Henretta	1,029	2.0	+0.1
Total valid votes		50,513	100.0	

=== Saint-Hubert, 1987-1997 ===
1997 Canadian federal election
Party	Candidate	Votes	%	±%
Bloc Québécois	Pierrette Venne	23,759	45.1	-11.5
Liberal	Claude Leblanc	17,279	32.8	+0.7
Progressive Conservative	Camille Bolté	10,579	20.1	+12.7
New Democratic	Marie Henretta	1,032	2.0	+0.5
Total valid votes		52,649	100.0	

1993 Canadian federal election
Party	Candidate	Votes	%	±%
Bloc Québécois	Pierrette Venne	34,701	56.6	
Liberal	Angéline Fournier	19,668	32.1	+3.0
Progressive Conservative	Jean Lesage	4,545	7.4	-41.5
New Democratic	Nathalie Rochefort	904	1.5	-16.6
Natural Law	Jean Cerigo	863	1.4	
National	Claude K. Alain	339	0.6	
Commonwealth of Canada	Bruno Lipke	269	0.4	+0.2
Total valid votes		61,289	100.0	

1988 Canadian federal election
Party	Candidate	Votes	%
Progressive Conservative	Pierrette Venne	25,573	48.9
Liberal	Raymond Dupont	15,209	29.1
New Democratic	Nicole Desranleau	9,435	18.0
Rhinoceros	Jean Nonobstant Thibault	1,222	2.3
Green	Patricia Métivier	718	1.4
Commonwealth of Canada	Jean-Sébastien Tremblay	132	0.3
Total valid votes		52,289	100.0

== See also ==
- List of Canadian electoral districts
- Historical federal electoral districts of Canada

== Sources ==
- "Saint-Bruno—Saint-Hubert (Code 24062) Census Profile". 2011 census. Government of Canada - Statistics Canada.
- Campaign expense data from Elections Canada

Riding history from the Library of Parliament:

- Saint-Hubert
- Saint-Bruno—Saint-Hubert
- 2011 Results from Elections Canada
