= Carole Lavallée =

Canadian politician (1954–2021)

Member of the Canadian Parliament for Saint-Bruno—Saint-Hubert
- In office 2004–2011
- Preceded by: Pierrette Venne
- Succeeded by: Djaouida Sellah

Personal details
- Born: January 23, 1954 Montreal, Quebec
- Died: March 26, 2021 (aged 67)
- Party: Bloc Québécois
- Profession: Businesswoman, communications consultant, journalist

Carole Lavallée (January 23, 1954 – March 26, 2021) was a Canadian politician.

== Biography ==
Lavallée was born in Montreal, Quebec. A businesswoman, communication consultant, communicator, and a journalist, she was first elected to the House of Commons of Canada in the 2004 Canadian federal election. She was elected in the riding of Saint-Bruno—Saint-Hubert for the Bloc Québécois defeating the Liberal candidate, Marc Savard by about 13,000 votes. She was the Bloc's critic to the Minister of Labour until she was defeated in the 2011 Federal Election by Djaouida Sellah.
