= Massue =

Massue is a surname. Notable people with the surname include:

- Aignan-Aimé Massue (1781–1866), seigneur and political figure in Lower Canada
- Louis Massue (1786–1869), businessman and political figure in Canada East
- Joseph-Aimé Massue (1860–1891), seigneur and political figure in Quebec
- Louis Huet Massue (1828–1891), farmer, seigneur, and political figure in Quebec
- Melville Henry Massue (1868–1921), British genealogist and author
