= Joseph Perrault =

Joseph Perrault may refer to:

- Joseph Perrault (architect) (1866–1923), Canadian architect
- Joseph Perrault (Lower Canada politician) (1789–1831)

== See also ==
- Joseph-Édouard Perrault (1874–1948), Canadian lawyer and political figure
- Joseph-François Perrault (1753–1844), businessman and political figure in Lower Canada
- Joseph-Stanislas Perrault (1846–1907), lawyer and political figure in Quebec
- Joseph-Xavier Perrault (1836–1905), Quebec educator and political figure
- Joe Perrault
