= Jean-Baptiste Brousseau =

Canadian politician

Member of the Legislative Assembly of Quebec for Verchères
- In office 1878–1879
- Preceded by: Joseph Daigle
- Succeeded by: Achille Larose

Personal details
- Born: January 2, 1841 Saint-Mathieu de Beloeil, Lower Canada
- Died: June 21, 1925 (aged 84) Sorel, Quebec
- Party: Liberal

Jean-Baptiste Brousseau (January 2, 1841 – June 21, 1925) was a lawyer, journalist and political figure in Quebec. He represented Verchères in the Legislative Assembly of Quebec from 1878 to 1879 as a Liberal.

He was born in Saint-Mathieu de Beloeil, Lower Canada, the son of Jean-Baptiste Brousseau and Marie-Anne-Charlotte Hertel de Rouville who was the daughter of seigneur Jean-Baptiste-René Hertel de Rouville, and was educated at the Collège de Saint-Hyacinthe and the Collège de l'Assomption. He articled in law with Louis Bélanger and Lewis Thomas Drummond and was called to the Lower Canada bar in 1863. In 1864, he married Marie Eulalie Malot. Brousseau served as Crown Prosecutor for Richelieu district from 1871 to 1874. He was editor for the Messager de Sorel and was, with Georges-Isidore Barthe, co-editor for the La Gazette de Sorel. His election in 1878 was overturned in the following year and he did not run in the subsequent by-election. In 1899, he was named Queen's Counsel. Brousseau died in Sorel at the age of 84.

His uncle Joseph Daigle also represented Verchères in the Quebec assembly.
