= Arthur Cardin =

Canadian politician

The Honourable Arthur Cardin PC
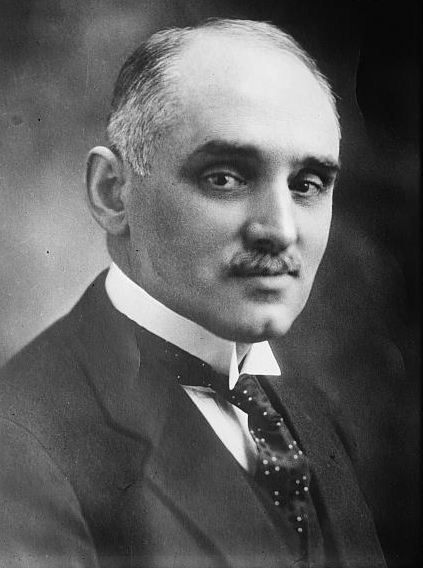

Member of the Canadian Parliament for Richelieu—Verchères
- In office 1935–1946
- Preceded by: District was created in 1933
- Succeeded by: Gérard Cournoyer

Member of the Canadian Parliament for Richelieu
- In office 1911–1935
- Preceded by: Adélard Lanctôt
- Succeeded by: District was abolished in 1933

Personal details
- Born: Pierre-Joseph-Arthur Cardin; June 28, 1879 Sorel, Quebec, Canada
- Died: October 20, 1946 (aged 67)
- Party: Liberal

Pierre-Joseph-Arthur Cardin, PC (June 28, 1879 – October 20, 1946) also known as Arthur Cardin was a Canadian politician who quit the cabinet of William Lyon Mackenzie King over the issue of conscription.

Born in Sorel, Quebec, he was a lawyer before being elected to the House of Commons of Canada for the riding of Richelieu in the 1911 federal election. A Liberal, he was re-elected in every election he contested in Richelieu and, beginning in 1935, Richelieu—Verchères. He held four ministerial positions: Minister of Marine and Fisheries, Minister of Marine, Minister of Public Works, and Minister of Transport.

Cardin called for a "Yes" vote in the 1942 plebiscite to release the King government's from its pledge not to introduce conscription but resigned from Cabinet in May 1942 over the introduction of the National Resources Mobilization Act which gave the government the authority to do so when Mackenzie King was prepared to enable conscription through an Order in Council, although he had previously promised to seek a motion of confidence before bringing in mandatory military service.

In April 1942, Cardin announced that he would be leading a slate of candidates in the June 1945 federal election most of whom were former Liberals who had left the party over the issue of conscription. The party, which won the support of the "Independent Group" of Quebec MPs led by Frédéric Dorion was to be known as the National Front and was considered more moderate than the Bloc populaire canadien. Among its policies was opposition to the "socialism" the Mackenzie King government had introduced during the war, continued opposition to conscription, and bringing about greater national unity in Canada based on equality between French and English Canadians. However, in May Cardin abandoned his plans for a new party on May 8, 1945, declaring his desire to use the new party to bring about the "unity and equality" of both the province and the country as "an illusion", due to the failure of the more radical Bloc populaire canadien and other nationalists to join his movement and unite behind his leadership. One serious problem for Cardin was hostility towards him from former Montreal mayor Camillien Houde who had been interned during the war for his opposition to conscription and was attempting to lead his own group of candidates in the 1945 election. Houde held Cardin, who had been a member of Cabinet at the time of Houde's arrest, responsible for the decision to intern him. Cardin instead ran and was re-elected to parliament as an independent candidate. He died the next year in 1946.

Cardin Mountain, later adjusted to Mount Cardin, in British Columbia is named in his honour.

== Electoral record ==
1911 Canadian federal election: Richelieu
Party	Candidate	Votes
Liberal	Arthur Cardin	2,373
Conservative	Arthur Pierre Vanasse	1,639

By-election: On election being declared void, 29 April 1912

By-election on 24 October 1912
Party	Candidate	Votes
Liberal	Arthur Cardin	2,154
Conservative	E. A. D. Morgan	1,896

1917 Canadian federal election: Richelieu
Party	Candidate	Votes
Opposition (Laurier Liberals)	Arthur Cardin	3,355
Government (Unionist)	Edward André "D." Morgan	834

1921 Canadian federal election: Richelieu
Party	Candidate	Votes
Liberal	Arthur Cardin	4,706
Conservative	William George Marcellin Morgan	2,044

By-election: On Mr. Cardin's acceptance of an office of emolument under the Crown, 30 January 1924

By-election on 27 February 1924
Party	Candidate	Votes
Liberal	Arthur Cardin	acclaimed

1925 Canadian federal election: Richelieu
Party	Candidate	Votes
Liberal	Arthur Cardin	4,562
Conservative	William Georges Marcellin Morgan	2,565

1926 Canadian federal election: Richelieu
Party	Candidate	Votes
Liberal	Arthur Cardin	4,893
Conservative	Aimé Chassé	2,927

By-election: On Mr. Cardin's acceptance of an office of emolument under the Crown, 5 October 1926

By-election on 2 November 1926
Party	Candidate	Votes
Liberal	Arthur Cardin	acclaimed

1930 Canadian federal election: Richelieu
Party	Candidate	Votes
Liberal	Arthur Cardin	5,644
Conservative	Joseph-Louis-Alphonse L'Heureux	3,236
Source: lop.parl.ca

== See also ==
- Jehovah's Witnesses in Canada
