= Aignan-Aimé Massue =

Canadian politician

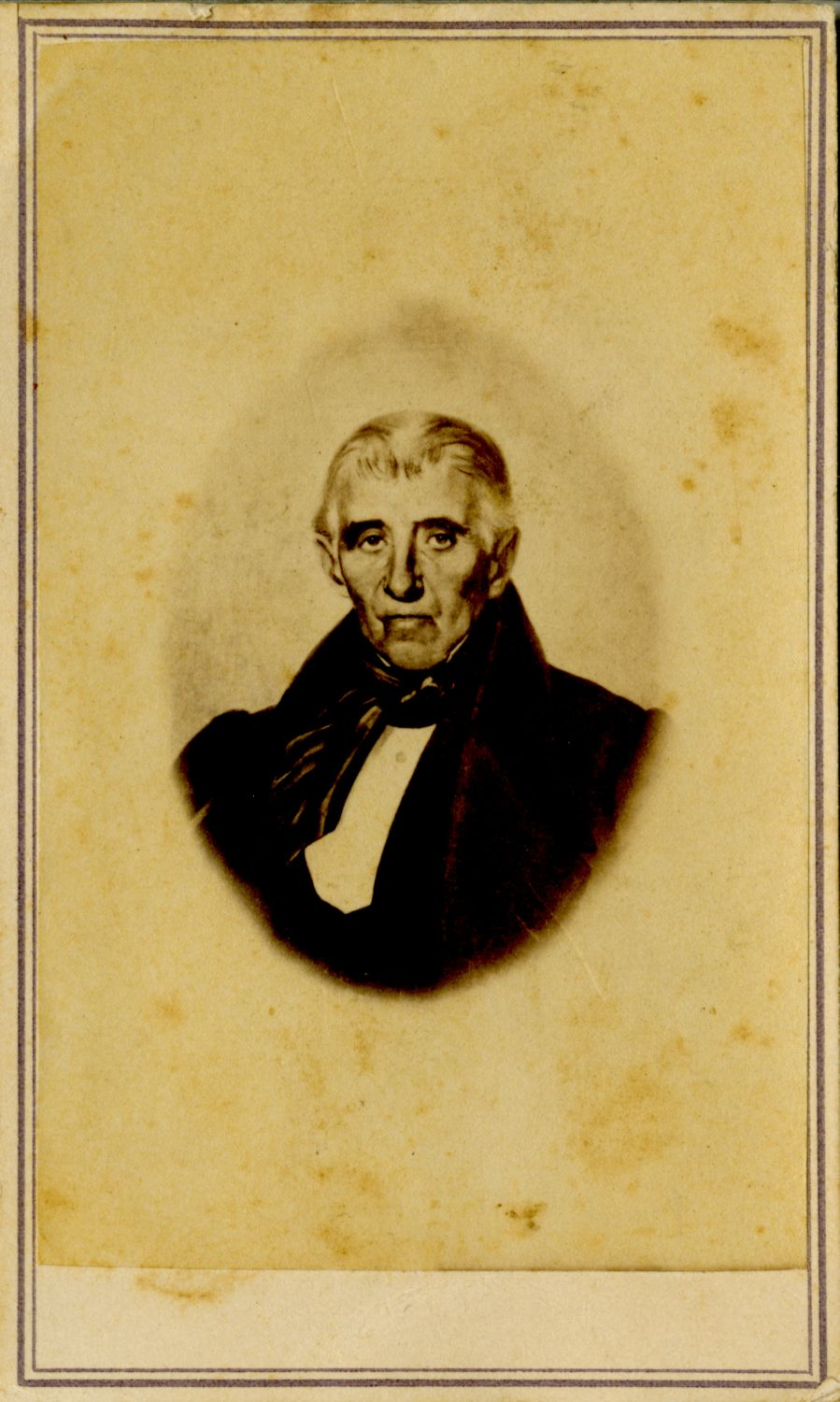
Deputy Aimé Massue, 1825

Aignan-Aimé Massue (October 1781 – February 1, 1866) was a seigneur and political figure in Lower Canada. He represented Surrey in the Legislative Assembly of Lower Canada from 1824 to 1827 as a supporter of the Parti patriote.

He was born in Varennes, Province of Quebec, the son of Gaspard Massue, co-seigneur of Varennes, and Josephte Huet Dulude. He entered into business in partnership with his brother-in-law Étienne Duchesnois, later establishing his own business. He acquired four fiefs along the Yamaska River: Saint-Charles, Bonsecours, Bourchemin and Bourg-Marie-Ouest. Massue was married twice: to Celeste Richard in 1811 and to Suzanne-Éléonore Perrault in 1842. Massue resigned his seat in 1827 to allow Louis-Joseph Papineau to be elected in Surrey. He was named a justice of the peace in 1830 and commissioner for the trial of minor causes in 1837. Massue did not support the Lower Canada Rebellion. He died in Varennes at the age of 84.

His son Louis Huet Massue and a grandson Joseph-Aimé Massue both served in the House of Commons. His brother Louis Massue served as a member of the Legislative Council for the Province of Canada.
