= Joseph Daigle =

Joseph Daigle may refer to:

- Joseph Daigle (New Brunswick politician) (born 1934)
- Joseph Daigle (Quebec politician) (1846–1907)
