= Marie-Marguerite d'Youville =

French Canadian saint (1701–1771)

Saint Marie-Marguerite d'Youville SGM
- Marguerite d'Youville, foundress of the Grey Nuns

Saint and Mother of universal charity
- Born: Marie-Marguerite Dufrost de Lajemmerais; October 15, 1701; Varennes, Canada, New France
- Died: December 23, 1771 (aged 70); Montreal, Province of Quebec, British North America
- Venerated in: Catholic Church
- Beatified: May 3, 1959, Saint Peter's Basilica, Vatican City, by Pope John XXIII
- Canonized: December 9, 1990, Saint Peter's Basilica, Vatican City, by Pope John Paul II
- Feast: October 16
- Attributes: Religious habit

Marguerite d'Youville (French pronunciation: [maʁɡʁit djuvil]), born Marie-Marguerite Dufrost de Lajemmerais (October 15, 1701 – December 23, 1771) is a French Canadian nun who founded the Sisters of Charity of Montreal, commonly known as the Grey Nuns, one of the first religious congregations founded in Canada. One of the pionneers of community service in New France, she administered during the later part of her life the Montreal General Hospital. She was canonized by Pope John Paul II in 1990, becoming the first catholic saint born in Canada.

== Biography ==
=== Childhood and early life ===
Marguerite d'Youville was born in Varennes, near Montreal, on October 15, 1701. She was the eldest daughter of François-Christophe Dufrost de Lajemmerais, a minor noble from Britanny who arrived in New France around 1687 as an officer in the Compagnies franches de la Marine. Her mother, Marie-Renée Gaultier de Varennes, was also a noble. Marguerite's maternal grandparents were René Gaultier de Varennes, governor of Trois-Rivières between 1668 and 1689, and Marie Boucher, the daughter of Pierre Boucher, the founder of Boucherville, who also had served as governor of Trois-Rivières.

Marguerite's father died at the Hotel-Dieu of Montreal in 1708, when she was only seven years old. His death left her mother in a difficult financial situation. Thanks to her family connections, however, Marguerite received a good education in Quebec, at the Ursuline convent, where she stayed between 1712 and 1714. She subsequently returned to live in Varennes with her mother, until her second marriage to Timothée Silvain (born Timothy Sullivan), an Irish military officer and surgeon who had arrived in New France around 1718. This unhappy marriage was frowned upon by Marguerite's family. Timothée Silvain was appointed as a royal physician in 1724, with the support of both governor Pierre de Rigaud de Vaudreuil and another royal physician, Michel Sarrazin. He practiced for a time at the Hôtel-Dieu in Montréal. Until his death in 1749, he had numerous run-ins with colonial authorities.

=== Marriage with François-Madeleine d'Youville ===
In 1721, Marguerite followed her mother and stepfather to Montreal, where she was, for a time, courted by the son of an officer in the Compagnies franches de la Marine, Louis-Hector Piot de Langloiserie. She eventually met François-Madeline d'Youville, the son of a wealthy merchant, whom she wed on August 12, 1722. François-Madeline and his family were well-known to colonial authorities. They had been the subject of several complaints for having violated the prohibitions against trading fur for brandy with the First Nations. Some members of François-Madeleine's family, himself included, as well of others from Marguerite's were also involved in the slave trade. Owning slaves was then common among merchants and nobles.

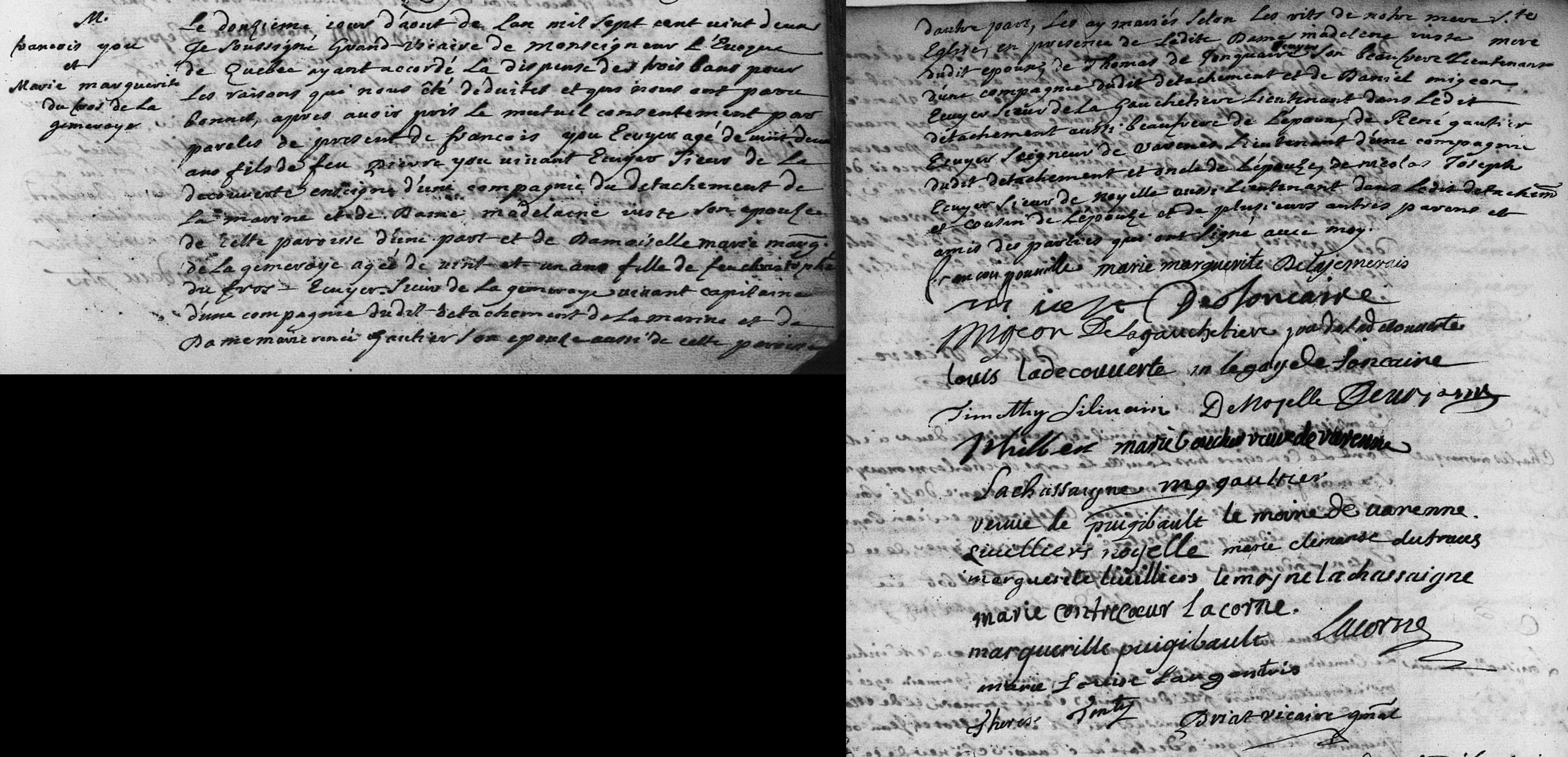
Marguerite and François-Madeleine's marriage certificate

Together, the couple had six children, of which only two survived into adulthood : Joseph-François (1724-1778) and Charles-Marie-Madeleine (1729-1790). Around 1727, Marguerite experienced a moral crisis caused by her unsatisfying family life. Her biographers would later allude to her husband's infidelity. François-Madeleine was often away, and his business dealings seemed problematic to her. Three years later, in July 1730, he suddenly died at the Hôtel-Dieu following a brief illness, leaving Marguerite with substantial debts. She also inherited his three slaves. To ensure her survival and that of her two children, she ran a small merchandise business in the years that followed, where she demonstrated considerable talents as an administrator.

=== Foundation of the Sisters of Charity of Montreal ===
After her husband's death, Marguerite's piety deepened significantly. She was guided by two spiritual directors, the sulpicians Jean-Gabriel-Marie Le Pape Du Lescoät, who had been advising her since 1727, and Louis Normant du Faradon, who had succeeded him in 1733. Marguerite had already been practicing devotion to the Sacred Heart since her time with the Ursulines in Quebec. She then joined several catholic confraternities, such as those of the Holy Family and the Good Death, and began to devote herself particularly to the Eternal Father. Membership in such lay confraternities was at the time encouraged by the colonial clergy. Over the years, she held several positions within the Confraternity of the Holy Family, including those of councilor, instructor of postulants, superior and treasurer.

It was in this context that Marguerite began to think about charity works, which was then a common aspiration among noblewomen in France who, since the Counter-Reformation, had begun to take on a more active role in religious life. Many also supported charitable organizations. This was the case, for example, with Marie-Madeleine de Vignerot and Angélique Faure de Bullion who had, without leaving France, supported the activities of the Hôtel-Dieu of Quebec and the Hôtel-Dieu of Montreal, respectively.

Engraving of Marguerite d'Youville and the first Grey Nuns receiving their habits (1854)

For Marguerite, however, this desire went much further, as she wanted to devote herself to helping the poor. This is eventually what she did in 1737, in agreement with her spiritual director, when she welcomed in her home Françoise Auzon, an elderly, blind widow who could not be admitted to the Charron Brother's General Hospital, an institution founded at the end of the 17^{th} century which was still reserved for men. Towards the end of 1737, three other women - Marie-Louise Thaumur de La Source, Catherine Cusson and Marie-Catherine Demers Dessermont, joined Marguerite in her home. On December 31, in secret and without King Louis XV's approval, the four women took their religious vows. This date is considered by the Grey Nuns to be the official founding of their congregation. The next day, the four sisters adopted their first religious rule, which they wrote on loose sheets of paper.

In October 1738, Marguerite, her fellow sisters and their boarders moved into a larger building on Notre-Dame street, the Le Verrier House, which they rented using funds raised through various manual labors such as sewing. The Sulpicians also intended to entrust to them the management of the General Hospital, which was then facing major financial difficulties. The project fell through because of the opposition of several prominent Montrealers, including the city's governor, Josué Dubois Berthelot de Beaucours, several military officers and merchants, some of whom were even relatives of Marguerite.

To express their opposition, they had written to Jean-Frédéric Phélypeaux de Maurepas, Louis XV's Secretary of State of the Navy, who was responsible for the colonies. This opposition can be partly explained by the close ties between the Grey Nuns and the Sulpicians, who were sometimes at odds with the rest of the clergy in New France and, as seigneurs of Montreal, with its residents. The inhabitants of Montreal thus did not held in high regards the new religious community.

=== Health problems and new religious vows ===
The Grey Nuns' Engagements primitifs (1745)

Around that period, Marguerite started experiencing serious health issues. She suffered from a knee ailment that could not be treated and that persisted until 1745. These were exacerbated by the fatigue caused by her efforts to ensure the survival of the small congregation. During their early years, the Grey Nuns nevertheless slowly grew. In February 1741, one of the founders, Catherine Cusson, died of tuberculosis. She was replaced a few months later by Catherine de Rainville. In 1744, Thérèse Laserre-Laforme arrived at the Le Verrier house, which was destroyed during a fire on January 31, 1745. Two days after the blaze, the Grey Nuns signed informal vows of submission, obedience and detachment which had been drafted with the help of the Sulpician Louis Normant du Faradon. This document, called Engagements primitifs, or "Original commitments", would later be incorporated into the Grey Nuns' official constitutions in 1781.

=== Renewal of the General Hospital ===
The fire of 1745 and the signing of the Engagements primitifs helped solidify the Grey Nuns' place in Montreal's society, which began to view the congregation in a more positive light. After the fire, the sisters and their boarders temporarily moved into a small house on Saint-Paul Street lent to them by the merchant Jacques Quesnel. They later rented a larger house on Notre-Dame Street, near the church of the Recollects, but had to move again because the governor of Montreal opposed the transaction. The congregation then moved for a time into a house given to them by Elisabeth Chapts de La Corne, a daughter of Claude de Ramezay, former governor of New France. The sisters moved one last time into a large house rented from another merchant, Paul-Alexandre d'Ailleboust, which was located on the Place d'Armes. During their numerous relocations, three new sisters joined the congregation.

Painting of the Grey Nuns' General Hospital by Henry Richard S. Bunnett (ca 1885-1889)

In 1746, Henri-Marie du Breil de Pontbriand, Bishop of Quebec, was already considering entrusting General Hospital to the Grey Nuns' care. The institution, founded in 1692 by François Charon de La Barre, was then administered by the Brothers of the Cross and Saint Joseph. It was at that time in a state of disrepair and burdened by heavy debts. By 1747, it housed only two brothers who were caring for sixteen boarders. Under their management, the hospital had accumulated debts of nearly 49,000 livres.

In August 1747, Marguerite provisionally accepted responsibility for the General Hospital. The colonial authorities however remained reluctant, fearing that the Grey Nuns would be unable to shoulder the financial responsibilities of the institution. Furthermore, ten years after its informal founding, the congregation had still not been approved by Louis XV or by the Church. This did not prevent the hospital's expansion which, soon after the Grey Nuns' takeover, opened its door to women, disabled soldiers and even prostitutes. It also welcomed slaves abandoned by their masters, most of whom were sick, disabled, or at the end of their lives. Wealthy laywomen also came there to live as paying residents.

=== Official recognition of the Grey Nuns ===
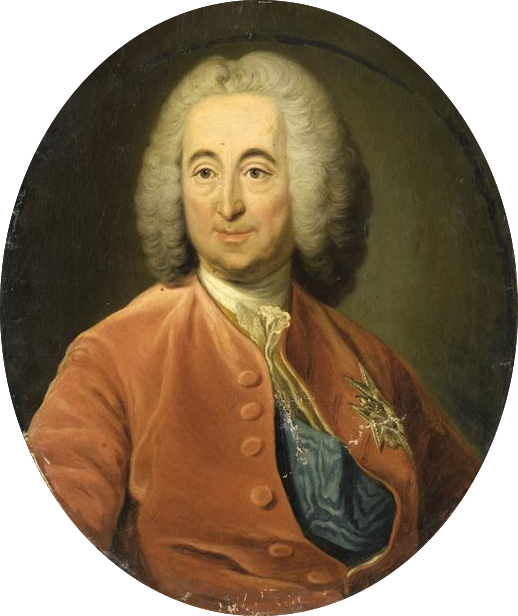
Antoine-Louis Rouillé, count of Jouy, Louis XV's Secretary of State of the Navy

A skilled administrator, Marguerite managed within a few years to restore the General Hospital's finances and condition, after which she set out to convince the King of the merits of her congregation. To that end, she sent a letter to Pierre de La Rue, Vicar General of Canada and of the Acadian Missions. In this endeavor, she benefited from the support of the Sulpicians, and, for a time, that of Bishop de Pontbriand, who, as early as 1748, recognized the benefits of her administration. However, during the fall of 1748, the new Intendant of New France, François Bigot, considered entrusting the hospital to the care of the Religious Hospitallers of Saint Joseph, who were in charge of the Hôtel-Dieu of Montreal. Ultimately, the 1747 ordinance was revoked in 1750, when the Intendant, together with the Bishop of Quebec, ordered the merger of the General Hospital of Montreal with the one in Quebec, which was administered by the Canonesses of St. Augustine of the Mercy of Jesus.

Marguerite d'Youville's correspondance (16 February 1751)

Marguerite d'Youville vigorously opposed this decree. This time, she had not only the support of the Society of Saint-Sulpice, whose superior, Jean Couturier, interceded with the King, but also that of several prominent Montrealers, including governor Charles III Le Moyne, who wrote to the Secretary of State of the Navy, Antoine-Louis Rouillé, count of Jouy, on behalf of the Grey Nuns. Unlike in 1738, the people of Montreal were this time on the sisters' side. Marguerite also drafted a proposal in which she outlined the improvements made to the General Hospital since the Grey Nuns' takeover in 1747. She further pledged to pay off the remaining debts of the institution and even traveled in person to Quebec to deliver her petition to the Bishop and the Intendant, with whom she subsequently exchanged numerous letters in order to defend her position.

Marguerite d'Youville and the Grey Nuns' efforts finally paid off. In December 1751, following the intervention of the Secretary of State of the Navy, Intendant Bigot revoked the 1750 ordinance. In May 1752, Louis XV ordered that a contract be drawn up with the Grey Nuns to establish the terms for the administration of the General Hospital. In response to this decision, Marguerite submitted a memorandum to the colony's authorities in which she detailed the measures she intended to take to definitively settle the institution's debts. In it, she also requested rights and privileges equivalent to those enjoyed by the Brothers of the Cross and Saint Joseph.

The contract was formalized by an ordinance in September 1752 and in June 1753, Louis XV officially recognized the existence of the congregation, which was officially named Sisters of Charity of the General Hospital of Montreal. The letters patent arrived in Quebec in early October of that same year. From that point on, the Grey Nuns were officially responsible for the care of the institution.

=== Expansion of the Grey Nuns' work ===
Beginning in 1754, Marguerite d'Youville set about repairing and improving the General Hospital. In order to save money, the sisters took a direct part in the work, transporting materials and assisting the laborers. To finance the hospital's operations, they also engaged in various trades, such as making hosts, sewing, embroidery, transporting goods, selling materials, and even brewing beer. Since the hospital was located outside the city walls, Marguerite also had walls built, which were completed in 1757. In 1755, Bishop de Pontbriand visited the community for the first time and approved the early rule adopted in 1737. The Grey Nuns then numbered eleven sisters, which took care of a growing number of people who, since 1754, had come to include not only the elderly and infirm but also abandoned infants. Marguerite was determined to combat the infanticides which were common at the time. The Grey Nuns began taking in babies abandoned by their parents, which were nicknamed the Enfants Trouvés, or Foundlings. Despite its modest beginnings, this part of the Grey Nuns' ministry would eventually become one of their most significant initiatives. By the mid-19^{th} century, the sisters were caring for nearly 500 abandoned infants each year.

In 1755, smallpox struck the colony hard, where it remained endemic until 1771. In Montreal, the Religious Hospitallers of St. Joseph were quickly overwhelmed, and for the first time, the Grey Nuns took in and cared for the sick. Since they were not cloistered, they even went to care for the sick in their homes. Some also travelled to the Anishinaabe and Nbisiings living in the seigniory of Lac-des-Deux-Montagnes, which belonged to the Sulpicians. During the Seven Years' War, the Hôtel-Dieu of Montreal, like those in Trois-Rivières and Québec, could no longer meet the demand, and Montreal's General Hospital thus opened its doors to French soldiers sent to defend the colony against the British army.

=== War and British rule ===
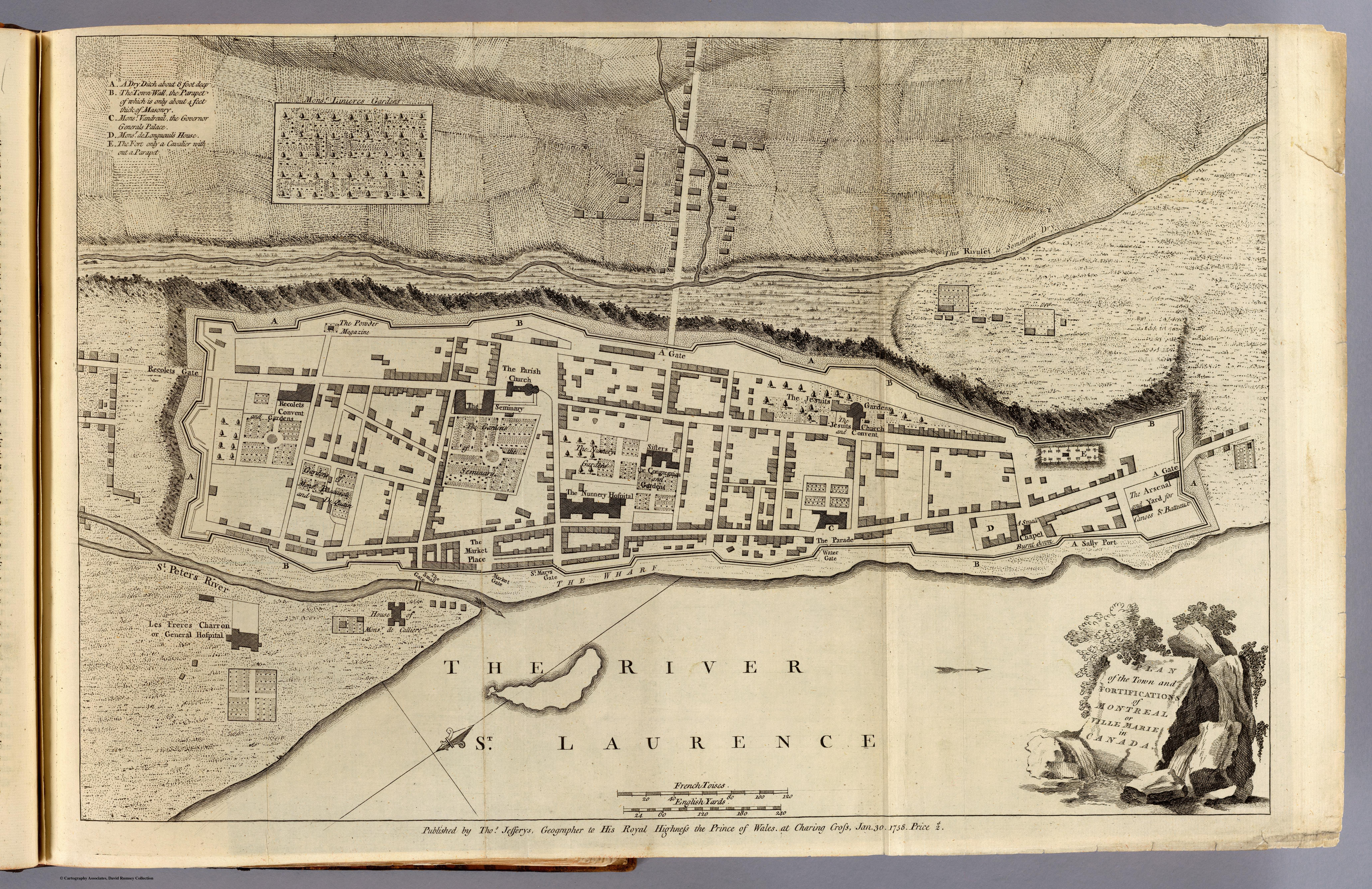
The Grey Nuns' General Hospital in 1758, outside of Montreal's fortifications

During the war, skirmishes between French and British soldiers regularly took place within view of the General Hospital, which was located outside of the city walls. British prisoners of war were also treated at the hospital, in the so-called "English room", which the Grey Nuns had set up to house them. This period proved difficult, however, for the hospital and the Grey Nuns, who, despite funding from France, had to take out loans to ensure proper care for soldiers from both sides. Once recovered, some British soldiers remained at the hospital, where they worked. Several, for example, worked on the farm that the sisters owned in Pointe-Saint-Charles. The situation did not damp Marguerite's ambitions. In 1757, she took steps to expand the hospital. Construction began in March 1757 but was halted shortly after due to lack of funds. The work would not be completed until 65 years later, with the opening of the Poors' Wing. Construction also began on a new chapel, which was dedicated in 1760.

On a more personal level, the war was a difficult time for Marguerite, who was particularly worried because her son, Father Charles-Marie-Madeleine d'Youville, had been captured by the British army during the Siege of Quebec. She was also deeply saddened by the death in 1759 of her spiritual director and the Grey Nuns' first benefactor, Louis Normant du Faradon. After the surrender of Montreal in 1760 and the beginning of the British military regime, the congregation lost several important sources of income. The sisters had previously done sewing work for French soldiers, but this was no longer the case under the British government. They could still rely on individual donations as well as income from their lands and farms. They also maintained good relations with British authorities, especially with the new governor of Montreal, Thomas Gage.

During the war, the Grey Nuns had supplied rations to the French army, which were paid for by Intendant Bigot with promissory notes. As was the case with other congregations in New France, the French defeat left the Grey Nuns in limbo regarding a sum of 120,800 livres owed by France. Five years later, in March 1765, Marguerite learned that the General Hospital would be only partially reimbursed. The payment would moreover be postponed several times. Nevertheless, the Grey Nuns took advantage of the departure of certain nobles during that period to purchase several properties, including the seigniory of Châteauguay,which became a major agricultural estate.

=== Fire of 1765 ===
In May 1765, a major fire destroyed part of Montreal, including the Grey Nuns' hospital. Only the stone walls, the brewery and the mill survived the fire, which consumed the rest of the buildings. During the reconstruction work, the sisters and their 114 boarders were housed at the Hôtel-Dieu, following the intervention of Étienne Montgolfier, the superior of the Montreal Sulpicians. The Sulpicians also lent the Grey Nuns 15,000 livres for the reconstruction of the General Hostpital. The people of Montreal contributed 3,523 livres, and fundraisers held in London also raised nearly 20,000 livres. Seven months later, the sisters and their residents were able to return to the hospital.

=== Death ===
Marguerite d'Youville's death certificate from 13 December 1771

Toward the end of her life, Marguerite d'Youville declined importantly. The hospital, which she had taken over more than two decades earlier, now housed 18 sisters and 150 residents, in addition to providing daily meals for 170 peoples. On December 9, 1771, Marguerite suffered a stroke, with a second one occurring on December 13, which left her paralyzed. On December 14, she dictated her spiritual will, in which she urged her sisters to continue her work. She died ten days later, on December 23, 1771. Her body was buried in the hospital's chapel. Marguerite-Thérèse Lemoine Despins, who had been entrusted to Marguerite's care after her mother's death in 1739, and who had subsequently become a novice in 1751, succeeded her a few days later as superior of the Grey Nuns.

== Sainthood ==
Marguerite d'Youville's sanctuary in Varennes

After her death, Marguerite d'Youville became the subject of hagiographic works. Her son Charles-Marie-Madeleine became her first biographer. He left two handwritten works for posterity, whose manuscripts, kept in the Grey Nuns' archives, were published during the 20^{th} century. In 1828, the Sulpician Antoine Sattin wrote a second biography, which he based on the testimony of Sister Thérèse-Geneviève Coutlée, who knew Marguerite well during her lifetime and who was the third superior of the congregation.

During his travels in Canada between 1849 and 1862, the Sulpician Étienne-Michel Faillon took a keen interest in Montreal's women congregations during the French regime. Known for his hagiographic writings, he agreed to write biographies of the foundresses of the city's three major religious communities, the Religious Hospitallers of Saint Joseph, the Congregation of Notre-Dame and the Sisters of Charity. His biography of Marguerite was based on the previous works of Charles-Marie-Madeleine d'Youville and Antoine Sattin.

The cause for the canonization of Marguerite d'Youville was introduced in 1890 by Pope Leo XIII, who declared the heroic virtue of the founder of the Sisters of Charity of Montreal. Faillon's work, which had contributed to her popularity among the faithful, was among the historical documents examined during the beatification process, which concluded on May 3, 1959, when Pope John XXIII proclaimed her Blessed and bestowed upon her the title of Mother of Universal Charity. In recognition of several miracles, including the healing of a young woman with leukemia in 1978, Marguerite d'Youville was finally canonized by Pope John Paul II in 1990, becoming the first catholic saint born in Canada, where she is now commemorated on October 16. According to the Roman Martyrology, Marguerite d'Youville's feast day is December 23.

Over the years, her remains were moved several times. Initially buried in the General Hospital's chapel, they were transferred with the Grey Nuns when they moved into their new motherhouse on Guy Street, now in Montreal's Downtown, where they remained until 2010, after the building was sold to Concordia University. Her remains were finally interred at the Basilica of Sainte Anne in Varennes, on the twentieth anniversary of her canonization.

== Legacy ==
=== The Sisters of Charity of Montreal ===
Albert Pelletier, Grey Nuns of the Cross of Ottawa and a priest in front of St. Albert's Hospital, Rouyn-Noranda (1929)

The work of the Grey Nuns continued to develop after the death of Marguerite d'Youville. In 1781, the congregation adopted its first official constitution, drafted by the Sulpician Étienne Montgolfier, who incorporated the two previous documents from 1737 and 1745. The Grey Nuns received their decretum laudis from Pope Pius IX in 1862, who formally approved their constitutions in 1865 and made them subject to pontifical authority directly.

By the mid-19^{th} century, the Grey Nuns' work had expanded significantly. Beginning in 1840, the number of sisters grew, reaching 327 by 1900. During this period, they founded numerous charitable institutions in Montreal, including day nurseries to care for young children and hospices for the elderly and infirm. They also developed their expertise in nursing by caring for sick Irish immigrants during the typhus epidemic of 1847. They continued to build on this expertise with the founding of hospitals during the late 19^{th} century and early 20^{th} century, such as Hôpital Notre-Dame and Hôpital Maisonneuve-Rosemont. Other similar institutions were founded by the Grey Nuns around the city. In 1868, the congregation decided to leave the General Hospital and had a new motherhouse constructed, to which it moved in 1871. It did not leave this building until 2007, when it was sold to Concordia University, which converted it into student housing.

The Grey Nuns also expanded significantly elsewhere in Quebec, across Canada and in the United States. In the mid-19^{th} century, independent communities were established in Saint-Hyacinthe, Ottawa and Quebec City. In 1844, the Grey Nuns set out for Saint-Boniface, in Manitoba, where they founded the first hospital in Western Canada. From there, they went on to Saskatchewan, Alberta and the Northwest Territories. Over the years, they established a significant presence in the Midwest and New England, where they continued their charitable and healthcare work in French. The Grey Nuns experienced an important decline in the 20^{th} century, and most of the nuns are now retired. Some are still active today in New England and Brazil.

=== Tribute ===
Santa Margarita de Youville parish in Cúcuta, Colombia

Marguerite d'Youville's name appears frequently in Quebec's toponyms. In Montreal, for example, there is a Marguerite d'Youville Street, a Lajemmerais Street, a d'Youville Square, and a Marguerite-De Lajemmerais School. For more than 30 years, from 1934 to 1967, a nursing school bore her name. It was eventually incorporated into the University of Montreal, where one of the buildings is now named after her. This building houses the university's Nursing School, the Institute of Religious Studies and the School of Public Health. A chair in nursing is named after her.

In Quebec City, there is also a Place d'Youville and a Marguerite-d'Youville Elementary School. Her name appears in several municipalities in Quebec, such as Saint-Hyacinthe, Nicolet, Lévis, Gatineau, Trois-Rivières and Ville-Marie. Marguerite d'Youville's memory is strong in her birthplace of Varennes, which is now part of the Marguerite-d'Youville Regional County Municipality. There is also a street named after her, as well as a promenade along the St. Lawrence River. Varennes also houses a shrine dedicated to her, not far from the Basilica of Sainte-Anne. Until 2011, a provincial electoral district bore her name.

Marguerite d'Youville commemorative stamp (1978)

Marguerite d'Youville's legacy extends well beyond the province of Quebec. Traces of here influence can be found in Ontario, Manitoba, Saskatchewan, Alberta, and British Columbia. D'Youville University, a private college located in Buffalo, New York, bears her name today. It was founded in 1908 by the Sisters of Charity of Ottawa. A parish is named after her in Cúcuta, Colombia, where the Grey Nuns had once been active.

In 1959, on the occasion of her beatification, Marguerite d'Youville was the subject of a Radio-Canada television drama starring Dyne Mousso. The play, written by Charlotte Savary, sparked controversy because of the way she was portrayed, prompting the broadcaster to issue an apology to the Grey Nuns. She was later designated a National Historic Person by the Government of Canada in 1973. In 1978, Canada Post issued a commemorative stamp bearing her likeness, designed by painter Antoine Dumas and printed in a run of over 28 million copies. In 2003, in recognition of her lifetime of charitable and humanitarian work, she was inducted into the Canadian Medical Hall of Fame.

== See also ==
- Grey Nuns
- Grey Nuns's Hospital
- Canadian Catholic saints

== Bibliography ==
=== Secondary sources ===
- Caulier, Brigitte (1992). "Bâtir l'Amérique des dévots. Les confréries de dévotion montréalaises depuis le Régime français". Revue d'histoire de l'Amérique française (in French). 46 (1): 45–66. doi:10.7202/305047ar.
- D'Allaire, Micheline (1997). Les communautés religieuses de Montréal (in French). Vol. 1. Montréal: Méridien.
- Deslandres, Dominique (June 5, 2024). "L'esclavage en Nouvelle-France". Histoire Canada (in French).
- Diefendorf, Barbara D. (2004). From penitence to charity : pious women and the Catholic Reformation in Paris. Oxford: Oxford University Press.
- Duffin, Jacalyn (2011). "Miracles and wonders : finding Canadian medical history in the Vatican archives" (PDF). Historical Studies. 66: 41–58.
- Fecteau, Jean-Marie; Vaillancourt, Éric (2007). Deslandres, Dominique; Dickinson, John A.; Hubert, Ollivier (eds.). "La charité à Montréal". Les Sulpiciens à Montréal : Une histoire de pouvoir et de discrétion (in French). Montréal: Fides: 241–264.
- Ferland-Angers, Albertine (1945). Mère d'Youville. Vénérable Marie-Marguerite du Frost de Lajemmerais veuve d'Youville, 1701-1771, Fondatrice des Sœurs de la Charité de l'Hôpital général de Montréal dites Sœurs Grises (in French). Montréal: Librairie Beauchemin.
- Foster, William Henry (2003). The Captor's narrative. Catholic woman and their puritan men on the early american frontier. Ithaca: Cornell University Press.
- Gousse, Suzanne (2009–2010). "Marie Catherine Demers Dessermon (1698-1785), cofondatrice oubliée". Revue d'histoire de l'Amérique française (in French). 63 (2–3): 243–273. doi:10.7202/044454ar.
- Imbeault, Sophie (2013). Imbeault, Sophie; Vaugeois, Denis; Veyssière, Laurent (eds.). "Que faire de tout cet argent de papier? Une déclaration séparée au traité de Paris". 1763. Le traité de Paris bouleverse l'Amérique (in French). Québec: Septentrion: 142–183.
- Lacelle, Claudette (1979). "Lemoine Despins, Marguerite-Thérèse". Dictionary of Canadian Biography.
- Lacelle, Claudette (1979). "Dufrost de Lajemmerais, Marie-Marguerite (Youville)". Dictionary of Canadian Biography.
- Lahaise, Robert (1980). Les édifices conventuels du Vieux Montréal : aspects ethno-historiques (in French). Montréal: Hurtubise.
- Lalonde-Graton, Micheline (2002). Des salles d'asile aux centres de la petite enfance : la petite histoire des services de garde au Québec (in French). Québec: Les Presses de l'Université du Québec.
- Laperle, Dominique (May 14, 2022). "La question des esclaves de mère Marguerite d'Youville et de l'Hôpital Général de Montréal dans les notices de Wikipédia". Société canadienne d'histoire de l'Église catholique (in French).
- Loucks, Alanna (July 6, 2021). "A Different Road to Sainthood: Building a Religious Community in Eighteenth-Century Montréal". Borealia.
- Lessard, Rénald (1998). Séguin, Normand (ed.). "Les soins de santé au Canada aux XVIIe et XVIIIe siècles". Atlas historique du Québec : l'Institution médicale (in French): 3–38.
- Mathieu, Jacques (2013). Deschênes, Gaston; Vaugeois, Denis (eds.). "Charles-Madeleine Youville-Dufrost et sa mère Marguerite d'Youville". Vivre la conquête : à travers plus de 25 parcours individuels (in French). 1. Québec: Septentrion: 232–236.
- Maurault, Olivier (1959). "M. Étienne-Michel Faillon (1800-1870)". Les Cahiers des dix (in French). 24 (59): 151–167. doi:10.7202/1079949ar.
- Mitchell, Estelle (1991). "« Mère à la charité universelle »: Marguerite d'Youville" (PDF). Cap-aux-Diamants (in French) (26): 44–47.
- Rheault, Marcel (2004). La médecine en Nouvelle-France : les chirurgiens de Montréal, 1642-1760 (in French). Québec: Septentrion.
- Sapoznik-Evans, Karlee A. (2017). "Des lacunes en historiographie : La Vérendrye dans une perspective de relations homme-femme, de relations raciales et d'esclavage au début du Canada français, 1731-1749". Cahiers franco-canadiens de l'Ouest (in French). 29 (2): 457–487. doi:10.7202/1042269ar.
- Tardif, Estelle (2001). Marguerite d'Youville. Le cri des pauvres (in French). Montréal: Bellarmin.
- Trudel, Marcel (1956). L'Église canadienne sous le Régime militaire, 1759-1764 (in French). Vol. 1. Montréal: Institut d'histoire de l'Amérique française.

=== Primary sources ===
- Constitutions des Sœurs de la Charité administratrices de l'Hôpital général de Montréal, dites vulgairement Sœurs grises (in Latin). Montréal: Imprimerie de l'Hôpital Général. 1880.
- d'Youville, Charles-Marie-Madeleine (1924–1925). "La vie de madame d'Youville, fondatrice des Sœurs de la Charité de Montréal". Rapport de l'Archiviste de la province de Québec (in French): 361–376.
- Faillon, Étienne-Michel (1852). Vie de Mme d'Youville, fondatrice des soeurs de la charité de Villemarie dans l'île de Montréal, en Canada (in French). Ville-Marie (Montréal): Chez les Sœurs de la Charité de l'Hôpital Général de Montréal.
- Sattin, Antoine (1928–1929). "La vie de madame Youville, fondatrice et première supérieure des Sœurs de la Charité de Montréal, communément nommées sœurs grises, dédiées à cette même communauté". Rapport de l'Archiviste de la province de Québec (in French): 387–436.

=== Mediagraphy ===
- "La translation des Restes mortels de sainte Marguerite d'Youville". Patrimoine immatériel religieux du Québec (IPIR) (in French). December 8, 2010.
- "Marie Marguerite d'Youville (1701-1771), foundress of the Sisters of Charity". The Holy See.
- "Saint Marguerite d'Youville (1701-1771)". Canadian Conference of Catholic Bishops.
- "Sainte Marguerite-Marie d'Youville, fondatrice d'oeuvres au Canada (+ 1771)". Nominis (in French).
- "The Grey Nuns of Montreal". The Grey Nuns of Montreal.
- "Sainte Marguerite d'Youville". Canadian Medical Hall of Fame.
- "Youville, Sainte-Marie-Marguerite d' National Historic Person". Parks Canada.
