= Albert-Alexandre Lussier =

Canadian politician

Member of the Legislative Assembly of Quebec for Verchères
- In office 1886–1897
- Preceded by: Abraham Bernard
- Succeeded by: Étienne Blanchard

Personal details
- Born: March 22, 1842 Varennes, Canada East
- Died: December 18, 1909 (aged 67)
- Party: Liberal

Albert-Alexandre Lussier (March 22, 1842 – December 18, 1909) was a seigneur and political figure in Quebec. He represented Verchères in the Legislative Assembly of Quebec from 1886 to 1897 as a Liberal.

He was born in Varennes, Canada East, the son of seigneur Félix Lussier and Angélique Deschamps, and was educated at the Collège Saint-Paul, Collège Masson and the agricultural college at Sainte-Thérèse. Lussier became seigneur of Varennes on his father's death. He also served as justice of the peace and municipal councillor. In 1874, Lussier married Marie-Louise, the daughter of seigneur Gaspard-Aimé Massue. He organized a campaign to assist the family of Louis Riel. Lussier was defeated when he ran for reelection to the Quebec assembly in 1897. He died at the age of 67 and was buried in the crypt of Sainte-Anne's church in Varennes.

His brother-in-law Joseph-Aimé Massue served in the Canadian House of Commons.
