= Sainte-Julie, Quebec =

Sainte-Julie
- City
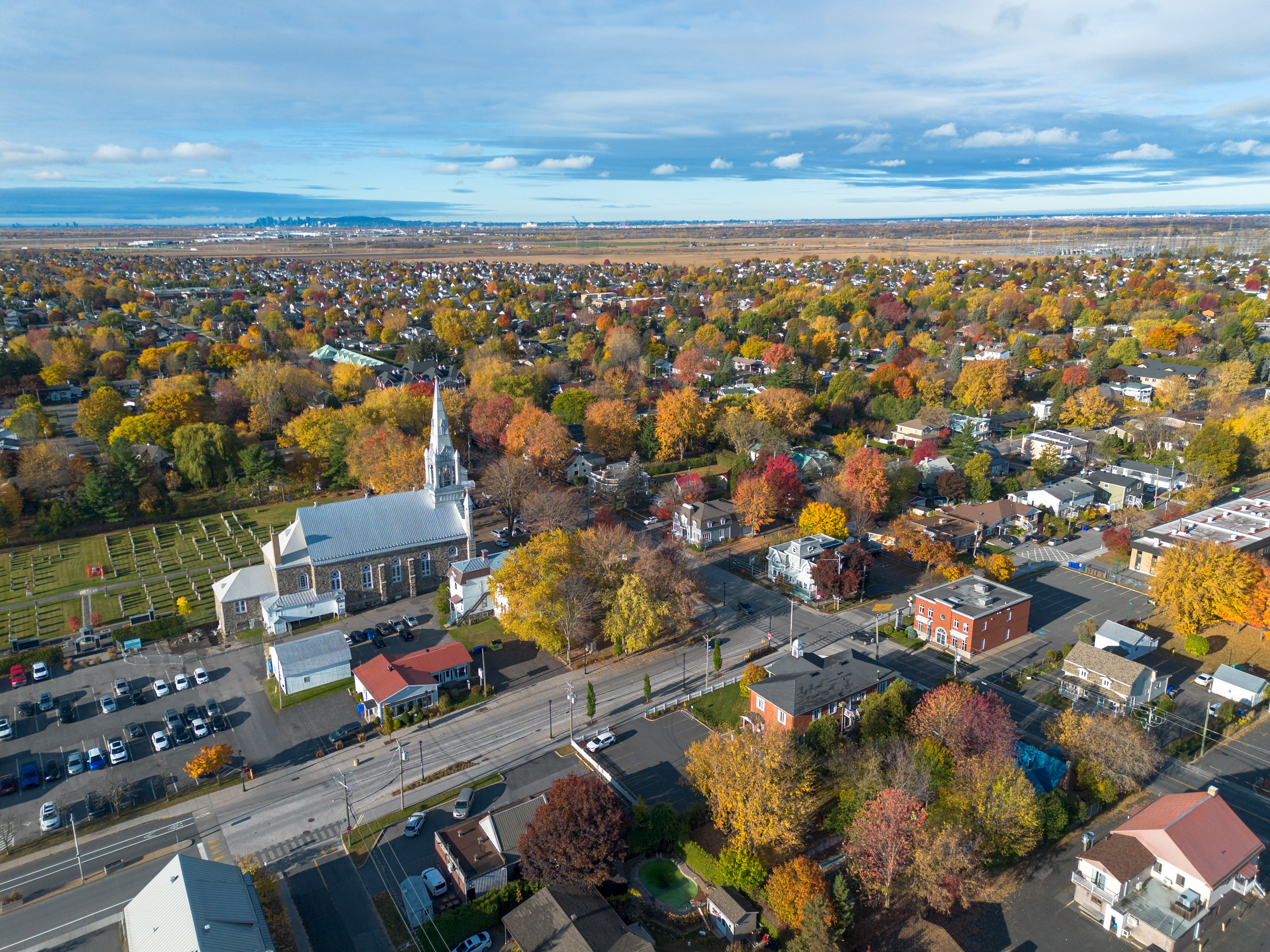
- Sainte-Julie in 2025

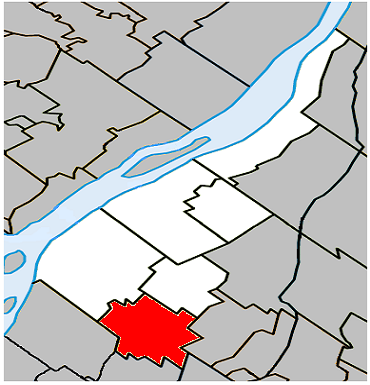
- Location within Marguerite-D'Youville RCM.

- Location in southern Quebec.
- Coordinates: 45°35′N 73°20′W
- Country: Canada
- Province: Quebec
- Region: Montérégie
- RCM: Marguerite-D'Youville
- Constituted: July 1, 1855

Government
  - Mayor: Mario Lemay
  - Federal riding: Mont-Saint-Bruno—L'Acadie
  - Prov. riding: Verchères

Area
  - Total: 48.90 km^{2} (18.88 sq mi)
  - Land: 48.49 km^{2} (18.72 sq mi)

Population (2021)
  - Total: 30,045
  - Density: 619.6/km^{2} (1,605/sq mi)
  - Pop 2016-2021: ▲0.5%
  - Dwellings: 11,761
- Time zone: UTC−5 (EST)
  - Summer (DST): UTC−4 (EDT)
- Postal code(s): J3E
- Area codes: 450 and 579
- Highways A-20 (TCH) A-30: R-229
- Website: www.ville. sainte-julie.qc.ca

Sainte-Julie (French pronunciation: [sɛ̃t ʒyli]), is an off-island suburb of Montreal, in southwestern Quebec, Canada, east of Montreal in Marguerite-D'Youville Regional County Municipality. The population as of the Canada 2021 Census was 30,045. In 2009 Sainte-Julie was called one of the best towns in which to live in Quebec, and the city is often known as "The Happiest City in Quebec" (French: "La ville la plus heureuse du Québec").

== History ==
The territory of Sainte-Julie, was part of the parish of Sainte-Anne-de-Varennes and was informally known as "Grand Coteau". These settlers mostly came from Boucherville.

Soon residents, finding the Sainte-Anne-de-Varennes parish too far away, asked to establish their own parish in 1843. In 1850 they received authorization and built a church on land belonging to Julie Gauthier dite St-Germain, who asked that the name of the patron Sainte-Julie be given to the parish after Julia of Corsica, a virgin martyr from the fifth century A.D.

On May 6, 1851, a civil proclamation recognized the parish municipality of Sainte-Julie. In the fall of 1851, there were more than 190 families and 1,251 people in Sainte-Julie, according to the federal census.

On July 1, 1885, the municipality of Sainte-Julie was officially created and obtained the right to legally elect, its first mayor, Jules Choquet. The first village school was built in 1885, located on Rue Principale at the intersection of Boulevard Saint-Joseph.

Disaster struck the municipality in 1929 with the collapse of the upper floor of a grain shed: four people lose their lives.

In the mid-1960s, the construction of the Quebec Autoroute 20 further stimulated the development of Sainte-Julie, which became a rapidly developing suburb south of Montreal. The 1960s were also marked by the protest against the smoke produced by the asphalt plan of the Desourdy company and the damage caused to Mont-Saint-Bruno. Also, in 1968, A CF-100 warplane from the Saint-Hubert ARC base crashes into a house on Rue Félix-Leclerc.

Sainte-Julie gained city status in 1971. The same year, the biggest snowstorm of the century paralyzes part of the city for several days.

The 1980s marks the inauguration of the public transportation system between Sainte-Julie and the Longueuil metro station, giving citizen a direct access to the Montreal transit system. Also, a fire at the PCB (polychlorinated biphenyls) warehouse in Saint-Basile-le-Grand forces the evacuation of part of the population.

== Geography ==
Sainte-Julie is located on the south shore of Montréal. The city is well connected to the nearby cities of Montréal and Longueuil by the highways 20 and 30. Moreover, the Transcanadian highway splits the city in 2.

== Demographics ==
Historical Census Data - Sainte-Julie, Quebec
Year	Pop.	±%
1861	1,433	—
1871	1,153	−19.5%
1881	1,181	+2.4%
1891	1,299	+10.0%
1901	1,354	+4.2%
1911	1,360	+0.4%
1921	1,489	+9.5%
1931	928	−37.7%
1941	967	+4.2%
1951	1,010	+4.4%
1956	1,117	+10.6%
1961	1,300	+16.4%
1966	1,427	+9.8%
1971	2,559	+79.3%
1976	8,666	+238.6%
1981	14,243	+64.4%
1986	15,502	+8.8%
1991	20,632	+33.1%
1996	24,030	+16.5%
2001	26,580	+10.6%
2006	29,079	+9.4%
2011	30,104	+3.5%
2016	29,881	−0.7%
2021	30,045	+0.5%

In the 2021 Census of Population conducted by Statistics Canada, Sainte-Julie had a population of 30,045 living in 11,609 of its 11,761 total private dwellings, a change of 0.5% from its 2016 population of 29,881. With a land area of 48.49 km^{2} (18.72 sq mi), it had a population density of 619.6/km^{2} (1,604.8/sq mi) in 2021.

Canada census – Sainte-Julie community profile

	2021	2016	2011
Population	30,045 (+0.5% from 2016)	29,881 (-0.5% from 2011)	30,104 (+3.5% from 2006)
Land area	48.49 km^{2} (18.72 sq mi)	48.53 km^{2} (18.74 sq mi)	49.53 km^{2} (19.12 sq mi)
Population density	619.6/km^{2} (1,605/sq mi)	615.7/km^{2} (1,595/sq mi)	607.8/km^{2} (1,574/sq mi)
Median age	44.4 (M: 43.6, F: 44.8)	39.7 (M: 38.8, F: 40.6)	38.8 (M: 38.3, F: 39.3)
Private dwellings	11,610 (total)	11,196 (total)	10,914 (total)
Median household income	$107,000	$94,515	$87,553

References: 2021 2016 2011

Canada Census Mother Tongue - Sainte-Julie, Quebec
Census	Total	French			English			French & English			Other		
Year	Responses	Count	Trend	Pop %	Count	Trend	Pop %	Count	Trend	Pop %	Count	Trend	Pop %
2021	29,465	27,055	▼4.0%	91.8%	540	▲14.9%	1.8%	300	▲71.4%	1.0%	1,305	▲43.4%	4.4%
2016	29,880	28,185	▼1.7%	94.3%	470	▼2.1%	1.6%	175	▼2.8%	0.6%	910	▲28.2%	3.0%
2011	30,030	28,660	▲2.9%	95.4%	480	▼2.0%	1.6%	180	▲300.0%	0.6%	710	▲9.2%	2.4%
2006	29,025	27,840	▲8.9%	95.9%	490	▲12.6%	1.7%	45	▼78.6%	0.2%	650	▲106.3%	2.2%
2001	26,535	25,575	▲10.9%	96.4%	435	▼20.9%	1.6%	210	▲281.8%	0.8%	315	▲8.6%	1.2%
1996	23,950	23,055	n/a	96.3%	550	n/a	2.3%	55	n/a	0.2%	290	n/a	1.2%

== Attractions ==
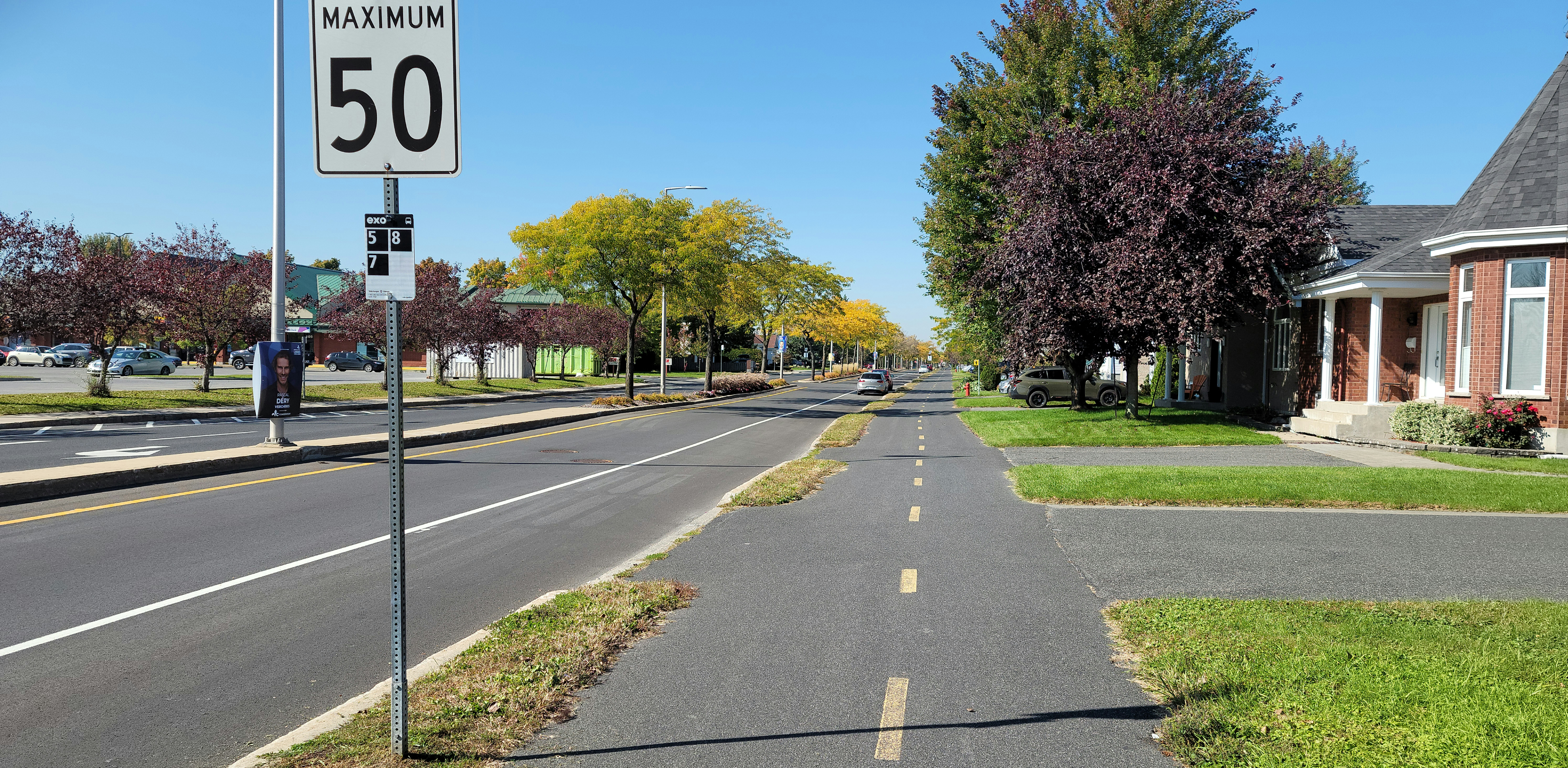
Bike path on boulevard N.-P.-Lapierre, near Grand-Côteau high school

Hydro-Quebec's electricity interpretation centre, Électrium, is located in Sainte-Julie. La Vallée du Richelieu Golf Club's Verchères course is also located in the city.

== Government ==
The mayor of Sainte-Julie is Mario Lemay. There are eight city councillors, all of which of members of La voix des citoyens - Équipe Mario Lemay, as of the 2025 Sainte-Julie municipal election.

Sainte-Julie City Council
District		Party	Councillor
1	de la Belle-Rivière-Ringuet	La voix des citoyens - Équipe Mario Lemay	Sylvain Dubuc
2	du Moulin	La voix des citoyens - Équipe Mario Lemay	Josée Marc-Aurèle
3	de la Vallée	La voix des citoyens - Équipe Mario Lemay	Alain Bourdages
4	du Rucher	La voix des citoyens - Équipe Mario Lemay	Sylvie Beaulieu
5	du Vieux-Village	La voix des citoyens - Équipe Mario Lemay	Christian Huard
6	du Grand-Coteau	La voix des citoyens - Équipe Mario Lemay	Eric Faucher
7	de l'Arc-en-Ciel	La voix des citoyens - Équipe Mario Lemay	Édith Lalanne
8	de la Montagne	La voix des citoyens — Équipe Suzanne Roy	Lucie Bisson

List of former mayors:

- Judes Choquet (1855–1857)
- Pierre Chenk (1857–1858)
- Louis Pilotte (1858–1860)
- Hyppolite Lozeau (1860–1862)
- Onésime Véronneau (1862–1864)
- Antoine-Narcisse Gauthier (1864–1870)
- Louis Pilotte (1870–1880)
- Jacques Senécal (1880–1887)
- François Xavier Choquet (1887–1888)
- Jacques Senécal (1888–1890)
- Léon Ayette dit Malo (1890–1902)
- Elie Bordua (1902–1903)
- Michel Bordua (1903–1905)
- Louis Beauchemin (1905–1907)
- Modeste Charlebois (1907–1908)
- Joseph Pierre Theodule Hueh (1908–1910)
- Jules Trudeau (1910–1913)
- Louis Philibert Provost (1913–1914)
- Joseph-Antoine Morin (1914–1914)
- Louis Provost (1914–1916)
- Joseph Elie Joachim Bourduas (1916–1922)
- Louis Savaria (1922–1927)
- Joseph Louis Comtois (1927–1929)
- Louis Savaria (1929-1933)
- Louis Philibert Provost (1933–1935)
- Joseph Gilbert Bénard (1935–1939)
- Joseph Stanislas Charlebois (1939–1945)
- Joseph Gabriel Joachim Bordua (1945–1950)
- Joseph Edmond Anathol Dalpé (1950–1950)
- Pierre Lamoureux (1950–1959)
- Joseph Leouis Armand-Gérard Savaria (1959–1972)
- Roland St-Pierre (1972–1975)
- Joseph-Anatole-André Savaria (1975–1980)
- Normand Larin (1980–1984)
- Joseph-Gérard-Maurice Savaria (1984–1993)
- Yvon Major (1993–2005)
- Suzanne Roy (2005–2021)
- Mario Lemay (2021–present)

Sainte-Julie is part of the federal electoral district of Mont-Saint-Bruno—L'Acadie, which is represented by Bienvenu-Olivier Ntumba of the Liberal Party. It is also part of the provincial electoral district of Verchères, which is represented by Suzanne Roy of the Coalition Avenir Québec.

== Infrastructure ==
The Sainte-Julie public transit system provides commuter and local bus services.

Quebec Autoroute 20, Quebec Autoroute 30 and Quebec Route 229 cross the city.

== Education ==
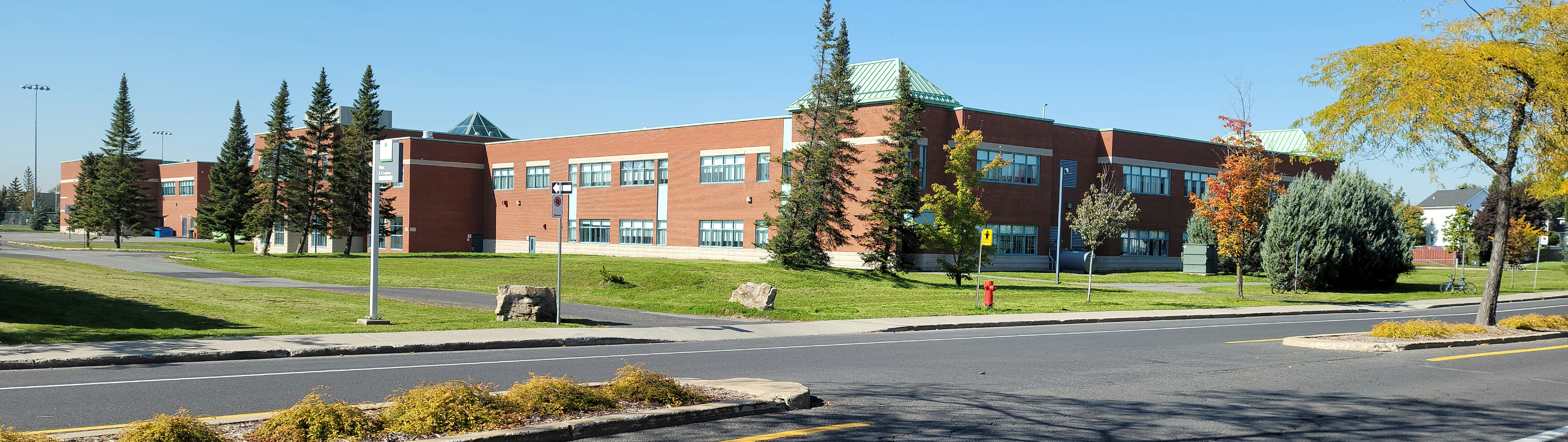
École secondaire du Grand-Côteau (Grand-Côteau High School), corner of N.-P.-Lapierre and Borduas streets

Secondary education is provided at the public secondary school of Grand-Côteau.

The South Shore Protestant Regional School Board previously served the municipality.

== See also ==
- List of cities in Quebec
