= Thomas McCarthy (Canadian politician) =

Canadian politician

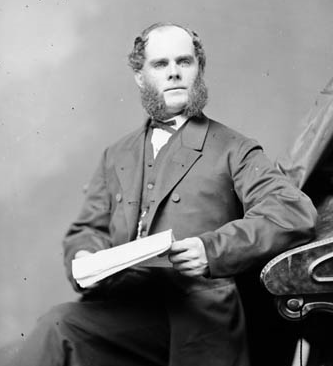

Member of the Canadian Parliament for Richelieu
- In office 1867–1870
- Succeeded by: Georges-Isidore Barthe

Personal details
- Born: 1832 County Cork, Ireland
- Died: September 23, 1870 (aged 37–38) Sorel, Quebec, Canada
- Party: Conservative

Thomas McCarthy (1832 – September 23, 1870) was a businessman and political figure in Canada East, later Quebec, Canada. He was a Conservative member of the House of Commons of Canada representing Richelieu from 1867 to 1870.

He was born in County Cork, Ireland in 1832, the son of John McCarthy, and came to Canada in 1839. McCarthy was a shipbuilder in the Sorel region in partnership with his brothers Daniel and John. He served on the council for Sorel in 1860, 1862, 1863 and 1865. McCarthy died at Sorel in 1870 while still in office.

== Electoral record ==
1867 Canadian federal election: Richelieu
Party	Candidate	Votes
Conservative	Thomas McCarthy	777
Unknown	Joseph-Xavier Perrault	625
Unknown	P. Gélinas	450
Eligible voters		2,912
Source: Canadian Parliamentary Guide, 1871
