= André-Boniface Craig =

Canadian politician

Member of the Legislative Assembly of Quebec for Verchères
- In office 1867–1871
- Succeeded by: Joseph Daigle

Personal details
- Born: September 20, 1824 Saint-Antoine-sur-Richelieu, Lower Canada
- Died: November 13, 1884 (aged 60) Montreal, Quebec
- Party: Conservative

André-Boniface Craig (September 20, 1824 – November 13, 1884) was a medical doctor and political figure in Quebec. He represented Verchères in the Legislative Assembly of Quebec from 1867 to 1871 as a Conservative member.

He was born in Saint-Antoine-sur-Richelieu, Lower Canada, the son of André Craig and Marie-Louise Leboeuf. He was admitted to the practice of medicine in 1845 and practised at Sainte-Élisabeth, Contrecoeur, Saint-Antoine and Montreal. In 1857, he married Marie-Césarie Lenoblet Duplessis. Craig was a landowner in the Eastern Townships. He was also an agent for the Equitable Life and International Life insurance companies. He held the chair of internal pathology and clinical medicine at the Montreal School of Medicine and Surgery. Craig was president of the Colonization Society for Verchères County and also served as justice of the peace and commissioner for the trial of small causes. He died in Montreal at the age of 60.
