= Richelieu (federal electoral district) =

Former federal electoral district in Quebec, Canada

Quebec electoral district

Defunct federal electoral district
- Legislature: House of Commons
- District created: 1867
- District abolished: 1933
- First contested: 1867
- Last contested: 1930

Richelieu (French: [ʁiʃ(ə)ljø]) was a federal electoral district in Quebec, Canada, that was represented in the House of Commons of Canada from 1867 to 1935.

It was created by the British North America Act, 1867 and was amalgamated into the Richelieu—Verchères electoral district in 1933.

In 1968, a new electoral district was created under the same name which is now known as Bas-Richelieu—Nicolet—Bécancour.

== Members of Parliament ==
This riding elected the following members of Parliament:

Parliament	Years	Member	Party
Richelieu
1st	1867–1870	Thomas McCarthy	Conservative
1st	1870–1872	Georges-Isidore Barthe	Independent Conservative
2nd	1872–1874	Michel Mathieu	Conservative
3rd	1874–1878	Georges-Isidore Barthe	Independent Conservative
4th	1878–1882	Louis Huet Massue	Liberal–Conservative
5th	1882–1887	Louis Huet Massue	Liberal–Conservative
6th	1887–1887	Jean-Baptiste Labelle	Conservative
6th	1887–1891	Joseph-Aimé Massue	Conservative
7th	1891–1892	Hector-Louis Langevin	Conservative
7th	1892–1896	Arthur Aimé Bruneau	Liberal
8th	1896–1900	Arthur Aimé Bruneau	Liberal
9th	1900–1904	Arthur Aimé Bruneau	Liberal
10th	1904–1907	Arthur Aimé Bruneau	Liberal
10th	1907–1908	Adélard Lanctôt	Liberal
11th	1908–1911	Adélard Lanctôt	Liberal
12th	1911–1912	Pierre-Joseph-Arthur Cardin	Liberal
12th	1912–1917	Pierre-Joseph-Arthur Cardin	Liberal
13th	1917–1921	Pierre-Joseph-Arthur Cardin	Opposition (Laurier Liberals)
14th	1921–1924	Pierre-Joseph-Arthur Cardin	Liberal
14th	1924–1925	Pierre-Joseph-Arthur Cardin	Liberal
15th	1925–1926	Pierre-Joseph-Arthur Cardin	Liberal
16th	1926–1926	Pierre-Joseph-Arthur Cardin	Liberal
16th	1926–1930	Pierre-Joseph-Arthur Cardin	Liberal
17th	1930–1935	Pierre-Joseph-Arthur Cardin	Liberal
Riding dissolved into Richelieu—Verchères

== Election results ==
1867 Canadian federal election
Party	Candidate	Votes
Conservative	Thomas McCarthy	777
Unknown	Joseph-Xavier Perrault	625
Unknown	P. Gélinas	450
Eligible voters		2,912
Source: Canadian Parliamentary Guide, 1871

By-election: On Mr. McCarthy's death, 23 September 1870

By-election on 18 November 1870
Party	Candidate	Votes
Independent Conservative	Georges-Isidore Barthe	1,194
Unknown	J. G. Crébassa	849

1872 Canadian federal election
Party	Candidate	Votes
Conservative	Michel Mathieu	1,249
Independent Conservative	Georges-Isidore Barthe	1,108

1874 Canadian federal election
Party	Candidate	Votes
Independent Conservative	Georges-Isidore Barthe	1,320
Conservative	Michel Mathieu	1,119
Source: lop.parl.ca

1878 Canadian federal election
Party	Candidate	Votes
Liberal–Conservative	Louis Huet Massue	1,227
Independent Conservative	Georges-Isidore Barthe	1,117

1882 Canadian federal election
Party	Candidate	Votes
Liberal–Conservative	Louis Huet Massue	1,205
Independent Conservative	Georges-Isidore Barthe	927

1887 Canadian federal election
Party	Candidate	Votes
Conservative	Jean-Baptiste Labelle	1,618
Liberal	N. H. Ladouceur	1,560

By-election: On Mr. Labelle's death, 3 August 1887

By-election on 18 October 1887
Party	Candidate	Votes
Conservative	Joseph-Aimé Massue	acclaimed

1891 Canadian federal election
Party	Candidate	Votes
Conservative	Hector-Louis Langevin	1,701
Liberal	Lomer Gouin	1,393

By-election: On Mr. Langevin's resignation

By-election on 11 January 1892
Party	Candidate	Votes
Liberal	Arthur Aimé Bruneau	acclaimed

1896 Canadian federal election
Party	Candidate	Votes
Liberal	Arthur Aimé Bruneau	1,609
Conservative	Alphonse Desjardins	1,475

1900 Canadian federal election
Party	Candidate	Votes
Liberal	Arthur Aimé Bruneau	1,803
Conservative	J. B. Vanasse	1,533

1904 Canadian federal election
Party	Candidate	Votes
Liberal	Arthur Aimé Bruneau	2,081
Conservative	L. B. J. Leclaire	1,769

By-election: On Mr. Bruneau being appointed Judge of the Superior Court of Quebec, 29 January 1907

By-election on 7 March 1907
Party	Candidate	Votes
Liberal	Adélard Lanctôt	2,467
Liberal	A. O. Rondeau	1,363

1908 Canadian federal election
Party	Candidate	Votes
Liberal	Adélard Lanctôt	2,468
Conservative	Edward A. D. Morgan	1,448

1911 Canadian federal election
Party	Candidate	Votes
Liberal	Arthur Cardin	2,373
Conservative	Arthur Pierre Vanasse	1,639

By-election: On election being declared void, 29 April 1912

By-election on 24 October 1912
Party	Candidate	Votes
Liberal	Arthur Cardin	2,154
Conservative	E. A. D. Morgan	1,896

1917 Canadian federal election
Party	Candidate	Votes
Opposition (Laurier Liberals)	Arthur Cardin	3,355
Government (Unionist)	Edward André "D." Morgan	834

1921 Canadian federal election
Party	Candidate	Votes
Liberal	Arthur Cardin	4,706
Conservative	William George Marcellin Morgan	2,044

By-election: On Mr. Cardin's acceptance of an office of emolument under the Crown, 30 January 1924

By-election on 27 February 1924
Party	Candidate	Votes
Liberal	Arthur Cardin	acclaimed

1925 Canadian federal election
Party	Candidate	Votes
Liberal	Arthur Cardin	4,562
Conservative	William Georges Marcellin Morgan	2,565

1926 Canadian federal election
Party	Candidate	Votes
Liberal	Arthur Cardin	4,893
Conservative	Aimé Chassé	2,927

By-election: On Mr. Cardin's acceptance of an office of emolument under the Crown, 5 October 1926

By-election on 2 November 1926
Party	Candidate	Votes
Liberal	Arthur Cardin	acclaimed

1930 Canadian federal election
Party	Candidate	Votes
Liberal	Arthur Cardin	5,644
Conservative	Joseph-Louis-Alphonse L'Heureux	3,236
Source: lop.parl.ca

== See also ==
- List of Canadian electoral districts
- Historical federal electoral districts of Canada
