= Michel Mathieu (Canadian politician) =

Canadian politician

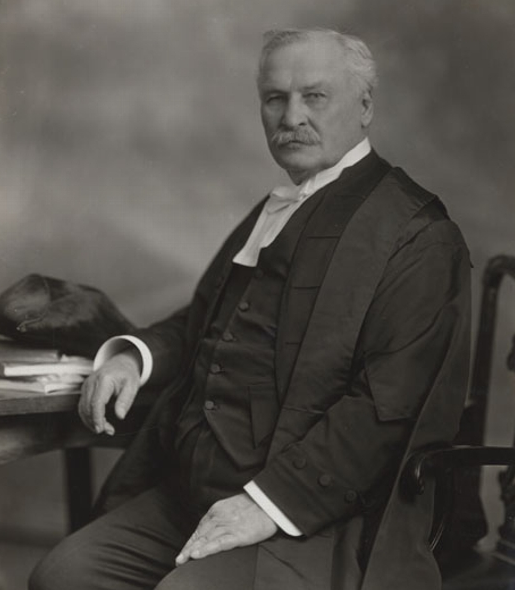

Member of the Canadian Parliament for Richelieu
- In office 1872–1874
- Preceded by: Georges-Isidore Barthe
- Succeeded by: Georges-Isidore Barthe

Member of the Legislative Assembly of Quebec for Richelieu
- In office 1875–1881
- Preceded by: Joseph-Adolphe Dorion
- Succeeded by: Léon Leduc

Personal details
- Born: 20 December 1838 Sorel, Lower Canada
- Died: 30 July 1916 (aged 77) Montreal, Quebec, Canada
- Party: Conservative

Michel Mathieu, QC (20 December 1838 – 30 July 1916) was a Quebec lawyer, notary, judge and political figure. He was a Conservative Member of Parliament who represented Richelieu from 1872 to 1874.

He was born in Sorel, Lower Canada in 1838. He articled as a notary, becoming a member of the Sorel Board of Notaries in 1864. In 1865, he was called to the Bar of Quebec and he was appointed sheriff in the Richelieu district in 1866. In 1872, he was elected to the House of Commons; he was defeated in 1874. In 1875, he was elected to the Quebec National Assembly for Richelieu in 1875 and 1878. He also served as mayor of Sorel from 1876 to 1882. In 1881, he resigned his seat in the provincial legislature to serve as judge in the Quebec Superior Court, serving in Joliette and Montreal districts until 1909. In 1880, he was appointed Queen's Counsel. He was professor of law at the Université Laval at Montreal from 1886 to 1915. In 1892, he was appointed to a royal commission in the province to investigate allegations of corruption in the government of Honoré Mercier; he did not complete this task due to health problems.

In 1869, with Adolphe Germain, he founded La Revue légale, a legal periodical; in 1884, it was purchased by Amédée Périard but Mathieu continued as editor until 1892. He published a weekly newspaper in Sorel, Le Courrier de Richelieu, from 1872 to 1874. He was editor for Rapports judiciaires révisés de la province de Québec ... (1891–1905), a 29 volume review of judgements by the province's courts. He also published several legal reference books, including editions of the Civil and Municipal codes.

Mathieu died at Montreal in 1916 and was buried at Sorel.

1872 Canadian federal election: Richelieu
| Party | Candidate | Votes |
|---|---|---|
| Conservative | Michel Mathieu | 1,249 |
| Independent Conservative | Georges-Isidore Barthe | 1,108 |

1874 Canadian federal election: Richelieu
| Party | Candidate | Votes |
|---|---|---|
| Independent Conservative | Georges-Isidore Barthe | 1,320 |
| Conservative | Michel Mathieu | 1,119 |
Source: lop.parl.ca
