= Guy Lapointe Jr. =

Quebec politician

Guy Lapointe MNA
- Guy Lapointe Jr., July 2026

Member of the National Assembly for Verchères
- Incumbent
- Assumed office October 5, 2026
- Preceded by: Suzanne Roy

Personal details
- Party: Parti Québécois
- Parent: Guy Lapointe (father)

Guy Lapointe Jr. is a Quebec politician who was the elected to the National Assembly of Quebec for Verchères in the 2026 Quebec general election as a member of the Parti Québécois. He is a graduate of police technology at John Abbott College. Before entering politics, Lapointe Jr. was a police officer and served as the director of communications for the Sûreté du Québec.. He is the son of former Montreal Canadiens player and Hockey Hall of Famer Guy Lapointe.

Lapointe Jr. was appointed Minister of Internal Security in 2026.

== Electoral record ==
2026 Quebec general election: Verchères
** Preliminary results — Not yet official **
Party	Candidate	Votes	%	±%
Parti Québécois	Guy Lapointe Jr.	17,105	39.90	
Coalition Avenir Québec	Marie-Hélène Leboeuf	7,639	17.82	
Liberal	Yacine Masrouki	6,520	15.21	
Conservative	Julien Malo	6,308	14.71	
Québec solidaire	Léonie Thibault Rousseau	4,981	11.62	
Climat Québec	Germain Dallaire	320	0.75	
Total valid votes				
Total rejected ballots				
Turnout			77.23	
Electors on the lists			–	–
Parti Québécois gain from Coalition Avenir Québec		Swing		+
Source: Élections Québec
