= Suzanne Roy =

Canadian politician

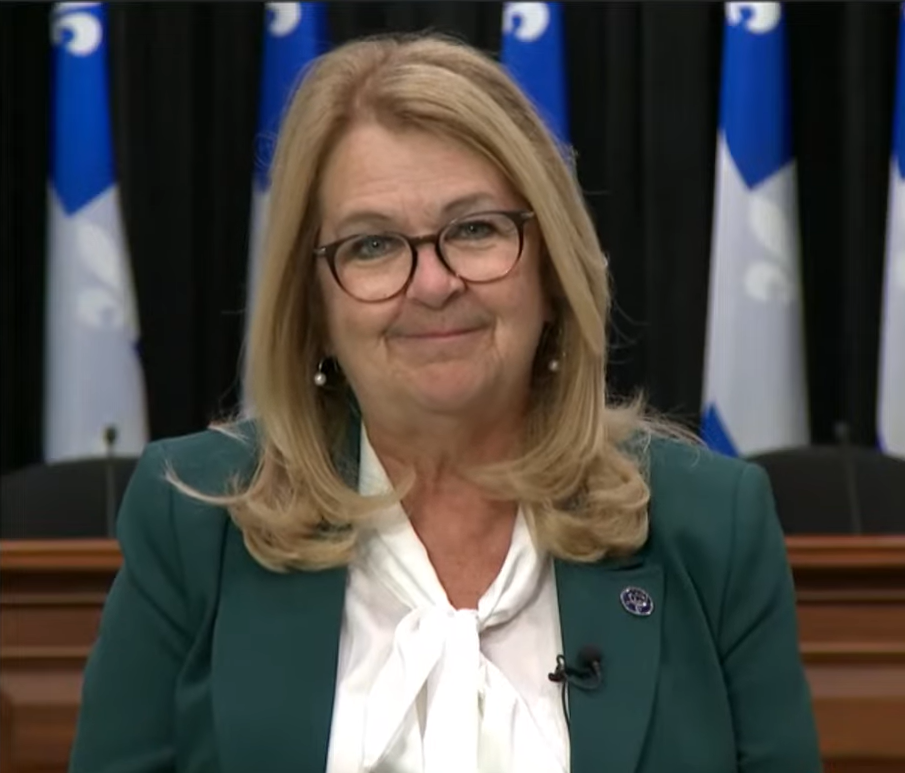
- Roy during an interview

Member of the National Assembly of Quebec for Verchères
- In office October 3, 2022 – August 27, 2026
- Preceded by: Suzanne Dansereau
- Succeeded by: Guy Lapointe Jr.

Personal details
- Born: 1962 (age 63–64) Sherbrooke, Quebec, Canada
- Party: Coalition Avenir Québec

Suzanne Roy is a Canadian politician who was elected to the National Assembly of Quebec in the 2022 Quebec general election. She represented the riding of Verchères as a member of the Coalition Avenir Québec until 2026.

Roy served as minister of women and families from 2022 to 2025. She did not seek re-election in the 2026 general election.

She served as the mayor of Sainte-Julie, Quebec from 2005 to 2021, as Warden of the Marguerite-D'Youville Regional County Municipality from 2005 to 2014 and from 2017 to 2021, and was a municipal councillor from 1996 to 2005.

== Electoral record ==
2022 Quebec general election: Verchères
Party	Candidate	Votes	%	±%
Coalition Avenir Québec	Suzanne Roy	23,672	51.28	+13.79
Parti Québécois	Cédric Gagnon-Ducharme	9,561	20.71	–14.96
Québec solidaire	Manon Harvey	6,665	14.44	–0.32
Conservative	Pascal Déry	3,269	7.08	+6.25
Liberal	Gabriel Lévesque	2,438	5.28	–3.54
Green	Nadim Saikali	318	0.69	–0.85
Climat Québec	Germain Dallaire	97	0.21	–
Independent	Lucien Beauregard	86	0.19	–
Démocratie directe	Pauline Boisvert	55	0.12	–
Total valid votes		46,161	98.75	+0.28
Total rejected ballots		586	1.25	–0.28
Turnout		46,747	75.28	–2.10
Electors on the lists		62,095	–	–
