= Adrien Beaudry =

Canadian politician (1879–1942)

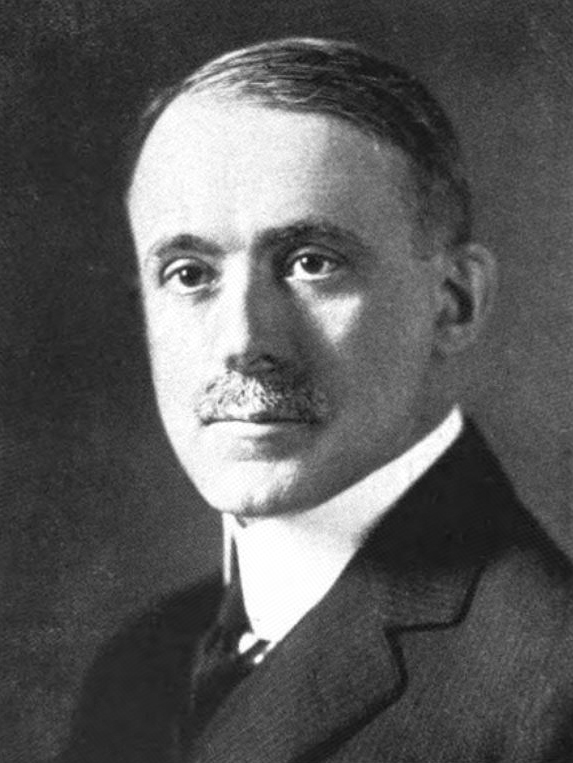

Member of the National Assembly of Québec
- In office 1916–1921
- Constituency: Verchères

Personal details
- Born: November 13, 1879 Saint-Marc-sur-Richelieu, Quebec
- Died: October 6, 1942 (aged 62) Montreal, Quebec
- Resting place: Notre-Dame-des-Neiges Cemetery
- Party: Quebec Liberal Party
- Occupation: Lawyer

Adrien Beaudry (November 13, 1879 – October 6, 1942) was a Quebec lawyer and politician. He was the Liberal deputy for Verchères from 1916 to 1921.

== Biography ==
Adrien Beaudry was born in Saint-Marc-sur-Richelieu on November 13, 1879.

He died in Montreal on October 6, 1942, and was buried at Notre-Dame-des-Neiges Cemetery.
