= Suzanne Dansereau =

Canadian politician

Member of the National Assembly of Quebec for Verchères
- In office October 1, 2018 – August 28, 2022
- Preceded by: Stéphane Bergeron
- Succeeded by: Suzanne Roy

Personal details
- Born: 1952 (age 73–74) Montreal
- Party: Coalition Avenir Québec

Suzanne Dansereau is a Canadian politician, who was elected to the National Assembly of Quebec in the 2018 provincial election. She represents the electoral district of Verchères as a member of the Coalition Avenir Québec.

She served on the municipal council of Contrecœur, Quebec from 1993 to 2001, and as mayor from 2001 to 2017. She was the Prefect of the Marguerite-D'Youville Regional County Municipality from 2014 to 2017.

== Electoral record ==
2018 Quebec general election: Verchères
Party	Candidate	Votes	%	±%
Coalition Avenir Québec	Suzanne Dansereau	17,073	37.49	+7.14
Parti Québécois	Stéphane Bergeron	16,246	35.67	-6.92
Québec solidaire	Jean-René Péloquin	6,723	14.76	+7.67
Liberal	Agnieszka Wnorowska	4,017	8.82	-10.12
Green	Pierre-Olivier Downey	701	1.54	
New Democratic	Vincent Hillel	403	0.88	
Conservative	Lisette Benoit	380	0.83	
Total valid votes		45,543	98.47	
Total rejected ballots		708	1.53	
Turnout		46,251	77.38	
Eligible voters		59,769		
Coalition Avenir Québec gain from Parti Québécois		Swing		+7.03
Source(s) "Rapport des résultats officiels du scrutin". Élections Québec.
