= Arthur Aimé Bruneau =

Canadian politician

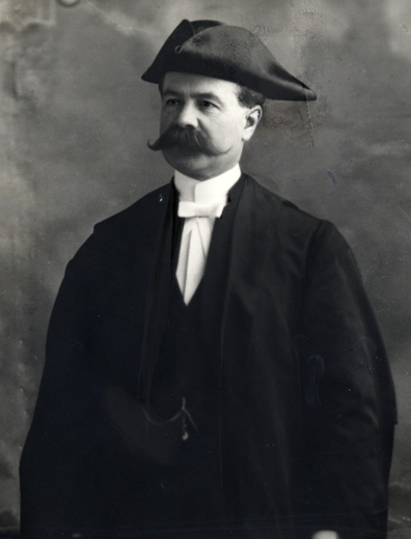

Member of the Canadian Parliament for Richelieu
- In office 1892–1907
- Preceded by: Hector-Louis Langevin
- Succeeded by: Adélard Lanctot

Personal details
- Born: March 4, 1864 St-Athanase d'Iberville, Canada East
- Died: December 1, 1940 (aged 76)
- Party: Liberal

Arthur Aimé Bruneau (March 4, 1864 – December 1, 1940) was a Canadian politician.

Born in St-Athanase d'Iberville, Canada East, the son of J. J. Bruneau and Marie Louise Bruneau, Bruneau was educated at the College of the Sacred Heart, Sorel, and at the Jesuits' College, Montreal. He then entered the law department of Université Laval, following at the same time the study of law in the office of Hon. R. Laflamme. In January 1887, he was admitted to the Quebec Bar, and at once established himself in Sorel.

At the by-election of 1892, he was acclaimed as the Liberal candidate for Richelieu for the House of Commons of Canada. He was re-elected in 1896, 1900, and 1904. He resigned in 1907 when he was appointed as a Judge of the Superior Court of Quebec.

== Electoral record ==
By-election on 11 January 1892
Party	Candidate	Votes
Liberal	Arthur Aimé Bruneau	acclaimed

1896 Canadian federal election: Richelieu
Party	Candidate	Votes
Liberal	Arthur Aimé Bruneau	1,609
Conservative	Alphonse Desjardins	1,475

1900 Canadian federal election: Richelieu
Party	Candidate	Votes
Liberal	Arthur Aimé Bruneau	1,803
Conservative	J. B. Vanasse	1,533

1904 Canadian federal election: Richelieu
Party	Candidate	Votes
Liberal	Arthur Aimé Bruneau	2,081
Conservative	L. B. J. Leclaire	1,769

ශ
