= Louis Massue =

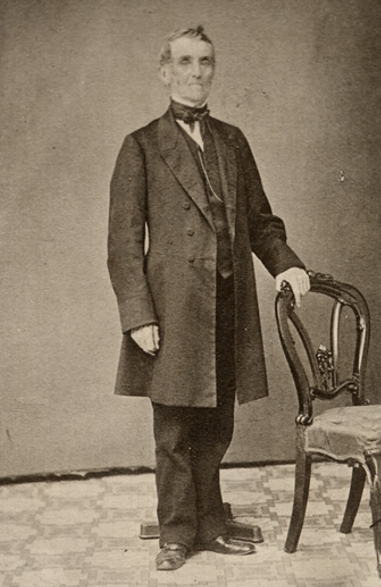
Louis Massue

Louis Massue (April 4, 1786 – July 4, 1869) was a businessman and political figure in Canada East.

He was born Louis-Joseph Massue in Varennes in 1786, the son of the co-seigneur of Varennes. He became a prosperous merchant in the import and dry goods trade at Quebec City. In 1818, he was named to the board of governors for the Quebec Bank. Massue helped found the Quebec Fire Insurance Company and was president of the Canadian Fire Insurance Company. In 1840, he retired from business. Massue served on the Quebec City Council from 1841 to 1846. He did not support the Lower Canada Rebellion but also opposed the Union of Upper and Lower Canada that followed. In 1843, he was named to the Legislative Council of the Province of Canada; he resigned in 1851 to become customs inspector at the Port of Quebec. He suffered a series of financial losses around 1849, including personal liability as a director of the Quebec Bank for the failure of a merchant who owed money to the bank, which forced the sale of Massue's extensive property holdings.

He died at Quebec City in 1869.

His brother Aignan-Aimé Massue served as a member of the legislative assembly for Lower Canada. His nephew, Louis Huet Massue, later became a member of the House of Commons of Canada.
