= Verchères (provincial electoral district) =

Provincial electoral district in Quebec, Canada

Coordinates: 45°41′N 73°26′W

Quebec electoral district

Provincial electoral district
- Legislature: National Assembly of Quebec
MNA
Guy Lapointe
Parti Québécois
- District created: 1867
- District abolished: 1939
- District re-created: 1944
- First contested: 1867
- Last contested: 2026

Demographics
- Population (2006): 57,095
- Electors (2012): 56,094
- Area (km²): 404.4
- Pop. density (per km²): 141.2
- Census division: Lajemmerais (Marguerite-D'Youville)
- Census subdivision(s): Calixa-Lavallée, Saint-Amable, Sainte-Julie, Varennes, Verchères

Verchères (French pronunciation: [vɛʁʃɛʁ]) is a provincial electoral district in the Montérégie region of Quebec, Canada. It corresponds exactly to the territory of Marguerite-D'Youville Regional County Municipality.

It was created for the 1867 election (and an electoral district of that name existed earlier in the Legislative Assembly of the Province of Canada and the Legislative Assembly of Lower Canada). It disappeared in the 1939 election and its successor electoral district was Richelieu-Verchères; however, it was re-created for the 1944 election.

In the change from the 2001 to the 2011 electoral map, it lost Saint-Roch-de-Richelieu to the riding of Richelieu, La Présentation to the riding of Saint-Hyacinthe, and several municipalities to the riding of Borduas, but gained Sainte-Julie from the defunct riding of Marguerite-D'Youville. Sainte-Julie is now the biggest municipality in the district

In 2026, it lost Contrecoeur.

== Members of the Legislative Assembly / National Assembly ==
Legislature	Years	Member	Party
1st	1867–1871	André-Boniface Craig	Conservative
2nd	1871–1875	Joseph Daigle	Liberal
3rd	1875–1878	Joseph Daigle	Liberal
4th	1878–1879	Jean-Baptiste Brousseau	Liberal
4th	1879–1881	Achille Larose	Liberal
5th	1881–1886	Abraham Bernard	Liberal
6th	1886–1890	Albert-Alexandre Lussier	Liberal
7th	1890–1892	Albert-Alexandre Lussier	Liberal
8th	1892–1897	Albert-Alexandre Lussier	Liberal
9th	1897–1900	Étienne Blanchard	Liberal
10th	1900–1904	Étienne Blanchard	Liberal
11th	1904–1908	Étienne Blanchard	Liberal
12th	1908–1912	Amédée Geoffrion	Liberal
13th	1912–1916	Joseph-Léonide Perron	Liberal
14th	1916–1919	Adrien Beaudry	Liberal
15th	1919–1921	Adrien Beaudry	Liberal
15th	1921–1923	Jean-Marie Richard	Liberal
16th	1923–1927	Jean-Marie Richard	Liberal
17th	1927–1931	Felix Messier	Liberal
18th	1931–1935	Felix Messier	Liberal
19th	1935–1936	Felix Messier	Liberal
20th	1936–1939	Felix Messier	Liberal
Riding dissolved into Richelieu-Verchères
Riding re-created from Richelieu-Verchères
22nd	1944–1948	Arthur Dupré	Liberal
23rd	1948–1952	Arthur Dupré	Liberal
24th	1952–1956	Arthur Dupré	Liberal
25th	1956–1960	Clodomir Ladouceur	Union Nationale
26th	1960–1962	Guy Lechasseur	Liberal
27th	1962–1966	Guy Lechasseur	Liberal
28th	1966–1970	Guy Lechasseur	Liberal
29th	1970–1973	Guy Saint-Pierre	Liberal
30th	1973–1976	Marcel Ostiguy	Liberal
31st	1976–1981	Jean-Pierre Charbonneau	Parti Québécois
32nd	1981–1985	Jean-Pierre Charbonneau	Parti Québécois
33rd	1985–1989	Jean-Pierre Charbonneau	Parti Québécois
34th	1989–1994	Luce Dupuis	Parti Québécois
35th	1994–1998	Bernard Landry	Parti Québécois
36th	1998–2003	Bernard Landry	Parti Québécois
37th	2003–2005	Bernard Landry	Parti Québécois
37th	2005–2007	Stéphane Bergeron	Parti Québécois
38th	2007–2008	Stéphane Bergeron	Parti Québécois
39th	2008–2012	Stéphane Bergeron	Parti Québécois
40th	2012–2014	Stéphane Bergeron	Parti Québécois
41st	2014–2018	Stéphane Bergeron	Parti Québécois
42nd	2018–2022	Suzanne Dansereau	Coalition Avenir Québec
43rd	2022–2026	Suzanne Roy	Coalition Avenir Québec
44th	2026–Present	Guy Lapointe	Parti Québécois

== Election results ==
2026 Quebec general election
** Preliminary results — Not yet official **
Party	Candidate	Votes	%	±%
Parti Québécois	Guy Lapointe Jr.	17,105	39.90	
Coalition Avenir Québec	Marie-Hélène Leboeuf	7,639	17.82	
Liberal	Yacine Masrouki	6,520	15.21	
Conservative	Julien Malo	6,308	14.71	
Québec solidaire	Léonie Thibault Rousseau	4,981	11.62	
Climat Québec	Germain Dallaire	320	0.75	
Total valid votes				
Total rejected ballots				
Turnout			77.23	
Electors on the lists			–	–
Parti Québécois gain from Coalition Avenir Québec		Swing		+
Source: Élections Québec

2022 Quebec general election redistributed results
Party	Vote	%
Coalition Avenir Québec	21,157	51.66
Parti Québécois	8,343	20.37
Québec solidaire	6,000	14.65
Conservative	2,788	6.81
Liberal	2,181	5.33
Others	487	1.19

2022 Quebec general election
Party	Candidate	Votes	%	±%
Coalition Avenir Québec	Suzanne Roy	23,672	51.28	+13.79
Parti Québécois	Cédric Gagnon-Ducharme	9,561	20.71	–14.96
Québec solidaire	Manon Harvey	6,665	14.44	–0.32
Conservative	Pascal Déry	3,269	7.08	+6.25
Liberal	Gabriel Lévesque	2,438	5.28	–3.54
Green	Nadim Saikali	318	0.69	–0.85
Climat Québec	Germain Dallaire	97	0.21	–
Independent	Lucien Beauregard	86	0.19	–
Démocratie directe	Pauline Boisvert	55	0.12	–
Total valid votes		46,161	98.75	+0.28
Total rejected ballots		586	1.25	–0.28
Turnout		46,747	75.28	–2.10
Electors on the lists		62,095	–	–

2018 Quebec general election
Party	Candidate	Votes	%	±%
Coalition Avenir Québec	Suzanne Dansereau	17,073	37.49	+7.14
Parti Québécois	Stéphane Bergeron	16,246	35.67	-6.92
Québec solidaire	Jean-René Péloquin	6,723	14.76	+7.67
Liberal	Agnieszka Wnorowska	4,017	8.82	-10.12
Green	Pierre-Olivier Downey	701	1.54	
New Democratic	Vincent Hillel	403	0.88	
Conservative	Lisette Benoit	380	0.83	
Total valid votes		45,543	98.47	
Total rejected ballots		708	1.53	
Turnout		46,251	77.38	
Eligible voters		59,769		
Coalition Avenir Québec gain from Parti Québécois		Swing		+7.03
Source(s) "Rapport des résultats officiels du scrutin". Élections Québec.

2014 Quebec general election
Party	Candidate	Votes	%	±%
Parti Québécois	Stéphane Bergeron	18,467	42.59	-4.68
Coalition Avenir Québec	Yves Renaud	13,160	30.35	-1.12
Liberal	Simon Rocheleau	8,213	18.94	+5.18
Québec solidaire	Céline Jarrousse	3,074	7.09	+3.02
Option nationale	Mathieu Coulombe	450	1.04	-1.18
Total valid votes		43,364	98.08	
Total rejected ballots		850	1.92	
Turnout		44,214	76.96	
Electors on the lists		57,448		
Parti Québécois hold		Swing		-1.78

2014 results reference:

2012 Quebec general election
Party	Candidate	Votes	%	±%
Parti Québécois	Stéphane Bergeron	22,052	47.27	-8.15
Coalition Avenir Québec	Chantal Soucy	14,682	31.47	+15.98
Liberal	Maxime St-Onge	6,419	13.76	-9.11
Québec solidaire	Marie-Thérèse Toutant	1,900	4.07	+1.42
Option nationale	Diane Massicotte	1,035	2.22	–
Independent	Steven Terranova	297	0.64	–
CC	Mario Geoffrion	269	0.58	–
Total valid votes		46,654	98.71	
Total rejected ballots		608	1.29	
Turnout		47,262	84.14	
Electors on the lists		56,169		
Parti Québécois hold		Swing		-12.06

* Coalition Avenir Québec change is from the Action démocratique.

2012 results reference:

2008 Quebec general election
Party	Candidate	Votes	%	±%
Parti Québécois	Stéphane Bergeron	15,664	55.42	+14.17
Liberal	Vincent Sabourin	6,464	22.87	+8.68
Action démocratique	Daniel Castonguay	4,377	15.49	-21.83
Green	Christine Hayes	845	2.99	-1.21
Québec solidaire	Lynda Gadoury	749	2.65	-0.40
Parti indépendantiste	Yvon Sylva Aubé	164	0.58	–

2007 Quebec general election
Party	Candidate	Votes	%	±%
Parti Québécois	Stéphane Bergeron	13,811	41.25	-27.95
Action démocratique	Luc Robitaille	12,495	37.32	+27.20
Liberal	Paul Verret	4,751	14.19	-3.45
Green	Geneviève Ménard	1,407	4.20	-
Québec solidaire	Michelle Hudon-David	1,020	3.05	+0.01*

* Increase is from UFP

Verchères by-election, December 12, 2005
Party	Candidate	Votes	%	±%
Parti Québécois	Stéphane Bergeron	13,118	69.20	+14.42
Liberal	Jean Robert	3,344	17.64	-10.52
Action démocratique	Denise Graveline	1,919	10.12	-4.69
UFP	Jean-François Lessard	576	3.04	+2.41

2003 Quebec general election
Party	Candidate	Votes	%	±%
Parti Québécois	Bernard Landry	16,963	54.78	-5.86
Liberal	Mario Lebrun	8,720	28.16	+4.97
Action démocratique	François Pratte	4,585	14.81	-0.30
Bloc Pot	Sébastien Drouin	505	1.63	-
UFP	Marc-André Morvan	195	0.63	-

== See also ==
- List of Quebec provincial electoral districts
- Canadian provincial electoral districts
