= Antoine Dumas =

Canadian painter (1932–2020)

- Born: December 8, 1932; Quebec City, Quebec, Canada
- Died: October 17, 2020 (aged 87); Quebec City, Quebec, Canada
- Occupation: Painter

Antoine Dumas (8 December 1932 – 17 October 2020) was a Canadian painter.

== Biography ==
Dumas studied at the École des beaux-arts de Québec. He began working as a graphic designer for Payeur Publicité. He then became an illustrator. In 1969, he moved to California to study at the Academy of Art University in San Francisco after being recommended by Jean Paul Lemieux. In 1970, he published À l'enseigne d'antan, a perspective on traditional Québécois insignias. He created three stamps for Canada Post to commemorate Germaine Guèvremont, Marie-Marguerite d'Youville, and the 25th Quebec Winter Carnival. In 1977, he illustrated a luxury edition of the book Kamouraska by Anne Hébert. He directed a specialized program in graphic communications at Université Laval from 1970 to 1973. He then taught at the University full-time from 1973 to 1997.

Antoine Dumas died in Quebec City on 17 October 2020 at the age of 87.

== Exhibitions ==
- Antoine Dumas, Galerie Zannettin, Quebec City (1968–1971)
- Antoine Dumas, Musée national des beaux-arts du Québec (1973)
- Antoine Dumas, La Maison des arts La Sauvergarde, Montreal (1973)
- Antoine Dumas, Musée régional de Rimouski, Rimouski (1973)
- Antoine Dumas, Consulate General of Canada in New York, New York City (1975)
- Rétrospective Antoine Dumas, Villa Bagatelle, Sillery (1989)
