= Achille Larose =

Canadian politician

Member of the Legislative Assembly of Quebec for Verchères
- In office 1879–1881
- Preceded by: Jean-Baptiste Brousseau
- Succeeded by: Abraham Bernard

Personal details
- Born: February 27, 1839 Verchères, Lower Canada
- Died: January 20, 1904 (aged 64) Calixa-Lavallée, Quebec
- Party: Liberal

Achille Larose (February 27, 1839 – January 20, 1904) was a farmer and political figure in Quebec. He represented Verchères in the Legislative Assembly of Quebec from 1879 to 1881 as a Liberal.

He was born Achille Chagnon in Verchères, Lower Canada, the son of Hubert Chagnon and Marguerite Chagnon, and was educated at the Collège de l'Assomption. He married Philomène Dansereau in 1861. In 1872, he moved to Ware, Massachusetts. He was elected to the Quebec assembly in an 1879 by-election held after the election of Jean-Baptiste Brousseau was overturned. His election was declared invalid in 1881 after it was found that one of his supporters had resorted to bribery to win votes. Larose died at Calixa-Lavallée at the age of 64.
