= Luce Dupuis =

Canadian politician

Luce Dupuis (born September 25, 1940) is an artist, educator and former politician in Quebec, Canada. She represented Verchères in the Quebec National Assembly from 1989 to 1994 as a Parti Québécois member.

The daughter of Elzéar Leroux, a farmer and civil service contractor, and Joséphine Séguin, a teacher, she was born Luce Leroux in Sainte-Marthe. She obtained a teaching certificate from the École normale Esther-Blondin in Rigaud. Dupuis received a bachelor's degree in plastic arts from the Université du Québec à Montréal and a master's degree in creative arts from Concordia University. She also earned a master's degree in fundamentals of education from the Université de Montréal. She taught primary and secondary school and went on to teach sculpture at the Université du Québec à Trois-Rivières and the Université du Québec à Montréal.

Dupuis was elected to the Quebec assembly in 1989. She did not run for reelection in 1994. In 2003, she ran unsuccessfully for the position of mayor of Mont-Saint-Hilaire.

In her art, she mainly works with steel and plexiglas. Her sculptures have been exhibited in North America and Europe. Her work is held in various public and private collections, including the Musée national des beaux-arts du Québec and the Musée d'art contemporain de Montréal. Dupuis has been a member of the Association des sculpteurs du Québec and of the Sculptors Society of Canada. In 1972, she was awarded the Prix Beth Zion Sisterhood and the Prix du premier ministre du Québec. She was a founding member of the Centre d’exposition Expression at Saint-Hyacinthe

From 1995 to 1998, she was cultural consultant for the Société générale des industries culturelles. In 2006, she was named head of the Commission des aînés de l'Action démocratique du Québec.
