= Joseph-Aimé Massue =

Canadian politician

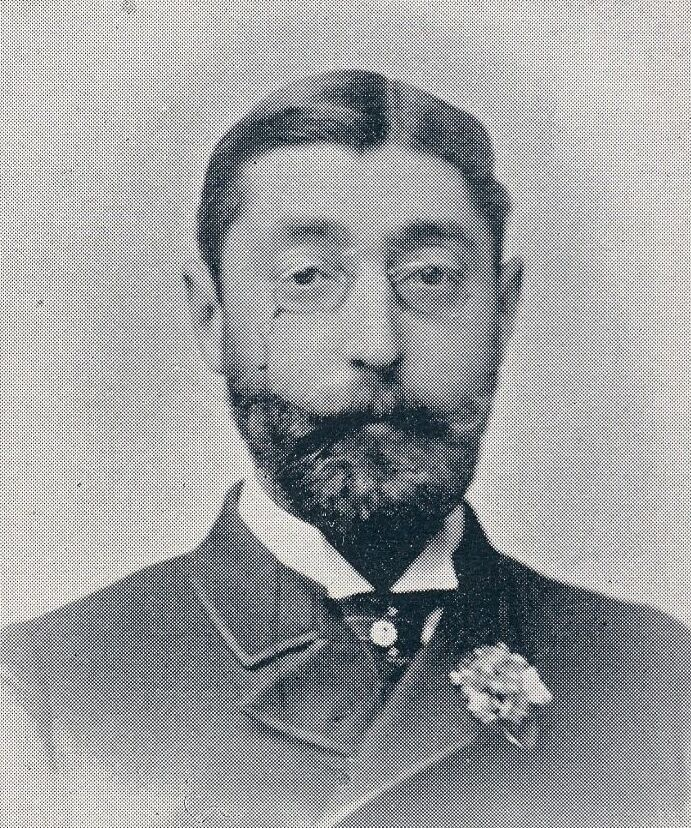
Joseph-Aimé Massue

Joseph-Aimé Massue (October 18, 1860 – April 10, 1891) was a seigneur and political figure in Quebec. He represented Richelieu in the House of Commons of Canada from 1887 to 1891 as a Conservative member.

== Biography ==
He was born Marie-Joseph-Jean-Baptiste-Edouard-Aimé Massue in Saint-Aimé, the son of Gaspard-Aimé Massue and Julie-Appolline Lussier. Massue was educated at the Collège Saint-Hyacinthe. He was first elected to the House of Commons at the age of 27 in an 1887 by-election held following the death of Jean-Baptiste Labelle. After suffering from poor health for some time, Massue went to Montreal in July 1890 to seek medical treatment. In September of that year, he travelled to Paris, seeking a cure there. Still ill, he returned to Saint-Aimé where he died at the age of 30.

His uncle Louis Huet Massue also represented Richilieu in the House of Commons. His sister Marie-Louise married Albert-Alexandre Lussier who served in the Quebec assembly.
