= Abraham Bernard =

Canadian politician

Member of the Legislative Assembly of Quebec for Verchères
- In office 1881–1886
- Preceded by: Achille Larose
- Succeeded by: Albert-Alexandre Lussier

Personal details
- Born: April 4, 1831 Saint-Mathieu-de-Beloeil, Lower Canada
- Died: May 16, 1899 (aged 68) Saint-Mathieu-de-Beloeil, Quebec
- Party: Liberal

Abraham Bernard (April 4, 1831 – May 16, 1899) was a farmer, businessman and political figure in Quebec. He represented Verchères in the Legislative Assembly of Quebec from 1881 to 1886 as a Liberal.

He was born in Saint-Mathieu-de-Beloeil, Lower Canada, the son of Abraham Bernard and Julie Préfontaine. Bernard was involved in the trade in hay and agricultural produce. In 1852, he married Apolline Vinet Souligny. His election in 1881 was overturned by the Quebec Superior Court in 1886 but he won the subsequent by-election. Bernard was defeated when he ran for reelection in 1886. He died in Saint-Mathieu-de-Beloeil at the age of 68.
