= Richelieu—Verchères (federal electoral district) =

Former federal electoral district in Quebec, Canada

Quebec electoral district

Defunct federal electoral district
- Legislature: House of Commons
- District created: 1933
- District abolished: 1967
- First contested: 1935
- Last contested: 1965

Richelieu—Verchères (French pronunciation: [ʁiʃ(ə)ljø vɛʁʃɛʁ]) was a federal electoral district in Quebec, Canada, that was represented in the House of Commons of Canada from 1935 to 1968.

This riding was created in 1933 from parts of Chambly—Verchères, Richelieu, St. Hyacinthe—Rouville and Yamaska ridings.

It was abolished in 1966 when it was redistributed into Chambly, Richelieu and Saint-Hyacinthe ridings.

== Members of Parliament ==
This riding elected the following members of Parliament:

Parliament	Years	Member	Party
Richelieu—Verchères; Riding created from Chambly—Verchères, Richelieu, St. Hyacinthe—Rouville and Yamaska
18th	1935–1940	Arthur Cardin	Liberal
19th	1940–1945	Arthur Cardin	Liberal
20th	1945–1946	Arthur Cardin	Independent
20th	1946–1949	Gérard Cournoyer	Liberal
21st	1949–1952	Gérard Cournoyer	Liberal
21st	1952–1953	Lucien Cardin	Liberal
22nd	1953–1957	Lucien Cardin	Liberal
23rd	1957–1958	Lucien Cardin	Liberal
24th	1958–1962	Lucien Cardin	Liberal
25th	1962–1963	Lucien Cardin	Liberal
26th	1963–1965	Lucien Cardin	Liberal
27th	1965–1967	Lucien Cardin	Liberal
27th	1967–1968	Jacques-Raymond Tremblay	Liberal
Riding dissolved into Chambly, Richelieu and Saint-Hyacinthe

== Election results ==
1935 Canadian federal election
Party	Candidate	Votes
Liberal	Pierre Joseph Arthur Cardin	11,022
Conservative	Joseph-Ignace Archambault	3,402

1940 Canadian federal election
Party	Candidate	Votes
Liberal	Pierre Joseph Arthur Cardin	11,330
National Government	Liboire Beauregard	2,412
Independent Conservative	René Larivière	447

1945 Canadian federal election
Party	Candidate	Votes
Independent	Pierre Joseph Arthur Cardin	12,873
Progressive Conservative	Alphonse Bourret	3,080
Social Credit	Rodolphe Bignell	945

By-election on 23 December 1946 On Cardin's death, 21 October 1946
Party	Candidate	Votes
Liberal	Gérard Cournoyer	11,984
Social Credit	J.-T.-Rolland Corbeil	6,164
Progressive Conservative	Étienne Duhamel	1,875

1949 Canadian federal election
Party	Candidate	Votes
Liberal	Gérard Cournoyer	12,795
National Unity	Adrien Arcand	5,590
Union des électeurs	Claude Guertin	429
Progressive Conservative	Paul-Émile Guertin	419

By-election on 6 October 1952 On Cournoyer's resignation, 5 July 1952
Party	Candidate	Votes
Liberal	Lucien Cardin	13,285
Progressive Conservative	Albéric Tremblay	4,374

1953 Canadian federal election
Party	Candidate	Votes
Liberal	Lucien Cardin	15,406
Progressive Conservative	François Cournoyer	3,282
Co-operative Commonwealth	Maurice Benoit	246

1957 Canadian federal election
Party	Candidate	Votes
Liberal	Lucien Cardin	16,003
Independent PC	Paul-Émile Guertin	2,830
Progressive Conservative	Jacques Bertrand	749

1958 Canadian federal election
Party	Candidate	Votes
Liberal	Lucien Cardin	13,497
Progressive Conservative	Charles Cournoyer	11,005

1962 Canadian federal election
Party	Candidate	Votes
Liberal	Lucien Cardin	14,658
Progressive Conservative	C.-Robert Fiset	9,790
Social Credit	Fernando Bissonnette	2,268

1963 Canadian federal election
Party	Candidate	Votes
Liberal	Lucien Cardin	14,194
Social Credit	Yvon Ménard	9,616
Progressive Conservative	Paul-Émile Guertin	1,795
New Democratic	Paul-Aimé Roy	936

1965 Canadian federal election
Party	Candidate	Votes
Liberal	Lucien Cardin	15,697
Ralliement créditiste	Yvon Ménard	5,317
Progressive Conservative	Paul-Émile Guertin	3,107
New Democratic	Paul-Aimé Roy	1,868

By-election on 29 May 1967 On Cardin's resignation, 4 April 1967
Party	Candidate	Votes
Liberal	Jacques-Raymond Tremblay	10,577
Progressive Conservative	Claude Ladouceur	3,104
New Democratic	Paul-Aimé Roy	1,178
Radical chrétien	Rolland Corbeil	1,089

== See also ==
- List of Canadian electoral districts
- Historical federal electoral districts of Canada
