= Joseph-Xavier Perrault =

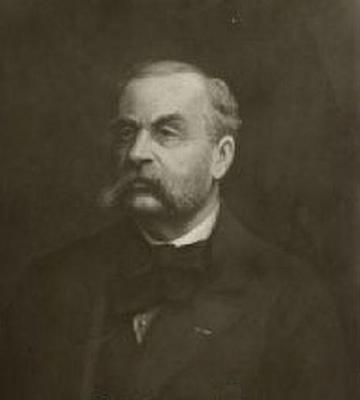
Joseph-Xavier Perrault

Joseph-Xavier Perrault (May 27, 1836 – April 7, 1905) was a Quebec educator and political figure.

== Biography ==
He was born in Quebec City in 1836, the grandson of Joseph-François Perrault. He studied at the Petit Séminaire de Québec, then the University of Durham and Royal Agricultural College in England and the École de Grignon in France. He attempted to set up agricultural schools on his return to the Province of Canada in 1857, but did not secure enough students. He also served as secretary for the Bureau of Agriculture and the Board of Agriculture of Lower Canada and served as editor for the Journal de l’agriculture et des travaux de la Chambre d’agriculture du Bas-Canada, an agricultural journal produced by the board. In 1863, he was elected to the Legislative Assembly of the Province of Canada for Richelieu. Perrault opposed Confederation. He was a member of the Association Saint-Jean-Baptiste de Montréal and served as its president. In 1885, he helped establish the Chambre de Commerce du District de Montréal, a Chamber of Commerce for Montreal, Quebec. He represented both the Chambre and the federal government at international exhibitions. Perrault was named a chevalier in the French Legion of Honour.

He died at Montreal in 1905 and was buried in the Notre Dame des Neiges Cemetery there.

1867 Canadian federal election: Richelieu
Party	Candidate	Votes
Conservative	Thomas McCarthy	777
Unknown	Joseph-Xavier Perrault	625
Unknown	P. Gélinas	450
Eligible voters		2,912
Source: Canadian Parliamentary Guide, 1871
