= Adélard Lanctôt =

Canadian lawyer and politician (1874–1919)

Adélard Lanctôt (February 13, 1874 – April 17, 1919) was a lawyer and political figure in Quebec. He represented Richelieu in the House of Commons of Canada from 1907 to 1911 as a Liberal.

He was born in St-Philippe de Laprairie, Quebec, the son of Louis Lanctôt and Rosalie Robidoux. Lanctôt was educated in Montreal and at the Université Laval. In 1902, he married Sarah Dery. Lanctôt practised law in Sorel. He was first elected to the House of Commons in a 1907 by-election held after Arthur Aimé Bruneau was named a judge. Lanctôt died in Sorel at the age of 45.

== Electoral record ==
By-election on 7 March 1907
| Party | Candidate | Votes |
| Liberal | Adélard Lanctôt | 2,467 |
| Liberal | A. O. Rondeau | 1,363 |

1908 Canadian federal election: Richelieu
| Party | Candidate | Votes |
|---|---|---|
| Liberal | Adélard Lanctôt | 2,468 |
| Conservative | Edward A. D. Morgan | 1,448 |
