= Georges-Isidore Barthe =

Canadian lawyer and politician (1834–1900)

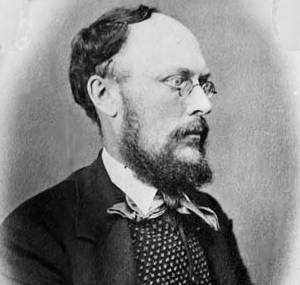
Georges-Isidore Barthe Source: Library and Archives Canada

Georges-Isidore Barthe (November 16, 1834 – August 11, 1900) was a Quebec lawyer, publisher, journalist, and political figure. He represented Richelieu in the House of Commons of Canada as an Independent Conservative from 1870 to 1872 and 1874 to 1878.

He was born Isidore Barthe in Restigouche (now Listuguj Mi'gmaq First Nation), Lower Canada, in 1834 and studied at the Séminaire de Nicolet. He articled in law and was called to the bar in 1856. With a partner, he published a newspaper Le Bas-Canada which advocated an independent Lower Canada; he went on to publish several other newspapers. Barthe was the first secretary-treasurer for Trois-Rivières in 1855 to 1857. In 1861, he married Joséphine-Charlotte, the daughter of Jean-Baptiste Meilleur. He was elected mayor of Sorel in 1864.

Barthe was elected to represent Richelieu in an 1870 by-election after the death of Thomas McCarthy; he was defeated in 1872 but reelected in 1874. In 1882, Barthe returned to Trois-Rivières. From 1887 to 1894, he served as magistrate in the district court of Trois-Rivières. In 1894, he founded L'Indépendance canadienne which advocated a more decentralized Canadian union. In 1897, he was named official translator for the House of Commons.

He died in Ottawa in 1900.

His brother Joseph-Guillaume was also a lawyer and journalist and was a member of the Legislative Assembly of the Province of Canada.

== Archives ==
There is a Georges-Isidore Barthe fonds at Library and Archives Canada. Archival reference number is R6110.

== Electoral record ==
By-election on 18 November 1870
Party	Candidate	Votes
Independent Conservative	Georges-Isidore Barthe	1,194
Unknown	J. G. Crébassa	849

1872 Canadian federal election: Richelieu
Party	Candidate	Votes
Conservative	Michel Mathieu	1,249
Independent Conservative	Georges-Isidore Barthe	1,108

1874 Canadian federal election: Richelieu
Party	Candidate	Votes
Independent Conservative	Georges-Isidore Barthe	1,320
Conservative	Michel Mathieu	1,119
Source: lop.parl.ca

1878 Canadian federal election: Richelieu
Party	Candidate	Votes
Liberal–Conservative	Louis Huet Massue	1,227
Independent Conservative	Georges-Isidore Barthe	1,117

1882 Canadian federal election: Richelieu
Party	Candidate	Votes
Liberal–Conservative	Louis Huet Massue	1,205
Independent Conservative	Georges-Isidore Barthe	927

Parliament of Canada
Preceded by Thomas McCarthy	Member of Parliament for Richelieu; 1870–1872	Succeeded by Michel Mathieu
Preceded by Michel Mathieu	Member of Parliament for Richelieu; 1874–1878	Succeeded by Louis Huet Massue
