= Joseph Daigle (Quebec politician) =

Canadian politician

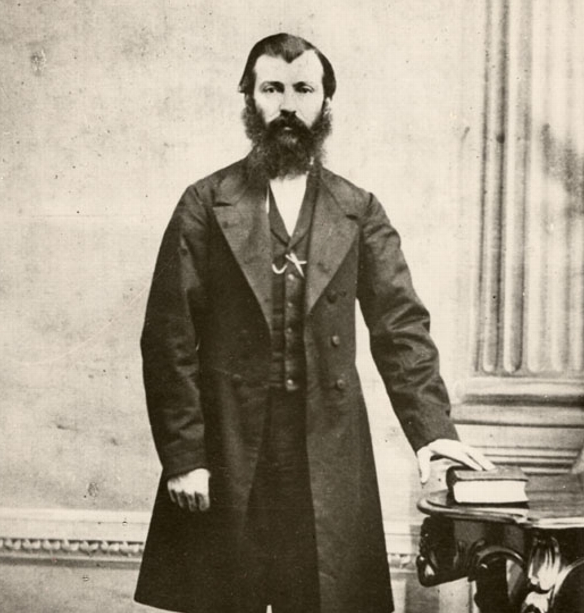

Member of the Legislative Assembly of Quebec for Verchères
- In office 1871–1878
- Preceded by: André-Boniface Craig
- Succeeded by: Jean-Baptiste Brousseau

Personal details
- Born: June 7, 1831 Saint-Ours, Lower Canada
- Died: March 12, 1908 (aged 76) Montreal, Quebec, Canada
- Party: Liberal

Joseph Daigle (June 7, 1831 – March 12, 1908) was a merchant, civil servant and political figure in Quebec. He represented Verchères in the Legislative Assembly of Quebec from 1871 to 1878 as a Liberal.

He was born in Saint-Ours, the son of François Daigle and Angèle Gareau. In 1858, he married Marie-Eugénie-Mélina Hertel de Rouville, the daughter of seigneur Jean-Baptiste-René Hertel de Rouville. Daigle was later employed by the Department of Immigration at Montreal. He died there at the age of 76.

His nephew Jean-Baptiste Brousseau also served as a member of the Quebec assembly.
