= Jean-Baptiste Labelle (politician) =

Canadian politician (1836–1887)

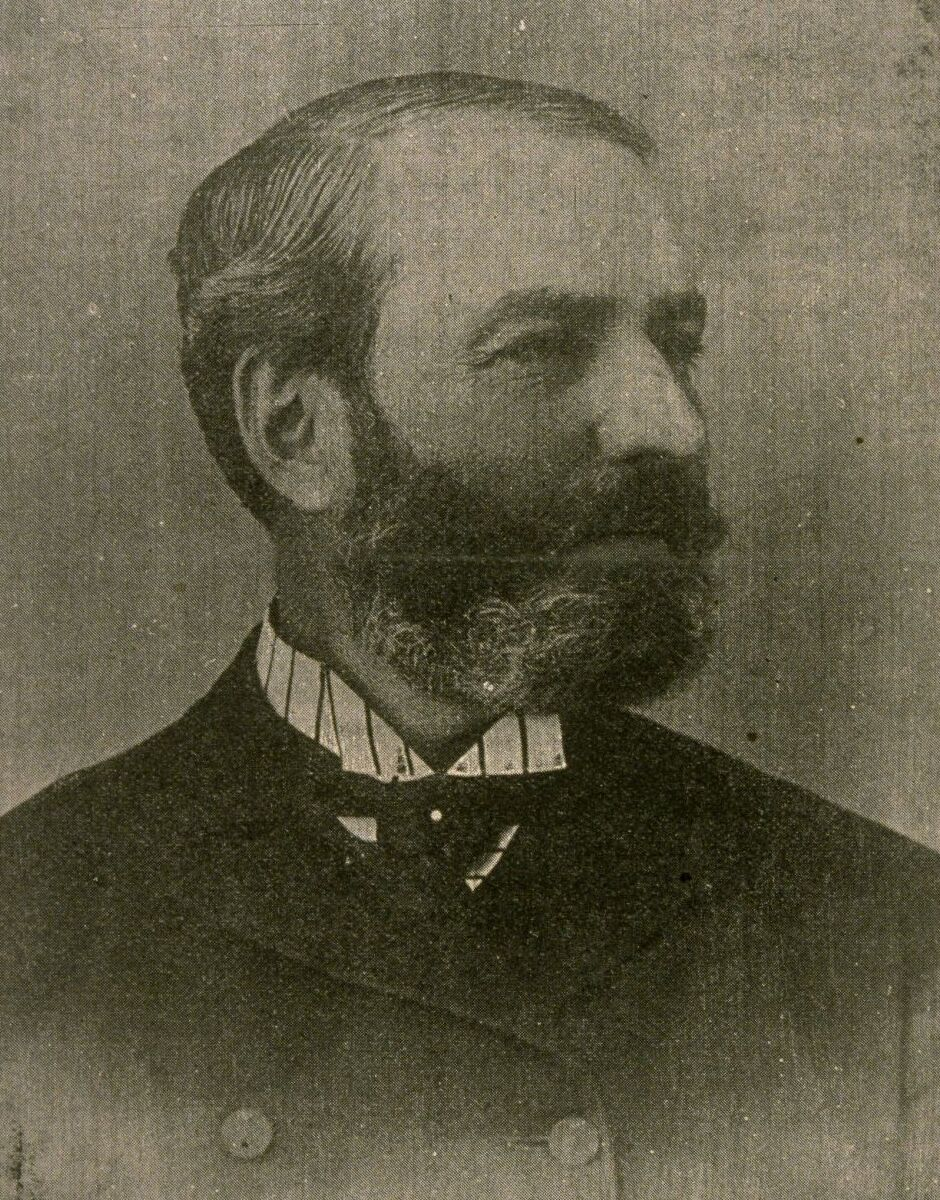
Jean-Baptiste Labelle

Jean-Baptiste Labelle (May 27, 1836 – August 3, 1887) was a Canadian ship captain, passenger

agent, and politician.

Born in Sorel, Lower Canada, the son of Toussaint Labelle and Marguerite Genton Dauphine, Labelle was educated in Sorel. He commanded a steamer for the Richelieu and Ontario Navigation Company for over twenty-five years. In 1880, he became a passenger agent for the Ottawa and Occidental Railway Company. In 1883, he was made general manager of the Richelieu and Ontario Navigation Company. In 1869, he was a defeated candidate for the Legislative Assembly of Quebec in a by-election in the electoral district of Richelieu. He was elected to the House of Commons of Canada for the electoral district of Richelieu in the 1887 election. A Conservative, he died in office five months later.
