= Joseph-François Perrault =

Canadian politician (1753–1844)

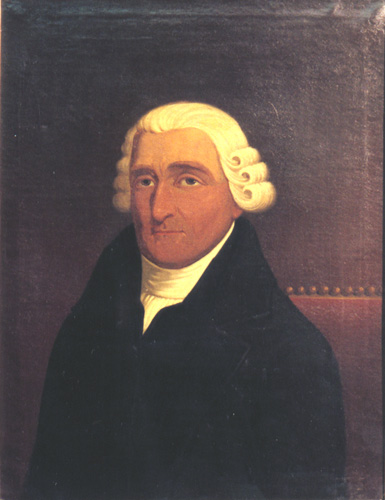
Portrait of Joseph Francois Perrault, by Louis Dulongpré (Château Ramezay)

Joseph-François Perrault (June 2, 1753 – April 5, 1844) was a businessman and political figure in Lower Canada.

== Early years ==
He was born in Quebec City in 1753, the son of fur trader Louis Perrault and grandson of François Perrault, and was brought to Trois-Rivières during the British attack on the town. In 1763, his father returned to Quebec City and left his children with his brother Jacques while he returned to France on business. Joseph-François studied at the Petit Séminaire de Québec. In 1772, he left the province to meet his father in New Orleans. When he arrived, his father was at St Louis, Missouri and they were finally reunited there in the spring of 1773.

== Career ==
In 1779, the younger Perrault was captured by native warriors allied with the British and brought to Detroit while traveling down the Ohio River with Colonel David Rogers and Captain Robert Benham. There, he met his uncle Jacques Baby, dit Dupéront. Unable to rejoin his father, Perrault began working for his uncle at Montreal. He later entered retail trade on his own, later leaving that business and becoming involved in various other activities, including teaching bookkeeping and translating legal publications. Perrault also became involved in theatre at Montreal with Pierre-Amable de Bonne. In 1795, he was named clerk of the peace and protonotary for the Court of King's Bench at Quebec. He was elected to the Legislative Assembly of Lower Canada for Huntingdon County in 1796; he was reelected in 1800. In 1806, he helped establish the Courier de Québec and was also involved in the production of the Le Vrai Canadien at Quebec. Although he was originally a strong supporter of the English party, Perrault became a moderate Reformer later in life; he opposed the use of force to secure political change.

Perrault was active in freemasonry, establishing a lodge at Quebec City and serving as deputy grand master for the province in 1816. He helped establish the Education Society of the District of Quebec to provide education for the town's poor children and served as its president. He also helped establish the British and Canadian School Society of the District of Quebec, an organization with similar aims.

== Death ==
He died at Quebec City in 1844.

== Family ==
His grandson Joseph-Xavier Perrault later served in the legislative assembly and also was involved in promoting education in the province.
