= Louis Huet Massue =

Canadian politician

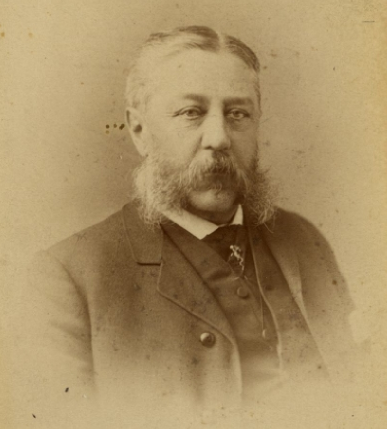
Louis Huet Massue

Louis Huet Massue (November 3, 1828 – June 17, 1891) was a farmer, seigneur and political figure in Quebec. He represented Richelieu in the House of Commons of Canada from 1878 to 1887 as a Liberal-Conservative member.

He was born in Varennes, Lower Canada, the son of Aignan-Aimé Massue, seigneur of Ste-Anne, and Celeste Richard. Massue was educated at the Collège Saint-Hyacinthe. In 1850, he married Esther Perrault. Massue was president of the Quebec Council of Agriculture. He owned the seigneuries of Trinité and St.-Michel. He died at Varennes at the age of 62.

1878 Canadian federal election: Richelieu
Party	Candidate	Votes
Liberal–Conservative	Louis Huet Massue	1,227
Independent Conservative	Georges-Isidore Barthe	1,117

1882 Canadian federal election: Richelieu
Party	Candidate	Votes
Liberal–Conservative	Louis Huet Massue	1,205
Independent Conservative	Georges-Isidore Barthe	927
