= Sainte-Anne de Varennes Basilica =

- Basilique Sainte-Anne-de-Varennes
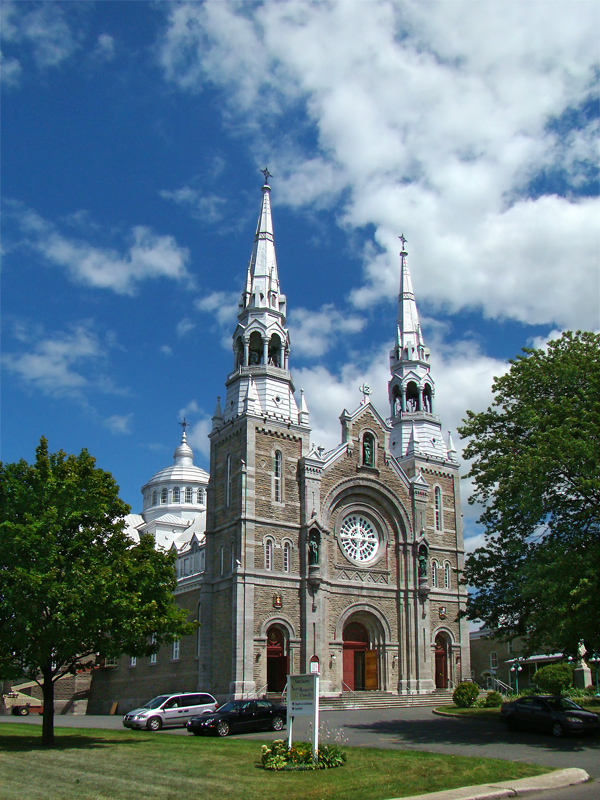
- Sainte-Anne de Varennes Basilica in 2010

- Location within Quebec
- 45°41′0″N 73°26′30″W
- Location: 30 Rue de la Fabrique, Varennes, Quebec; J3X 1R1
- Country: Canada
- Denomination: Roman Catholic
- Website: upmarguerite.ca

History
- Status: Basilica

Architecture
- Functional status: Active

Sainte-Anne de Varennes Basilica (French: Basilique Sainte-Anne-de-Varennes) is a Roman Catholic minor basilica dedicated to Saint Anne located in Varennes, Quebec, Canada. The basilica is under the circumscription of the Roman Catholic Diocese of Saint-Jean-Longueuil. The basilica was decreed on June 18, 1993.
