= Varennes, Quebec =

Varennes
- City
- Sainte-Anne de Varennes Basilica

- Coat of arms

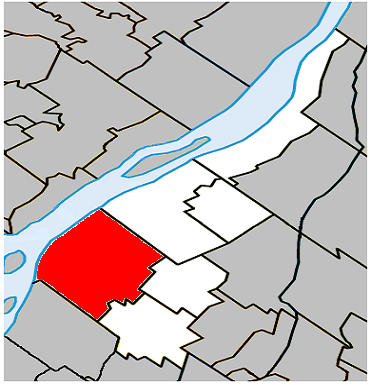
- Location within Marguerite-D'Youville RCM.

- Location in southern Quebec.
- Coordinates: 45°41′N 73°26′W
- Country: Canada
- Province: Quebec
- Region: Montérégie
- RCM: Marguerite-D'Youville
- Settled: 1672
- Constituted: August 26, 1972

Government
  - Mayor: Martin Damphousse
  - Federal riding: Pierre-Boucher—Les Patriotes—Verchères
  - Prov. riding: Verchères

Area
  - City: 114.40 km^{2} (44.17 sq mi)
  - Land: 94.80 km^{2} (36.60 sq mi)
  - Urban: 10.36 km^{2} (4.00 sq mi)
- Elevation: 19 m (62 ft)

Population (2021)
  - City: 21,198
  - Density: 223.6/km^{2} (579/sq mi)
  - Urban: 20,591
  - Urban density: 1,987.5/km^{2} (5,148/sq mi)
  - Pop 2016-2021: ▼0.3%
  - Dwellings: 8,538
- Time zone: UTC−5 (EST)
  - Summer (DST): UTC−4 (EDT)
- Postal code(s): J3X
- Area codes: 450 and 579
- Highways A-30: R-132
- Website: www.ville.varennes.qc.ca

Varennes (French pronunciation: [vaʁɛn]) is an off-island suburb of Montréal, in southwestern Quebec, Canada, on the Saint Lawrence River in the Marguerite-D'Youville Regional County Municipality. The city is approximately 24 kilometres (15 mi) from Downtown Montreal. The population as of the Canada 2011 Census was 20,994. In 2015, the population is listed at 24,000.

== History ==
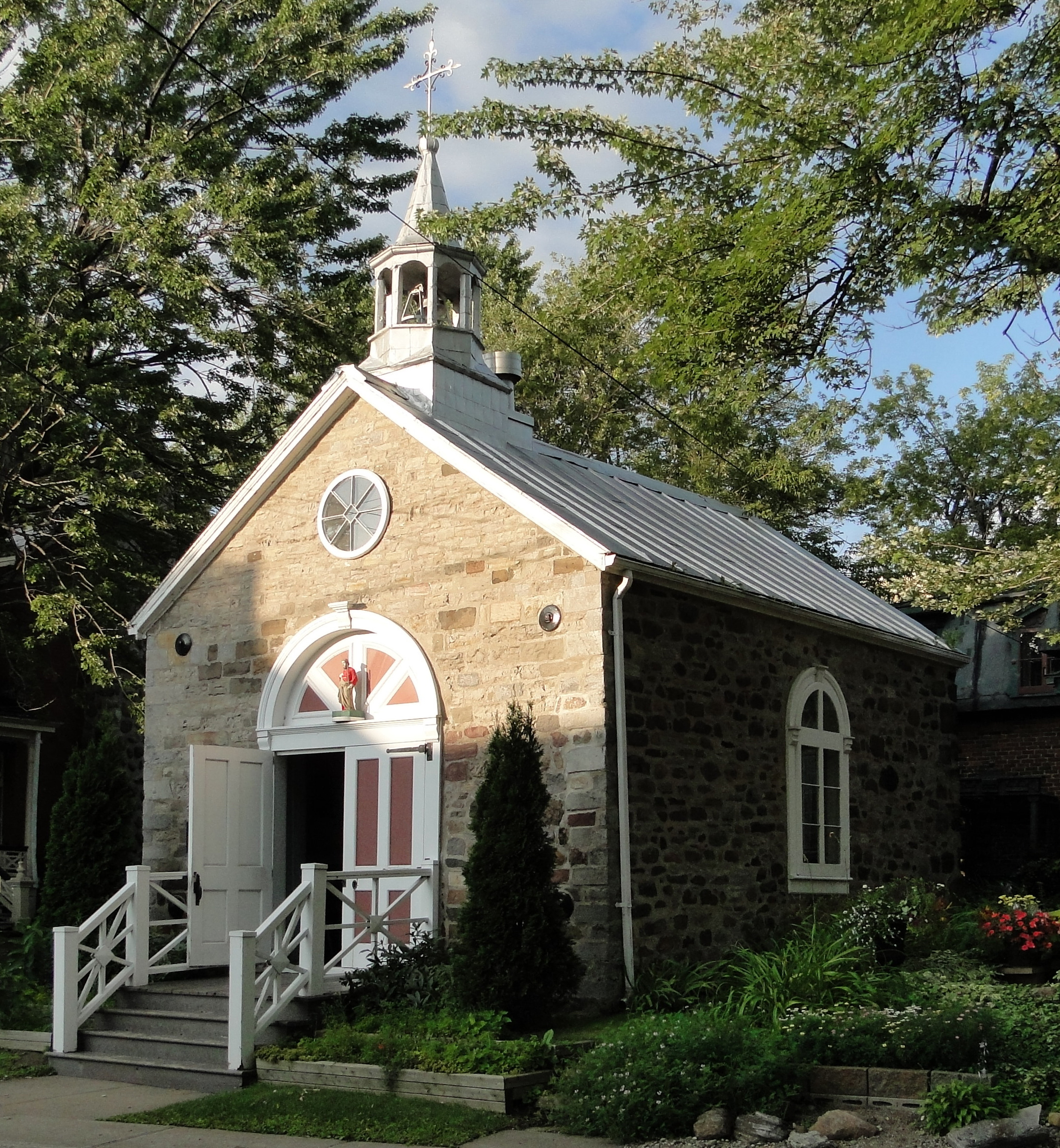
Saint-Joachim Chapel

The history of Varennes starts with the arrival of the Régiment de Carignan-Salières in New France. René Gaultier, sieur de Varennes, was given three concessions by intendant Jean Talon in 1672, le Tremblay, la Gabelle and Varennes. Jaques-René, one of his sons, was the second seigneur of Varennes. Five seignories later composed the Varennes parish. They were the seignories du Cap de Varennes, de l'île Sainte Thérèse, de Grand Maison, du Cap de la trinité and du Cap Saint-Michel. The town was captured by the British in 1760 during the Montreal Campaign. It was part of the Province of Quebec (1763–1791), then of Lower Canada, before it returned to being part of Quebec again in 1867 due to Canadian Confederation.

Varennes gained the status of city in 1972.

== Demographics ==
Historical Census Data - Varennes, Quebec
Year	Pop.	±%
1976	6,469	—
1981	8,764	+35.5%
1986	10,489	+19.7%
1991	14,758	+40.7%
1996	18,842	+27.7%
2001	19,653	+4.3%
2006	20,950	+6.6%
2011	20,994	+0.2%
2016	21,257	+1.3%
2021	21,198	−0.3%

In the 2021 Census of Population conducted by Statistics Canada, Varennes had a population of 21,198 living in 8,412 of its 8,538 total private dwellings, a change of −0.3% from its 2016 population of 21,257. With a land area of 94.8 km^{2} (36.6 sq mi), it had a population density of 223.6/km^{2} (579.1/sq mi) in 2021.

Canada census – Varennes, Quebec community profile

	2021	2016	2011
Population	21,198 (-0.3% from 2016)	21,257 (+1.3% from 2011)	20,994 (+0.2% from 2006)
Land area	94.80 km^{2} (36.60 sq mi)	94.41 km^{2} (36.45 sq mi)	92.53 km^{2} (35.73 sq mi)
Population density	223.6/km^{2} (579/sq mi)	225.2/km^{2} (583/sq mi)	226.9/km^{2} (588/sq mi)
Median age	42.4 (M: 41.2, F: 43.2)	41.1 (M: 40.4, F: 41.6)	39.5 (M: 38.7, F: 40.2)
Private dwellings	8,538 (total)	8,315 (total)	8,001 (total)
Median household income	$103,000	$90,315	$83,908

References: 2021 2016 2011

Canada Census Mother Tongue - Varennes, Quebec
Census	Total	French			English			French & English			Other		
Year	Responses	Count	Trend	Pop %	Count	Trend	Pop %	Count	Trend	Pop %	Count	Trend	Pop %
2021	21,075	19,855	▼1,7%	94.2%	315	▲1.6%	1.5%	225	▲87.5%	1.1%	555	▲30.6%	2.6%
2016	21,120	20,190	▲1,0%	95,6%	310	▼13.8%	1.5%	120	▼4.0%	0.6%	425	▲16,4%	2.0%
2011	20,835	19,985	▼0.1%	95.9%	360	▲18.0%	1.7%	125	▲177.8%	0.6%	365	▼11.0%	1.8%
2006	20,770	20,010	▲5.4%	96.3%	305	▼18.7%	1.5%	45	▲28.6%	0.2%	410	▲241.6%	2.0%
2001	19,520	18,990	▲4.0%	97.3%	375	▲31.6%	1.9%	35	▼63.2%	0.2%	120	▲100.0%	0.6%
1996	18,705	18,265	n/a	97.7%	285	n/a	1.5%	95	n/a	0.5%	60	n/a	0.3%

== Notable people ==
- Gilles Courteau
- Christophe-Alphonse Geoffrion
- Félix Geoffrion
- Marc-Amable Girard
- Sylvain Grenier
- Michel Laframboise
- Marie-Mai
- Louis Massue
- Philippe-François de Rastel de Rocheblave
- Théodore Robitaille
- Louis-Adélard Sénécal
- Marie-Marguerite d'Youville

== See also ==
- Marguerite-D'Youville Regional County Municipality
- Saint Lawrence River
- Saint-Charles River (Varennes)
- List of cities in Quebec
