= Results of the 2008 Canadian federal election by riding =

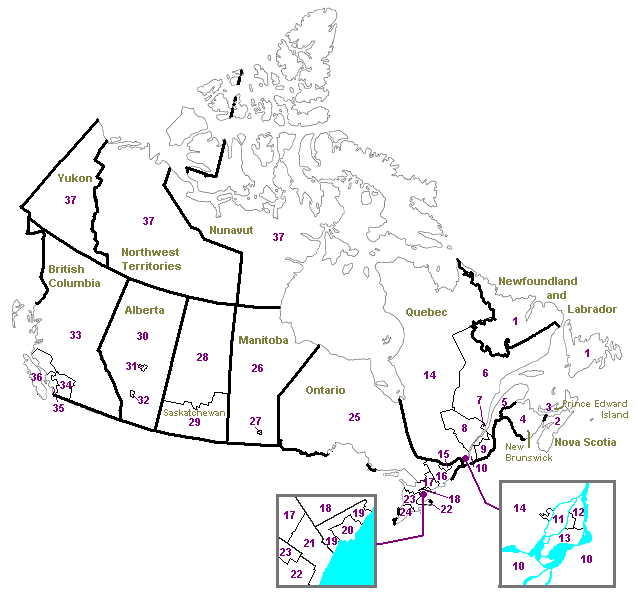
Canadian regions

Abbreviations guide

- (Ind.) - **Independent**
- (NA) - **No Affiliation**
- Minor parties:
  - (AAEVP) – **Animal Alliance Environment Voters Party of Canada**
  - (CAP) – **Canadian Action Party**
  - (CHP) – **Christian Heritage Party**
  - (Comm.) – **Communist Party**
  - (FPNP) – **First Peoples National Party of Canada**
  - (Libert.) – **Libertarian Party**
  - (Mar.) – **Marijuana Party**
  - (M-L) – **Marxist–Leninist Party**
  - (NFLP) – **Newfoundland and Labrador First Party**
  - (PC) – **Progressive Canadian Party**
  - (PPP) – **People's Political Power Party of Canada**
  - (Rhino.) – **Rhinoceros Party**
  - (WBP) – **Western Block Party**
  - (WLP) – **Work Less Party**

All candidate names are those on the official list of confirmed candidates; names in media or on party website may differ slightly.

Names in bold represent party leaders, cabinet ministers, and the Speaker of the House of Commons.
† represents that the incumbent chose not to run again.
§ represents that the incumbent was defeated for nomination.
‡ represents that the incumbent ran in a different district.

== Newfoundland and Labrador ==
Electoral district	Candidates					Incumbent
Electoral district	Conservative	Liberal	NDP	Green	Other	Incumbent
Avalon	Fabian Manning; 11,542; 35.16%	Scott Andrews; 14,866; 45.28%	Randy Wayne Dawe; 5,707; 17.38%	Dave Aylward; 714; 2.17%		Fabian Manning
Bonavista— Gander— Grand Falls— Windsor	Andrew House; 4,354; 15.23%	Scott Simms; 20,089; 70.27%	Jason Holley; 3,577; 12.51%	Robert Karl O'Connor; 568; 1.99%		Scott Simms
Humber— St. Barbe— Baie Verte	Lorne Robinson; 2,799; 10.63%	Gerry Byrne; 17,956; 68.22%	Mark Kennedy; 4,603; 17.49%		Wayne Ronald Bennett (NLFP); 964; 3.66%	Gerry Byrne
Labrador	Lacey Lewis; 615; 7.97%	Todd Russell; 5,426; 70.28%	Phyllis Artiss; 1,378; 17.85%	Nyssa Christine McLeod; 302; 3.91%		Todd Russell
Random— Burin— St. George's	Herb Davis; 4,791; 20.50%	Judy Foote; 12,557; 53.72%	Terry White; 5,553; 23.80%	Kaitlin Wainwright; 462; 1.98%		Bill Matthews†
St. John's East	Craig Westcott; 3,836; 9.26%	Walter Noel; 5,211; 12.58%	Jack Harris; 30,881; 74.55%	Howard Storey; 570; 1.38%	Les Coultas (NLFP); 347 0.84%	Norman Doyle†
St. John's East	Craig Westcott; 3,836; 9.26%	Walter Noel; 5,211; 12.58%	Jack Harris; 30,881; 74.55%	Howard Storey; 570; 1.38%	Shannon John Tobin (PC); 578 1.40%	Norman Doyle†
St. John's South— Mount Pearl	Merv Wiseman; 4,324; 12.56%	Siobhan Coady; 14,920; 43.32%	Ryan Cleary; 13,971; 40.57%	Ted Warren; 643; 1.87%	Terry Christopher Butler (Ind.); 179 0.52%	**Loyola Hearn**†
St. John's South— Mount Pearl	Merv Wiseman; 4,324; 12.56%	Siobhan Coady; 14,920; 43.32%	Ryan Cleary; 13,971; 40.57%	Ted Warren; 643; 1.87%	Greg Byrne (NLFP); 402 1.17%	**Loyola Hearn**†

== Prince Edward Island ==
Electoral district	Candidates					Incumbent
Electoral district	Conservative	Liberal	NDP	Green	Other	Incumbent
Cardigan	Sid McMullin; 5,661; 29.59%	Lawrence MacAulay; 10,105; 52.81%	Mike Avery; 1,556; 8.13%	Emma Daughton; 710; 3.71%	Larry McGuire (Ind.); 1,101; 5.75%	Lawrence MacAulay
Charlottetown	Tom DeBlois; 5,704; 32.11%	Shawn Murphy; 8,893; 50.06%	Brian Pollard; 2,187; 12.31%	Laura M. Bisaillon; 858; 4.83%	Baird Judson (CHP); 124; 0.70%	Shawn Murphy
Egmont	Gail Shea; 8,110; 43.93%	Keith Milligan; 8,055; 43.63%	Orville Lewis; 1,670; 9.05%	Rebecca Ridlington; 626; 3.39%		Joe McGuire†
Malpeque	Mary Crane; 7,388; 39.28%	Wayne Easter; 8,312; 44.19%	J'Nan Brown; 1,819; 9.67%	Peter Bevan-Baker; 1,291; 6.86%		Wayne Easter

== Nova Scotia ==
Electoral district	Candidates					Incumbent
Electoral district	Conservative	Liberal	NDP	Green	Other	Incumbent
Cape Breton— Canso	Allan Richard Murphy; 8,524; 23.50%	Rodger Cuzner; 17,447; 48.10%	Mark MacNeill; 7,660; 21.12%	Dwayne MacEachern; 2,641; 7.28%		Rodger Cuzner
Central Nova	**Peter Gordon MacKay**; 18,240; 46.60%		Mary Louise Lorefice; 7,659; 19.57%	Elizabeth May; 12,620; 32.24%	Paul Kemp (CAP); 196 0.50%	**Peter MacKay**
Central Nova	**Peter Gordon MacKay**; 18,240; 46.60%		Mary Louise Lorefice; 7,659; 19.57%	Elizabeth May; 12,620; 32.24%	Michael Harris MacKay (CHP); 427 1.09%	**Peter MacKay**
Cumberland— Colchester— Musquodoboit Valley	Joel E. Bernard; 3,493; 8.83%	Tracy Parsons; 3,344; 8.45%	Karen Olsson; 4,874; 12.32%		**Bill Casey** (Ind.); 27,303 69.01%	Bill Casey
Cumberland— Colchester— Musquodoboit Valley	Joel E. Bernard; 3,493; 8.83%	Tracy Parsons; 3,344; 8.45%	Karen Olsson; 4,874; 12.32%		Rick Simpson (Ind.); 550 1.39%	Bill Casey
Dartmouth— Cole Harbour	Wanda Webber; 9,109; 22.46%	Michael John Savage; 16,016; 39.49%	Brad Pye; 12,793; 31.55%	Paul Shreenan; 2,417; 5.96%	George Campbell (CHP); 219; 0.54%	Michael Savage
Halifax	Ted Larsen; 9,295; 20.61%	Catherine Meade; 12,458; 27.62%	Megan Leslie; 19,252; 42.69%	Darryl Whetter; 3,931; 8.72%	Tony Seed (M-L); 162; 0.36%	Alexa McDonough†
Halifax West	Rakesh Khosla; 8,708; 21.13%	Geoff Regan; 17,129; 41.56%	Tamara Lorincz; 12,201; 29.60%	Michael Munday; 2,920; 7.08%	Trevor Ennis (CHP); 257; 0.62%	Geoff Regan
Kings—Hants	Rosemary Segado; 9,846; 26.15%	Scott Brison; 16,641; 44.19%	Carol E. Harris; 8,291; 22.02%	Brendan MacNeill; 2,353; 6.25%	Jim Hnatiuk (CHP); 528; 1.40%	Scott Brison
Sackville— Eastern; Shore	David Montgomery; 8,198; 20.74%	Carolyn Scott; 5,018; 12.69%	Peter Stoffer; 24,279; 61.42%	Noreen Hartlen; 2,034; 5.15%		Peter Stoffer
South; Shore—St. Margaret's	Gerald Keddy; 14,388; 35.99%	Bill Smith; 9,536; 23.85%	Gordon S. Earle; 13,456; 33.65%	Michael Oddy; 2,090; 5.23%	Joe Larkin (CHP); 513; 1.28%	Gerald Keddy
Sydney— Victoria	Kristen Rudderham; 7,223; 20.62%	Mark Eyking; 17,303; 49.40%	Wayne McKay; 8,559; 24.44%	Collin Harker; 1,941; 5.54%		Mark Eyking
West Nova	Greg Kerr; 16,779; 39.94%	Robert Thibault; 15,185; 36.15%	George Barron; 7,097; 16.89%	Ronald Mills; 2,106; 5.01%	Cindy M. Nesbitt (Ind.); 844; 2.01%	Robert Thibault

== New Brunswick ==
Electoral district	Candidates					Incumbent
Electoral district	Conservative	Liberal	NDP	Green	Other	Incumbent
Acadie— Bathurst	Jean Guy Dubé; 8,331; 18.54%	Odette Robichaud; 9,850; 21.92%	Yvon Godin; 25,849; 57.53%	Michelle Aubin; 904; 2.01%		Yvon Godin
Beauséjour	Omer Leger; 12,506; 29.16%	Dominic LeBlanc; 20,059; 46.76%	Chris Durrant; 7,242; 16.88%	Michael Milligan; 3,087; 7.20%		Dominic LeBlanc
Fredericton	Keith Ashfield; 17,962; 42.53%	David Innes; 13,319; 31.54%	Jesse Travis; 6,490; 15.37%	Mary Lou Babineau; 4,293; 10.17%	Ben Kelly (CAP); 168; 0.40%	Andy Scott†
Fundy Royal	Rob Moore; 17,211; 51.63%	Mark Wright; 5,773; 17.32%	Rob Moir; 7,907; 23.72%	Erik Matthew Millett; 2,443; 7.33%		Rob Moore
Madawaska— Restigouche	Jean-Pierre Ouellet; 11,402; 33.23%	Jean-Claude JC D'Amours; 16,266; 47.40%	Thérèse Tremblay-Philippe; 5,361; 15.62%	André Arpin; 1,287; 3.75%		Jean-Claude D'Amours
Miramichi	Tilly O'Neill-Gordon; 12,058; 42.08%	Charles Hubbard; 10,590; 36.95%	Donald A. Doucet; 4,904; 17.11%	Todd Smith; 1,105; 3.86%		Charles Hubbard
Moncton— Riverview— Dieppe	Daniel Allain; 16,297; 35.83%	Brian Murphy; 17,797; 39.13%	Carl Bainbridge; 7,394; 16.26%	Alison Ménard; 3,998; 8.79%		Brian Murphy
New; Brunswick; Southwest	**Greg Thompson**; 17,474; 58.32%	Nancy MacIntosh; 5,863; 19.57%	Andrew Graham; 4,958; 16.55%	Robert Wayne Boucher; 1,667; 5.56%		**Greg Thompson**
Saint John	Rodney Weston; 13,782; 39.55%	Paul Zed; 13,285; 38.13%	Tony Mowery; 5,560; 15.96%	Mike Richardson; 1,888; 5.42%	Michael Moffat (Mar.); 330; 0.95%	Paul Zed
Tobique— Mactaquac	Mike Allen; 18,071; 57.40%	Sally McGrath; 6,773; 21.51%	Alice Finnamore; 4,830; 15.34%	Mark Glass; 1,810; 5.75%		Mike Allen

== Quebec ==
=== Eastern Quebec ===
Electoral district	Candidates						Incumbent
Electoral district	BQ	Conservative	Liberal	NDP	Green	Other	Incumbent
Gaspésie—Îles-de-la-Madeleine	Raynald Blais; 14,636; 40.10%	Darryl Gray; 8,334; 22.84%	Denis Gauvreau; 9,840; 26.96%	Gaston Langlais; 2,549; 6.98%	Julien Leblanc; 1,136; 3.11%		Raynald Blais
Haute-Gaspésie—La Mitis—Matane—Matapédia	Jean-Yves Roy; 11,984; 37.53%	Jérôme Landry; 5,771; 18.07%	Nancy Charest; 11,368; 35.60%	Julie Demers; 1,497; 4.69%	Louis Drainville; 1,139; 3.57%	Liliane Potvin (Ind.); 175; 0.55%	Jean-Yves Roy
Lévis—Bellechasse	Guy Bergeron; 13,747; 25.46%	Steven Blaney; 24,785; 45.90%	Pauline Côté; 8,130; 15.06%	Gabriel Biron; 5,856; 10.84%	Lynne Champoux-Williams; 1,370; 2.54%	Normand Fournier (M-L); 113; 0.21%	Steven Blaney
Montmagny—L'Islet—Kamouraska—Rivière-du-Loup	Paul Crête; 20,494; 46.03%	Denis Laflamme; 13,640; 30.64%	Jean Bouchard; 6,835; 15.35%	Gaston Hervieux; 2,428; 5.45%	Claude Gaumond; 978; 2.20%	Aubert Côté (CHP); 147; 0.33%	Paul Crête
Rimouski-Neigette—Témiscouata—Les Basques	Claude Guimond; 17,652; 44.69%	Gaston Noël; 7,216; 18.27%	Pierre Béland; 7,937; 20.09%	Guy Caron; 4,084; 10.34%	James D. Morrison; 645; 1.63%	Louise Thibault (Ind.); 1,966; 4.98%	Louise Thibault (Note: Left the Bloc québécois caucus in 2007 and sat as an Independent MP.)

=== Côte-Nord and Saguenay ===
Electoral district	Candidates					Incumbent
Electoral district	BQ	Conservative	Liberal	NDP	Green	Incumbent
Chicoutimi—Le Fjord	Robert Bouchard; 19,737; 41.31%	Jean-Guy Maltais; 16,680; 34.91%	Marc Pettersen; 6,425; 13.45%	Stéphane Girard; 3,742; 7.83%	Jean-François Veilleux; 1,193; 2.50%	Robert Bouchard
Jonquière—Alma	Chantale Bouchard; 19,035; 37.50%	**Jean-Pierre Blackburn**; 26,639; 52.48%	Marc Dupéré; 2,616; 5.15%	Jean-François Paradis; 2,475; 4.88%		**Jean-Pierre Blackburn**
Manicouagan	Gérard Asselin; 15,272; 49.29%	Pierre Breton; 8,374; 27.03%	Randy Jones; 4,737; 15.29%	Michaël Chicoine; 1,491; 4.81%	Jacques Gélineau; 1,112; 3.59%	Gérard Asselin
Montmorency—Charlevoix— Haute-Côte-Nord	Michel Guimond; 21,068; 48.88%	Guy-Léonard Tremblay; 11,789; 27.35%	Robert Gauthier; 5,769; 13.38%	Jonathan Tremblay; 3,332; 7.73%	Jacques Legros; 1,147; 2.66%	Michel Guimond
Roberval—Lac-Saint-Jean	Claude Pilote; 14,619; 39.65%	Denis Lebel; 16,055; 43.54%	Bernard Garneau; 3,721; 10.09%	Catherine Forbes; 1,738; 4.71%	Jocelyn Tremblay; 737; 2.00%	Denis Lebel

=== Quebec City ===
Electoral district	Candidates						Incumbent
Electoral district	BQ	Conservative	Liberal	NDP	Green	Other	Incumbent
Beauport—Limoilou	Éléonore Mainguy; 15,962; 32.61%	Sylvie Boucher; 17,994; 36.76%	Yves Picard; 7,030; 14.36%	Simon-Pierre Beaudet; 5,986; 12.23%	Luc Côté; 1,363; 2.78%	Simon Bédard (Ind.); 610; 1.25%	Sylvie Boucher
Charlesbourg—Haute-Saint-Charles	Denis Courteau; 14,602; 29.22%	Daniel Petit; 20,566; 41.15%	Denise Legros; 7,039; 14.08%	Anne-Marie Day; 6,542; 13.09%	François Bédard; 1,231; 2.46%		Daniel Petit
Louis-Hébert	Pascal-Pierre Paillé; 20,992; 36.23%	Luc Harvey; 16,343; 28.21%	Jean Beaupré; 13,669; 23.59%	Denis Blanchette; 5,403; 9.33%	Michelle Fontaine; 1,408; 2.43%	Stefan Jetchick (CHP); 119; 0.21%	Luc Harvey
Louis-Saint-Laurent	France Gagné; 13,330; 26.53%	**Josée Verner**; 23,683; 47.14%	Hélène H. Leone; 6,712; 13.36%	Alexandrine Latendresse; 5,252; 10.45%	Jean Cloutier; 1,260; 2.51%		**Josée Verner**
Québec	Christiane Gagnon; 21,064; 41.76%	Myriam Taschereau; 12,943; 25.66%	Damien Rousseau; 8,845; 17.54%	Catheryn Roy-Goyette; 5,933; 11.76%	Yonnel Bonaventure; 1,650; 3.27%		Christiane Gagnon

=== Central Quebec ===
Electoral district	Candidates						Incumbent
Electoral district	BQ	Conservative	Liberal	NDP	Green	Independent	Incumbent
Bas-Richelieu—Nicolet—Bécancour	Louis Plamondon; 26,821; 54.67%	Réjean Bériault; 8,904; 18.15%	Ghislaine Cournoyer; 7,987; 16.28%	Nourredine Seddiki; 4,010; 8.17%	Rebecca Laplante; 1,334; 2.72%		Louis Plamondon
Berthier—Maskinongé	Guy André; 24,945; 45.83%	Marie-Claude Godue; 12,078; 22.19%	Jean-Luc Matteau; 10,035; 18.44%	André Chauvette; 5,684; 10.44%	Denis Lefebvre; 1,691; 3.11%		Guy André
Joliette	Pierre Paquette; 28,040; 52.40%	Sylvie Lavallée; 9,540; 17.83%	Suzie St-Onge; 7,769; 14.52%	Francine Raynault; 5,579; 10.42%	Annie Durette; 2,588; 4.84%		Pierre Paquette
Lotbinière—Chutes-de-la-Chaudière	Antoine Sarrazin-Bourgoin; 12,738; 24.58%	Jacques Gourde; 24,495; 47.27%	Marie-Thérèse Hovington; 6,498; 12.54%	Raymond Côté; 6,828; 13.18%	Shirley Picknell; 1,265; 2.44%		Jacques Gourde
Montcalm	Roger Gaudet; 33,519; 55.69%	Claude Marc Boudreau; 8,096; 13.45%	David Grégoire; 8,387; 13.93%	Marie-Josée Beauchamp; 8,337; 13.85%	Michel Paulette; 1,854; 3.08%		Roger Gaudet
Portneuf—Jacques-Cartier	Richard Côté; 14,401; 32.02%		Stéphane Asselin; 7,320; 16.27%	André Turgeon; 5,707; 12.69%	Nathan John Weatherdon; 1,452; 3.23%	**André Arthur**; 15,063 33.49%	André Arthur
Portneuf—Jacques-Cartier	Richard Côté; 14,401; 32.02%		Stéphane Asselin; 7,320; 16.27%	André Turgeon; 5,707; 12.69%	Nathan John Weatherdon; 1,452; 3.23%	Jean Paradis; 1,039 2.31%	André Arthur
Repentigny	Nicolas Dufour; 31,007; 53.05%	Bruno Royer; 8,168; 13.98%	Robert Semegen; 8,751; 14.97%	Réjean Bellemare; 8,853; 15.15%	Paul W. Fournier; 1,666; 2.85%		Raymond Gravel†
Saint-Maurice—Champlain	Jean-Yves Laforest; 20,397; 43.96%	Stéphane Roof; 11,083; 23.89%	Ronald St-Onge Lynch; 9,755; 21.02%	Anne-Marie Aubert; 3,601; 7.76%	Martial Toupin; 1,562; 3.37%		Jean-Yves Laforest
Trois-Rivières	Paule Brunelle; 22,405; 45.27%	Claude Durand; 11,998; 24.24%	Marcos G. Simard; 9,008; 18.20%	Geneviève Boivin; 4,544; 9.18%	Ariane Blais; 1,540; 3.11%		Paule Brunelle

=== Eastern Townships ===
Electoral district	Candidates						Incumbent
Electoral district	BQ	Conservative	Liberal	NDP	Green	Other	Incumbent
Beauce	André Côté; 7,143; 13.98%	Maxime Bernier; 31,883; 62.41%	René Roy; 5,270; 10.32%	Véronique Poulin; 4,352; 8.52%	Nicolas Rochette; 2,436; 4.77%		Maxime Bernier
Brome—Missisquoi	Christian Ouellet; 17,561; 35.21%	Mark Quinlan; 9,309; 18.66%	Denis Paradis; 16,357; 32.79%	Christelle Bogosta; 4,514; 9.05%	Pierre Brassard; 1,784; 3.58%	David Marler (Ind.); 354; 0.71%	Christian Ouellet
Compton—Stanstead	France Bonsant; 20,332; 41.86%	Michel Gagné; 9,445; 19.44%	William Hogg; 10,946; 22.53%	Jean Rousseau; 5,483; 11.29%	Gary Caldwell; 2,368; 4.88%		France Bonsant
Drummond	Roger Pomerleau; 17,613; 38.79%	André Komlosy; 11,490; 25.31%	Jean Courchesne; 7,697; 16.95%	Annick Corriveau; 7,460; 16.43%	Réginald Gagnon; 1,144; 2.52%		Pauline Picard†
Mégantic—L'Érable	Pierre Turcotte; 12,283; 27.72%	**Christian Paradis**; 20,697; 46.70%	Nicole Champagne; 6,185; 13.96%	Bruno Vézina; 4,191; 9.46%	Jean-R. Guernon; 959; 2.16%		**Christian Paradis**
Richmond—Arthabaska	André Bellavance; 23,913; 46.02%	Éric Lefebvre; 15,080; 29.02%	Gwyneth Helen Grant; 6,599; 12.70%	Stéphane Ricard; 4,509; 8.68%	François Fillion; 1,337; 2.57%	Jean Landry (Ind.); 526; 1.01%	André Bellavance
Saint-Hyacinthe—Bagot	Ève-Mary Thaï Thi Lac; 22,719; 47.36%	René Vincelette; 10,195; 21.25%	Denise Tremblay; 6,649; 13.86%	Brigitte Sansoucy; 6,721; 14.01%	Jacques Tétreault; 1,682; 3.51%		Ève-Mary Thaï Thi Lac
Shefford	Robert Vincent; 21,650; 42.82%	Jean Lambert; 9,927; 19.63%	Bernard Demers; 10,810; 21.38%	Simon Gnocchini Messier; 6,323; 12.51%	Michel.M. Champagne; 1,848; 3.66%		Robert Vincent
Sherbrooke	Serge Cardin; 25,502; 50.08%	André Bachand; 8,331; 16.36%	Nathalie Goguen; 9,947; 19.53%	Yves Mondoux; 6,676; 13.11%		Sébastien Côrriveau (Rhino.); 467; 0.92%	Serge Cardin

=== Montérégie ===
Electoral district	Candidates						Incumbent
Electoral district	BQ	Conservative	Liberal	NDP	Green	Other	Incumbent
Beauharnois—Salaberry	Claude Debellefeuille; 26,904; 50.07%	Dominique Bellemare; 10,858; 20.21%	Maria Lopez; 7,995; 14.88%	Anne Minh Thu Quach; 6,214; 11.56%	David Smith; 1,764; 3.28%		Claude DeBellefeuille
Brossard—La Prairie	Marcel Lussier; 19,034; 32.47%	Maurice Brossard; 11,062; 18.87%	Alexandra Mendes; 19,103; 32.59%	Hoang Mai; 7,452; 12.71%	Sonia Ziadé; 1,816; 3.10%	Normand Chouinard (M-L); 157; 0.27%	Marcel Lussier
Chambly—Borduas	Yves Lessard; 31,773; 50.08%	Suzanne Chartrand; 9,564; 15.07%	Gabriel Arsenault; 10,649; 16.78%	Serge Gélinas; 8,998; 14.18%	Olivier Adam; 2,460; 3.88%		Yves Lessard
Châteauguay—Saint-Constant	Carole Freeman; 25,086; 45.58%	Pierre-Paul Routhier; 9,827; 17.86%	Linda Schwey; 10,104; 18.36%	Sonia Jurado; 8,261; 15.01%	Brian Sarwer-Foner; 1,755; 3.19%		Carole Freeman
Longueuil—Pierre-Boucher	Jean Dorion; 23,118; 46.12%	Jacques Bouchard; 7,210; 14.38%	Ryan Hillier; 10,920; 21.79%	Lise St-Denis; 7,021; 14.01%	Danielle Moreau; 1,752; 3.50%	Serge Patenaude (M-L); 103; 0.21%	Caroline St-Hilaire†
Saint-Bruno—Saint-Hubert	Carole Lavallée; 23,767; 44.99%	Nicole Charbonneau Baron; 8,125; 15.38%	Pierre Diamond; 11,755; 22.25%	Vesna Vesic; 7,154; 13.54%	Simon Bernier; 2,031; 3.84%		Carole Lavallée
Saint-Jean	Claude Bachand; 26,506; 49.61%	Marie-Josée Mercier; 9,281; 17.37%	Claire Ste-Marie; 9,430; 17.65%	Philippe Refghi; 5,529; 10.35%	Pierre Tremblay; 2,160; 4.04%	Guy Berger (Ind.); 520; 0.97%	Claude Bachand
Saint-Lambert	Josée Beaudin; 16,346; 37.63%	Patrick Clune; 6,867; 15.81%	Roxane Stanners; 12,383; 28.50%	Richard Marois; 6,280; 14.46%	Diane Joubert; 1,566; 3.60%		Vacant
Vaudreuil-Soulanges	Meili Faille; 27,044; 41.34%	**Michael M. Fortier**; 15,496; 23.69%	Brigitte Legault; 13,954; 21.33%	Maxime Héroux-Legault; 6,298; 9.62%	Jean-Yves Massenet; 2,625; 4.01%		Meili Faille
Verchères—Les Patriotes	Luc Malo; 27,602; 50.85%	Benoît Dussault; 7,742; 14.26%	François Fournier; 8,871; 16.34%	Raphaël Fortin; 8,388; 15.45%	Annie Morel; 1,679; 3.09%		Luc Malo

=== Eastern Montreal ===
Electoral district	Candidates								Incumbent
Electoral district	BQ	Conservative	Liberal	NDP	Green	Marxist-Leninist	Rhinoceros	Other	Incumbent
Hochelaga	Réal Ménard; 22,720; 49.73%	Luc Labbé; 4,201; 9.20%	Diane Dicaire; 9,442; 20.67%	Jean-Claude Rocheleau; 6,600; 14.45%	Philippe Larochelle; 1,946; 4.26%	Christine Dandenault; 177; 0.39%	Simon Landry; 230; 0.50%	Marianne Breton-Fontaine (Comm.); 184 0.40%	Réal Ménard
Hochelaga	Réal Ménard; 22,720; 49.73%	Luc Labbé; 4,201; 9.20%	Diane Dicaire; 9,442; 20.67%	Jean-Claude Rocheleau; 6,600; 14.45%	Philippe Larochelle; 1,946; 4.26%	Christine Dandenault; 177; 0.39%	Simon Landry; 230; 0.50%	Blair T. Longley (Mar.); 183 0.40%	Réal Ménard
Honoré-Mercier	Gérard Labelle; 13,871; 28.12%	Rodrigo Alfaro; 7,549; 15.30%	Pablo Rodriguez; 21,544; 43.67%	François Pilon; 4,986; 10.11%	Gaëtan Bérard; 1,380; 2.80%				Pablo Rodriguez
La Pointe-de-l'Île	Francine Lalonde; 25,976; 56.09%	Hubert Pichet; 5,179; 11.18%	Oumy Sarr; 7,403; 15.99%	Isabelle Maguire; 5,975; 12.90%	Domita Cundari; 1,340; 2.89%	Claude Brunelle; 177; 0.38%	Ben 97 Benoit; 261; 0.56%		Francine Lalonde
Laurier—Sainte-Marie	**Gilles Duceppe**; 24,103; 50.24%	Charles K. Langford; 2,320; 4.84%	Sébastien Caron; 8,798; 18.34%	François Grégoire; 8,209; 17.11%	Dylan Perceval-Maxwell; 3,801; 7.92%	Serge Lachapelle; 118; 0.25%	François Yo Gourd; 447; 0.93%	Daniel "F4J" Laforest (Ind.); 93 0.19%	**Gilles Duceppe**
Laurier—Sainte-Marie	**Gilles Duceppe**; 24,103; 50.24%	Charles K. Langford; 2,320; 4.84%	Sébastien Caron; 8,798; 18.34%	François Grégoire; 8,209; 17.11%	Dylan Perceval-Maxwell; 3,801; 7.92%	Serge Lachapelle; 118; 0.25%	François Yo Gourd; 447; 0.93%	Samie Pagé-Quirion (Comm.); 86 0.18%	**Gilles Duceppe**
Rosemont—La Petite-Patrie	Bernard Bigras; 27,260; 52.00%	Sylvie Boulianne; 3,876; 7.39%	Marjorie Théodore; 9,785; 18.67%	Alexandre Boulerice; 8,522; 16.26%	Vincent Larochelle; 2,406; 4.59%	Stéphane Chénier; 170; 0.32%	Jean-Patrick Berthiaume; 319; 0.61%	Michel Dugré (NA); 83; 0.16%	Bernard Bigras

=== Western Montreal ===
Electoral district	Candidates							Incumbent
Electoral district	BQ	Conservative	Liberal	NDP	Green	Marxist-Leninist	Other	Incumbent
Jeanne-Le Ber	Thierry St-Cyr; 17,144; 34.91%	Daniel Beaudin; 5,494; 11.19%	Christian P. Feuillette; 15,841; 32.26%	Daniel Breton; 7,708; 15.70%	Véronik Sansoucy; 2,345; 4.78%		Darryl Gray (Ind.); 577; 1.17%	Thierry St-Cyr
Lac-Saint-Louis	Maxime Clément; 2,953; 5.75%	Andrea Paine; 12,085; 23.51%	Francis Scarpaleggia; 23,842; 46.39%	Daniel Quinn; 8,105; 15.77%	Peter Graham; 4,415; 8.59%			Francis Scarpaleggia
LaSalle—Émard	Frédéric Isaya; 10,384; 24.47%	Béatrice Guay-Pepper; 6,802; 16.03%	Lise Zarac; 17,226; 40.60%	Amy Darwish; 5,622; 13.25%	Kristina Vitelli; 1,579; 3.72%	Yves Le Seigle; 144; 0.34%	Antoine Kaluzny (Ind.); 674; 1.59%	Paul Martin†
Mount Royal	Maryse Lavallée; 1,543; 4.36%	Rafael Tzoubari; 9,676; 27.33%	Irwin Cotler; 19,702; 55.65%	Nicolas Thibodeau; 2,733; 7.72%	Tyrell Alexander; 1,565; 4.42%	Diane Johnston; 97; 0.27%	Antonio Artuso (Comm.); 89; 0.25%	Irwin Cotler
Notre-Dame-de-Grâce—Lachine	Eric Taillefer; 6,962; 15.89%	Carmine Pontillo; 7,108; 16.22%	Marlene Jennings; 19,554; 44.62%	Peter Deslauriers; 6,641; 15.16%	Jessica Gal; 3,378; 7.71%	Rachel Hoffman; 177; 0.40%		Marlene Jennings
Outremont	Marcela Valdivia; 4,554; 12.55%	Lulzim Laloshi; 3,820; 10.53%	Sébastien Dhavernas; 12,005; 33.08%	Thomas Mulcair; 14,348; 39.53%	F. Monsieur Corde à Linge Pilon; 1,566; 4.31%			Thomas Mulcair
Pierrefonds—Dollard	Reny Gagnon; 4,357; 9.53%	Pierre-Olivier Brunelle; 11,815; 25.83%	Bernard Patry; 21,468; 46.94%	Shameem Siddiqui; 4,823; 10.55%	Ryan Young; 3,161; 6.91%	Marsha Fine; 111; 0.24%		Bernard Patry
Saint-Laurent—Cartierville	Jacques Lachaîne; 4,611; 11.34%	Dennis Galiatsatos; 6,999; 17.21%	**Stéphane Dion**; 25,095; 61.72%	Jerome Rodrigues; 3,654; 8.99%		Fernand Deschamps; 299; 0.74%		**Stéphane Dion**
Westmount—Ville-Marie	Charles Larivée; 2,818; 7.26%	Guy Dufort; 6,139; 15.81%	Marc Garneau; 18,041; 46.47%	Anne Lagacé Dowson; 8,904; 22.93%	Claude William Genest; 2,733; 7.04%	Linda Sullivan; 49; 0.13%	David Sommer Rovins (Ind.); 47 0.12%	Vacant
Westmount—Ville-Marie	Charles Larivée; 2,818; 7.26%	Guy Dufort; 6,139; 15.81%	Marc Garneau; 18,041; 46.47%	Anne Lagacé Dowson; 8,904; 22.93%	Claude William Genest; 2,733; 7.04%	Linda Sullivan; 49; 0.13%	Bill Sloan (Comm.); 34 0.09%	Vacant
Westmount—Ville-Marie	Charles Larivée; 2,818; 7.26%	Guy Dufort; 6,139; 15.81%	Marc Garneau; 18,041; 46.47%	Anne Lagacé Dowson; 8,904; 22.93%	Claude William Genest; 2,733; 7.04%	Linda Sullivan; 49; 0.13%	Judith Vienneau (Rhino.); 62 0.16%	Vacant

=== Northern Montreal and Laval ===
Electoral district	Candidates						Incumbent
Electoral district	BQ	Conservative	Liberal	NDP	Green	Other	Incumbent
Ahuntsic	Maria Mourani; 18,815; 39.49%	Jean Précourt; 4,937; 10.36%	Eleni Bakopanos; 18,392; 38.60%	Alexandra Bélec; 4,276; 8.97%	Lynette Tremblay; 1,228; 2.58%		Maria Mourani
Alfred-Pellan	Robert Carrier; 20,686; 38.83%	Alexandre Salameh; 8,626; 16.26%	Wilson Saintelmy; 15,594; 29.27%	Cynthia Roy; 6,406; 12.03%	Tristan Desjardins Drouin; 1,665; 3.13%	Régent Millette (Ind.); 259; 0.49%	Robert Carrier
Bourassa	Daniel Mailhot; 10,145; 25.42%	Michelle Allaire; 5,405; 13.55%	Denis Coderre; 19,869; 49.79%	Samira Laouni; 3,188; 7.99%	François Boucher; 1,166; 2.92%	Geneviève Royer (M-L); 130; 0.33%	Denis Coderre
Laval	Nicole Demers; 19,085; 37.80%	Jean-Pierre Bélisle; 9,101; 18.02%	Alia Haddad; 14,190; 28.10%	Alain Giguère; 6,289; 12.46%	Eric Madelein; 1,607; 3.18%	Yvon Breton (M-L); 221; 0.44%	Nicole Demers
Laval—Les Îles	Mohamedali Jetha; 12,576; 23.55%	Agop Evereklian; 11,017; 20.63%	Raymonde Folco; 21,603; 40.45%	Zahia El-Masri; 6,124; 11.47%	Brent Niel; 1,752; 3.28%	Sylvain A. Trottier (Rhino.); 336; 0.63%	Raymonde Folco
Marc-Aurèle-Fortin	Serge Ménard; 25,552; 45.53%	Claude Moreau; 7,759; 13.82%	Robert Frégeau; 13,728; 24.46%	Benoît Beauchamp; 6,907; 12.31%	Lise Bissonnette; 2,178; 3.88%		Serge Ménard
Papineau	Vivian Barbot; 16,535; 38.69%	Mustaque Sarker; 3,262; 7.63%	Justin Trudeau; 17,724; 41.47%	Costa Zafiropoulos; 3,734; 8.74%	Ingrid Hein; 1,213; 2.84%	Mahmood Raza Baig (Ind.); 267; 0.62%	Vivian Barbot
Saint-Léonard—Saint-Michel	Farid Salem; 5,146; 13.61%	Lucie Le Tourneau; 5,627; 14.88%	Massimo Pacetti; 21,652; 57.26%	Laura Colella; 4,039; 10.68%	Frank Monteleone; 1,063; 2.81%	Garnet Colly (M-L); 165 0.44%	Massimo Pacetti
Saint-Léonard—Saint-Michel	Farid Salem; 5,146; 13.61%	Lucie Le Tourneau; 5,627; 14.88%	Massimo Pacetti; 21,652; 57.26%	Laura Colella; 4,039; 10.68%	Frank Monteleone; 1,063; 2.81%	Joseph Young (NA); 122 0.32%	Massimo Pacetti

=== Laurentides, Outaouais and Northern Quebec ===
Electoral district	Candidates							Incumbent
Electoral district	BQ	Conservative	Liberal	NDP	Green	Marxist-Leninist	Independent	Incumbent
Abitibi—Baie-James— Nunavik—Eeyou	Yvon Lévesque; 10,995; 39.65%	Jean-Maurice Matte; 8,422; 30.37%	Mark Canada; 5,108; 18.42%	Erica Martin; 2,276; 8.21%	Patrick Rancourt; 928; 3.35%			Yvon Lévesque
Abitibi—Témiscamingue	Marc Lemay; 20,929; 47.91%	Pierre Grandmaitre; 8,267; 18.93%	Gilbert Barrette; 9,055; 20.73%	Christine Moore; 4,151; 9.50%	Bruno Côté; 976; 2.23%		Ghislain Loiselle; 302; 0.69%	Marc Lemay
Argenteuil—Papineau—Mirabel	Mario Laframboise; 26,455; 48.10%	Scott Pearce; 9,584; 17.43%	André Robert; 9,984; 18.15%	Alain Senécal; 6,819; 12.40%	Pierre Audette; 2,055; 3.74%	Christian-Simon Ferlatte; 98; 0.18%		Mario Laframboise
Gatineau	Richard Nadeau; 15,189; 29.15%	Denis Tassé; 8,762; 16.82%	Michel Simard; 13,193; 25.32%	Françoise Boivin; 13,612; 26.13%	David Inglis; 1,342; 2.58%			Richard Nadeau
Hull—Aylmer	Raphaël Déry; 11,625; 22.05%	Paul Fréchette; 7,996; 15.16%	Marcel Proulx; 19,750; 37.45%	Pierre Ducasse; 10,454; 19.83%	Frédéric Pouyot; 2,784; 5.28%	Gabriel Girard-Bernier; 121; 0.23%		Marcel Proulx
Laurentides—Labelle	Johanne Deschamps; 24,956; 47.08%	Guy Joncas; 6,914; 13.04%	Pierre Gfeller; 14,143; 26.68%	David Dupras; 4,896; 9.24%	Jacques Rigal; 2,094; 3.95%			Johanne Deschamps
Pontiac	Marius Tremblay; 9,576; 22.34%	Lawrence Cannon; 14,023; 32.71%	Cindy Duncan McMillan; 10,396; 24.25%	Céline Brault; 6,616; 15.43%	André Sylvestre; 2,148; 5.01%	Benoit Legros; 112; 0.26%		**Lawrence Cannon**
Rivière-des-Mille-Îles	Luc Desnoyers; 23,216; 45.68%	Claude Carignan; 9,911; 19.50%	Denis Joannette; 8,823; 17.36%	Normand Beaudet; 6,741; 13.26%	Marie Martine Bédard; 2,134; 4.20%			Gilles Perron†
Rivière-du-Nord	Monique Guay; 26,588; 53.57%	Gilles Duguay; 7,170; 14.45%	Joao Neves; 6,755; 13.61%	Simon Bernier; 7,187; 14.48%	René Piché; 1,656; 3.34%		Jocelyne Leduc; 273; 0.55%	Monique Guay
Terrebonne—Blainville	Diane Bourgeois; 28,303; 52.35%	Daniel Lebel; 7,551; 13.97%	Eva Nassif; 8,937; 16.53%	Michel Le Clair; 7,278; 13.46%	Martin Drapeau; 1,714; 3.17%		M. Zamboni Cadieux; 283; 0.52%	Diane Bourgeois

== Ontario ==
=== Ottawa ===
Electoral district	Candidates					Incumbent
Electoral district	Conservative	Liberal	NDP	Green	Other	Incumbent
Carleton—Mississippi Mills	Gordon O'Connor; 39,433; 57.77%	Justin MacKinnon; 15,254; 22.35%	Paul Arbour; 6,583; 9.64%	Jake Cole; 6,983; 10.23%		Gordon O'Connor
Nepean—Carleton	Pierre Poilievre; 39,921; 55.84%	Ed Mahfouz; 16,743; 23.42%	Phil Brown; 6,946; 9.72%	Lori Gadzala; 7,880; 11.02%		Pierre Poilievre
Ottawa Centre	Brian McGarry; 15,065; 23.57%	Penny Collenette; 16,633; 26.02%	Paul Dewar; 25,399; 39.74%	Jen Hunter; 6,348; 9.93%	John Andrew Akpata (Mar.); 378 0.59%	Paul Dewar
Ottawa Centre	Brian McGarry; 15,065; 23.57%	Penny Collenette; 16,633; 26.02%	Paul Dewar; 25,399; 39.74%	Jen Hunter; 6,348; 9.93%	Pierre Soublière (M-L); 95 0.15%	Paul Dewar
Ottawa—Orléans	Royal Galipeau; 27,244; 44.91%	Marc Godbout; 23,549; 38.82%	Amy O'Dell; 6,025; 9.93%	Paul Maillet; 3,845; 6.34%		Royal Galipeau
Ottawa South	Elie Salibi; 19,417; 33.38%	David McGuinty; 29,035; 49.91%	Hijal De Sarkar; 4,920; 8.46%	Qais Ghanem; 3,939; 6.77%	Jean-Serge Brisson (Libert.); 244 0.42%	David McGuinty
Ottawa South	Elie Salibi; 19,417; 33.38%	David McGuinty; 29,035; 49.91%	Hijal De Sarkar; 4,920; 8.46%	Qais Ghanem; 3,939; 6.77%	Al Gullon (PC); 620 1.07%	David McGuinty
Ottawa—Vanier	Patrick Glémaud; 14,138; 27.28%	Mauril Bélanger; 23,948; 46.20%	Trevor Haché; 8,845; 17.06%	Akbar Manoussi; 4,447; 8.58%	Christian Legeais (M-L); 130 0.25%	Mauril Bélanger
Ottawa—Vanier	Patrick Glémaud; 14,138; 27.28%	Mauril Bélanger; 23,948; 46.20%	Trevor Haché; 8,845; 17.06%	Akbar Manoussi; 4,447; 8.58%	Michel St-Onge (CAP); 100 0.19%	Mauril Bélanger
Ottawa—Vanier	Patrick Glémaud; 14,138; 27.28%	Mauril Bélanger; 23,948; 46.20%	Trevor Haché; 8,845; 17.06%	Akbar Manoussi; 4,447; 8.58%	Robert Taylor-Larter (Ind.); 227 0.44%	Mauril Bélanger
Ottawa West—Nepean	John Baird; 25,109; 44.98%	David Pratt; 20,161; 36.12%	Marlene Rivier; 6,432; 11.52%	Francis Coates; 3,558; 6.37%	Alex McDonald (Comm.); 150 0.27%	John Baird
Ottawa West—Nepean	John Baird; 25,109; 44.98%	David Pratt; 20,161; 36.12%	Marlene Rivier; 6,432; 11.52%	Francis Coates; 3,558; 6.37%	David Page (Ind.); 414 0.74%	John Baird

=== Eastern Ontario ===
Electoral district	Candidates					Incumbent
Electoral district	Conservative	Liberal	NDP	Green	Other	Incumbent
Glengarry— Prescott— Russell	Pierre Lemieux; 25,659; 47.30%	Dan Boudria; 19,997; 36.87%	Jean-Sébastien Caron; 5,678; 10.47%	Sylvie Lemieux; 2,908; 5.36%		Pierre Lemieux
Kingston and the Islands	Brian Abrams; 18,895; 32.54%	**Peter Milliken**; 22,734; 39.15%	Rick Downes; 10,158; 17.49%	Eric Walton; 6,282; 10.82%		**Peter Milliken**
Lanark— Frontenac— Lennox and Addington	Scott Reid; 30,272; 55.88%	David Remington; 11,809; 21.80%	Sandra Willard; 7,112; 13.13%	Chris Walker; 4,629; 8.55%	Ernest Oliver Rathwell (Mar.); 347; 0.64%	Scott Reid
Leeds—Grenville	Gord Brown; 27,473; 58.44%	Marjory Loveys; 8,075; 17.18%	Steve Armstrong; 6,511; 13.85%	Jeanie Warnock; 4,522; 9.62%	John McCrea (PC); 426; 0.91%	Gord Brown
Prince Edward—Hastings	Daryl Kramp; 26,061; 50.19%	Ken Cole; 14,048; 27.06%	Michael McMahon; 7,156; 13.78%	Alan Coxwell; 4,379; 8.43%	Paul Barnes (Ind.); 276; 0.53%	Daryl Kramp
Renfrew— Nipissing— Pembroke	Cheryl Gallant; 28,908; 61.10%	Carole Devine; 9,737; 20.58%	Sue McSheffrey; 5,175; 10.94%	Ben Hoffman; 3,201; 6.77%	Denis Gagné (Ind.); 293; 0.62%	Cheryl Gallant
Stormont— Dundas— South Glengarry	Guy Lauzon; 25,846; 57.34%	Denis Sabourin; 8,554; 18.98%	Darlene Jalbert; 6,107; 13.55%	David Rawnsley; 1,880; 4.17%	DWight Dugas (CAP); 105 0.23%	Guy Lauzon
Stormont— Dundas— South Glengarry	Guy Lauzon; 25,846; 57.34%	Denis Sabourin; 8,554; 18.98%	Darlene Jalbert; 6,107; 13.55%	David Rawnsley; 1,880; 4.17%	Howard Galganov (Ind.); 2,581 5.73%	Guy Lauzon

=== Central Ontario ===
Electoral district	Candidates						Incumbent
Electoral district	Conservative	Liberal	NDP	Green	Christian Heritage	Other	Incumbent
Barrie	Patrick Brown; 27,927; 52.37%	Rick Jones; 12,732; 23.88%	Myrna Clark; 6,403; 12.01%	Erich Jacoby-Hawkins; 5,921; 11.10%		Paolo Fabrizio (Libert.); 260 0.49%	Patrick Brown
Barrie	Patrick Brown; 27,927; 52.37%	Rick Jones; 12,732; 23.88%	Myrna Clark; 6,403; 12.01%	Erich Jacoby-Hawkins; 5,921; 11.10%		Christine Anne Nugent (M-L); 84 0.16%	Patrick Brown
Bruce— Grey— Owen Sound	Larry Miller; 22,975; 47.66%	Thom Noble; 6,892; 14.30%	Jill McIllwraith; 4,640; 9.63%	Dick Hibma; 13,095; 27.17%	Joel Kidd; 599; 1.24%		Larry Miller
Dufferin—Caledon	David Tilson; 23,363; 53.21%	Rebecca Finch; 8,495; 19.35%	Jason Bissett; 4,385; 9.99%	Ard Van Leeuwen; 7,377; 16.80%		Dean Woods (CAP); 284; 0.65%	David Tilson
Durham	**Bev Oda**; 28,551; 54.05%	Bryan Ransom; 12,167; 23.03%	Andrew McKeever; 5,485; 10.38%	Stephen Leahy; 6,041; 11.44%	Henry Zekveld; 577; 1.09%		**Bev Oda**
Haliburton— Kawartha Lakes— Brock	Barry Devolin; 30,391; 55.95%	Marlene White; 11,093; 20.42%	Stephen Yardy; 7,952; 14.64%	Michael Bell; 4,505; 8.29%	Dave Switzer; 374; 0.69%		Barry Devolin
Newmarket—Aurora	Lois Brown; 24,873; 46.70%	Tim Jones; 18,250; 34.27%	Mike Seaward; 4,548; 8.54%	Glenn Hubbers; 4,381; 8.23%	Ray Luff; 205; 0.38%	Dorian Baxter (PC); 1,004; 1.89%	Belinda Stronach†
Northumberland— Quinte West	Rick Norlock; 27,615; 48.71%	Paul Macklin; 16,209; 28.59%	Russ Christianson; 8,230; 14.52%	Ralph Torrie; 4,633; 8.17%			Rick Norlock
Peterborough	Dean Del Mastro; 27,630; 47.40%	Betsy McGregor; 18,417; 31.60%	Steve Sharpe; 8,115; 13.92%	Emily Berrigan; 4,029; 6.91%		Elaine Couto (M-L); 98; 0.17%	Dean Del Mastro
Simcoe—Grey	**Helena Guergis**; 30,897; 55.05%	Andrea Matrosovs; 12,099; 21.56%	Katy Austin; 6,288; 11.20%	Peter Ellis; 5,685; 10.13%	Peter Vander Zaag; 1,018; 1.81%	Caley McKibbin (Libert.); 143; 0.25%	**Helena Guergis**
Simcoe North	Bruce Stanton; 26,328; 49.66%	Steve Clarke; 14,670; 27.67%	Richard Banigan; 6,202; 11.70%	Valerie Powell; 5,821; 10.98%			Bruce Stanton
York—Simcoe	**Peter Van Loan**; 27,412; 56.70%	Judith Moses; 9,044; 18.71%	Sylvia Gerl; 5,882; 12.17%	John Dewar; 4,887; 10.11%	Vicki Gunn; 444; 0.92%	Paul Pisani (PC); 676; 1.40%	**Peter Van Loan**

=== Southern Durham and York ===
Electoral district	Candidates					Incumbent
Electoral district	Conservative	Liberal	NDP	Green	Other	Incumbent
Ajax—Pickering	Rick Johnson; 18,471; 37.95%	Mark Holland; 21,675; 44.53%	Bala Thavarajasoorier; 4,422; 9.08%	Mike Harilaid; 3,543; 7.28%	Kevin Norng (CHP); 398 0.82%	Mark Holland
Ajax—Pickering	Rick Johnson; 18,471; 37.95%	Mark Holland; 21,675; 44.53%	Bala Thavarajasoorier; 4,422; 9.08%	Mike Harilaid; 3,543; 7.28%	Stephanie Wilson (Libert.); 167 0.34%	Mark Holland
Markham—Unionville	Duncan Fletcher; 13,855; 30.13%	John McCallum; 25,296; 55.02%	Nadine Hawkins; 4,682; 10.18%	Leonard Aitken; 1,921; 4.18%	Allen Small (Libert.); 225; 0.49%	John McCallum
Oak Ridges—Markham	Paul Calandra; 32,028; 42.24%	Lui Temelkovski; 31,483; 41.52%	Andy Arifin; 7,126; 9.40%	Richard Taylor; 5,184; 6.84%		Lui Temelkovski
Oshawa	Colin Carrie; 19,951; 41.37%	Sean Godfrey; 7,741; 16.05%	Mike Shields; 16,750; 34.73%	Pat Gostlin; 3,374; 7.00%	David Gershuny (M-L); 117 0.24%	Colin Carrie
Oshawa	Colin Carrie; 19,951; 41.37%	Sean Godfrey; 7,741; 16.05%	Mike Shields; 16,750; 34.73%	Pat Gostlin; 3,374; 7.00%	Alex Kreider (CAP); 52 0.11%	Colin Carrie
Oshawa	Colin Carrie; 19,951; 41.37%	Sean Godfrey; 7,741; 16.05%	Mike Shields; 16,750; 34.73%	Pat Gostlin; 3,374; 7.00%	Peter Vogel (CHP); 246 0.51%	Colin Carrie
Pickering— Scarborough East	George Khouri; 14,940; 32.45%	Dan McTeague; 22,874; 49.69%	Andrea Moffat; 4,875; 10.59%	Jason Becevello; 3,023; 6.57%	Rick Chue (CHP); 191 0.41%	Dan McTeague
Pickering— Scarborough East	George Khouri; 14,940; 32.45%	Dan McTeague; 22,874; 49.69%	Andrea Moffat; 4,875; 10.59%	Jason Becevello; 3,023; 6.57%	Chai Kalevar (CAP); 130 0.28%	Dan McTeague
Richmond Hill	Chungsen Leung; 16,318; 35.69%	Bryon Wilfert; 21,488; 47.00%	Wess Dowsett; 4,526; 9.90%	Dylan Marando; 3,388; 7.41%		Bryon Wilfert
Thornhill	Peter Kent; 26,660; 49.01%	Susan Kadis; 21,448; 39.43%	Simon Strelchik; 3,601; 6.62%	Norbert Koehl; 2,686; 4.94%		Susan Kadis
Vaughan	Richard Lorello; 19,390; 34.33%	Maurizio Bevilacqua; 27,773; 49.18%	Vicky Wilkin; 5,442; 9.64%	Adrian Visentin; 3,870; 6.85%		Maurizio Bevilacqua
Whitby—Oshawa	**Jim Flaherty**; 30,704; 50.99%	Brent Fullard; 15,460; 25.68%	David Purdy; 8,584; 14.26%	Doug Anderson; 5,067; 8.42%	Yvonne Forbes (CHP); 395; 0.66%	**Jim Flaherty**

=== Suburban Toronto ===
Electoral district	Candidates					Incumbent
Electoral district	Conservative	Liberal	NDP	Green	Other	Incumbent
Don Valley East	Eugene McDermott; 11,777; 31.00%	Yasmin Ratansi; 18,264; 48.08%	Mary Trapani Hynes; 5,062; 13.33%	Wayne Clements; 2,618; 6.89%	Alex Kovalenko (CHP); 266; 0.70%	Yasmin Ratansi
Etobicoke Centre	Axel Kuhn; 18,839; 37.51%	Borys Wrzesnewskyj; 24,537; 48.85%	Joseph Schwartz; 4,164; 8.29%	Marion Schaffer; 2,688; 5.35%		Borys Wrzesnewskyj
Etobicoke—Lakeshore	Patrick Boyer; 17,793; 34.87%	Michael Ignatieff; 23,536; 46.13%	Liam McHugh-Russell; 5,950; 11.66%	Dave Corail; 3,562; 6.98%	Janice Murray (M-L); 181; 0.35%	Michael Ignatieff
Etobicoke North	Bob Saroya; 9,436; 30.07%	Kirsty Duncan; 15,244; 48.58%	Ali Naqvi; 4,940; 15.74%	Nigel Barriffe; 1,460; 4.65%	Anna Di Carlo (M-L); 300; 0.96%	Roy Cullen†
Scarborough—Agincourt	Benson Lau; 11,836; 29.41%	Jim Karygiannis; 22,795; 56.63%	Simon Dougherty; 3,738; 9.31%	Adrian Molder; 1,870; 4.65%		Jim Karygiannis
Scarborough Centre	Roxanne James; 11,088; 30.11%	John Cannis; 17,927; 48.68%	Natalie Hundt; 5,801; 15.75%	Ella Ng; 2,011; 5.46%		John Cannis
Scarborough—Guildwood	Chuck Konkel; 10,881; 30.16%	John McKay; 18,098; 50.17%	Sania Khan; 5,183; 14.37%	Alonzo Bartley; 1,913; 5.30%		John McKay
Scarborough—Rouge River	Jerry Bance; 9,160; 22.70%	Derek Lee; 23,718; 58.78%	Ryan Sloan; 5,936; 14.71%	Attila Nagy; 1,207; 2.99%	Alan Mercer (Libert.); 331; 0.82%	Derek Lee
Scarborough Southwest	Greg Crompton; 10,928; 29.52%	Michelle Simson; 15,486; 41.83%	Alamgir Hussain; 6,943; 18.75%	Stefan Dixon; 3,514; 9.49%	M. H. Fatique Chowdhury Kabir (Ind.); 151; 0.41%	Tom Wappel†
Willowdale	Jake Karns; 15,931; 32.46%	Martha Hall Findlay; 23,889; 48.67%	Susan Wallace; 5,011; 10.21%	Lou Carcasole; 3,130; 6.38%	Bernadette Michael (Ind.); 260 0.53%	Martha Hall Findlay
Willowdale	Jake Karns; 15,931; 32.46%	Martha Hall Findlay; 23,889; 48.67%	Susan Wallace; 5,011; 10.21%	Lou Carcasole; 3,130; 6.38%	Bahman Roudgarnia (PC); 864 1.76%	Martha Hall Findlay
York Centre	Rochelle Wilner; 14,132; 38.00%	Ken Dryden; 16,164; 43.46%	Kurtis Baily; 4,503; 12.11%	Rosemary Frei; 2,390; 6.43%		Ken Dryden
York West	Kevin Nguyen; 4,773; 16.68%	Judy Sgro; 16,997; 59.39%	Giulio Manfrini; 5,363; 18.74%	Nick Capra; 1,488; 5.20%		Judy Sgro

=== Central Toronto ===
Electoral district	Candidates						Incumbent
Electoral district	Conservative	Liberal	NDP	Green	Marxist-Leninist	Other	Incumbent
Beaches— East York	Caroline Alleslev; 7,907; 17.08%	Maria Minna; 18,967; 40.97%	Marilyn Churley; 14,875; 32.13%	Zoran Markovski; 4,389; 9.48%	Roger Carter; 155; 0.33%		Maria Minna
Davenport	Theresa Rodrigues; 3,838; 11.01%	Mario Silva; 15,953; 45.77%	Peter Ferreira; 10,896; 31.26%	Wayne Scott; 3,655; 10.49%	Sarah Thompson; 87; 0.25%	Miguel Figueroa (Comm.); 160 0.46%	Mario Silva
Davenport	Theresa Rodrigues; 3,838; 11.01%	Mario Silva; 15,953; 45.77%	Peter Ferreira; 10,896; 31.26%	Wayne Scott; 3,655; 10.49%	Sarah Thompson; 87; 0.25%	Wendy Forrest (Ind.); 172 0.49%	Mario Silva
Davenport	Theresa Rodrigues; 3,838; 11.01%	Mario Silva; 15,953; 45.77%	Peter Ferreira; 10,896; 31.26%	Wayne Scott; 3,655; 10.49%	Sarah Thompson; 87; 0.25%	Simon Luisi (AAEVP); 92 0.26%	Mario Silva
Don Valley West	John Carmichael; 19,441; 38.83%	Rob Oliphant; 22,112; 44.36%	David Sparrow; 5,102; 10.19%	Georgina Wilcock; 3,155; 6.30%		Catherine Holiday (Comm.); 162 0.32%	Vacant
Eglinton—Lawrence	Joe Oliver; 17,073; 39.25%	Joe Volpe; 19,113; 43.99%	Justin Chatwin; 3,663; 8.42%	Andrew James; 3,629; 8.34%			Joe Volpe
Parkdale— High Park	Jilian Saweczko; 5,992; 12.44%	Gerard Kennedy; 20,705; 42.98%	Peggy Nash; 17,332; 35.97%	Rob Rishchynski; 3,601; 7.47%	Lorne Gershuny; 110; 0.23%	Andrew Borkowski (CHP); 230 0.48%	Peggy Nash
Parkdale— High Park	Jilian Saweczko; 5,992; 12.44%	Gerard Kennedy; 20,705; 42.98%	Peggy Nash; 17,332; 35.97%	Rob Rishchynski; 3,601; 7.47%	Lorne Gershuny; 110; 0.23%	Terry Parker (Mar.); 209 0.43%	Peggy Nash
St. Paul's	Heather Jewell; 13,948; 26.86%	Carolyn Bennett; 26,286; 50.61%	Anita Agrawal; 6,666; 12.83%	Justin Erdman; 4,726; 9.10%		John Kittredge (Libert.); 312; 0.60%	Carolyn Bennett
Toronto Centre	David Peter Gentili; 9,402; 18.33%	Bob Rae; 27,462; 53.53%	El-Farouk Khaki; 7,741; 15.09%	Ellen Michelson; 6,081; 11.85%	Philip Fernandez; 92; 0.18%	Johan Boyden (Comm.); 193 0.38%	Bob Rae
Toronto Centre	David Peter Gentili; 9,402; 18.33%	Bob Rae; 27,462; 53.53%	El-Farouk Khaki; 7,741; 15.09%	Ellen Michelson; 6,081; 11.85%	Philip Fernandez; 92; 0.18%	Gerald Derome (Ind.); 146 0.28%	Bob Rae
Toronto Centre	David Peter Gentili; 9,402; 18.33%	Bob Rae; 27,462; 53.53%	El-Farouk Khaki; 7,741; 15.09%	Ellen Michelson; 6,081; 11.85%	Philip Fernandez; 92; 0.18%	Liz White (AAEVP); 187 0.36%	Bob Rae
Toronto—Danforth	Christina Perreault; 5,287; 11.65%	Andrew Lang; 13,336; 29.38%	**Jack Layton**; 20,323; 44.78%	Sharon Howarth; 5,955; 13.21%	Marcell Rodden; 87; 0.19%	Marie Crawford (AAEVP); 175 0.39%	**Jack Layton**
Toronto—Danforth	Christina Perreault; 5,287; 11.65%	Andrew Lang; 13,336; 29.38%	**Jack Layton**; 20,323; 44.78%	Sharon Howarth; 5,955; 13.21%	Marcell Rodden; 87; 0.19%	John Richardson (Ind.); 130 0.29%	**Jack Layton**
Toronto—Danforth	Christina Perreault; 5,287; 11.65%	Andrew Lang; 13,336; 29.38%	**Jack Layton**; 20,323; 44.78%	Sharon Howarth; 5,955; 13.21%	Marcell Rodden; 87; 0.19%	Bahman Yazdanfar (CAP); 54 0.12%	**Jack Layton**
Trinity—Spadina	Christine McGirr; 8,249; 13.78%	Christine Innes; 20,970; 35.02%	Olivia Chow; 24,454; 40.84%	Stephen La Frenie; 5,418; 9.05%		Carlos Santos Almeida (Ind.); 164 0.27%	Olivia Chow
Trinity—Spadina	Christine McGirr; 8,249; 13.78%	Christine Innes; 20,970; 35.02%	Olivia Chow; 24,454; 40.84%	Stephen La Frenie; 5,418; 9.05%		Chester Brown (Libert.); 491 0.82%	Olivia Chow
Trinity—Spadina	Christine McGirr; 8,249; 13.78%	Christine Innes; 20,970; 35.02%	Olivia Chow; 24,454; 40.84%	Stephen La Frenie; 5,418; 9.05%		Val Illie (Ind.); 132 0.22%	Olivia Chow
York South—Weston	Aydin Cocelli; 7,021; 20.36%	Alan Tonks; 16,071; 46.60%	Mike Sullivan; 9,641; 27.95%	Andre Papadimitriou; 1,757; 5.09%			Alan Tonks

=== Brampton, Mississauga and Oakville ===
Electoral district	Candidates					Incumbent
Electoral district	Conservative	Liberal	NDP	Green	Other	Incumbent
Bramalea—Gore—Malton	Stella Ambler; 18,353; 37.13%	Gurbax S. Malhi; 22,272; 45.06%	Jash Puniya; 5,945; 12.03%	Mark Pajot; 2,551; 5.16%	Frank Chilelli (M-L); 309; 0.63%	Gurbax Malhi
Brampton—Springdale	Parm Gill; 17,804; 39.33%	Ruby Dhalla; 18,577; 41.04%	Mani Singh; 5,238; 11.57%	Dave Finlay; 3,516; 7.77%	Dimitrios Kabitsis (Comm.); 135; 0.30%	Ruby Dhalla
Brampton West	Kyle Seeback; 21,515; 39.90%	Andrew Kania; 21,746; 40.33%	Jagtar Shergill; 7,334; 13.60%	Patti Chmelyk; 3,329; 6.17%		Colleen Beaumier†
Mississauga— Brampton South	Salma Ataullahjan; 14,664; 32.96%	Navdeep Bains; 21,220; 47.69%	Karan Pandher; 5,268; 11.84%	Grace Yogaretnam; 2,947; 6.62%	Tim Sullivan (M-L); 395; 0.89%	Navdeep Bains
Mississauga East—Cooksville	Melissa Bhagat; 13,277; 32.56%	Albina Guarnieri; 20,457; 50.16%	Satish Balasunderam; 4,632; 11.36%	Jaymini Bhikha; 2,138; 5.24%	Pierre Chénier (M-L); 277; 0.68%	Albina Guarnieri
Mississauga—Erindale	Bob Dechert; 23,863; 42.71%	Omar Alghabra; 23,466; 42.00%	Mustafa Rizvi; 4,774; 8.55%	Richard Pietro; 3,636; 6.51%	Dagmar Sullivan (M-L); 129; 0.23%	Omar Alghabra
Mississauga South	Hugh Arrison; 18,366; 39.59%	Paul Szabo; 20,518; 44.22%	Matt Turner; 4,104; 8.85%	Richard Laushway; 3,407; 7.34%		Paul Szabo
Mississauga—Streetsville	Wajid Khan; 16,985; 35.80%	Bonnie Crombie; 21,710; 45.76%	Keith Pinto; 4,710; 9.93%	Otto Casanova; 3,179; 6.70%	Ralph Bunag (Ind.); 426 0.90%	Wajid Khan
Mississauga—Streetsville	Wajid Khan; 16,985; 35.80%	Bonnie Crombie; 21,710; 45.76%	Keith Pinto; 4,710; 9.93%	Otto Casanova; 3,179; 6.70%	Viktor Spanovic (Ind.); 431 0.91%	Wajid Khan
Oakville	Terence Young; 26,011; 46.98%	M.A. Bonnie Brown; 20,528; 37.08%	Michelle Bilek; 4,143; 7.48%	Blake Poland; 4,681; 8.46%		Bonnie Brown

=== Hamilton, Burlington and Niagara ===
Electoral district	Candidates					Incumbent
Electoral district	Conservative	Liberal	NDP	Green	Other	Incumbent
Ancaster—Dundas—Flamborough—Westdale	David Sweet; 26,297; 46.50%	Arlene MacFarlane-VanderBeek; 15,322; 27.10%	Gordon Guyatt; 9,632; 17.03%	Peter Ormond; 5,149; 9.11%	Jamie Ghaddar (M-L); 148; 0.26%	David Sweet
Burlington	Mike Wallace; 28,614; 48.60%	Paddy Torsney; 19,577; 33.25%	David Laird; 6,597; 11.21%	Marnie Mellish; 4,083; 6.94%		Mike Wallace
Halton	Lisa Raitt; 32,986; 47.50%	Garth Turner; 25,136; 36.19%	Robert Wagner; 6,118; 8.81%	Amy Collard; 4,872; 7.02%	Tony Rodrigues (CHP); 337; 0.49%	Garth Turner
Hamilton Centre	Leon O'Connor; 9,051; 22.28%	Helen M. Wilson; 7,164; 17.63%	David Christopherson; 20,010; 49.25%	John Livingstone; 3,625; 8.92%	Anthony Giles (Libert.); 528 1.30%	David Christopherson
Hamilton Centre	Leon O'Connor; 9,051; 22.28%	Helen M. Wilson; 7,164; 17.63%	David Christopherson; 20,010; 49.25%	John Livingstone; 3,625; 8.92%	Lisa Nussey (M-L); 126 0.31%	David Christopherson
Hamilton Centre	Leon O'Connor; 9,051; 22.28%	Helen M. Wilson; 7,164; 17.63%	David Christopherson; 20,010; 49.25%	John Livingstone; 3,625; 8.92%	Ryan Sparrow (Comm.); 125 0.31%	David Christopherson
Hamilton East—Stoney Creek	Frank Rukavina; 11,556; 23.95%	Larry Di Ianni; 13,445; 27.89%	Wayne Marston; 19,919; 41.28%	Dave William Hart Dyke; 2,142; 4.44%	Sam Cino (Ind.); 323 0.67%	Wayne Marston
Hamilton East—Stoney Creek	Frank Rukavina; 11,556; 23.95%	Larry Di Ianni; 13,445; 27.89%	Wayne Marston; 19,919; 41.28%	Dave William Hart Dyke; 2,142; 4.44%	Gord Hill (PC); 853 1.77%	Wayne Marston
Hamilton Mountain	Terry Anderson; 16,010; 30.66%	Tyler Banham; 10,531; 20.17%	Chris Charlton; 22,796; 43.65%	Stephen Brotherston; 2,884; 5.52%		Chris Charlton
Niagara Falls	**Rob Nicholson**; 24,016; 46.70%	Joyce Morocco; 13,867; 26.97%	Eric Gillespie; 9,186; 17.86%	Shawn Willick; 4,356; 8.47%		**Rob Nicholson**
Niagara West—Glanbrook	Dean Allison; 28,089; 51.98%	Heather Carter; 12,955; 23.97%	Dave Heatley; 7,980; 14.77%	Sid Frere; 3,897; 7.21%	Dave Bylsma (CHP); 1,118; 2.07%	Dean Allison
St. Catharines	Rick Dykstra; 23,474; 45.90%	Walt Lastewka; 14,652; 28.65%	George N. Addison; 9,428; 18.43%	Jim Fannon; 3,477; 6.80%	Sam Hammond (Comm.); 113; 0.22%	Rick Dykstra
Welland	Alf Kiers; 16,542; 32.32%	John Maloney; 14,295; 27.93%	Malcolm Allen; 16,842; 32.91%	Jennifer Mooradian; 2,816; 5.50%	Jody Di Bartolomeo (Ind.); 569 1.11%	John Maloney
Welland	Alf Kiers; 16,542; 32.32%	John Maloney; 14,295; 27.93%	Malcolm Allen; 16,842; 32.91%	Jennifer Mooradian; 2,816; 5.50%	Ron Walker (M-L); 114 0.22%	John Maloney

=== Midwestern Ontario ===
Electoral district	Candidates					Incumbent
Electoral district	Conservative	Liberal	NDP	Green	Other	Incumbent
Brant	Phil McColeman; 22,736; 41.95%	Lloyd St. Amand; 17,943; 33.11%	Brian Van Tilborg; 9,331; 17.22%	Nora Fueten; 3,814; 7.04%	John G. Gots (CHP); 371; 0.68%	Lloyd St. Amand
Cambridge	Gary Goodyear; 24,895; 48.63%	Gord Zeilstra; 11,977; 23.39%	Max Lombardi; 10,044; 19.62%	Scott Cosman; 4,279; 8.36%		Gary Goodyear
Guelph	Gloria Kovach; 17,186; 29.18%	Frank Valeriote; 18,974; 32.22%	Tom King; 9,713; 16.49%	Mike Nagy; 12,454; 21.15%	Philip Bender (Libert.); 159 0.27%	Vacant
Guelph	Gloria Kovach; 17,186; 29.18%	Frank Valeriote; 18,974; 32.22%	Tom King; 9,713; 16.49%	Mike Nagy; 12,454; 21.15%	Manuel Couto (M-L); 29 0.05%	Vacant
Guelph	Gloria Kovach; 17,186; 29.18%	Frank Valeriote; 18,974; 32.22%	Tom King; 9,713; 16.49%	Mike Nagy; 12,454; 21.15%	Drew Garvie (Comm.); 77 0.13%	Vacant
Guelph	Gloria Kovach; 17,186; 29.18%	Frank Valeriote; 18,974; 32.22%	Tom King; 9,713; 16.49%	Mike Nagy; 12,454; 21.15%	Kornelis Klevering (Mar.); 166 0.28%	Vacant
Guelph	Gloria Kovach; 17,186; 29.18%	Frank Valeriote; 18,974; 32.22%	Tom King; 9,713; 16.49%	Mike Nagy; 12,454; 21.15%	Karen Levenson (AAEVP); 73 0.12%	Vacant
Guelph	Gloria Kovach; 17,186; 29.18%	Frank Valeriote; 18,974; 32.22%	Tom King; 9,713; 16.49%	Mike Nagy; 12,454; 21.15%	John Turmel (Ind.); 58 0.10%	Vacant
Haldimand—Norfolk	Diane Finley; 19,657; 40.83%	Eric Hoskins; 15,577; 32.35%	Ian Nichols; 5,549; 11.53%	Stephana Johnston; 2,041; 4.24%	Steven Elgersma (CHP); 501 1.04%	Diane Finley
Haldimand—Norfolk	Diane Finley; 19,657; 40.83%	Eric Hoskins; 15,577; 32.35%	Ian Nichols; 5,549; 11.53%	Stephana Johnston; 2,041; 4.24%	Gary McHale (Ind.); 4,821 10.01%	Diane Finley
Huron—Bruce	Ben Lobb; 22,182; 44.77%	Greg McClinchey; 16,336; 32.97%	Tony McQuail; 7,426; 14.99%	Glen Smith; 2,617; 5.28%	Dave Joslin (CHP); 747 1.51%	Paul Steckle†
Huron—Bruce	Ben Lobb; 22,182; 44.77%	Greg McClinchey; 16,336; 32.97%	Tony McQuail; 7,426; 14.99%	Glen Smith; 2,617; 5.28%	Dennis Valenta (Ind.); 242 0.49%	Paul Steckle†
Kitchener Centre	Stephen Woodworth; 16,480; 36.70%	Karen Redman; 16,141; 35.94%	Oz Cole-Arnal; 8,122; 18.09%	John Bithell; 3,823; 8.51%	Amanda Lamka (Ind.); 215 0.48%	Karen Redman
Kitchener Centre	Stephen Woodworth; 16,480; 36.70%	Karen Redman; 16,141; 35.94%	Oz Cole-Arnal; 8,122; 18.09%	John Bithell; 3,823; 8.51%	Martin Suter (Comm.); 127 0.28%	Karen Redman
Kitchener—Conestoga	Harold Albrecht; 23,525; 49.32%	Orlando Da Silva; 11,876; 24.90%	Rod McNeil; 7,173; 15.04%	Jamie Kropf; 5,124; 10.74%		Harold Albrecht
Kitchener—Waterloo	Peter Braid; 21,830; 36.06%	Andrew Telegdi; 21,813; 36.03%	Cindy Jacobsen; 8,915; 14.73%	Cathy MacLellan; 7,326; 12.10%	Mark Corbiere (Ind.); 107 0.18%	Andrew Telegdi
Kitchener—Waterloo	Peter Braid; 21,830; 36.06%	Andrew Telegdi; 21,813; 36.03%	Cindy Jacobsen; 8,915; 14.73%	Cathy MacLellan; 7,326; 12.10%	Jason Cousineau (Libert.); 333 0.55%	Andrew Telegdi
Kitchener—Waterloo	Peter Braid; 21,830; 36.06%	Andrew Telegdi; 21,813; 36.03%	Cindy Jacobsen; 8,915; 14.73%	Cathy MacLellan; 7,326; 12.10%	Kyle James Huntingdon (CAP); 105 0.17%	Andrew Telegdi
Kitchener—Waterloo	Peter Braid; 21,830; 36.06%	Andrew Telegdi; 21,813; 36.03%	Cindy Jacobsen; 8,915; 14.73%	Cathy MacLellan; 7,326; 12.10%	Ramon Portillo (Comm.); 105 0.17%	Andrew Telegdi
Oxford	Dave MacKenzie; 23,330; 52.68%	Martha Dennis; 8,586; 19.39%	Diane Abbott; 7,982; 18.02%	Cathy Mott; 3,355; 7.58%	Shaun MacDonald (CHP); 1,036; 2.34%	Dave MacKenzie
Perth Wellington	Gary Ralph Schellenberger; 20,765; 48.09%	Sandra Gardiner; 10,225; 23.68%	Kerry McManus; 7,334; 16.98%	John Cowling; 3,874; 8.97%	Irma DeVries (CHP); 898 2.08%	Gary Schellenberger
Perth Wellington	Gary Ralph Schellenberger; 20,765; 48.09%	Sandra Gardiner; 10,225; 23.68%	Kerry McManus; 7,334; 16.98%	John Cowling; 3,874; 8.97%	Julian Ichim (M-L); 84 0.19%	Gary Schellenberger
Wellington— Halton Hills	Michael Chong; 29,191; 57.63%	Bruce Bowser; 11,312; 22.33%	Noel Duignan; 4,747; 9.37%	Brent Bouteiller; 4,987; 9.85%	Jeffrey Streutker (CHP); 414; 0.82%	Michael Chong

=== Southwestern Ontario ===
Electoral district	Candidates					Incumbent
Electoral district	Conservative	Liberal	NDP	Green	Other	Incumbent
Chatham-Kent— Essex	Dave Van Kesteren; 19,960; 47.92%	Matt Daudlin; 12,127; 29.12%	Ron Cadotte; 6,850; 16.45%	Alina Abbott; 2,712; 6.51%		Dave Van Kesteren
Elgin— Middlesex— London	Joe Preston; 22,970; 48.39%	Suzanne van Bommel; 11,169; 23.53%	Ryan Dolby; 9,135; 19.24%	Noel Burgon; 3,241; 6.83%	Will Arlow (CAP); 96 0.20%	Joe Preston
Elgin— Middlesex— London	Joe Preston; 22,970; 48.39%	Suzanne van Bommel; 11,169; 23.53%	Ryan Dolby; 9,135; 19.24%	Noel Burgon; 3,241; 6.83%	Carl Hiemstra (CHP); 619 1.30%	Joe Preston
Elgin— Middlesex— London	Joe Preston; 22,970; 48.39%	Suzanne van Bommel; 11,169; 23.53%	Ryan Dolby; 9,135; 19.24%	Noel Burgon; 3,241; 6.83%	Michael van Holst (Ind.); 243 0.51%	Joe Preston
Essex	Jeff Watson; 20,608; 40.00%	Susan Whelan; 14,973; 29.06%	Taras Natyshak; 13,703; 26.60%	Richard Bachynsky; 2,234; 4.34%		Jeff Watson
Lambton— Kent— Middlesex	Bev Shipley; 24,516; 51.28%	Jeff Wesley; 11,812; 24.71%	Joe Hill; 7,427; 15.54%	Jim Johnston; 3,386; 7.08%	Micheal Janssens (CHP); 663; 1.39%	Bev Shipley
London—Fanshawe	Mary Lou Ambrogio; 12,659; 30.85%	Jacquie Gauthier; 7,774; 18.94%	Irene Mathyssen; 17,672; 43.06%	Daniel O'Neail; 2,656; 6.47%	Leonard Vanderhoeven (CHP); 276; 0.67%	Irene Mathyssen
London North Centre	Paul Van Meerbergen; 17,712; 32.97%	Glen Pearson; 21,018; 39.13%	Steve Holmes; 9,387; 17.47%	Mary Ann Hodge; 5,603; 10.43%		Glen Pearson
London West	Ed Holder; 22,556; 39.09%	Sue Barnes; 20,435; 35.42%	Peter Ferguson; 8,409; 14.57%	Monica Jarabek; 5,630; 9.76%	Leslie Bartley (CHP); 253 0.44%	Sue Barnes
London West	Ed Holder; 22,556; 39.09%	Sue Barnes; 20,435; 35.42%	Peter Ferguson; 8,409; 14.57%	Monica Jarabek; 5,630; 9.76%	Steve Hunter (PC); 414 0.72%	Sue Barnes
Sarnia—Lambton	Pat Davidson; 23,195; 50.01%	Tim Fugard; 9,404; 20.28%	Andy Bruziewicz; 10,037; 21.64%	Alan McKeown; 3,201; 6.90%	Christopher Desormeaux-Malm (CHP); 545; 1.18%	Patricia Davidson
Windsor—Tecumseh	Denise Ghanam; 10,276; 23.93%	Steve Mastroianni; 9,005; 20.97%	Joe Comartin; 20,914; 48.70%	Kyle Prestanski; 2,749; 6.40%		Joe Comartin
Windsor West	Lisa Lumley; 8,954; 22.61%	Larry Horwitz; 7,357; 18.58%	Brian Masse; 20,791; 52.51%	John Esposito; 2,253; 5.69%	Elizabeth Rowley (Comm.); 125 0.32%	Brian Masse
Windsor West	Lisa Lumley; 8,954; 22.61%	Larry Horwitz; 7,357; 18.58%	Brian Masse; 20,791; 52.51%	John Esposito; 2,253; 5.69%	Margaret Villamizar (M-L); 116 0.29%	Brian Masse

=== Northern Ontario ===
Electoral district	Candidates					Incumbent
Electoral district	Conservative	Liberal	NDP	Green	Other	Incumbent
Algoma— Manitoulin— Kapuskasing	Dianne Musgrove; 5,914; 17.65%	Brent St. Denis; 10,902; 32.53%	Carol Hughes; 15,249; 45.50%	Lorraine Rekmans; 1,451; 4.33%		Brent St. Denis
Kenora	Greg Rickford; 9,395; 40.46%	Roger Valley; 7,344; 31.63%	Tania Cameron; 5,394; 23.23%	JoJo Holiday; 1,087; 4.68%		Roger Valley
Nickel Belt	Ian McCracken; 8,869; 21.70%	Louise Portelance; 10,748; 26.30%	Claude Gravelle; 19,021; 46.54%	Fred Twilley; 2,056; 5.03%	Steve Rutchinski (M-L); 66 0.16%	Raymond Bonin†
Nickel Belt	Ian McCracken; 8,869; 21.70%	Louise Portelance; 10,748; 26.30%	Claude Gravelle; 19,021; 46.54%	Fred Twilley; 2,056; 5.03%	Yves Villeneuve (Ind.); 112 0.27%	Raymond Bonin†
Nipissing—Timiskaming	Joe Sinicrope; 13,432; 32.34%	Anthony Rota; 18,510; 44.56%	Dianna Allen; 6,582; 15.85%	Craig Bridges; 2,808; 6.76%	Andrew Moulden (CAP); 204; 0.49%	Anthony Rota
Parry Sound-Muskoka	**Tony Clement**; 21,831; 50.19%	Jamie McGarvey; 10,871; 24.99%	Jo-Anne Boulding; 5,355; 12.31%	Glen Hodgson; 5,119; 11.77%	David Rowland (Ind.); 325; 0.75%	**Tony Clement**
Sault Ste. Marie	Cameron Ross; 15,461; 37.72%	Paul Bichler; 6,870; 16.76%	Tony Martin; 16,572; 40.43%	Luke Macmichael; 1,774; 4.33%	Cory McLeod (FPNP); 235 0.57%	Tony Martin
Sault Ste. Marie	Cameron Ross; 15,461; 37.72%	Paul Bichler; 6,870; 16.76%	Tony Martin; 16,572; 40.43%	Luke Macmichael; 1,774; 4.33%	Mike Taffarel (M-L); 81 0.20%	Tony Martin
Sudbury	Gerry Labelle; 11,073; 25.79%	Diane Marleau; 12,969; 30.20%	Glenn Thibeault; 15,094; 35.15%	Gordon Harris; 3,330; 7.75%	Will Morin (FPNP); 397 0.92%	Diane Marleau
Sudbury	Gerry Labelle; 11,073; 25.79%	Diane Marleau; 12,969; 30.20%	Glenn Thibeault; 15,094; 35.15%	Gordon Harris; 3,330; 7.75%	J. David Popescu (Ind.); 80 0.19%	Diane Marleau
Thunder Bay— Rainy River	Richard Neumann; 8,466; 23.58%	Ken Boshcoff; 11,589; 32.27%	John Rafferty; 14,478; 40.32%	Russ Aegard; 1,377; 3.83%		Ken Boshcoff
Thunder Bay— Superior North	Bev Sarafin; 9,556; 26.83%	Don McArthur; 10,083; 28.31%	Bruce Hyer; 13,187; 37.03%	Brendan Daniel Hughes; 2,463; 6.92%	Dennis Andrew Carrière (Mar.); 327; 0.92%	Joe Comuzzi†
Timmins— James Bay	Bill Greenberg; 5,536; 18.21%	Paul Taillefer; 6,740; 22.17%	Charlie Angus; 17,188; 56.54%	Larry Verner; 938; 3.09%		Charlie Angus

== Manitoba ==
=== Rural Manitoba ===
Electoral district	Candidates						Incumbent
Electoral district	Conservative	Liberal	NDP	Green	Christian Heritage	Other	Incumbent
Brandon—Souris	Merv Tweed; 19,558; 57.06%	Martha Jo Willard; 2,836; 8.27%	John Bouché; 6,055; 17.67%	Dave Barnes; 5,410; 15.78%	Jerome Dondo; 292; 0.85%	Lisa Gallagher (Comm.); 124; 0.36%	Merv Tweed
Churchill	Wally Daudrich; 3,773; 20.50%	Tina Keeper; 5,289; 28.74%	Niki Ashton; 8,734; 47.46%	Saara Harvie; 606; 3.29%			Tina Keeper
Dauphin— Swan River— Marquette	Inky Mark; 18,132; 61.36%	Wendy Menzies; 4,128; 13.97%	Ron Strynadka; 4,914; 16.63%	Kate Storey; 1,923; 6.51%	David Andres; 356; 1.20%	Charles Prefontaine (PPP); 96; 0.32%	Inky Mark
Portage—Lisgar	Candice Hoeppner; 22,036; 68.27%	Ted Klassen; 4,374; 13.55%	Mohamed Alli; 2,353; 7.29%	Charlie Howatt; 2,606; 8.07%	Len Lodder; 911; 2.82%		Brian Pallister†
Provencher	**Vic Toews**; 23,303; 64.66%	Shirley Hiebert; 4,531; 12.57%	Ross Martin; 4,947; 13.73%	Janine Gibson; 2,089; 5.80%	David Reimer; 1,170; 3.25%		**Vic Toews**
Selkirk—Interlake	James Bezan; 23,302; 60.63%	Kevin Walsh; 3,203; 8.33%	Pat Cordner; 9,506; 24.73%	Glenda Whiteman; 2,126; 5.53%	Jane MacDiarmid; 295; 0.77%		James Bezan

=== Winnipeg ===
Electoral district	Candidates						Incumbent
Electoral district	Conservative	Liberal	NDP	Green	Christian Heritage	Other	Incumbent
Charleswood— St. James— Assiniboia	Steven Fletcher; 21,588; 53.83%	Bob Friesen; 8,514; 21.23%	Fiona Shiells; 7,190; 17.93%	Brian Timlick; 2,632; 6.56%	Mark Price; 180; 0.45%		Steven Fletcher
Elmwood—Transcona	Thomas Steen; 12,776; 40.74%	Wes Penner; 2,079; 6.63%	Jim Maloway; 14,355; 45.77%	Chris Hrynkow; 1,839; 5.86%	Robert Scott; 312; 0.99%		Bill Blaikie†
Kildonan— St. Paul	Joy Smith; 19,751; 53.40%	Lesley Hughes (Note: Lesley Hughes was on the ballot as a Liberal candidate, but was disavowed by the party.); 3,009; 8.14%	Ross Eadie; 12,093; 32.70%	Kevan Bowkett; 1,685; 4.56%	Jordan Loewen; 233; 0.63%	Eduard Hiebert (Ind.); 214; 0.58%	Joy Smith
Saint Boniface	Shelly Glover; 19,440; 46.32%	Raymond Simard; 14,728; 35.09%	Matt Schaubroeck; 5,502; 13.11%	Marc Payette; 2,104; 5.01%	Justin Gregoire; 195; 0.46%		Raymond Simard
Winnipeg Centre	Kenny Daodu; 5,437; 21.65%	Dan Hurley; 3,922; 15.62%	Pat Martin; 12,285; 48.92%	Jessie Klassen; 2,777; 11.06%		Ed Ackerman (Ind.); 135 0.54%	Pat Martin
Winnipeg Centre	Kenny Daodu; 5,437; 21.65%	Dan Hurley; 3,922; 15.62%	Pat Martin; 12,285; 48.92%	Jessie Klassen; 2,777; 11.06%		Joe Chan (Ind.); 226 0.90%	Pat Martin
Winnipeg Centre	Kenny Daodu; 5,437; 21.65%	Dan Hurley; 3,922; 15.62%	Pat Martin; 12,285; 48.92%	Jessie Klassen; 2,777; 11.06%		Lyle Morrisseau (FPNP); 212 0.84%	Pat Martin
Winnipeg Centre	Kenny Daodu; 5,437; 21.65%	Dan Hurley; 3,922; 15.62%	Pat Martin; 12,285; 48.92%	Jessie Klassen; 2,777; 11.06%		Darrell Rankin (Comm.); 119 0.47%	Pat Martin
Winnipeg North	Ray Larkin; 5,033; 22.35%	Marcelle Marion; 2,075; 9.22%	Judy Wasylycia-Leis; 14,097; 62.61%	Catherine Johannson; 1,070; 4.75%		Frank Komarniski (Comm.); 151 0.67%	Judy Wasylycia-Leis
Winnipeg North	Ray Larkin; 5,033; 22.35%	Marcelle Marion; 2,075; 9.22%	Judy Wasylycia-Leis; 14,097; 62.61%	Catherine Johannson; 1,070; 4.75%		Roger F. Poisson (PPP); 90 0.40%	Judy Wasylycia-Leis
Winnipeg South	Rod Bruinooge; 19,954; 48.84%	John Loewen; 14,221; 34.80%	Sean Robert; 4,673; 11.44%	David Cosby; 1,839; 4.50%	Heidi Loewen-Steffano; 173; 0.42%		Rod Bruinooge
Winnipeg South Centre	Trevor Kennerd; 14,103; 36.26%	Anita Neville; 16,438; 42.27%	Rachel Heinrichs; 5,490; 14.12%	Vere Scott; 2,860; 7.35%			Anita Neville

== Saskatchewan ==
=== Southern Saskatchewan ===
Electoral district	Candidates				Incumbent
Electoral district	Conservative	Liberal	NDP	Green	Incumbent
Cypress Hills—Grasslands	David Anderson; 17,922; 64.36%	Duane Filson; 3,691; 13.25%	Scott Wilson; 4,394; 15.78%	Bill Clary; 1,840; 6.61%	David Anderson
Palliser	Ray Boughen; 14,159; 44.12%	Calvin Johnston; 5,489; 17.10%	Don Mitchell; 10,865; 33.85%	Larissa Shasko; 1,580; 4.92%	Dave Batters†
Regina— Lumsden— Lake Centre	Tom Lukiwski; 16,053; 51.09%	Monica Lysack; 4,668; 14.86%	Fred Kress; 8,963; 28.53%	Nicolas Stulberg; 1,737; 5.53%	Tom Lukiwski
Regina—Qu'Appelle	Andrew Scheer; 14,068; 51.85%	Rod Flaman; 2,809; 10.35%	Janice Bernier; 8,699; 32.06%	Greg Chatterson; 1,556; 5.73%	Andrew Scheer
Souris— Moose Mountain	Ed Komarnicki; 19,293; 70.49%	Marlin Belt; 1,834; 6.70%	Raquel Fletcher; 4,599; 16.80%	Bob Deptuck; 1,643; 6.00%	Ed Komarnicki
Wascana	Michelle Hunter; 12,798; 34.64%	Ralph Goodale; 17,028; 46.08%	Stephen Moore; 5,418; 14.66%	George-Richard Wooldridge; 1,706; 4.62%	Ralph Goodale
Yorkton—Melville	Garry Breitkreuz; 19,824; 68.03%	Bryan H. Bell; 1,578; 5.41%	Doug Ottenbreit; 6,076; 20.85%	Jen Antony; 1,664; 5.71%	Garry Breitkreuz

=== Northern Saskatchewan ===
Electoral district	Candidates					Incumbent
Electoral district	Conservative	Liberal	NDP	Green	Other	Incumbent
Battlefords—Lloydminster	**Gerry Ritz**; 15,621; 60.11%	Gregory Nyholt; 2,140; 8.23%	Bob Woloshyn; 6,572; 25.29%	Norbert Kratchmer; 1,287; 4.95%	Harold Stephan (CHP); 368; 1.42%	**Gerry Ritz**
Blackstrap	Lynne Yelich; 20,747; 53.95%	Deb Ehmann; 5,509; 14.33%	Patti Gieni; 9,876; 25.68%	Imre Pallagi; 2,325; 6.05%		Lynne Yelich
Desnethé— Missinippi— Churchill River	Rob Clarke; 8,964; 46.67%	David Orchard; 5,816; 30.28%	Brian Morin; 3,414; 17.77%	George Morin; 733; 3.82%	Rob Ballantyne (FPNP); 282; 1.47%	Rob Clarke
Prince Albert	Randy Hoback; 16,542; 57.73%	Lou Doderai; 2,289; 7.99%	Valerie Mushinski; 8,243; 28.77%	Amanda Judith Marie Smytaniuk; 1,413; 4.93%	Craig Batley (CAP); 167; 0.58%	Brian Fitzpatrick†
Saskatoon—Humboldt	Brad Trost; 18,610; 53.80%	Karen Parhar; 4,135; 11.96%	Scott Ruston; 9,632; 27.85%	Jean-Pierre Ducasse; 2,211; 6.39%		Brad Trost
Saskatoon— Rosetown— Biggar	Kelly Block; 12,231; 45.39%	Roy Bluehorn; 1,188; 4.41%	Nettie Wiebe; 11,969; 44.42%	Amber Jones; 1,232; 4.57%	Rick Barsky (Ind.); 138 0.51%	Carol Skelton†
Saskatoon— Rosetown— Biggar	Kelly Block; 12,231; 45.39%	Roy Bluehorn; 1,188; 4.41%	Nettie Wiebe; 11,969; 44.42%	Amber Jones; 1,232; 4.57%	Marcel Leon Bourassa (CHP); 115 0.43%	Carol Skelton†
Saskatoon— Rosetown— Biggar	Kelly Block; 12,231; 45.39%	Roy Bluehorn; 1,188; 4.41%	Nettie Wiebe; 11,969; 44.42%	Amber Jones; 1,232; 4.57%	Kevin Stricker (Libert.); 73 0.27%	Carol Skelton†
Saskatoon—Wanuskewin	Maurice Vellacott; 18,320; 56.51%	Patricia Zipchen; 4,020; 12.40%	Clint Davidson; 7,898; 24.36%	Tobi-Dawne Smith; 2,182; 6.73%		Maurice Vellacott

== Alberta ==
=== Rural Alberta ===
Electoral district	Candidates						Incumbent
Electoral district	Conservative	Liberal	NDP	Green	Christian Heritage	Other	Incumbent
Crowfoot	Kevin Sorenson; 39,342; 82.03%	Sharon L. Howe; 1,958; 4.08%	Ellen Parker; 3,783; 7.89%	Kaitlin Kettenbach; 2,875; 5.99%			Kevin Sorenson
Fort McMurray—Athabasca	Brian Jean; 17,160; 67.12%	John Webb; 2,710; 10.60%	Mark Voyageur; 3,300; 12.91%	Dylan Richards; 1,628; 6.37%	Jacob Strydhorst; 186; 0.73%	John Malcolm (FPNP); 233 0.91%	Brian Jean
Fort McMurray—Athabasca	Brian Jean; 17,160; 67.12%	John Webb; 2,710; 10.60%	Mark Voyageur; 3,300; 12.91%	Dylan Richards; 1,628; 6.37%	Jacob Strydhorst; 186; 0.73%	Shawn Reimer (Ind.); 350 1.37%	Brian Jean
Lethbridge	Rick Casson; 31,714; 66.96%	Michael Joseph Cormican; 4,404; 9.30%	Mark Sandilands; 6,733; 14.22%	Amanda Swager; 3,420; 7.22%	Geoffrey Capp; 1,094; 2.31%		Rick Casson
Macleod	Ted Menzies; 35,328; 77.36%	Isabel Paynter; 2,703; 5.92%	Stan Knowlton; 3,053; 6.69%	Jared McCollum; 4,161; 9.11%	Marc Slingerland; 422; 0.92%		Ted Menzies
Medicine Hat	LaVar Payne; 26,950; 70.87%	Bev Botter; 2,639; 6.94%	Wally Regehr; 4,187; 11.01%	Kevin Dodd; 2,338; 6.15%	Frans Vandestroet; 363; 0.95%	David S. Patrick (Ind.); 580 1.53%	**Monte Solberg**†
Medicine Hat	LaVar Payne; 26,950; 70.87%	Bev Botter; 2,639; 6.94%	Wally Regehr; 4,187; 11.01%	Kevin Dodd; 2,338; 6.15%	Frans Vandestroet; 363; 0.95%	Dean Shock (Ind.); 971 2.55%	**Monte Solberg**†
Peace River	Chris Warkentin; 29,550; 69.51%	Liliane Maisonneuve; 2,843; 6.69%	Adele Boucher Rymhs; 6,124; 14.41%	Jennifer Villebrun; 3,303; 7.77%		Edwin Siggelkow (CAP); 373 0.88%	Chris Warkentin
Peace River	Chris Warkentin; 29,550; 69.51%	Liliane Maisonneuve; 2,843; 6.69%	Adele Boucher Rymhs; 6,124; 14.41%	Jennifer Villebrun; 3,303; 7.77%		Mélanie Simard (Libert.); 316 0.74%	Chris Warkentin
Red Deer	Earl Dreeshen; 33,226; 73.24%	Garfield Marks; 2,863; 6.31%	Stuart Somerville; 5,040; 11.11%	Evan Bedford; 4,239; 9.34%			Bob Mills†
Vegreville—Wainwright	Leon Benoit; 34,493; 77.09%	Adam Campbell; 2,345; 5.24%	Ray Stone; 4,230; 9.45%	William Munsey; 3,676; 8.22%			Leon Benoit
Westlock—St. Paul	Brian Storseth; 27,338; 72.71%	Leila Houle; 3,418; 9.09%	Della Drury; 3,809; 10.13%	Aden Murphy; 2,522; 6.71%	Sip Hofstede; 510; 1.36%		Brian Storseth
Wetaskiwin	Blaine Calkins; 32,528; 77.14%	Rita Katherine Dillon; 2,362; 5.60%	Tim Robson; 3,636; 8.62%	Les Parsons; 3,395; 8.05%		Shawn Mann (CAP); 249; 0.59%	Blaine Calkins
Wild Rose	Blake Richards; 36,869; 72.92%	Jenn Turcott; 2,890; 5.72%	Jeff Horvath; 4,169; 8.24%	Lisa Fox; 6,390; 12.64%		Krista Zoobkoff (Libert.); 246; 0.49%	Myron Thompson†
Yellowhead	Rob Merrifield; 26,863; 71.85%	Mohamed El-Rafih; 1,489; 3.98%	Ken Kuzminski; 4,587; 12.27%	Monika Schaefer; 3,437; 9.19%	John M. Wierenga; 606; 1.62%	Melissa Brade (CAP); 408; 1.09%	Rob Merrifield

=== Edmonton and environs ===
Electoral district	Candidates					Incumbent
Electoral district	Conservative	Liberal	NDP	Green	Other	Incumbent
Edmonton Centre	Laurie Hawn; 22,634; 49.04%	Jim Wachowich; 12,661; 27.43%	Donna Martyn; 6,912; 14.98%	David James Parker; 3,746; 8.12%	Peggy Morton (M-L); 203; 0.44%	Laurie Hawn
Edmonton East	Peter Goldring; 21,487; 51.32%	Stephanie Laskoski; 4,578; 10.93%	Ray Martin; 13,318; 31.81%	Trey Capnerhurst; 2,488; 5.94%		Peter Goldring
Edmonton—Leduc	James Rajotte; 33,174; 63.21%	Donna Lynn Smith; 9,234; 17.59%	Hana Razga; 5,994; 11.42%	Valerie Kennedy; 4,081; 7.78%		James Rajotte
Edmonton—Mill Woods— Beaumont	Mike Lake; 25,130; 60.32%	Indira Saroya; 7,709; 18.51%	Mike Butler; 6,297; 15.12%	David Allan Hrushka; 2,366; 5.68%	Naomi Rankin (Comm.); 157; 0.38%	Mike Lake
Edmonton—St. Albert	Brent Rathgeber; 31,436; 61.65%	Sam Sleiman; 7,441; 14.59%	Dave Burkhart; 8,045; 15.78%	Peter Johnston; 4,072; 7.99%		John Williams†
Edmonton—Sherwood Park	Tim Uppal; 17,628; 35.84%	Rick Szostak; 5,575; 11.34%	Brian LaBelle; 6,339; 12.89%	Nina Erfani; 3,678; 7.48%	James Ford (Ind.); 15,960; 32.45%	Ken Epp†
Edmonton—Spruce Grove	Rona Ambrose; 36,402; 68.55%	Chris Austin; 6,099; 11.49%	Barb Phillips; 6,627; 12.48%	Wendy Walker; 3,975; 7.49%		**Rona Ambrose**
Edmonton—Strathcona	Rahim Jaffer; 19,640; 41.60%	Claudette Roy; 4,279; 9.06%	Linda Duncan; 20,103; 42.58%	Jane Thrall; 3,040; 6.44%	Kevan Hunter (M-L); 147; 0.31%	Rahim Jaffer

=== Calgary ===
Electoral district	Candidates					Incumbent
Electoral district	Conservative	Liberal	NDP	Green	Other	Incumbent
Calgary Centre	Lee Richardson; 26,085; 55.60%	Heesung Kim; 8,402; 17.91%	Tyler Kinch; 4,229; 9.01%	Natalie Odd; 7,778; 16.58%	Antony Tony Grochowski (Ind.); 420; 0.90%	Lee Richardson
Calgary Centre-North	**Jim Prentice**; 27,361; 56.54%	Doug James; 5,699; 11.78%	John Chan; 7,413; 15.32%	Eric Donovan; 7,392; 15.27%	Peggy Askin (M-L); 184 0.38%	**Jim Prentice**
Calgary Centre-North	**Jim Prentice**; 27,361; 56.54%	Doug James; 5,699; 11.78%	John Chan; 7,413; 15.32%	Eric Donovan; 7,392; 15.27%	Jason E. McNeil (Libert.); 345 0.71%	**Jim Prentice**
Calgary East	Deepak Obhrai; 21,311; 66.47%	Bernie Kennedy; 3,255; 10.15%	Ian Vaughan; 3,768; 11.75%	Nathan David Coates; 3,403; 10.61%	Jason Devine (Comm.); 323; 1.01%	Deepak Obhrai
Calgary Northeast	Devinder Shory; 18,917; 51.52%	Sanam S. Kang; 7,433; 20.24%	Vinay Dey; 3,279; 8.93%	Abeed Monty Ahmad; 2,045; 5.57%	Daniel Blanchard (M-L); 211 0.57%	Art Hanger†
Calgary Northeast	Devinder Shory; 18,917; 51.52%	Sanam S. Kang; 7,433; 20.24%	Vinay Dey; 3,279; 8.93%	Abeed Monty Ahmad; 2,045; 5.57%	Roger Richard (NA); 4,836 13.17%	Art Hanger†
Calgary—Nose Hill	**Diane Ablonczy**; 35,029; 69.62%	Anoush Newman; 6,657; 13.23%	Stephanie Sundberg; 3,941; 7.83%	Tony Hajj; 4,685; 9.31%		**Diane Ablonczy**
Calgary Southeast	**Jason Kenney**; 41,425; 73.89%	Brad Carroll; 4,878; 8.70%	Chris Willott; 4,024; 7.18%	Margaret Chandler; 5,736; 10.23%		**Jason Kenney**
Calgary Southwest	**Stephen Harper**; 38,548; 72.96%	Marlene Lamontagne; 4,918; 9.31%	Holly Heffernan; 4,102; 7.76%	Kelly Christie; 4,743; 8.98%	Larry R. Heather (CHP); 256 0.48%	**Stephen Harper**
Calgary Southwest	**Stephen Harper**; 38,548; 72.96%	Marlene Lamontagne; 4,918; 9.31%	Holly Heffernan; 4,102; 7.76%	Kelly Christie; 4,743; 8.98%	Dennis Young (Libert.); 265 0.50%	**Stephen Harper**
Calgary West	Rob Anders; 34,579; 57.36%	Jennifer Pollock; 13,204; 21.90%	Teale Phelps Bondaroff; 3,832; 6.36%	Randy Weeks; 6,722; 11.15%	Kirk Schmidt (Ind.); 1,790 2.97%	Rob Anders
Calgary West	Rob Anders; 34,579; 57.36%	Jennifer Pollock; 13,204; 21.90%	Teale Phelps Bondaroff; 3,832; 6.36%	Randy Weeks; 6,722; 11.15%	André Vachon (M-L); 155 0.26%	Rob Anders

== British Columbia ==
=== BC Interior ===
Electoral district	Candidates					Incumbent
Electoral district	Conservative	Liberal	NDP	Green	Other	Incumbent
British Columbia Southern Interior	Rob Zandee; 17,122; 35.85%	Brenda Jagpal; 3,292; 6.89%	Alex Atamanenko; 22,693; 47.51%	Andy Morel; 4,573; 9.57%	Brian Sproule (M-L); 80; 0.17%	Alex Atamanenko
Cariboo— Prince George	Dick Harris; 22,637; 55.39%	Drew Adamick; 4,309; 10.54%	Bev Collins; 10,581; 25.89%	Amber Van Drielen; 2,614; 6.40%	Douglas Gook (Ind.); 729; 1.78%	Dick Harris
Kamloops— Thompson— Cariboo	Cathy McLeod; 25,209; 46.16%	Ken Sommerfeld; 5,375; 9.84%	Michael Crawford; 19,601; 35.89%	Donovan Grube Cavers; 4,430; 8.11%		Betty Hinton†
Kelowna— Lake Country	Ron Cannan; 31,907; 55.94%	Diana Cabott; 8,469; 14.85%	Tish Lakes; 8,624; 15.12%	Angela Reid; 7,821; 13.71%	Mark Haley (Comm.); 218; 0.38%	Ron Cannan
Kootenay—Columbia	Jim Abbott; 23,402; 59.59%	Betty Aitchison; 3,044; 7.75%	Leon R. Pendleton; 8,892; 22.64%	Ralph Moore; 3,933; 10.02%		Jim Abbott
Okanagan—Coquihalla	**Stockwell Day**; 28,765; 58.13%	Valerie Hallford; 5,883; 11.89%	Ralph Poynting; 8,236; 16.64%	Dan Bouchard; 6,603; 13.34%		**Stockwell Day**
Okanagan—Shuswap	Colin Mayes; 28,002; 51.72%	Janna Francis; 5,414; 10.00%	Alice Brown; 10,664; 19.70%	Huguette Allen; 9,368; 17.30%	Gordie Campbell (NA); 416 0.77%	Colin Mayes
Okanagan—Shuswap	Colin Mayes; 28,002; 51.72%	Janna Francis; 5,414; 10.00%	Alice Brown; 10,664; 19.70%	Huguette Allen; 9,368; 17.30%	Darren Seymour (CAP); 278 0.51%	Colin Mayes
Prince George— Peace River	**Jay Hill**; 22,325; 63.59%	Lindsay Gidney; 2,954; 8.41%	Betty Bekkering; 6,170; 17.58%	Hilary Crowley; 3,656; 10.41%		**Jay Hill**
Skeena— Bulkley Valley	Sharon Smith; 12,561; 36.36%	Corinna Morhart; 1,916; 5.55%	Nathan Cullen; 17,219; 49.84%	Hondo Arendt; 1,613; 4.67%	Mary-Etta Goodacre (CAP); 112 0.32%	Nathan Cullen
Skeena— Bulkley Valley	Sharon Smith; 12,561; 36.36%	Corinna Morhart; 1,916; 5.55%	Nathan Cullen; 17,219; 49.84%	Hondo Arendt; 1,613; 4.67%	Rod Taylor (CHP); 1,125 3.26%	Nathan Cullen

=== Fraser Valley and Southern Lower Mainland ===
Electoral district	Candidates					Incumbent
Electoral district	Conservative	Liberal	NDP	Green	Other	Incumbent
Abbotsford	Ed Fast; 30,853; 63.32%	Lionel Dominique Traverse; 7,933; 16.28%	Bonnie Rai; 6,444; 13.22%	Karen Durant; 3,141; 6.45%	Tim Felger (Mar.); 358; 0.73%	Ed Fast
Chilliwack— Fraser Canyon	**Chuck Strahl**; 29,198; 62.32%	Myra Sweeney; 3,990; 8.52%	Helen Kormendy; 8,791; 18.76%	Barbara Lebeau; 4,107; 8.77%	Harold J. Ludwig (CHP); 653 1.39%	**Chuck Strahl**
Chilliwack— Fraser Canyon	**Chuck Strahl**; 29,198; 62.32%	Myra Sweeney; 3,990; 8.52%	Helen Kormendy; 8,791; 18.76%	Barbara Lebeau; 4,107; 8.77%	Dorothy-Jean O'Donnell (M-L); 113 0.24%	**Chuck Strahl**
Delta— Richmond East	John Cummins; 26,252; 55.75%	Dana L. Miller; 10,371; 22.02%	Szilvia Barna; 6,803; 14.45%	Matthew Laine; 3,663; 7.78%		John Cummins
Fleetwood— Port Kells	Nina Grewal; 21,389; 44.70%	Brenda Locke; 12,502; 26.13%	Nao Fernando; 10,916; 22.81%	Brian Newbold; 3,045; 6.36%		Nina Grewal
Langley	Mark Warawa; 32,594; 61.46%	Jake Gray; 5,888; 11.10%	Andrew Claxton; 8,898; 16.78%	Patrick Meyer; 5,059; 9.54%	Ron Gray (CHP); 594; 1.12%	Mark Warawa
Newton— North Delta	Sandeep Pandher; 13,988; 30.91%	Sukh Dhaliwal; 16,481; 36.42%	Teresa Townsley; 11,824; 26.13%	Liz Walker; 2,533; 5.60%	Harjit Daudharia (Comm.); 121 0.27%	Sukh Dhaliwal
Newton— North Delta	Sandeep Pandher; 13,988; 30.91%	Sukh Dhaliwal; 16,481; 36.42%	Teresa Townsley; 11,824; 26.13%	Liz Walker; 2,533; 5.60%	James William Miller-Cousineau (Ind.); 179 0.40%	Sukh Dhaliwal
Newton— North Delta	Sandeep Pandher; 13,988; 30.91%	Sukh Dhaliwal; 16,481; 36.42%	Teresa Townsley; 11,824; 26.13%	Liz Walker; 2,533; 5.60%	John Shavluk (Ind.); 126 0.28%	Sukh Dhaliwal
Pitt Meadows— Maple Ridge— Mission	Randy Kamp; 26,512; 51.81%	Dan Olson; 3,394; 6.63%	Mike Bocking; 16,894; 33.01%	Mike Gildersleeve; 3,833; 7.49%	Jeff Monds (Libert.); 300 0.59%	Randy Kamp
Pitt Meadows— Maple Ridge— Mission	Randy Kamp; 26,512; 51.81%	Dan Olson; 3,394; 6.63%	Mike Bocking; 16,894; 33.01%	Mike Gildersleeve; 3,833; 7.49%	Evans Nicholson (Ind.); 137 0.27%	Randy Kamp
Pitt Meadows— Maple Ridge— Mission	Randy Kamp; 26,512; 51.81%	Dan Olson; 3,394; 6.63%	Mike Bocking; 16,894; 33.01%	Mike Gildersleeve; 3,833; 7.49%	Chum Richardson (Ind.); 101 0.20%	Randy Kamp
Richmond	Alice Wong; 21,359; 49.81%	Raymond Chan; 13,221; 30.83%	Dale Jackaman; 5,059; 11.80%	Michael Anthony Wolfe; 2,753; 6.42%	Wei Ping Chen (Ind.); 395 0.92%	Raymond Chan
Richmond	Alice Wong; 21,359; 49.81%	Raymond Chan; 13,221; 30.83%	Dale Jackaman; 5,059; 11.80%	Michael Anthony Wolfe; 2,753; 6.42%	Dobie Yiu-Chung To (Ind.); 91 0.21%	Raymond Chan
South Surrey— White Rock— Cloverdale	Russ Hiebert; 31,216; 56.65%	Judy Higginbotham; 11,515; 20.90%	Peter Prontzos; 7,146; 12.97%	David Blair; 4,951; 8.99%	Brian Marlatt (PC) 273; 0.50%	Russ Hiebert
Surrey North	Dona Cadman; 13,714; 39.37%	Marc Muhammad; 5,227; 15.01%	Rachid Arab; 12,608; 36.20%	Dan Kashamanga; 1,925; 5.53%	Psam Frank (CAP); 105 0.30%	Penny Priddy†
Surrey North	Dona Cadman; 13,714; 39.37%	Marc Muhammad; 5,227; 15.01%	Rachid Arab; 12,608; 36.20%	Dan Kashamanga; 1,925; 5.53%	Alex Joehl (Libert.); 347 1.00%	Penny Priddy†
Surrey North	Dona Cadman; 13,714; 39.37%	Marc Muhammad; 5,227; 15.01%	Rachid Arab; 12,608; 36.20%	Dan Kashamanga; 1,925; 5.53%	Bernadette Keenan (Ind.); 271 0.78%	Penny Priddy†
Surrey North	Dona Cadman; 13,714; 39.37%	Marc Muhammad; 5,227; 15.01%	Rachid Arab; 12,608; 36.20%	Dan Kashamanga; 1,925; 5.53%	Nikolas Langlands (PC); 152 0.44%	Penny Priddy†
Surrey North	Dona Cadman; 13,714; 39.37%	Marc Muhammad; 5,227; 15.01%	Rachid Arab; 12,608; 36.20%	Dan Kashamanga; 1,925; 5.53%	Kevin Pielak (CHP); 484 1.39%	Penny Priddy†

=== Vancouver and Northern Lower Mainland ===
Electoral district	Candidates						Incumbent
Electoral district	Conservative	Liberal	NDP	Green	Libertarian	Other	Incumbent
Burnaby— Douglas	Ronald Leung; 17,139; 36.25%	Bill Cunningham; 9,177; 19.41%	Bill Siksay; 17,937; 37.94%	Doug Perry; 2,822; 5.97%		George Gidora (Comm.); 203; 0.43%	Bill Siksay
Burnaby— New Westminster	Sam Rakhra; 13,150; 30.35%	Gerry Lenoski; 6,681; 15.42%	Peter Julian; 20,145; 46.50%	Carrie McLaren; 3,067; 7.08%	Ismet Yetison; 186; 0.43%	Joseph Theriault (M-L); 96; 0.22%	Peter Julian
New Westminster— Coquitlam	Yonah Martin; 19,299; 38.84%	Michelle Hassen; 5,615; 11.30%	Dawn Black; 20,787; 41.83%	Marshall Smith; 3,574; 7.19%	Lewis C. Dahlby; 314; 0.63%	Roland Verrier (M-L); 103; 0.21%	Dawn Black
North Vancouver	Andrew Saxton; 24,371; 42.26%	Don Bell; 21,551; 37.37%	Michael Charrois; 5,417; 9.39%	Jim Stephenson; 6,168; 10.69%	Tunya Audain; 166; 0.29%		Don Bell
Port Moody— Westwood— Port Coquitlam	James Moore; 25,535; 54.61%	Ron McKinnon; 6,918; 14.79%	Zoë Royer; 10,418; 22.28%	Rod Brindamour; 3,568; 7.63%	Rob Gillespie; 321; 0.69%		James Moore
Vancouver Centre	Lorne Mayencourt; 14,118; 25.10%	Hedy Fry; 19,506; 34.51%	Michael Byers; 12,047; 21.31%	Adriane Carr; 10,354; 18.32%	John Clarke; 340; 0.60%	Michael Hill (M-L); 94; 0.17%	Hedy Fry
Vancouver East	Ryan Warawa; 6,432; 15.55%	Ken Low; 7,127; 17.23%	Libby Davies; 22,506; 54.40%	Mike Carr; 4,708; 11.38%		Anne Jamieson (M-L); 171 0.41%	Libby Davies
Vancouver East	Ryan Warawa; 6,432; 15.55%	Ken Low; 7,127; 17.23%	Libby Davies; 22,506; 54.40%	Mike Carr; 4,708; 11.38%		Betty Krawczyk (WLP); 425 1.03%	Libby Davies
Vancouver Kingsway	Salomon Rayek; 12,419; 27.42%	Wendy Yuan; 13,164; 29.06%	Don Davies; 15,933; 35.18%	Doug Warkentin; 3,031; 6.69%	Matt Kadioglu; 309; 0.68%	Kimball Cariou (Comm.); 291 0.64%	**David Emerson**†
Vancouver Kingsway	Salomon Rayek; 12,419; 27.42%	Wendy Yuan; 13,164; 29.06%	Don Davies; 15,933; 35.18%	Doug Warkentin; 3,031; 6.69%	Matt Kadioglu; 309; 0.68%	Donna Petersen (M-L); 149 0.33%	**David Emerson**†
Vancouver Quadra	Deborah Meredith; 20,561; 36.92%	Joyce Murray; 25,393; 45.59%	David Caplan; 4,493; 8.07%	Dan Grice; 4,916; 8.83%	Noris Barens; 333; 0.60%		Joyce Murray
Vancouver South	Wai Young; 16,090; 38.44%	Ujjal Dosanjh; 16,110; 38.49%	Ann Chambers; 7,376; 17.62%	Csaba Gulyas; 2,065; 4.93%		Charles Boylan (M-L); 211; 0.50%	Ujjal Dosanjh
West Vancouver— Sunshine Coast— Sea to Sky Country	John Weston; 26,949; 44.57%	Ian Sutherland; 16,069; 26.57%	Bill Forst; 8,728; 14.43%	Blair Wilson; 8,723; 14.43%			Blair Wilson

=== Vancouver Island ===
Electoral district	Candidates					Incumbent
Electoral district	Conservative	Liberal	NDP	Green	Other	Incumbent
Esquimalt—Juan de Fuca	Troy DeSouza; 19,974; 34.07%	Keith Martin; 20,042; 34.18%	Jennifer Burgis; 13,322; 22.72%	Brian G. Gordon; 4,854; 8.28%	Philip G. Ney (Ind.); 309 0.53%	Keith Martin
Esquimalt—Juan de Fuca	Troy DeSouza; 19,974; 34.07%	Keith Martin; 20,042; 34.18%	Jennifer Burgis; 13,322; 22.72%	Brian G. Gordon; 4,854; 8.28%	Brad Rhodes (CAP); 130 0.22%	Keith Martin
Nanaimo—Alberni	James Lunney; 28,930; 46.68%	Richard Pesik; 5,578; 9.00%	Zeni Maartman; 19,680; 31.75%	John Fryer; 7,457; 12.03%	Barbara Biley (M-L); 155 0.25%	James Lunney
Nanaimo—Alberni	James Lunney; 28,930; 46.68%	Richard Pesik; 5,578; 9.00%	Zeni Maartman; 19,680; 31.75%	John Fryer; 7,457; 12.03%	Frank Wagner (CHP); 176 0.28%	James Lunney
Nanaimo—Cowichan	Reed Elley; 22,844; 37.59%	Brian Scott; 4,483; 7.38%	Jean Crowder; 27,454; 45.17%	Christina Knighton; 5,816; 9.57%	Jack East (M-L); 182; 0.30%	Jean Crowder
Saanich—Gulf Islands	**Gary Lunn**; 27,991; 43.42%	Briony Penn; 25,366; 39.35%	Julian West (Note: Julian West stepped down, however his name remained on the ballot.); 3,667; 5.69%	Andrew Lewis; 6,742; 10.46%	Jeremy Arney (CAP); 139 0.22%	**Gary Lunn**
Saanich—Gulf Islands	**Gary Lunn**; 27,991; 43.42%	Briony Penn; 25,366; 39.35%	Julian West; 3,667; 5.69%	Andrew Lewis; 6,742; 10.46%	Dale P. Leier (Libert.); 246 0.38%	**Gary Lunn**
Saanich—Gulf Islands	**Gary Lunn**; 27,991; 43.42%	Briony Penn; 25,366; 39.35%	Julian West; 3,667; 5.69%	Andrew Lewis; 6,742; 10.46%	Dan Moreau (CHP); 114 0.18%	**Gary Lunn**
Saanich—Gulf Islands	**Gary Lunn**; 27,991; 43.42%	Briony Penn; 25,366; 39.35%	Julian West; 3,667; 5.69%	Andrew Lewis; 6,742; 10.46%	Patricia O'Brien (WBP); 195 0.30%	**Gary Lunn**
Vancouver Island North	John Duncan; 25,963; 45.78%	Geoff Fleischer; 2,380; 4.20%	Catherine Bell; 23,466; 41.38%	Philip Stone; 4,544; 8.01%	Jason Draper (Ind.); 362; 0.64%	Catherine Bell
Victoria	Jack McClintock; 16,337; 27.56%	Anne Park Shannon; 10,006; 16.88%	Denise Savoie; 26,443; 44.61%	Adam Saab; 6,252; 10.55%	John Cooper (CHP); 237; 0.40%	Denise Savoie

== Nunavut ==
Electoral district	Candidates				Incumbent
Electoral district	Conservative	Liberal	NDP	Green	Incumbent
Nunavut	Leona Aglukkaq; 2,815; 34.92%	Kirt Kootoo Ejesiak; 2,349; 29.14%	Paul Irngaut; 2,228; 27.64%	Peter Ittinuar; 669; 8.30%	Nancy Karetak-Lindell†

== Northwest Territories ==
Electoral district	Candidates					Incumbent
Electoral district	Conservative	Liberal	NDP	Green	FPNP	Incumbent
Western Arctic	Brendan Bell; 5,146; 37.63%	Gabrielle Mackenzie-Scott; 1,858; 13.58%	Dennis Bevington; 5,669; 41.45%	Sam Gamble; 752; 5.50%	Noeline Villebrun; 252; 1.84%	Dennis Bevington

== Yukon ==
Electoral district	Candidates				Incumbent
Electoral district	Conservative	Liberal	NDP	Green	Incumbent
Yukon	Darrell Pasloski; 4,788; 32.66%	Larry Bagnell; 6,715; 45.80%	Ken Bolton; 1,276; 8.70%	John Streicker; 1,881; 12.83%	Larry Bagnell

== See also ==
- Results of the Canadian federal election, 2004
- Results by riding of the Canadian federal election, 2006
- Results of the Canadian federal election, 2008
- Results by riding of the Canadian federal election, 2011
