= Parkdale—High Park =

Parkdale—High Park may refer to:

- Parkdale—High Park (federal electoral district), federal riding in Toronto, Ontario, Canada
- Parkdale—High Park (provincial electoral district), provincial riding in Toronto, Ontario, Canada
- Ward 4 Parkdale—High Park, municipal ward in Toronto, Ontario, Canada
