= Scarborough—Agincourt =

Scarborough—Agincourt may refer to:

- Scarborough—Agincourt (federal electoral district), federal riding in Toronto, Ontario, Canada
- Scarborough—Agincourt (provincial electoral district), provincial riding in Toronto, Ontario, Canada
- Ward 22 Scarborough—Agincourt, municipal ward in Toronto, Ontario, Canada
