= Geoffrion =

Geoffrion is a surname. Notable people with the surname include:

- Alan Geoffrion, writer and author of Broken Trail
- Amédée Geoffrion (1867–1935), lawyer and politician in Quebec, Canada
- Bernie Geoffrion (1931–2006), nicknamed Boom Boom, Canadian professional ice hockey player and coach
- Blake Geoffrion (born 1988), American former professional ice hockey player
- Christophe-Alphonse Geoffrion, PC (1843–1899), Canadian lawyer, professor, and politician
- Dan Geoffrion (born 1958), retired professional ice hockey player
- Félix Geoffrion, PC (1832–1894), Canadian notary and politician
- Moira Geoffrion (born 1944), American sculptor
- Scott Geoffrion (1965–2006), NHRA drag racing driver
- Serge Geoffrion (born 1955), Quebec politician and journalist
- Victor Geoffrion (1851–1923), Canadian politician

== See also ==
- Gefion (disambiguation)
