= Marcel Danis =

Canadian politician (born 1943)

The Honourable Marcel Danis PC

Member of the Canadian Parliament for Verchères
- In office September 4, 1984 – September 8, 1993
- Preceded by: Bernard Loiselle
- Succeeded by: Stéphane Bergeron

Personal details
- Born: October 22, 1943 (age 82)
- Party: Progressive Conservative Party of Canada
- Occupation: Lawyer

Marcel Danis, PC (born October 22, 1943) is a Canadian university administrator, lawyer and former politician.

Danis completed a Bachelor of Arts in political science at Loyola College (since renamed Concordia University) in 1965, a Master of Arts in political science at Fordham University in 1966, studied constitutional law and political science at the Université de Paris from 1966 to 1968, and completed a Bachelor of Civil Law at the Université de Montréal in 1971. His father was a judge of the Superior Court of Quebec, and his brother, Jean-Claude Danis, is a judge at the Commission des lésions professionelles in Montreal.

He joined the faculty of Loyola College in 1968 as a lecturer in the Department of Political Science and has taught since that time. He entered politics as a Progressive Conservative candidate in the 1980 federal election, but was defeated in the riding of Saint-Hyacinthe, Quebec. During Joe Clark's leadership convention candidacy in 1983, Danis was his chief Quebec organizer.

He ran again in the 1984 federal election and entered the House of Commons of Canada as the Tory Member of Parliament for Verchères. Danis was appointed Deputy Speaker of the House of Commons of Canada, and served in that position until 1990 when he was appointed by Prime Minister Brian Mulroney to the Cabinet as Minister of State for Fitness and Sport, and Minister of State for Youth. He served concurrently as deputy government House Leader.

In 1991, Danis was promoted to the position of Minister of Labour. He left Cabinet with Mulroney's retirement in 1993, and was not a candidate in the 1993 election. He left politics and returned to academia. He became vice-dean in the Faculty of Arts and Science at Concordia. In 1996, he became vice-rector of the university, and Secretary General in 1998. In 2005, he was named vice-president of external relations and secretary-general.

In 2013, he was hired to defend Michael Applebaum, the former mayor of Montreal, on corruption charges.
