= Beloeil—Chambly =

Federal electoral district in Quebec, Canada

Quebec electoral district
- Interactive map of riding boundaries from the 2025 federal election

Federal electoral district
- Legislature: House of Commons
MP
Yves-François Blanchet
Bloc Québécois
- District created: 2013
- First contested: 2015
- Last contested: 2025
- District webpage: profile, map

Demographics
- Population (2016): 117,343
- Electors (2019): 95,723
- Area (km²): 378.26
- Pop. density (per km²): 310.2
- Census division(s): La Vallée-du-Richelieu, Rouville
- Census subdivision(s): Chambly, Beloeil, Mont-Saint-Hilaire, Carignan (part), Marieville, Otterburn Park, McMasterville, Richelieu, Saint-Mathias-sur-Richelieu, Saint-Jean-Baptiste

Beloeil—Chambly (officially Belœil—Chambly) is a federal electoral district (riding) in Quebec, Canada. It encompasses a portion of Montérégie.

Beloeil—Chambly was created by the 2012 federal electoral boundaries redistribution out of part of Chambly—Borduas. It was legally defined in the 2013 representation order and came into effect upon the call of the 2015 federal election. The name was altered slightly to Belœil—Chambly beginning with the 2025 federal election.

Since 2019, its member of Parliament (MP) has been Yves-François Blanchet, the leader of the Bloc Québécois (BQ).

Following the 2022 Canadian federal electoral redistribution, it lost Carignan to Mont-Saint-Bruno—L'Acadie.

== Profile ==
The NDP did well against the Bloc in the region in the 2011 election, when results are applied to the new riding's boundaries. There was little variation in support for most parties from one part of the riding to another. In the 2015 federal election, the Bloc saw a slight bump in support, while the Liberals jumped more than 20 percentage points, mostly at the expense of the NDP. In the 2019 election, the Bloc Québécois took control of the seat with a substantial margin, and held onto it in the 2021 election.

== Demographics ==
According to the 2011 Canadian census; 2013 representation

Ethnic groups: 97.2% White
Languages: 94.4% French, 4.4% English
Religions: 85.8% Christian (82.0% Catholic, 3.7% Other), 13.6% No religion
Median income (2010): $35,198
Average income (2010): $42,142

== Members of Parliament ==
This riding has elected the following members of Parliament:

Parliament	Years	Member	Party
Beloeil—Chambly; Riding created from Chambly—Borduas
42nd	2015–2019	Matthew Dubé	New Democratic
43rd	2019–2021	Yves-François Blanchet	Bloc Québécois
44th	2021–2025	Yves-François Blanchet	Bloc Québécois
45th	2025–present	Yves-François Blanchet	Bloc Québécois

== Election results ==
Graph of election results in Beloeil—Chambly 2013-present (minor parties that never got 2% of the vote or didn't run consistently are omitted)

2025 Canadian federal election
Party	Candidate	Votes	%	±%	Expenditures
Bloc Québécois	Yves-François Blanchet	32,844	48.26	−5.27	
Liberal	Nicholas Malouin	23,136	34.00	+10.57	
Conservative	Sylvain Goulet	9,199	13.52	+5.13	
New Democratic	Marie-Josée Béliveau	2,391	3.51	−5.01	
People's	Nicholas Manes	482	0.71	−1.31	
Total valid votes/expense limit		68,524	98.74		
Total rejected ballots		873	1.26		
Turnout		69,397	76.07		
Eligible voters		91,233			
Bloc Québécois notional hold		Swing		−7.92	
Source: Elections Canada
Note: number of eligible voters does not include voting day registrations.

2021 federal election redistributed results
Party	Vote	%
Bloc Québécois	32,161	53.53
Liberal	14,079	23.43
New Democratic	5,117	8.52
Conservative	5,041	8.39
People's	1,212	2.02
Green	1,199	2.00
Others	1,268	2.11

2021 Canadian federal election
Party	Candidate	Votes	%	±%	Expenditures
Bloc Québécois	Yves-François Blanchet	34,678	53.1	+2.5	$44,405.09
Liberal	Marie-Chantal Hamel	15,460	23.7	−0.1	$20,410.86
Conservative	Stéphane Robichaud	5,622	8.6	+2.8	$1,228.76
New Democratic	Marie-Josée Béliveau	5,525	8.5	−6.5	$1,187.30
People's	Danila Ejov	1,344	2.1	+1.5	$5.00
Green	Fabrice Gélinas Larrain	1,294	2.0	−2.7	$1,848.81
Free	Mario Grimard	845	1.3	—	$1,113.55
Marijuana	Benjamin Vachon	191	0.3	—	$0.00
Rhinoceros	Thomas Thibault-Vincent	185	0.3	—	$0.00
Indépendance du Québec	Michel Blondin	163	0.2	—	$0.00
Total valid votes/expense limit		65,324	98.3	—	$124,082.82
Total rejected ballots		1,109	1.7		
Turnout		66,433	68.7		
Eligible voters		96,633			
Bloc Québécois hold		Swing		+1.3	
Source: Elections Canada

2019 Canadian federal election
Party	Candidate	Votes	%	±%	Expenditures
Bloc Québécois	Yves-François Blanchet	35,068	50.5	+22.82	$36,540.34
Liberal	Marie-Chantal Hamel	16,059	23.1	−6.24	$62,823.63
New Democratic	Matthew Dubé	10,086	14.5	−16.57	$20,636.78
Conservative	Véronique Laprise	4,305	6.2	−3.09	$0.00
Green	Pierre Carrier	3,255	4.7	+2.45	$18,235.50
People's	Chloé Bernard	512	0.7	—	$5,931.38
Indépendance du Québec	Michel Blondin	205	0.3	—	$768.82
Total valid votes/expense limit		69,490	100.0		
Total rejected ballots		1,064			
Turnout		70,554	73.7		
Eligible voters		95,723			
Bloc Québécois gain from New Democratic		Swing		+19.79	
Source: Elections Canada

2015 Canadian federal election
Party	Candidate	Votes	%	±%	Expenditures
New Democratic	Matthew Dubé	20,641	31.07	−11.53	$37,588.92
Liberal	Karine Desjardins	19,494	29.34	+20.32	$13,921.30
Bloc Québécois	Yves Lessard	18,387	27.68	+0.27	$42,490.04
Conservative	Claude Chalhoub	6,173	9.29	+1.35	$3,916.18
Green	Fodé Kerfalla Yansané	1,498	2.25	+0.70	$2,528.52
Libertarian	Michael Maher	245	0.37	–	–
Total valid votes/Expense limit		–	100.00		$233,044.70
Total rejected ballots		950	1.41	–	
Turnout		67,388	74.00	–	
Eligible voters		91,068			
New Democratic hold		Swing		−15.93	
Source: Elections Canada

2011 federal election redistributed results
Party	Vote	%
New Democratic	25,008	42.60
Bloc Québécois	16,091	27.41
Independent	6,734	11.47
Liberal	5,295	9.02
Conservative	4,665	7.95
Green	914	1.56

== See also ==
- List of Canadian electoral districts
- Historical federal electoral districts of Canada
