= Yvon L'Heureux =

Canadian politician (1914–1984)

Yvon L'heureux

Member of the Canadian Parliament for Chambly—Rouville
- In office June 1957 – March 1958
- Preceded by: Roch Pinard
- Succeeded by: Maurice Johnson

Member of Parliament for Chambly
- In office May 1971 – May 1974
- Preceded by: Bernard Pilon
- Succeeded by: Bernard Loiselle

Personal details
- Born: 20 March 1914 Saint-Cyrille-de-Wendover, Quebec, Canada
- Died: 29 May 1984 (aged 70)
- Party: Liberal
- Profession: Manufacturer, merchant

Yvon L'Heureux (20 March 1914 – 29 May 1984) was a Liberal party member of the House of Commons of Canada. He was a manufacturer and merchant by career.

He was first elected at the Chambly—Rouville riding in the 1957 general election. After serving his term in the 23rd Canadian Parliament, L'Heureux was defeated in the 1958 election by Maurice Johnson of the Progressive Conservative Party.

L'Heureux returned to Parliament in a 31 May 1971 by-election at the Chambly riding following the death of incumbent Liberal member Bernard Pilon. After re-election in the 1972 federal election, L'Heureux returned to serve his term in the 29th Parliament. After this, he left federal office in 1974 and did not campaign in that year's federal election.

== Election results ==
1972 Canadian federal election: Chambly
Party	Candidate	Votes	%	±%
Liberal	Yvon L'Heureux	26,532	53.22	-13.35
Social Credit	Anaclet Bruneau	8,728	17.51	–
Progressive Conservative	Claude Durocher	8,151	16.35	+9.90
New Democratic	Emile Boudreau	5,532	11.10	-9.96
Independent	Claude Longtin	474	0.95	-0.67
Independent	Lucien Rivard	435	0.87	–
Total valid votes		49,852	100.00	

Canadian federal by-election, May 31, 1971: Chambly On Mr. Pilon's death, 17 November 1970.
Party	Candidate	Votes	%	±%
Liberal	Yvon L'Heureux	16,243	66.57	+0.25
New Democratic	Emile Boudreau	5,138	21.06	+11.17
Progressive Conservative	Léopold Hamel	1,573	6.45	-13.18
Independent	Jean-Margaret McGlynn	1,049	4.30	–
Republican	Claude Longtin	396	1.62	–
Total valid votes		24,399	100.00	
Source: lop.parl.ca
