= Stéphane Bergeron =

Canadian politician (born 1965)

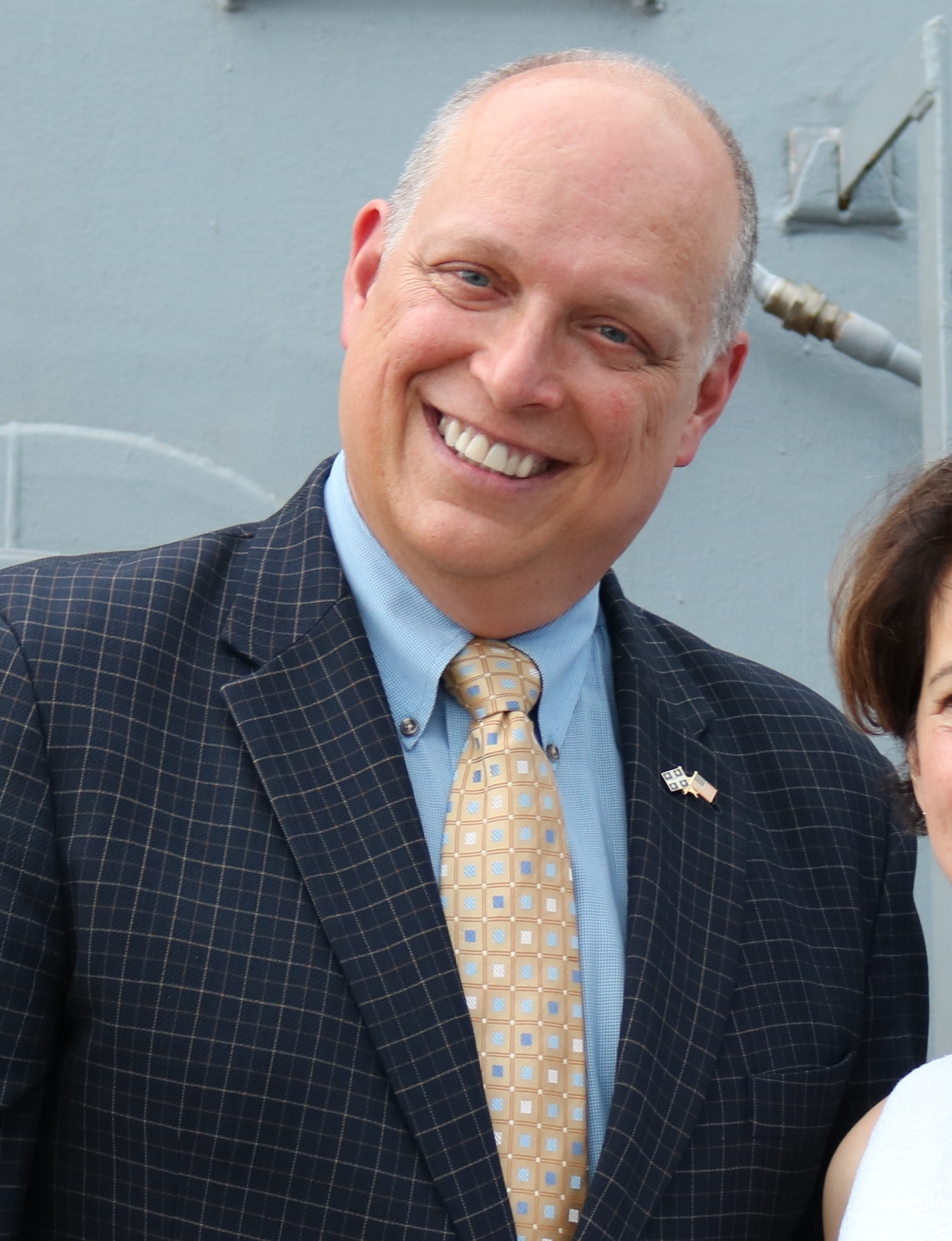

Member of the Canadian Parliament for Montarville
- In office October 21, 2019 – March 23, 2025
- Preceded by: Michel Picard
- Succeeded by: Bienvenu-Olivier Ntumba

Member of the National Assembly of Quebec for Verchères
- In office December 12, 2005 – August 29, 2018
- Preceded by: Bernard Landry
- Succeeded by: Suzanne Dansereau

Member of the Canadian Parliament for Verchères—Les Patriotes
- In office November 27, 2000 – November 9, 2005
- Succeeded by: Luc Malo

Member of the Canadian Parliament for Verchères
- In office October 25, 1993 – November 27, 2000
- Preceded by: Marcel Danis
- Succeeded by: riding redistributed

Personal details
- Born: January 28, 1965 (age 61) Montreal, Quebec
- Party: Bloc Québécois; Parti Québécois
- Spouse: Johanne Dulude

Stéphane Bergeron (born January 28, 1965, in Montreal, Quebec) is a Canadian politician. He served as a Bloc Québécois member of the House of Commons of Canada from 2019 to 2025 and previously served in that office from 1993 to 2005. He served as a Parti Québécois member of the National Assembly of Quebec from 2005 to 2018. He did not seek re-election in 2025.

== Education and early career ==
Bergeron has a bachelor's degree in political science from the Université du Québec à Montréal and a master's degree in the same domain from the Université Laval. Bergeron has been a political adviser and a teaching assistant at Laval in the department of political science. Bergeron also served in the Canadian Forces as a naval Cadet Instructor Cadre officer from 1984 to 1993.

== Political career ==
Bergeron was a member of the Bloc Québécois in the House of Commons, representing the riding of Verchères—Les Patriotes from 2000 to November 9, 2005, and Verchères from 1993 to 2000. Bergeron held many positions as a Member of Parliament including whip of the Bloc and critic of Parliamentary Affairs, Intergovernmental Affairs, Privy Council, Foreign Affairs, Industry, Science, Research, and Development, International Trade and Asia-Pacific.

He resigned his federal seat and won a provincial by-election on December 12, 2005, under the Parti Québécois (PQ) banner. He became the member for Verchères of the Quebec National Assembly succeeding former Quebec Premier Bernard Landry in that riding. He was re-elected in the 2007 provincial election. He was named the PQ's critic in parks and environment but was later promoted to the portfolios of families and seniors.

From 2021 to 2025 he served as the critic of foreign affairs and international development, international cooperation, Canada-China relations in the Bloc Québécois Shadow Cabinet.

As of the 2021 election, Bergeron lived in Varennes, Quebec.

== Electoral record ==
=== Federal ===
2021 Canadian federal election: Montarville
Party	Candidate	Votes	%	±%	Expenditures
Bloc Québécois	Stéphane Bergeron	26,011	45.3	+2.5	$26,513.08
Liberal	Marie-Ève Pelchat	19,974	34.8	-0.8	$56,659.78
Conservative	Julie Sauvageau	5,460	9.5	+2.5	$4,343.53
New Democratic	Djaouida Sellah	4,809	8.4	±0.0	$596.30
People's	Natasha Hynes	1,218	2.1	+1.3	$1,269.78
Total valid votes/expense limit		57,472	98.2	–	$110,040.39
Total rejected ballots		1,033	1.8		
Turnout		58,505	74.7		
Eligible voters		78,273			
Bloc Québécois hold		Swing		+1.7	
Source: Elections Canada

2019 Canadian federal election: Montarville
Party	Candidate	Votes	%	±%	Expenditures
Bloc Québécois	Stéphane Bergeron	25,366	42.8	+14.38	$22,609.89
Liberal	Michel Picard	21,061	35.6	+3.06	$55,495.41
New Democratic	Djaouida Sellah	4,984	8.4	-16.28	$1,715.58
Conservative	Julie Sauvageau	4,138	7.0	-3.85	$11,784.17
Green	Jean-Charles Pelland	2,967	5.0	+2.6	$3,869.64
People's	Julie Lavallée	501	0.8	–	none listed
Rhinoceros	Thomas Thibault-Vincent	211	0.4	–	$0.00
Total valid votes/expense limit		59,228	100		
Total rejected ballots		742			
Turnout		59,970	77.8%		
Eligible voters		77,097			
Bloc Québécois gain from Liberal		Swing		+5.66	
Source: Elections Canada

2000 Canadian federal election: Verchères—Les Patriotes
Party	Candidate	Votes	%	±%	Expenditures
Bloc Québécois	Stéphane Bergeron	28,696	52.29		$61,780
Liberal	Mark Provencher	16,740	30.50	–	$37,677
Progressive Conservative	Frédéric Grenier	3,859	7.03		$2,703
Alliance	Stéphane Désilets	2,870	5.23		$336
Marijuana	Jonathan Bérubé	1,643	2.99		none listed
New Democratic	Charles Bussières	1,074	1.96		$980
Total valid votes		54,882	100.00		
Total rejected ballots		1,673			
Turnout		56,555	69.13		
Electors on the lists		81,810			
Sources: Official Results, Elections Canada and Financial Returns, Elections Canada.

=== Provincial ===
2014 Quebec general election
Party	Candidate	Votes	%	±%
Parti Québécois	Stéphane Bergeron	18,467	42.59	-4.68
Coalition Avenir Québec	Yves Renaud	13,160	30.35	-1.12
Liberal	Simon Rocheleau	8,213	18.94	+5.18
Québec solidaire	Céline Jarrousse	3,074	7.09	+3.02
Option nationale	Mathieu Coulombe	450	1.04	-1.18
Total valid votes		43,364	98.08	
Total rejected ballots		850	1.92	
Turnout		44,214	76.96	
Electors on the lists		57,448		
Liberal hold		Swing		-1.78

2014 results reference:

2012 Quebec general election
Party	Candidate	Votes	%	±%
Parti Québécois	Stéphane Bergeron	22,052	47.27	-8.15
Coalition Avenir Québec	Chantal Soucy	14,682	31.47	+15.98
Liberal	Maxime St-Onge	6,419	13.76	-9.11
Québec solidaire	Marie-Thérèse Toutant	1,900	4.07	+1.42
Option nationale	Diane Massicotte	1,035	2.22	–
Independent	Steven Terranova	297	0.64	–
CC	Mario Geoffrion	269	0.58	–
Total valid votes		46,654	98.71	
Total rejected ballots		608	1.29	
Turnout		47,262	84.14	
Electors on the lists		56,169		
Liberal hold		Swing		-12.06

* Coalition Avenir Québec change is from the Action démocratique.

2012 results reference:

2008 Quebec general election
Party	Candidate	Votes	%	±%
Parti Québécois	Stéphane Bergeron	15,664	55.42	+14.17
Liberal	Vincent Sabourin	6,464	22.87	+8.68
Action démocratique	Daniel Castonguay	4,377	15.49	-21.83
Green	Christine Hayes	845	2.99	-1.21
Québec solidaire	Lynda Gadoury	749	2.65	-0.40
Parti indépendantiste	Yvon Sylva Aubé	164	0.58	–

2007 Quebec general election
Party	Candidate	Votes	%	±%
Parti Québécois	Stéphane Bergeron	13,811	41.25	-27.95
Action démocratique	Luc Robitaille	12,495	37.32	+27.20
Liberal	Paul Verret	4,751	14.19	-3.45
Green	Geneviève Ménard	1,407	4.20	-
Québec solidaire	Michelle Hudon-David	1,020	3.05	+0.01*

Verchères by-election, December 12, 2005
Party	Candidate	Votes	%	±%
Parti Québécois	Stéphane Bergeron	13,118	69.20	+14.42
Liberal	Jean Robert	3,344	17.64	-10.52
Action démocratique	Denise Graveline	1,919	10.12	-4.69
UFP	Jean-François Lessard	576	3.04	+2.41

Political offices
Preceded by Robert Dutil	Minister of Public Security; 2012–2014	Succeeded by Lise Thériault
