= Verchères—Les Patriotes =

Former federal electoral district in Quebec, Canada

Coordinates: 45.69°N 73.39°W

Quebec electoral district
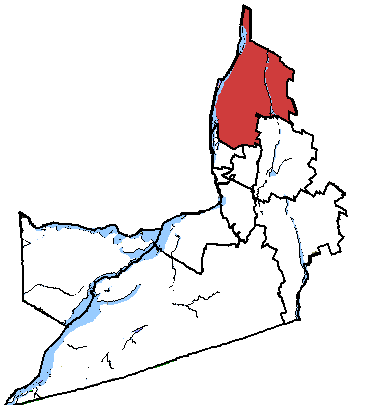
- Verchères—Les Patriotes in relation to other Montérégie federal electoral districts

Defunct federal electoral district
- Legislature: House of Commons
- District created: 1976
- District abolished: 2013
- First contested: 1979
- Last contested: 2011
- District webpage: profile, map

Demographics
- Population (2011): 104,355
- Electors (2011): 76,596
- Area (km²): 659.70
- Census division(s): Longueuil, Marguerite-D'Youville, La Vallée-du-Richelieu
- Census subdivision(s): Boucherville, Sainte-Julie, Varennes, Saint-Amable, Contrecœur, Verchères, Saint-Denis-sur-Richelieu

Verchères—Les Patriotes (French pronunciation: [vɛʁʃɛʁ le patʁijɔt]; formerly Verchères) was a federal electoral district in Quebec, Canada, that was represented in the House of Commons of Canada from 1979 until the 2012 electoral redistribution.

== Geography ==
The riding runs along the Saint Lawrence River east of Montreal, in the Quebec region of Montérégie. It consists of the Marguerite-D'Youville Regional County Municipality, the northern part of the La Vallée-du-Richelieu Regional County Municipality, and the eastern part of the city of Boucherville.

The neighbouring ridings are Bas-Richelieu—Nicolet—Bécancour, Saint-Hyacinthe—Bagot, Chambly—Borduas, Saint-Bruno—Saint-Hubert, Longueuil—Pierre-Boucher, La Pointe-de-l'Île, Repentigny and Berthier—Maskinongé.

== History ==
Verchères riding was created by the British North America Act 1867. In 1893, it was merged into Chambly—Verchères.

In 1976, the riding of "Verchères" was recreated from parts of Chambly and St. Hyacinthe ridings. In 1998, it was renamed "Verchères—Les Patriotes".

The district seat was vacant starting from November 9, 2005, when Stéphane Bergeron stepped down to join provincial politics. No by-election was called before the 2006 election was called for January 23, 2006; Bloc candidate Luc Malo won that election.

This riding was redistributed into the new ridings of Pierre-Boucher—Les Patriotes—Verchères and Montarville in the 2012 electoral redistribution.

=== Members of Parliament ===
This riding has elected the following members of Parliament:

Parliament	Years	Member	Party
Verchères; Riding created from Chambly and St. Hyacinthe
31st	1979–1980	Bernard Loiselle	Liberal
32nd	1980–1984	Bernard Loiselle	Liberal
33rd	1984–1988	Marcel Danis	Progressive Conservative
34th	1988–1993	Marcel Danis	Progressive Conservative
35th	1993–1997	Stéphane Bergeron	Bloc Québécois
36th	1997–2000	Stéphane Bergeron	Bloc Québécois
Verchères—Les Patriotes
37th	2000–2004	Stéphane Bergeron	Bloc Québécois
38th	2004–2005	Stéphane Bergeron	Bloc Québécois
39th	2006–2008	Luc Malo	Bloc Québécois
40th	2008–2011	Luc Malo	Bloc Québécois
41st	2011–2014	Sana Hassainia	New Democratic
41st	2014–2015	Sana Hassainia	Independent
Riding dissolved into Pierre-Boucher—Les Patriotes—Verchères and Montarville

== Election results ==
Party	2011	2008	2006	2004	2000	1997	1993	1988	1984
Bloc Québécois	Luc Malo; 20,593	Luc Malo; 27,602	Luc Malo; 30,250	Stéphane Bergeron; 33,333	Stéphane Bergeron; 28,696	Stéphane Bergeron; 30,074	Stéphane Bergeron; 38,536		
Liberal	Pier-Luc Therrien-Peloquin; 5,352	François Fournier; 8,871	Alanna Woods; 4,602	Nathalie Tousignant; 9,958	Mark Provencher; 16,740	Pierre Patenaude; 12,715	Benoît Chiquette; 12,138	Maurice Lemoine; 8,487	Bernard Pierre Loiselle; 19,365
Conservative	Rodrigo Alfaro; 4,884	Benoît Dussault; 7,742	Jean-Félix Racicot; 11,479	Francis Pierre Rémillard; 2,750					
Progressive Conservative					Frédéric Grenier; 3,859	Jean Legault; 12,428	François Leduc; 5,221	Marcel Danis; 32,317	Marcel Danis; 38,690
Alliance					Stéphane Désilets; 2,870				
New Democratic Party	Sana Hassainia; 24,514	Raphaël Fortin; 8,388	Simon Vallée; 4,293	Simon Vallée; 1,815	Charles Bussières; 1,074	Yas Etessam; 750	Frances Elbourne; 695	Maria Jean; 6,772	James Taylor Christie; 6,534
Green	Thomas Lapierre; 1,259	Annie Morel; 1,679	Carl Danis; 2,047	Philippe Morlighem; 975					
Marijuana				Sébastien Drouin; 463	Jonathan Bérubé; 1,643				
Christian Heritage							Jean Blaquière; 476		
Commonwealth of Canada							Nicholas Maris; 179	Roland Coté; 95	Michel A. Lemire; 109
Rhinoceros							Michel Ben 97 Benoit; 1,260	Miko Maillot; 2,216	
Parti Nationaliste									Michel Lepage; 2,153

=== Verchères—Les Patriotes, 2004–2015 ===
2011 Canadian federal election
Party	Candidate	Votes	%	±%	Expenditures
New Democratic	Sana Hassainia	24,514	43.31	+27.86	
Bloc Québécois	Luc Malo	20,593	36.38	-14.46	
Liberal	Pier-Luc Therrien-Péloquin	5,352	9.46	-6.88	
Conservative	Rodrigo Alfaro	4,884	8.63	-5.63	
Green	Thomas Lapierre	1,259	2.22	-0.87	
Total valid votes/expense limit		56,602	100.00		
Total rejected ballots		871	1.52	+0.13	
Turnout		57,473	71.56	-0.31	
Eligible voters		80,312	–	–	

2008 Canadian federal election
Party	Candidate	Votes	%	±%	Expenditures
Bloc Québécois	Luc Malo	27,602	50.84	-6.59	$39,478
Liberal	François Fournier	8,871	16.34	+7.61	$6,204
New Democratic	Raphaël Fortin	8,388	15.45	+7.30	$7,738
Conservative	Benoît Dussault	7,742	14.26	-7.53	$32,535
Green	Annie Morel	1,679	3.09	-0.79	
Total valid votes/expense limit		54,282	100.00	$82,267	
Total rejected ballots		766	1.39	0.00	
Turnout		55,048	71.87	-0.26	

2006 Canadian federal election
Party	Candidate	Votes	%	±%	Expenditures
Bloc Québécois	Luc Malo	30,250	57.43	-10.2	$40,572
Conservative	Jean-Félix Racicot	11,479	21.79	+16.2	$14,292
Liberal	Alanna Woods	4,602	8.73	-11.5	$5,938
New Democratic	Simon Vallée	4,293	8.15	+4.5	$1,306
Green	Carl Danis	2,047	3.88	+2.9	
Total valid votes/expense limit		52,671	100.00	$76,664	
Total rejected ballots		743	1.39		
Turnout		53,414	72.13		

2004 Canadian federal election
Party	Candidate	Votes	%	±%	Expenditures
Bloc Québécois	Stéphane Bergeron	33,333	67.6	+15.3	$56,029
Liberal	Nathalie Tousignant	9,958	20.2	-10.3	$55,406
Conservative	Francis Pierre Rémillard	2,750	5.6	-6.7	$6,189
New Democratic	Simon Vallée	1,815	3.7	+1.7	$754
Green	Philippe Morlighem	975	2.0	–	$0
Marijuana	Sébastien Drouin	463	0.9	-2.1	
Total valid votes/expense limit		49,294	100.0	$74,238	

Note: Conservative vote is compared to the total of the Canadian Alliance vote and Progressive Conservative vote in 2000 election.

2000 Canadian federal election
Party	Candidate	Votes	%	±%
Bloc Québécois	Stéphane Bergeron	28,696	52.3	-1.4
Liberal	Mark Provencher	16,740	30.5	+7.8
Progressive Conservative	Frédéric Grenier	3,859	7.0	-15.2
Alliance	Stéphane Désilets	2,870	5.2	
Marijuana	Jonathan Bérubé	1,643	3.0	
New Democratic	Charles Bussières	1,074	2.0	+0.6
Total valid votes		54,882	100.0	

=== Verchères, 1979-2000 ===
1997 Canadian federal election
Party	Candidate	Votes	%	±%
Bloc Québécois	Stéphane Bergeron	30,074	53.7	-14.1
Liberal	Pierre Patenaude	12,715	22.7	+1.4
Progressive Conservative	Jean Legault	12,428	22.2	+13.0
New Democratic	Yas Etessam	750	1.3	+0.1
Total valid votes		55,967	100.0	

1993 Canadian federal election
Party	Candidate	Votes	%	±%
Bloc Québécois	Stéphane Bergeron	38,536	67.8	
Liberal	Benoît Chiquette	12,138	21.4	+4.0
Progressive Conservative	François Leduc	5,221	9.2	-56.9
New Democratic	Frances Elbourne	695	1.2	-12.6
Christian Heritage	Jean Blaquière	47	0.1	
Commonwealth of Canada	Nicholas Maris	179	0.3	+0.1
Total valid votes		56,816	100.0	

1988 Canadian federal election
Party	Candidate	Votes	%	±%
Progressive Conservative	Marcel Danis	32,317	66.0	+10.0
Liberal	Maurice Lemoine	8,487	17.3	-10.7
New Democratic	Maria Jean	6,772	13.8	+4.4
Rhinoceros	Michel Ben 97 Benoit	1,260	2.6	-0.6
Commonwealth of Canada	Roland Coté	95	0.2	–
Total valid votes		48,931	100.0	

1984 Canadian federal election
Party	Candidate	Votes	%	±%
Progressive Conservative	Marcel Danis	38,690	56.0	+45.7
Liberal	Bernard Loiselle	19,365	28.0	-40.1
New Democratic	James Christie	6,534	9.5	-3.3
Rhinoceros	Miko Maillot	2,216	3.2	-1.9
Parti nationaliste	Michel Lepage	2,153	3.1	
Commonwealth of Canada	Michel A. Lemire	101	0.1	
Total valid votes		69,059	100.0	

1980 Canadian federal election
Party	Candidate	Votes	%	±%
Liberal	Bernard Loiselle	37,393	68.1	+5.3
New Democratic	Chislaine Gagnon	7,015	12.8	+6.5
Progressive Conservative	Armand Lefebvre	5,653	10.3	-3.7
Rhinoceros	Hugue Le Brulôt Mignault	2,804	5.1	+1.7
Social Credit	Benoît Houle	1,514	2.8	-10.1
Union populaire	Madeleine Gamache	410	0.7	0.3
Marxist–Leninist	Christiane Robidoux	88	0.2	0.0
Total valid votes		54,877	100.0	

1979 Canadian federal election
Party	Candidate	Votes	%
Liberal	Bernard Loiselle	36,542	62.8
Progressive Conservative	Armand Lefebvre	8,156	14.0
Social Credit	André Campeau	7,460	12.8
New Democratic	Micheline Ruelland	3,652	6.3
Rhinoceros	Damien Tremblay	1,960	3.4
Union populaire	Gilles Maillé	287	0.5
Marxist–Leninist	Christiane Robidoux	114	0.2
Total valid votes		58,171	100.0

== See also ==
- List of Canadian electoral districts
- Historical federal electoral districts of Canada
