= Amable Jodoin =

Canadian politician (1828–1880)

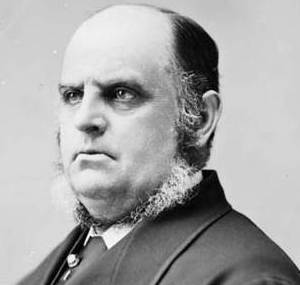
Amable Jodoin Source: Library and Archives Canada

Amable Jodoin (May 31, 1828 – January 8, 1880) was a Canadian businessman and political figure in Quebec. He represented Chambly in the House of Commons of Canada from 1874 to 1875 as a Liberal member.

He was born in Boucherville, Lower Canada, the son of Amable Jodoin and Esther Weilbrenner. Jodoin served as a member of Montreal city council. He married Marie-Hélène Jodoin in 1853. Jodoin was a director of the Metropolitan Bank. In 1870, he purchased a foundry in Longueuil. The Jodoins also purchased several properties in the Old Montreal area. His election to the House of Commons in 1874 was overturned; he won the by-election which followed in 1875 but that election was again appealed; Pierre Basile Benoit won the by-election held in 1876. Jodoin died four years later at the age of 51 in Beloeil, Quebec.
