= Aimé Langlois =

Canadian politician (1880–1954)

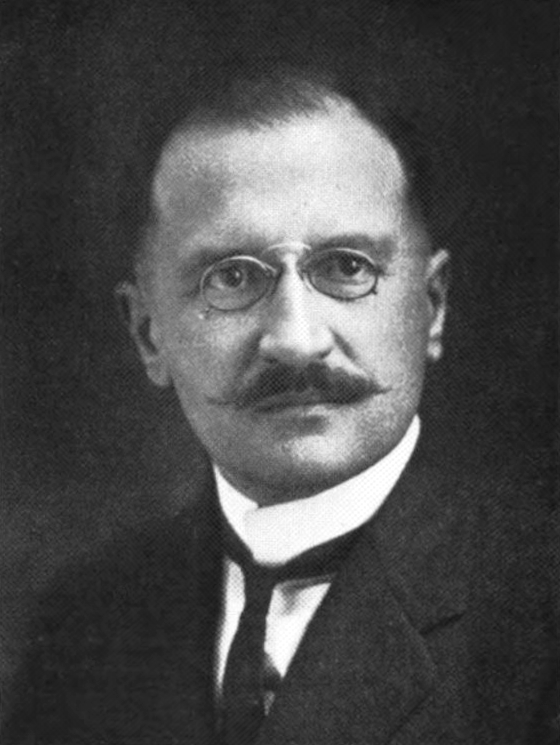

Member of Parliament for Chambly—Verchères
- In office October 1925 – May 1930
- Preceded by: Joseph Archambault
- Succeeded by: Alfred Duranleau

Personal details
- Born: Joseph-Victor-Aimé Langlois; 6 December 1880 Varennes, Quebec
- Died: 24 March 1954 (aged 73)
- Party: Liberal
- Spouse(s): Regina Massue m. 22 May 1905
- Profession: Notary

Joseph-Victor-Aimé Langlois (French pronunciation: [ʒozɛf viktɔʁ ɛme lɑ̃ɡlwa]; 6 December 1880 – 24 March 1954) was a Canadian lawyer and politician. Langlois was a Liberal party member of the House of Commons of Canada.

Langlois was born in Varennes, Quebec. From 1904, Langlois served as secretary-treasurer of Varennes. From 1918 to 1925, he managed his community's branch of the Provincial Bank of Canada. He married Regina Massue, a granddaughter of House of Commons member Louis Huet Massue of the Richelieu riding.

He was first elected to Parliament at the Chambly—Verchères riding in the 1925 general election and re-elected there in 1926. After completing his second term, the 16th Canadian Parliament, Langlois left federal politics and did not seek re-election in the 1930 vote.
