= Maurice Johnson (Canadian politician) =

Canadian politician (1929–2020)

Member of Parliament for Chambly—Rouville
- In office March 1958 – June 1962
- Preceded by: Yvon L'Heureux
- Succeeded by: Bernard Pilon

Personal details
- Born: Paul Léo Maurice Johnson; 17 January 1929
- Died: 24 January 2020 (aged 91)
- Party: Progressive Conservative
- Profession: lawyer

Paul Léo Maurice Johnson (17 January 1929 – 24 January 2020) was a Canadian politician who was Progressive Conservative party member of the House of Commons of Canada. He was a lawyer by career.

Maurice Johnson was first elected at the Chambly—Rouville riding in the 1958 general election and was a government member in John Diefenbaker's administration. He was defeated after one term of office by Bernard Pilon of the Liberal party in the 1962 election.

Johnson voted against his government on a measure which limited capital punishment to cases of intentional or premeditated murder. Previously, the death penalty could apply to all forms of murder convictions. These revisions to the Criminal Code concerned Johnson who felt that this decision would lead to elimination of the death penalty.

Maurice Johnson died on 24 January 2020, at the age of 91. He was a brother of former Quebec premier Daniel Johnson, Sr.
