= Joseph Archambault =

Canadian politician and lawyer

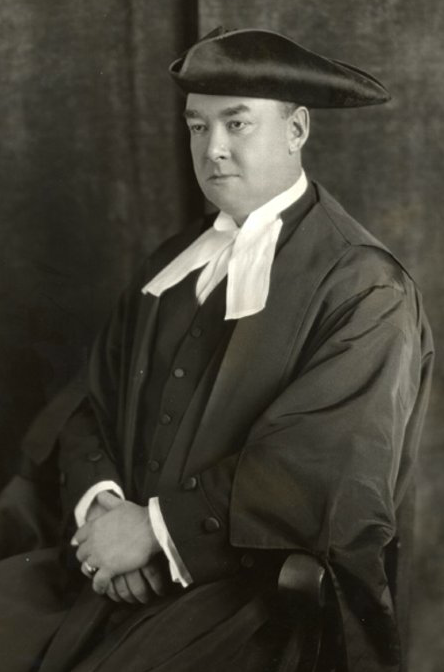

Member of the Canadian Parliament for Chambly—Verchères
- In office 1917–1925
- Preceded by: Joseph Hormisdas Rainville
- Succeeded by: Aimé Langlois

Personal details
- Born: February 17, 1879 Montreal, Quebec, Canada
- Died: September 11, 1964 (aged 85)
- Party: Liberal
- Profession: lawyer

Joseph Archambault (February 17, 1879 – September 11, 1964) was a Canadian politician and lawyer.

Archambault was born in Montreal, Quebec, Canada. He was elected as a Member of the Liberal Party to the House of Commons of Canada in the 1917 election to represent the riding of Chambly—Verchères. He joined the anti-conscription Laurier Liberals on March 18, 1918 and was re-elected in the 1921 election.

He was chair of the Royal Commission to Investigate the Penal System of Canada, whose inquiry ran from 1936 to 1938. Its 1938 report, informally called the Archambault Report, made influential recommendations for prison reform in Canadian penitentiaries.
