= Jean-François Mercier =

Comedian, screenwriter and television host from Montreal, Quebec, Canada

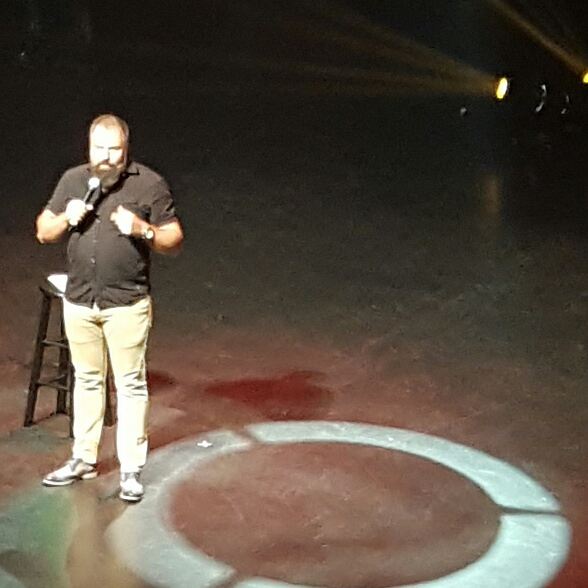
Jean-François Mercier in 2017

Jean-François Mercier (born 19 July 1967) is a comedian, screenwriter and television host from Montreal, Quebec, Canada. Mercier's comedy features his scruffy appearance and mixes social criticism with vulgarity, curse words and expressions of anger.

Self-nicknamed Le Gros Cave (French for fat dumbass) he gained recognition through TV show appearances in The Mike Ward Show in the early 2000s, where he played a recurring character known as 'The Frustrated Guy'. Mercier later had his own one-man show, appeared several times at Montreal's French comedy festival Just For Laughs and was one of the screenwriters of TV show Les Bougon. Starting in 2010, he hosted his late-night talk show Un gars le soir (One guy at night) at V. In the late 1990s, he was hired as an actor in the short-lived tabloid talk show Black out, where he appeared as a common man in the audience trying to spark controversy.

In 2011, Mercier stood as an independent candidate in the Canadian federal election in the riding of Chambly—Borduas. One of his electoral promises was to add a second Mercier bridge, since he and the bridge shared the same surname. In a 24 April 2011 Journal de Montréal poll, 15% of the voters of the Chambly-Borduas riding had the intention to vote for Mercier, polling higher than the Liberal and Conservative candidates. The Bloc Québécois MP Yves Lessard denounced Mercier's campaign as "a sad use of democracy". Mercier finished third with 11% of the vote, beating both the Liberal and Conservative candidates, though losing to NDP's Matthew Dubé.
