= Sana Hassainia =

Canadian politician (born 1974)

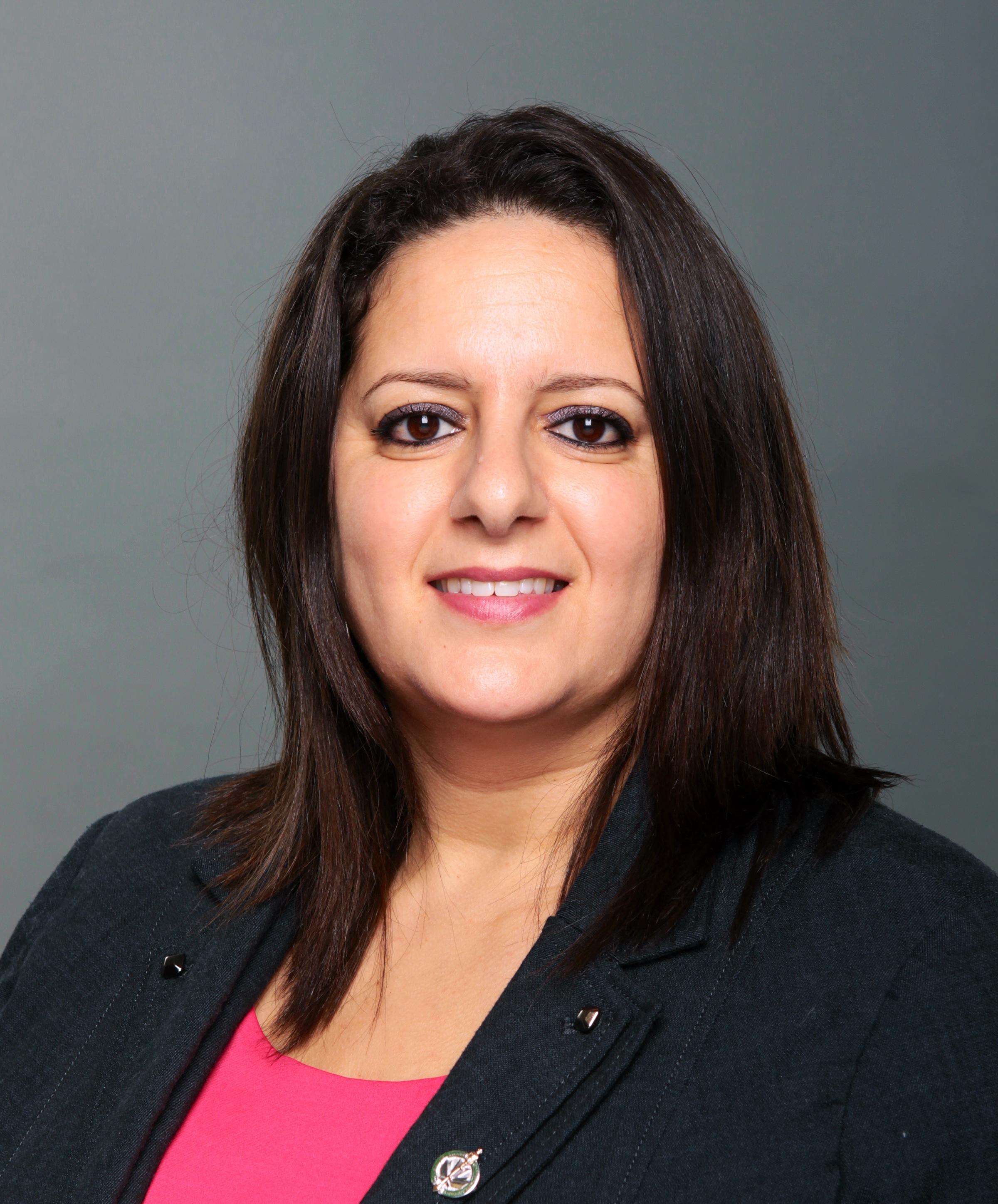

Member of Parliament for Verchères—Les Patriotes
- In office May 2, 2011 – August 4, 2015
- Preceded by: Luc Malo
- Succeeded by: riding dissolved

Personal details
- Born: November 1, 1974 (age 51) Tunis, Tunisia
- Party: Independent
- Other political affiliations: New Democratic Party (2011-2014)
- Spouse: Amine Kochlef
- Education: Université de Montréal

Sana Hassainia (Arabic: سانا هاسينيا; born November 1, 1974) is a Tunisian born Canadian politician. She was elected to the House of Commons of Canada in the 2011 election as the New Democratic Member of Parliament for Verchères—Les Patriotes. She left the NDP caucus on August 20, 2014 as the result of a dispute with NDP leader Thomas Mulcair's position on the Israeli–Palestinian conflict and completed her term as an independent MP.

== Education ==
She has degrees in French literature and language, and a journalism certificate from the Université de Montréal. At the time of her election she was working in the printing business.

== Personal life ==
While an MP, Hassainia gave birth to her son, Skander-Jack Kochlef, on 14 November 2011. Her second child was born in 2013.

== Split with NDP ==
On August 20, 2014, Hassainia announced she was leaving the NDP and will sit as an independent due to Mulcair's "excessively pro-Israel stance on the current conflict in Gaza and demeaning party demands to toe the line." Hassainia claimed that she was "punished" for supporting Brian Topp (who previously challenged Mulcair for the party's leaderships) by being removed from her position with Commons committee on the Status of Women. Regarding the Middle East, Hassainia stated that she could not support the position adopted by the NDP under Mulcair." Following her announcement, Hassainia stated that "a party leader should be loved like [former leader] Jack Layton and not feared. Today, I have the courage to make a significant gesture, to take a weight off my shoulders and stand by my convictions."

In her blog, Hassainia blamed "pressures within and outside the party" for the shift in the NDP's position towards the Middle East, and stated that "To declare that we are in favour of peace in the Middle East is not a position, in fact it's a non-position — it's a way to avoid the issue and postpone a discussion on a topic that 'angers.'"

However, according to the Canadian Press, sources within the NDP subsequently claimed that Hassainia had never expressed concerns with the party's position towards the Israel/Palestine conflict prior to her announcement and accused her of "simply looking for an excuse to cover the fact that she rarely shows up for work." The National Post noted that Hassainia participated in only 8.7% of votes in the House of Commons for the first seven months of 2014, which meant that she had the lowest attendance record of any MP during this period. Another source claimed that the NDP "bent over backwards" to accommodate Hassainia's schedule, but that Nycole Turmel (the NDP party whip) became "frustrated in her efforts to get Hassainia to show up for votes and perform other parliamentary duties."

In response to Hassainia's announcement, Mulcair stated that she had never expressed concern with his position towards Israel. Mulcair stated that the NDP's policy for supporting the Two-State Solution to the Israel/Palestine conflict remains unchanged from when Jack Layton was leader, while adding that "in her note, [Hassainia] made it clear that she doesn't agree with that."

Hassiania was criticized for her poor attendance record in both in the House (in 2014 she attended 16 of 269 votes) and at her constituency office; she defended herself saying that her commitment to her caring for her two young children took her away from the House in early evenings when many votes take place.

On February 5, 2015, she announced that she was not going to be a candidate in the 2015 federal election.

== Electoral record ==
2011 Canadian federal election: Verchères—Les Patriotes
Party	Candidate	Votes	%	±%
New Democratic	Sana Hassainia	24,514	43.31	+27.86
Bloc Québécois	Luc Malo	20,593	36.38	-14.46
Liberal	Pier-Luc Therrien-Péloquin	5,352	9.46	-6.88
Conservative	Rodrigo Alfaro	4,884	8.63	-5.63
Green	Thomas Lapierre	1,259	2.22	-0.87
Total valid votes		56,602	98.48	-0.13
Total rejected ballots		871	1.52	+0.13
Turnout		57,473	71.56	-0.31
Eligible voters		80,312	–	–
