= Luc Malo =

Canadian politician (born 1973)

Member of the Canadian Parliament for Verchères—Les Patriotes
- In office 2006–2011
- Preceded by: Stéphane Bergeron
- Succeeded by: Sana Hassainia

Personal details
- Born: November 2, 1973 (age 52) Contrecoeur, Quebec, Canada
- Party: Bloc Québécois
- Profession: business development consultant

Luc Malo (born November 2, 1973) is a Canadian politician, who was a Member of Parliament for the riding of Verchères—Les Patriotes from 2006 to 2011. He ran as a member of the Bloc Québécois in the 2006 federal election and won with approximately 57% of the vote. As a member of the Bloc Québécois Shadow Cabinet, he was the Bloc's critic for the Minister of Sport.

Malo was born in Contrecoeur, Quebec, and graduated with a Master of Business Administration degree from the Université de Sherbrooke. From 1996 until 2001, he was an attaché and chief of staff for Stéphane Bergeron, the Member of Parliament (MP) for Verchères—Les Patriotes, then called Verchères. In 2003 and 2004, he continued to serve as an attaché, becoming a research associate for the riding's Member of Parliament in 2005. He presently works as an advisor and business development consultant.

Malo has stated that Hockey Canada never should have hired hockey player Shane Doan because of an alleged slur he made toward French Canadians.

== Electoral record (partial) ==
2008 Canadian federal election: Verchères—Les Patriotes
Party	Candidate	Votes	%	±%	Expenditures
Bloc Québécois	Luc Malo	27,602	50.85		$39,334
Liberal	François Fournier	8,871	16.34	–	$6,121
New Democratic	Raphaël Fortin	8,388	15.45		$7,738
Conservative	Benoît Dussault	7,742	14.26		$32,120
Green	Annie Morel	1,679	3.09	–	none listed
Total valid votes		54,282	100.00		
Total rejected ballots		766			
Turnout		55,048	71.87		
Electors on the lists		76,596			
Sources: Official Results, Elections Canada and Financial Returns, Elections Canada.
