= Victor Geoffrion =

Canadian politician

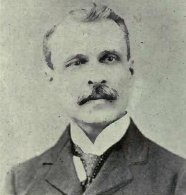

Member of the Canadian Parliament for Chambly—Verchères
- In office 1900–1911
- Preceded by: Christophe-Alphonse Geoffrion
- Succeeded by: Joseph Hormisdas Rainville

Personal details
- Born: October 23, 1851 St-Simon de Bagot, Canada East
- Died: May 31, 1923 (aged 71) Montreal, Quebec, Canada
- Party: Liberal
- Relations: Félix Geoffrion & Christophe-Alphonse Geoffrion, brothers

Victor Geoffrion (October 23, 1851 – May 31, 1923) was a Canadian politician.

Born in St-Simon de Bagot, Canada East, the brother of Félix Geoffrion and Christophe-Alphonse Geoffrion, both MPs, Geoffrion was educated at the St. Hyacinthe Seminary and McGill University. A lawyer, he was a partner in the law firm of Geoffrion, Geoffrion, & Cusson in Montreal. He was first elected to the House of Commons of Canada for the electoral district of Chambly—Verchères in a 1900 by-election and was re-elected in 1900, 1904, and 1908. A Liberal, he was defeated in 1911. He died in his law office.
