= Bernard Pilon =

Canadian politician

J.-E. Bernard Pilon
- Official 1968 portrait

Member of the Canadian Parliament for Chambly—Rouville
- In office June 1962 – June 1968
- Preceded by: Maurice Johnson
- Succeeded by: District was abolished in 1966

Member of the Canadian Parliament for Chambly
- In office June 1968 – November 1970
- Preceded by: District was created in 1966
- Succeeded by: Yvon L'Heureux

Personal details
- Born: 1 August 1918 Vaudreuil, Quebec, Canada
- Died: 17 November 1970 (aged 52) Montreal, Quebec, Canada
- Party: Liberal
- Profession: insurance broker

J.-E. Bernard Pilon (1 August 1918 – 17 November 1970) was a Canadian insurance broker and politician. Pilon served as a Liberal party member of the House of Commons of Canada. He was born in Vaudreuil, Quebec.

He was first elected at the Chambly—Rouville riding in the 1962 general election, then re-elected there in the 1963 and 1965 federal elections. For the 1968 federal election, riding boundaries were realigned and Pilon was a candidate at the Chambly electoral district.

Pilon died in Montreal on 17 November 1970 due to a heart attack before completing his term in the 28th Canadian Parliament.
