= Chambly—Rouville =

Former federal electoral district in Quebec, Canada

Quebec electoral district

Defunct federal electoral district
- Legislature: House of Commons
- District created: 1933
- District abolished: 1966
- First contested: 1935
- Last contested: 1965

Chambly—Rouville was a federal electoral district in Quebec, Canada, that was represented in the House of Commons of Canada from 1935 to 1968.

This riding was created in 1933 from parts of Chambly—Verchères and St. Hyacinthe—Rouville ridings. It was abolished into Chambly and Saint-Hyacinthe in 1966.

== History ==
It initially consisted of:

- the county of Chambly, including the cities of Longueuil and St-Lambert;
- the county of Rouville excepting such part thereof as is included in the municipalities of St-Paul-d'Abbotsford, St-Ange-Gardien, St-Césaire, and the villages of Canrobert and St-Césaire;
- that part of the county of Verchères included in the municipality of the town of Beloeil, the village of McMasterville, and the municipalities of Ste-Julie and St-Mathieu.

In 1947, it was redefined to consist of:

- the county of Chambly (except the municipality of Ste. Famille-de-Boucherville and the village of Boucherville), the cities of Longueuil and St. Lambert and the towns of Greenfield Park and Montreal South;
- the county of Rouville (except that part of the county included in the municipalities of St. Paul-d'Abbotsford, St. Ange-Gardien, St. Césaire and the villages of Canrobert and St. Césaire), and the town of Marieville;
- the town of Beloeil and that part of the county of Verchères included in the village of McMasterville and the municipalities of Ste. Julie and St. Mathieu.

In 1952, it was defined to consist of:

- the county of Chambly, (less the municipality of the parish of Sainte-Famille-de-Boucherville, and the municipality of the village of Boucherville);
- the town of Fort Chambly;
- the county of Rouville, (less the parish municipalities of Saint-Paul-d'Abbotsford, and Saint-Ange-Gardien, the municipality of Saint-Césaire, and the village municipalities of Canrobert and Saint-Césaire);
- the town of Marieville; the town of Beloeil and that part of the county of Verchères included in the village municipality of McMasterville and the parish municipalities of Sainte-Julie and Saint-Mathieu-de-Beloeil.

== Members of Parliament ==
This riding elected the following members of Parliament:

Parliament	Years	Member	Party
Chambly—Rouville; Riding created from Chambly—Verchères and St. Hyacinthe—Rouville
18th	1935–1940	Vincent Dupuis	Liberal
19th	1940–1945	Vincent Dupuis	Liberal
20th	1945–1949	Roch Pinard	Liberal
21st	1949–1953	Roch Pinard	Liberal
22nd	1953–1957	Roch Pinard	Liberal
23rd	1957–1958	Yvon L'Heureux	Liberal
24th	1958–1962	Maurice Johnson	Progressive Conservative
25th	1962–1963	Bernard Pilon	Liberal
26th	1963–1965	Bernard Pilon	Liberal
27th	1965–1968	Bernard Pilon	Liberal
Riding dissolved into Chambly and Saint-Hyacinthe

== Election results ==
1935 Canadian federal election
Party	Candidate	Votes
Liberal	Vincent Dupuis	9,555
Conservative	Antoine Lamarre	6,370
Reconstruction	Robert Louis Calder	2,228

1940 Canadian federal election
Party	Candidate	Votes
Liberal	Vincent Dupuis	11,964
National Government	Jean-Joseph Penverne	5,761
Independent Conservative	Joseph Menard	567

1945 Canadian federal election
Party	Candidate	Votes
Liberal	Roch Pinard	12,723
Independent	Paul Pratt	9,158
Bloc populaire	Michel Chartrand	2,333
Co-operative Commonwealth	Joseph-Charles Patenaude	1,041

1949 Canadian federal election
Party	Candidate	Votes
Liberal	Roch Pinard	20,946
Progressive Conservative	Jean-Charles Lefrancois	11,362
Co-operative Commonwealth	Joseph-Charles Patenaude	733
Independent PC	Jean-Marie Fleury	449

1953 Canadian federal election
Party	Candidate	Votes
Liberal	Roch Pinard	9,824
Progressive Conservative	Marcel Landry	5,016

1957 Canadian federal election
Party	Candidate	Votes
Liberal	Yvon L'Heureux	11,302
Progressive Conservative	Marcel Landry	5,858
Independent Liberal	Paul Poirier	1,035
Independent Liberal	Maxime St-Laurent	192

1958 Canadian federal election
Party	Candidate	Votes
Progressive Conservative	Maurice Johnson	10,546
Liberal	Yvon L'Heureux	10,224
Social Credit	Camille Lussier	366

1962 Canadian federal election
Party	Candidate	Votes
Liberal	Bernard Pilon	11,813
Progressive Conservative	Maurice Johnson	9,688
Social Credit	Camille Lussier	3,236

1963 Canadian federal election
Party	Candidate	Votes
Liberal	Bernard Pilon	13,850
Social Credit	Camille Lussier	4,887
Progressive Conservative	Roger-E.-N. Petit	3,412
New Democratic	Bernard Lefebvre	2,311

1965 Canadian federal election
Party	Candidate	Votes
Liberal	Bernard Pilon	14,377
New Democratic	Georges St-Amour	4,266
Progressive Conservative	Dominique Page	3,838
Ralliement créditiste	Paul Verville	1,896

== See also ==
- List of Canadian electoral districts
- Historical federal electoral districts of Canada
