= Joseph Hormisdas Rainville =

Canadian politician (1875–1942)

The Hon. Joseph Hormisdas Rainville
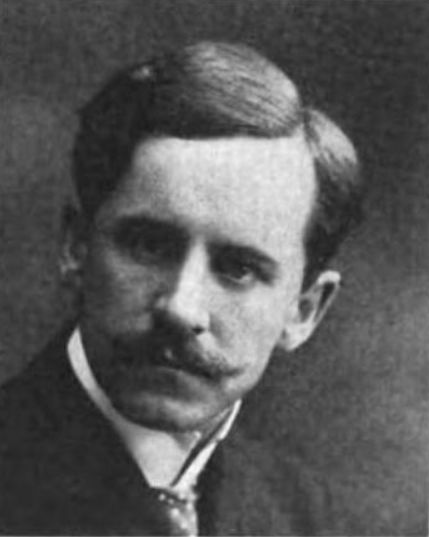

Senator for Repentigny, Quebec
- In office October 6, 1932 – April 14, 1942
- Appointed by: R. B. Bennett
- Preceded by: Joseph-Hormisdas Legris
- Succeeded by: Pamphile Réal Du Tremblay

Member of the Canadian Parliament for Chambly—Verchères
- In office 1911–1917
- Preceded by: Victor Geoffrion
- Succeeded by: Joseph Archambault

Personal details
- Born: March 8, 1875 Marieville, Quebec
- Died: April 14, 1942 (aged 67)
- Party: Conservative
- Relations: Henri-Benjamin Rainville, uncle
- Portfolio: Deputy Speaker and Chair of Committees of the Whole of the House of Commons (1917)

Joseph-Hormisdas Rainville (March 8, 1875 – April 14, 1942) was a lawyer and political figure in Quebec. He represented Chambly—Verchères in the House of Commons of Canada from 1911 to 1917 as a Conservative. Rainville sat for Repentigny division in the Senate of Canada from 1923 to 1942.

He was born in Marieville, Quebec, the son of Isaïe-Denis Rainville and Cornélie Rainville, and was educated at the Université Laval. He was admitted to the bar in 1900 and set up practice in Montreal. Rainville married Ferréola Gendreau in 1910. In 1930, he was named president of the Commission of the Port of Montreal. Rainville died in office at the age of 67.

He was named a Chevalier in the French Légion d'honneur in 1934.

His uncle Henri-Benjamin Rainville served in the Quebec assembly.
