= Matthew Dubé =

Canadian politician

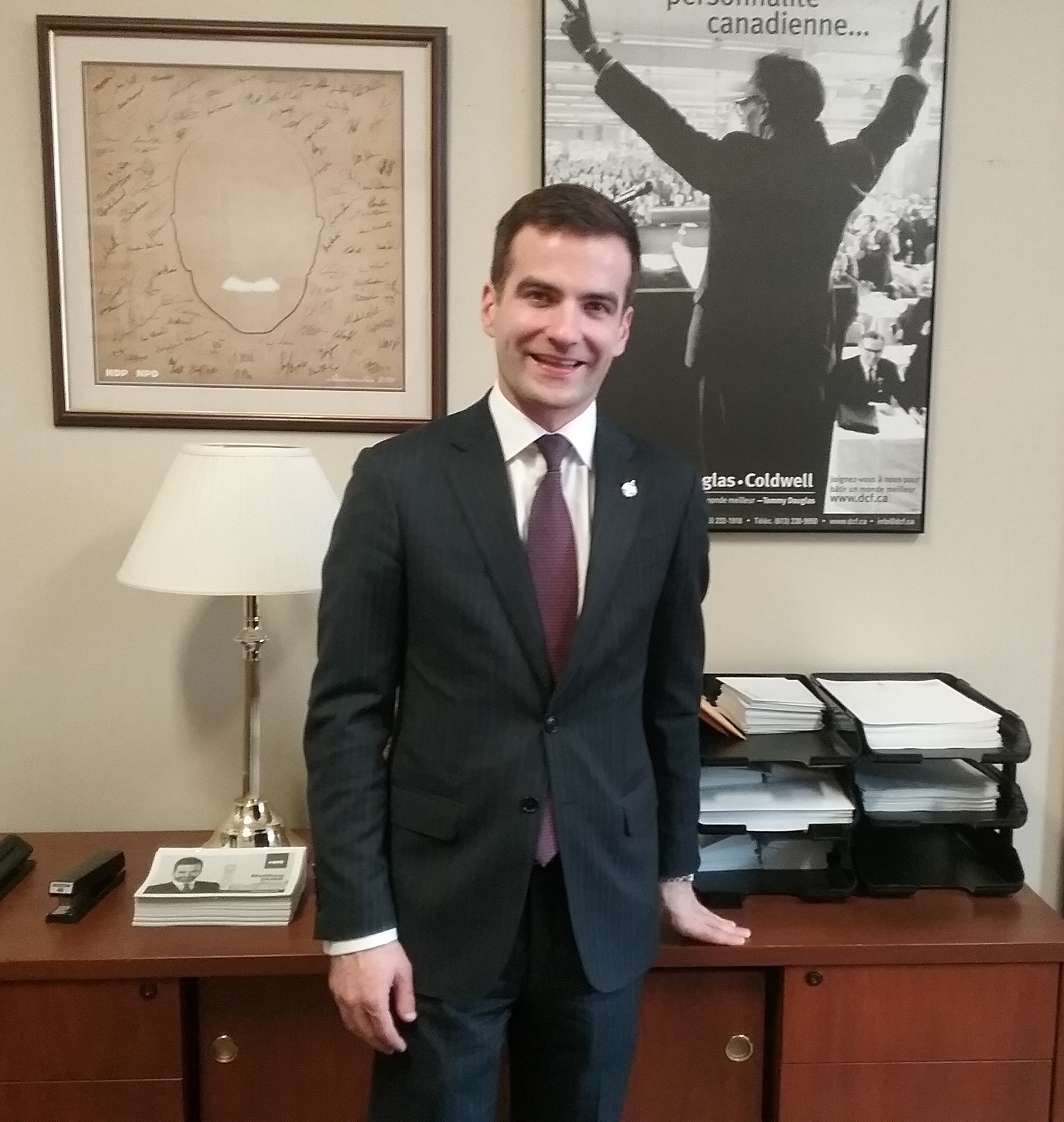
- Dubé in 2018

Member of Parliament for Beloeil—Chambly (Chambly—Borduas; 2011–2015)
- In office May 2, 2011 – October 19, 2019
- Preceded by: Yves Lessard
- Succeeded by: Yves-François Blanchet

Personal details
- Born: May 3, 1988 (age 38) Montreal, Quebec, Canada
- Party: New Democratic
- Spouse: Chantale Neapole
- Profession: Coach, student

Matthew Dubé (born May 3, 1988) is a Canadian politician who was elected to the House of Commons in the 2011 federal election to represent the electoral district of Chambly—Borduas in Quebec as a member of the New Democratic Party. He was re-elected in 2015 to the redistributed riding of Beloeil—Chambly but lost his seat in 2019.

== Biography ==
Born in Montreal, Dubé was elected co-president of NDP McGill in September 2010 and was also elected president of the Quebec Young New Democrats in November 2010. At the time of his election to the House of Commons, he was a McGill University student completing his Bachelor of Arts degree majoring in political science with a minor in history.

He married Chantale Neapole on June 30, 2018.

== Politics ==
Dubé defeated incumbent MP Yves Lessard of the Bloc Québécois by 15.1% or more than 10,000 votes in the 2011 election. Specifically, Dubé received 42.7% of the vote, Lessard received 27.6%, independent candidate Jean-François Mercier received 11.4%, Liberal Party candidate Bernard DeLorme received 8.9%, Conservative Party candidate Nathalie Ferland Drolet received 7.9%, and Green Party candidate Nicholas Lescarbeau received 1.5%.

He was one of five current McGill University students, alongside fellow undergraduates Mylène Freeman, Laurin Liu, and Charmaine Borg, and graduate student Jamie Nicholls, elected to Parliament in the 2011 election following the New Democratic Party's unexpected mid-campaign surge in Quebec.

Borg and Dubé were co-presidents of NDP McGill (the NDP student group at McGill University) at the time that they both won election to Parliament, and both had spent the campaign working to re-elect NDP Quebec lieutenant Tom Mulcair in the nearby riding of Outremont.

At the time of his election, Dubé had coached junior-league soccer and hockey for several years.

Dubé was the only one of the so-called "McGill 5" re-elected in the 2015 election. Mulcair, by this time leader of the NDP, appointed Dubé to be the NDP critic for Infrastructure and Communities and Deputy House Leader in the 42nd Canadian Parliament. Subsequently, under Mulcair's successor, Jagmeet Singh, Dubé went on to become the party’s Public Safety and Emergency Preparedness critic as well as the NDP caucus chair.

He lost his seat to Yves-François Blanchet, leader of the Bloc Québécois, in the 2019 Canadian federal election.

== Electoral record ==
2019 Canadian federal election: Beloeil—Chambly
Party	Candidate	Votes	%	±%	Expenditures
Bloc Québécois	Yves-François Blanchet	35,068	50.5	+22.82	$36,540.34
Liberal	Marie-Chantal Hamel	16,059	23.1	−6.24	$62,823.63
New Democratic	Matthew Dubé	10,086	14.5	−16.57	$20,636.78
Conservative	Véronique Laprise	4,305	6.2	−3.09	$0.00
Green	Pierre Carrier	3,255	4.7	+2.45	$18,235.50
People's	Chloé Bernard	512	0.7	—	$5,931.38
Indépendance du Québec	Michel Blondin	205	0.3	—	$768.82
Total valid votes/expense limit		69,490	100.0		
Total rejected ballots		1,064			
Turnout		70,554	73.7		
Eligible voters		95,723			
Bloc Québécois gain from New Democratic		Swing		+19.79	
Source: Elections Canada

2015 Canadian federal election: Beloeil—Chambly
Party	Candidate	Votes	%	±%	Expenditures
New Democratic	Matthew Dubé	20,641	31.07	-11.53	–
Liberal	Karine Desjardins	19,494	29.34	+20.32	–
Bloc Québécois	Yves Lessard	18,387	27.68	+0.27	–
Conservative	Claude Chalhoub	6,173	9.29	+1.35	–
Green	Fodé Kerfalla Yansané	1,498	2.25	+0.70	–
Libertarian	Michael Maher	245	0.37	–	–
Total valid votes/Expense limit		–	100.00		$231,893.10
Total rejected ballots		950	1.41	–	
Turnout		67,388	74.00	–	
Eligible voters		91,068			
New Democratic hold		Swing		-15.93	
Source: Elections Canada

2011 Canadian federal election: Chambly—Borduas
Party	Candidate	Votes	%	±%	Expenditures
New Democratic	Matthew Dubé	29,591	42.74	+28.56	
Bloc Québécois	Yves Lessard	19,147	27.65	-22.43	
Independent	Jean-François Mercier	7,843	11.33	–	
Liberal	Bernard DeLorme	6,165	8.90	-7.88	
Conservative	Nathalie Ferland Drolet	5,425	7.83	-7.24	
Green	Nicholas Lescarbeau	1,072	1.55	-2.33	
Total valid votes/Expense limit		69,243	100.00		
Rejected ballots		621	0.89	-0.36	
Turnout		69,864	70.62	+2.21	
New Democratic gain from Bloc Québécois		Swing		+25.5	
