= Roch Pinard =

Canadian politician

The Hon. Roch Pinard

Member of the Canadian Parliament for Chambly—Rouville
- In office 1945–1957
- Preceded by: Vincent Dupuis
- Succeeded by: Yvon L'Heureux

Personal details
- Born: July 26, 1910 Nicolet, Quebec
- Died: April 23, 1974 (aged 63)
- Party: Liberal
- Cabinet: Secretary of State of Canada (1954-1957); Postmaster General (Acting) (1955)
- Portfolio: Parliamentary Assistant to the Secretary of State for External Affairs (1953-1954)

Roch Pinard, PC (July 26, 1910 – April 23, 1974) was a Canadian politician.

Born in Nicolet, Quebec, he was a lawyer before being elected to the House of Commons of Canada in Quebec the riding of Chambly—Rouville in 1945 federal election. A Liberal, he was re-elected in the 1949 election and the 1953 election. From 1954 to 1957, he was the Secretary of State of Canada and in 1955 he was the Postmaster General (Acting).

Pinard was one of Canada's delegates to the Tenth session of the United Nations General Assembly, 1955–1956.
