= Christophe-Alphonse Geoffrion =

Canadian politician

The Honourable Christophe-Alphonse Geoffrion PC
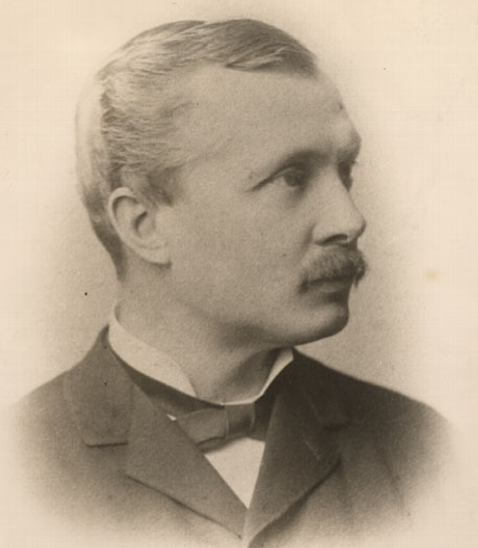

Member of the Canadian Parliament for Verchères
- In office 1895–1896
- Preceded by: Félix Geoffrion
- Succeeded by: The electoral district was abolished in 1892.

Member of the Canadian Parliament for Chambly—Verchères
- In office 1896–1899
- Preceded by: The electoral district was created in 1893.
- Succeeded by: Victor Geoffrion

Personal details
- Born: November 23, 1843 Varennes, Canada East
- Died: July 18, 1899 (aged 55) Dorion, Quebec
- Party: Liberal
- Spouse: Eulalie Dorion
- Relations: Félix Geoffrion, brother Victor Geoffrion, brother
- Cabinet: Minister Without Portfolio (1896-1899)

Christophe-Alphonse Geoffrion, PC (November 23, 1843 – July 18, 1899) was a Canadian lawyer, professor, and politician.

Born in Varennes, Canada East, the son of Félix Geoffrion and Catherine Brodeur, he was the brother of Félix Geoffrion, a notary and politician. He graduated with a Bachelor of Civil Law degree from McGill College in 1866 and was called to the bar in 1866. A practicing lawyer, he also taught at McGill. When his brother died in 1894, he was acclaimed in the resulting 1895 by-election in the riding of Verchères. From 1896 to 1899, he was a Minister without Portfolio in the cabinet of Wilfrid Laurier. He died while in office in 1899. His brother, Victor Geoffrion was acclaimed to the seat after his death.
