= Gefion =

Gefion is an alternative spelling for Gefjon of Norse mythology. It may also refer to:

- Gefion Fountain, a fountain in Copenhagen, Denmark
- Gefion family, a grouping of asteroids in the intermediate main belt
  - 1272 Gefion, a main-belt asteroid
- SMS Gefion, a light cruiser of the Kaiserliche Marine
