= Verchères (federal electoral district) =

Former federal electoral district in Quebec, Canada

Quebec electoral district

Defunct federal electoral district
- Legislature: House of Commons
- District created: 1867
- District abolished: 1892
- First contested: 1867
- Last contested: 1895 by-election

Verchères (French pronunciation: [vɛʁʃɛʁ]) was a federal electoral district in Quebec, Canada, that was represented in the House of Commons of Canada from 1867 to 1892, and from 1988 to 1997.

The first Verchères electoral district was created in the British North America Act, 1867, and abolished in 1892 when it was merged into Chambly riding. It covered the area bounded on the northeast by the County of Richelieu, on the northwest by the Saint Lawrence River, on the southeast by the Richelieu River, and on the southwest by the southeastern limits of the Parishes of Chambly, Saint Bruno and Boucherville, including all islands in the Saint Lawrence and Richelieu Rivers nearest to Verchères and wholly or in part opposite to it. Verchères comprised, therefore, the Parishes of Varennes, Verchères, Contrecoeur, Beloeil, Saint Marc, Saint Antoine and Sainte Julie.

The second Verchères electoral district was created in 1976. In 1998, the name of the riding was changed to "Verchères—Les Patriotes". See that article for information on the riding created in 1976.

== Members of Parliament ==
This riding elected the following members of Parliament:

Parliament	Years	Member	Party
Verchères
1st	1867–1872	Félix Geoffrion	Liberal
2nd	1872–1874	Félix Geoffrion	Liberal
3rd	1874–1874	Félix Geoffrion	Liberal
3rd	1874–1878	Félix Geoffrion	Liberal
4th	1878–1882	Félix Geoffrion	Liberal
5th	1882–1887	Félix Geoffrion	Liberal
6th	1887–1891	Félix Geoffrion	Liberal
7th	1891–1895	Félix Geoffrion	Liberal
7th	1895–1896	Christophe-Alphonse Geoffrion	Liberal
Riding dissolved into Chambly—Verchères

== Election results ==
1867 Canadian federal election
Party	Candidate	Votes
Liberal	Félix Geoffrion	831
Unknown	L. H. Massue	740
Eligible voters		1,903
Source: Canadian Parliamentary Guide, 1871

1872 Canadian federal election
Party	Candidate	Votes
Liberal	Félix Geoffrion	963
Liberal-Conservative	Joseph-Adolphe Chapleau	194
Source: Canadian Elections Database

1874 Canadian federal election
Party	Candidate	Votes
Liberal	Félix Geoffrion	924
Unknown	E. Barnard	563
Source: lop.parl.ca

By-Election on Mr. Geoffrion being appointed Minister of Inland Revenue:

By-election on 25 July 1874
Party	Candidate	Votes
Liberal	Félix Geoffrion	acclaimed

1878 Canadian federal election
Party	Candidate	Votes
Liberal	Félix Geoffrion	935
Unknown	M. E. Ducharme	880

1882 Canadian federal election
Party	Candidate	Votes
Liberal	Félix Geoffrion	885
Unknown	M. E. Ducharme	866

1887 Canadian federal election
Party	Candidate	Votes
Liberal	Félix Geoffrion	1,125
Unknown	M. E. Ducharme	991

1891 Canadian federal election
Party	Candidate	Votes
Liberal	Félix Geoffrion	1,108
Unknown	A. M. Archambault	940

By-Election on Mr. Geoffrion's death:

By-election on 17 April 1895
Party	Candidate	Votes
Liberal	Christophe-Alphonse Geoffrion	acclaimed

== See also ==
- List of Canadian electoral districts
- Historical federal electoral districts of Canada
