= Chambly—Borduas =

Former federal electoral district in Quebec, Canada

Coordinates: 45.509°N 73.205°W

Quebec electoral district
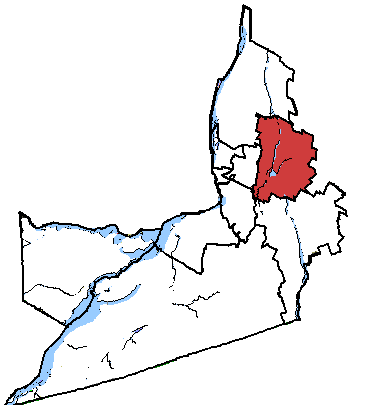
- Chambly—Borduas in relation to other Montérégie federal electoral districts

Defunct federal electoral district
- Legislature: House of Commons
- District created: 1867
- First contested: 1867
- Last contested: 2011
- District webpage: profile, map

Demographics
- Population (2011): 129,315
- Electors (2011): 93,922
- Area (km²): 453.24
- Census division(s): Rouville RCM, La Vallée-du-Richelieu RCM
- Census subdivision(s): Belœil, Carignan, Chambly, Marieville, McMasterville, Mont-Saint-Hilaire, Otterburn Park, Richelieu, Saint-Basile-le-Grand, Saint-Mathias-sur-Richelieu

Chambly—Borduas (also previously known as Chambly and Chambly—Verchères) was a federal electoral district in the province of Quebec, Canada, that was represented in the House of Commons of Canada from 1867 to 1935, and from 1968 to 2015. Created by the British North America Act 1867, its name was changed in 1893 to "Chambly—Verchères". In 1933, it was amalgamated into the Chambly—Rouville and Richelieu—Verchères electoral districts. The district was re-created in 1966 from Chambly—Rouville, Châteauguay—Huntingdon—Laprairie, and Richelieu—Verchères. Its name was changed in 2003 to "Chambly—Borduas". In 2015, most of the district became part of Beloeil—Chambly, while small parts of it joined Montarville and Pierre-Boucher—Les Patriotes—Verchères.

== History ==
It initially comprised the Parishes of Boucherville, Longueuil, St. Bruno and Chambly.

In 1892, it was redefined to consist of the town of Longueuil, the villages of Verchères, Boucherville, Chambly Basin, Chambly Canton and Varennes, the municipality of St. Lambert, and the parishes of Boucherville, Chambly, Longueuil, St. Basile le Grand, St. Bruno, St. Hubert, Varennes, Ste. Julie, Verchères, Contrecoeur, Ste. Théodosie, St. Antoine, St. Marc and Beloeil.

In 1924, it was redefined to consist of the Counties of Chambly and Verchères including the Cities of Longueuil and St. Lambert.

When it was recreated in 1966, it was defined to consist of:

- the City of Chambly;
- the Towns of Beloeil, Boucherville, Saint-Bruno-de-Montarville and Saint-Hubert;
- the Counties of Chambly and Verchères;
- in the County of Richelieu: the parish municipality of Saint-Roch-de-Richelieu;
- in the County of Laprairie: the municipality of Notre-Dame;
- in the County of Rouville: the village municipality of Richelieu; the parish municipalities of Notre-Dame-de-Bon-Secours and Saint-Mathias.

In 1976, it was redefined to consist of:

- the Cities of Chambly and Saint Hubert;
- the Towns of Carignan, Marieville, Richelieu, and Saint-Bruno-de-Montarville;
- in the County of Rouville: the parish municipalities of Notre-Dame-de-Bon-Secours, Sainte-Marie-de-Monnoir and Saint-Mathias.

In 1987, it was redefined to consist of:

- the towns of Beloeil, Carignan, Chambly, Mont-Saint-Hilaire, Otterburn Park, Richelieu, Saint-Basile-le-Grand and Saint-Bruno-de-Montarville;
- in the County of Verchères: the Village Municipality of McMasterville;
- in the County of Rouville: the parish municipalities of Notre-Dame-de-Bon-Secours and Saint-Mathias.

In 1996, it was redefined to consist of:

- the cities of Beloeil, Carignan, Chambly, Marieville, Mont-Saint-Hilaire, Otterburn Park, Richelieu and Saint-Basile-le-Grand;
- the County Regional Municipality of Rouville, excepting: the City of Saint-Césaire; the village municipalities of Ange-Gardien and Rougemont; the parish municipalities of Saint-Ange-Gardien, Saint-Césaire, Saint-Michel-de-Rougemont, Saint-Paul-d'Abbotsford and Sainte-Angèle-de-Monnoir;
- in the County Regional Municipality of La Vallée-du-Richelieu: the Village Municipality of McMasterville; the Municipality of Saint-Mathieu-de-Beloeil.

== Geography ==
This riding is located southwest of Montreal in the Quebec region of Montérégie. The neighbouring ridings are Brossard—La Prairie, Saint-Bruno—Saint-Hubert, Verchères—Les Patriotes, Saint-Hyacinthe—Bagot, Shefford, and Saint-Jean.

=== Members of Parliament ===
This riding has elected the following members of Parliament:

Parliament	Years	Member	Party
Chambly
1st	1867–1872	Pierre-Basile Benoit	Conservative
2nd	1872–1874	Pierre-Basile Benoit	Conservative
3rd	1874–1874	Amable Jodoin	Liberal
3rd	1874–1876	Amable Jodoin	Liberal
3rd	1876–1878	Pierre-Basile Benoit	Conservative
4th	1878–1882	Pierre-Basile Benoit	Conservative
5th	1882–1886	Pierre-Basile Benoit	Conservative
5th	1886–1887	Raymond Préfontaine	Liberal
6th	1887–1891	Raymond Préfontaine	Liberal
7th	1891–1896	Raymond Préfontaine	Liberal
Chambly—Verchères
8th	1896–1899	Christophe-Alphonse Geoffrion	Liberal
8th	1900–1900	Victor Geoffrion	Liberal
9th	1900–1904	Victor Geoffrion	Liberal
10th	1904–1908	Victor Geoffrion	Liberal
11th	1908–1911	Victor Geoffrion	Liberal
12th	1911–1917	Joseph Hormisdas Rainville	Conservative
13th	1917–1921	Joseph Archambault	Liberal
14th	1921–1925	Joseph Archambault	Liberal
15th	1925–1926	Aimé Langlois	Liberal
16th	1926–1930	Aimé Langlois	Liberal
17th	1930–1930	Alfred Duranleau	Conservative
17th	1930–1935	Alfred Duranleau	Conservative
Riding dissolved into Chambly—Rouville and Richelieu—Verchères
Chambly; Riding re-created from Chambly—Rouville, Châteauguay—Huntingdon—Laprairie and Richelieu—Verchères
28th	1968–1970	Bernard Pilon	Liberal
28th	1971–1972	Yvon L'Heureux	Liberal
29th	1972–1974	Yvon L'Heureux	Liberal
30th	1974–1979	Bernard Loiselle	Liberal
31st	1979–1980	Raymond Dupont	Liberal
32nd	1980–1984	Raymond Dupont	Liberal
33rd	1984–1988	Richard Grisé	Progressive Conservative
34th	1988–1989	Richard Grisé	Progressive Conservative
34th	1990–1993	Phil Edmonston	New Democratic
35th	1993–1997	Ghislain Lebel	Bloc Québécois
36th	1997–2000	Ghislain Lebel	Bloc Québécois
37th	2000–2002	Ghislain Lebel	Bloc Québécois
37th	2002–2004	Ghislain Lebel	Independent
Chambly—Borduas
38th	2004–2006	Yves Lessard	Bloc Québécois
39th	2006–2008	Yves Lessard	Bloc Québécois
40th	2008–2011	Yves Lessard	Bloc Québécois
41st	2011–2015	Matthew Dubé	New Democratic
Riding dissolved into Beloeil—Chambly, Montarville and Pierre-Boucher—Les Patriotes—Verchères

== Election results ==
=== Chambly—Borduas, 2003–2015 ===
2011 Canadian federal election
Party	Candidate	Votes	%	±%	Expenditures
New Democratic	Matthew Dubé	29,591	42.74	+28.56	
Bloc Québécois	Yves Lessard	19,147	27.65	-22.43	
Independent	Jean-François Mercier	7,843	11.33	–	
Liberal	Bernard DeLorme	6,165	8.90	-7.88	
Conservative	Nathalie Ferland Drolet	5,425	7.83	-7.24	
Green	Nicholas Lescarbeau	1,072	1.55	-2.33	
Total valid votes/expense limit		69,243	100.00		
Rejected ballots		621	0.89	-0.36	
Turnout		69,864	70.62	+2.21	
New Democratic gain from Bloc Québécois		Swing		+25.5	

2008 Canadian federal election
Party	Candidate	Votes	%	±%	Expenditures
Bloc Québécois	Yves Lessard	31,773	50.08	-4.62	$62,155
Liberal	Gabriel Arsenault	10,649	16.78	+5.53	$15,849
Conservative	Suzanne Chartrand	9,564	15.07	-5.55	$71,231
New Democratic	Serge Gélinas	8,998	14.18	+5.79	$1,485
Green	Olivier Adam	2,460	3.88	-1.17	
Total valid votes/expense limit		63,444	100.00	$94,088	
Rejected ballots		804	1.25	+0.03	
Turnout		64,248	68.41	-2.00	

2006 Canadian federal election
Party	Candidate	Votes	%	±%	Expenditures
Bloc Québécois	Yves Lessard	33,703	54.70	-6.15	$52,524
Conservative	Yves Bourassa	12,703	20.62	+13.06	$12,463
Liberal	Chantal Bouchard	6,933	11.25	-11.50	$15,231
New Democratic	Alain Dubois	5,167	8.39	+3.58	$6,162
Green	Olivier Adam	3,113	5.05	+1.02	
Total valid votes/expense limit		61,619	100.00	$85,251	
Rejected ballots		762	1.22	-0.86	
Turnout		62,381	70.41	+3.41	

2004 Canadian federal election
Party	Candidate	Votes	%	±%	Expenditures
Bloc Québécois	Yves Lessard	33,945	60.85	+10.91	$79,946
Liberal	Sophie Joncas	12,694	22.75	-10.56	$55,054
Conservative	Lucien Richard	4,219	7.56	-4.36	$43,678
New Democratic	Daniel Blouin	2,681	4.81	+3.34	
Green	Benoit Lapointe	2,248	4.03	–	
Total valid votes/expense limit		55,787	100.00	$81,855	
Rejected ballots		1,186	2.08		
Turnout		56,973	67.00		

Note: Conservative vote is compared to the total of the Canadian Alliance vote and Progressive Conservative vote in 2000 election.

=== Chambly, 1966–2003 ===
2000 Canadian federal election
Party	Candidate	Votes	%	±%
Bloc Québécois	Ghislain Lebel	26,084	49.94	+0.65
Liberal	Denis Caron	17,400	33.31	+6.76
Progressive Conservative	Jacques Parenteau	3,448	6.60	-15.68
Alliance	Gaétan Paquette	2,780	5.32	–
Marijuana	Sébastien Dulcos	1,751	3.35	–
New Democratic	Darren O'Toole	769	1.47	-0.14
Total valid votes		52,232	100.00	

1997 Canadian federal election
Party	Candidate	Votes	%	±%
Bloc Québécois	Ghislain Lebel	26,109	49.29	-10.40
Liberal	Nicole Bourget-Laramée	14,061	26.55	-2.58
Progressive Conservative	Jacques Parenteau	11,802	22.28	+14.49
New Democratic	Darren O'Toole	998	1.88	-1.06
Total valid votes		52,970	100.00	

1993 Canadian federal election
Party	Candidate	Votes	%	±%
Bloc Québécois	Ghislain Lebel	36,485	59.69	–
Liberal	Jean-Claude Villiard	17,803	29.13	+11.59
Progressive Conservative	Hélène Tremblay	4,760	7.79	-1.78
New Democratic	François Côté	1,796	2.94	-64.69
Commonwealth of Canada	Marcel Marjot	277	0.45	–
Total valid votes		61,121	100.00	

By-election on 12 February 1990 Resignation of Richard Grisé, 30 May 1989
Party	Candidate	Votes	%	±%
New Democratic	Phil Edmonston	26,998	67.63	+36.11
Liberal	Clifford Lincoln	7,000	17.54	-2.33
Progressive Conservative	Serge Bégin	3,819	9.57	-37.07
Green	Jocelyne Décarie	1,846	4.62	–
Independent	Gilles Maillé	160	0.40	–
Social Credit	Emilien Martel	96	0.24	–
Total valid votes		39,919	100.00	

1988 Canadian federal election
Party	Candidate	Votes	%	±%
Progressive Conservative	Richard Grisé	25,770	47.04	-4.75
New Democratic	Phil Edmonston	17,268	31.52	+20.37
Liberal	Bernard Loiselle	10,886	19.87	-9.84
Rhinoceros	Stéphane Desmarteau	792	1.45	-2.38
Commonwealth of Canada	Gilles Racine	64	0.12	-0.19
Total valid votes		54,780	100.00	

1984 Canadian federal election
Party	Candidate	Votes	%	±%
Progressive Conservative	Richard Grisé	31,535	51.82	+41.92
Liberal	Raymond Dupont	18,078	29.71	-40.15
New Democratic	Clifford D. Hastings	6,783	11.15	-1.33
Rhinoceros	Bertrand Plastic Loiselle	2,328	3.83	+0.16
Parti nationaliste	Claude J. A. Hosson	1,942	3.19	–
Commonwealth of Canada	Louis A. Deserres	189	0.31	–
Total valid votes		60,855	100.00	

1980 Canadian federal election
Party	Candidate	Votes	%	±%
Liberal	Raymond Dupont	32,849	69.86	+6.11
New Democratic	Dominique Vaillancourt	5,868	12.48	+6.05
Progressive Conservative	Robert S. Daoust	4,655	9.90	-4.07
Rhinoceros	Hélène Michaud	1,724	3.67	+1.17
Social Credit	Jacques René Jourdenais	1,580	3.36	-9.09
Union populaire	Suzanne Pelletier	227	0.48	-0.11
Marxist–Leninist	Ginette Boutet	118	0.25	-0.06
Total valid votes		47,021	100.00	

1979 Canadian federal election
Party	Candidate	Votes	%	±%
Liberal	Raymond Dupont	32,952	63.75	+5.66
Progressive Conservative	Jean-Guy Savage	7,221	13.97	-6.95
Social Credit	Jacques René Jourdenais	6,436	12.45	+1.79
New Democratic	Dominique Vaillancourt	3,324	6.43	-2.84
Rhinoceros	André Lazare Varin	1,290	2.50	–
Union populaire	J.A. Fernand Gagne	306	0.59	–
Marxist–Leninist	Ginette Boutet	159	0.31	–
Total valid votes		51,688	100.00	

1974 Canadian federal election
Party	Candidate	Votes	%	±%
Liberal	Bernard Loiselle	30,226	58.09	+4.87
Progressive Conservative	Keith Morgan	10,887	20.92	+4.57
Social Credit	Lucien Bougie	5,547	10.66	-6.85
New Democratic	Geoffrey Adams	4,825	9.27	-1.83
Independent	Raymond Gabo Gaboriault	552	1.06	–
Total valid votes		52,037	100.00	

1972 Canadian federal election
Party	Candidate	Votes	%	±%
Liberal	Yvon L'Heureux	26,532	53.22	-13.35
Social Credit	Anaclet Bruneau	8,728	17.51	–
Progressive Conservative	Claude Durocher	8,151	16.35	+9.90
New Democratic	Emile Boudreau	5,532	11.10	-9.96
Independent	Claude Longtin	474	0.95	-0.67
Independent	Lucien Rivard	435	0.87	–
Total valid votes		49,852	100.00	

Canadian federal by-election, May 31, 1971 On Mr. Pilon's death, 17 November 1970.
Party	Candidate	Votes	%	±%
Liberal	Yvon L'Heureux	16,243	66.57	+0.25
New Democratic	Emile Boudreau	5,138	21.06	+11.17
Progressive Conservative	Léopold Hamel	1,573	6.45	-13.18
Independent	Jean-Margaret McGlynn	1,049	4.30	–
Republican	Claude Longtin	396	1.62	–
Total valid votes		24,399	100.00	
Source: lop.parl.ca

1968 Canadian federal election
Party	Candidate	Votes	%
Liberal	Bernard Pilon	22,767	66.32
Progressive Conservative	Gabriel-H. Lassonde	6,739	19.63
New Democratic	Georges-M. St-Amour	3,994	9.89
Ralliement créditiste	Michel Mignault	1,430	4.17
Total valid votes		34,330	100.00

=== Chambly—Verchères, 1893–1933 ===
By-election on 25 August 1930 On Mr. Duranleau accepting an office of emolument under the Crown, 7 August 1930
Party	Candidate	Votes
Conservative	Hon. Alfred Duranleau	acclaimed

1930 Canadian federal election
Party	Candidate	Votes	%	±%
Conservative	Alfred Duranleau	9,024	53.55	+8.99
Liberal	Amédée Geoffrion	7,827	46.55	-8.89
Total valid votes		16,851	100.00	

1926 Canadian federal election
Party	Candidate	Votes	%	±%
Liberal	Aimé Langlois	8,667	55.44	-1.67
Conservative	Hortensius Beique	6,966	44.56	+1.67
Total valid votes		15,633	100.00	

1925 Canadian federal election
Party	Candidate	Votes	%	±%
Liberal	Joseph-Victor-Aimé Langlois	7,875	57.11	-7.50
Conservative	Joseph-Arthur Gareau	5,914	42.89	+7.50
Total valid votes		13,789	100.00	

1921 Canadian federal election
Party	Candidate	Votes	%	±%
Liberal	Joseph Archambault	8,847	64.61	+0.69
Conservative	Aimé Guertin	4,845	35.39	-0.69
Total valid votes		13,692	100.00	

1917 Canadian federal election
Party	Candidate	Votes	%	±%
Opposition (Laurier Liberals)	Joseph Archambault	4,740	63.92	+15.21
Government (Unionist)	Joseph Hormisdas Rainville	2,675	36.08	-15.21
Total valid votes		7,415	100.00	

1911 Canadian federal election
Party	Candidate	Votes	%	±%
Conservative	Joseph Hormisdas Rainville	2,712	51.29	+11.25
Liberal	Victor Geoffrion	2,576	48.71	-11.25
Total valid votes		5,288	100.00	

1908 Canadian federal election
Party	Candidate	Votes	%	±%
Liberal	Victor Geoffrion	2,481	59.96	+3.99
Conservative	Antoine-Magloire Archambault	1,657	40.04	-3.99
Total valid votes		4,138	100.00	

1904 Canadian federal election
Party	Candidate	Votes	%	±%
Liberal	Victor Geoffrion	2,493	55.97	+0.96
Conservative	J.B. Archambault	1,961	44.03	-0.96
Total valid votes		4,454	100.00	

1900 Canadian federal election
Party	Candidate	Votes	%	±%
Liberal	Victor Geoffrion	2,373	55.01	+0.75
Conservative	Damase Parizeau	1,941	44.99	-0.75
Total valid votes		4,314	100.00	

By-election on 18 January 1900 On Mr. Geoffrion's death, 18 July 1899
Party	Candidate	Votes
Liberal	Victor Geoffrion	acclaimed

1896 Canadian federal election
Party	Candidate	Votes	%	±%
Liberal	Christophe-Alphonse Geoffrion	2,511	54.26	+2.38
Conservative	L.O. Taillon	2,117	45.74	-2.38
Total valid votes		4,628	100.00	

=== Chambly, 1867–1893 ===
1891 Canadian federal election: Chambly
Party	Candidate	Votes
Liberal	Raymond Préfontaine	1,202
Conservative	P. B. Lamarre	1,115

1887 Canadian federal election: Chambly
Party	Candidate	Votes
Liberal	Raymond Préfontaine	1,071
Conservative	Isaïe A. Jodoin	1,025

By-election on 30 July 1886 On Mr. Benoit being appointed Superintendent of the Chambly Canal, 13 July 1886
Party	Candidate	Votes
Liberal	Raymond Préfontaine	acclaimed

1882 Canadian federal election: Chambly
Party	Candidate	Votes
Conservative	Pierre-Basile Benoit	822
Unknown	F. X. N. Berthiaume	283

1882 Canadian federal election: Chambly
Party	Candidate	Votes
Conservative	Pierre-Basile Benoit	822
Unknown	F. X. N. Berthiaume	283

By-election on 7 January 1876 On Mr. Jodoin being unseated, 3 August 1875
Party	Candidate	Votes
Conservative	Pierre-Basile Benoit	913
Unknown	Alfred Fortier	763

By-election on 30 December 1874 On election being declared void
Party	Candidate	Votes
Liberal	Amable Jodoin	863
Conservative	Pierre-Basile Benoit	817

1874 Canadian federal election: Chambly
Party	Candidate	Votes
Liberal	Amable Jodoin	848
Conservative	Pierre-Basile Benoit	742
Source: Canadian Elections Database

1872 Canadian federal election: Chambly
Party	Candidate	Votes
Conservative	Pierre-Basile Benoit	789
Unknown	Tancrède Boucher de Grosbois	631
Source: Canadian Elections Database

1867 Canadian federal election: Chambly
Party	Candidate	Votes
Conservative	Pierre-Basile Benoit	691
Unknown	V. P. W. Dorion	526
Source: Canadian Elections Database

== See also ==
- List of Canadian electoral districts
- Historical federal electoral districts of Canada
