= Pierre-Basile Benoit =

Canadian politician (1837–1910)

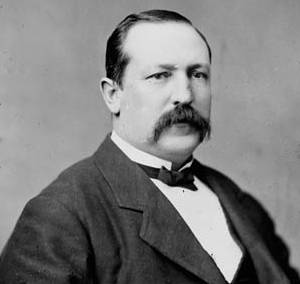
Pierre Basile Benoit Source: Library and Archives Canada

Pierre Basile Benoit (October 8, 1837 – November 11, 1910) was a Quebec farmer and political figure. He represented Chambly in the House of Commons of Canada as a Conservative member from 1867 to 1874 and from 1876 to 1886.

He was born in Longueuil, Lower Canada in 1837, the son of Laurent Benoit, and educated at St. Hyacinthe. Benoit, who farmed near Saint-Hubert, married Josephine Sicotte. He ran unsuccessfully for a seat in the Quebec assembly in 1871. In 1886, he resigned his seat to accept the post of superintendent for the Chambly Canal. He was a member of the Agricultural Council of Quebec and served as president of the Chambly Agricultural Society. In 1905, he was named Inspector of Dominion Stores for the Chambly Canal.

Benoit died in Saint-Hubert at the age of 73.
