= Yves Lessard =

Canadian politician

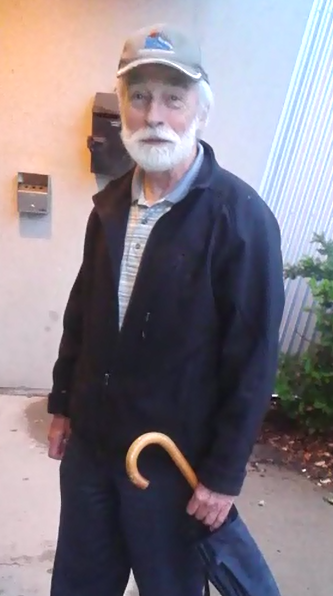

Mayor of Saint-Basile-le-Grand
- Incumbent
- Assumed office 2017
- Preceded by: Bernard Gagnon

Member of Parliament for Chambly—Borduas
- In office 2004–2011
- Preceded by: new riding
- Succeeded by: Matthew Dubé

Personal details
- Born: January 2, 1943 (age 83) Barville, Quebec, Canada
- Party: Bloc Québécois
- Profession: businessman, union advisor

Yves Lessard (born January 2, 1943) is a Canadian politician. From 2001 to 2004, Lessard served as a city councillor in Saint-Basile-le-Grand, Quebec. In the 2004 Canadian federal election he was elected into the House of Commons of Canada as the Bloc Québécois candidate in Chambly—Borduas. Lessard served as mayor of Saint-Basile-le-Grand from 2017 to 2025.

Born in Barville, Quebec, a businessman and union adviser, Lessard was the Bloc critic of Human Resources and Skills Development.

He was defeated in the 2011 election by Matthew Dubé of the New Democratic Party.

== Electoral record ==
=== Beloeil—Chambly ===
2015 Canadian federal election
Party	Candidate	Votes	%	±%	Expenditures
New Democratic	Matthew Dubé	20,641	31.07	-11.53	$37,588.92
Liberal	Karine Desjardins	19,494	29.34	+20.32	$13,921.30
Bloc Québécois	Yves Lessard	18,387	27.68	+0.27	$42,490.04
Conservative	Claude Chalhoub	6,173	9.29	+1.35	$3,916.18
Green	Fodé Kerfalla Yansané	1,498	2.25	+0.70	$2,528.52
Libertarian	Michael Maher	245	0.37	–	–
Total valid votes/Expense limit		–	100.00		$233,044.70
Total rejected ballots		950	1.41	–	
Turnout		67,388	74.00	–	
Eligible voters		91,068			
New Democratic hold		Swing		-15.93	
Source: Elections Canada

=== Chambly—Borduas ===
2011 Canadian federal election
Party	Candidate	Votes	%	±%	Expenditures
New Democratic	Matthew Dubé	29,591	42.74	+28.56	
Bloc Québécois	Yves Lessard	19,147	27.65	-22.43	
Independent	Jean-François Mercier	7,843	11.33	–	
Liberal	Bernard DeLorme	6,165	8.90	-7.88	
Conservative	Nathalie Ferland Drolet	5,425	7.83	-7.24	
Green	Nicholas Lescarbeau	1,072	1.55	-2.33	
Total valid votes/expense limit		69,243	100.00		
Rejected ballots		621	0.89	-0.36	
Turnout		69,864	70.62	+2.21	
New Democratic gain from Bloc Québécois		Swing		+25.5	

2008 Canadian federal election
Party	Candidate	Votes	%	±%	Expenditures
Bloc Québécois	Yves Lessard	31,773	50.08	-4.62	$62,155
Liberal	Gabriel Arsenault	10,649	16.78	+5.53	$15,849
Conservative	Suzanne Chartrand	9,564	15.07	-5.55	$71,231
New Democratic	Serge Gélinas	8,998	14.18	+5.79	$1,485
Green	Olivier Adam	2,460	3.88	-1.17	
Total valid votes/expense limit		63,444	100.00	$94,088	
Rejected ballots		804	1.25	+0.03	
Turnout		64,248	68.41	-2.00	

2006 Canadian federal election
Party	Candidate	Votes	%	±%	Expenditures
Bloc Québécois	Yves Lessard	33,703	54.70	-6.15	$52,524
Conservative	Yves Bourassa	12,703	20.62	+13.06	$12,463
Liberal	Chantal Bouchard	6,933	11.25	-11.50	$15,231
New Democratic	Alain Dubois	5,167	8.39	+3.58	$6,162
Green	Olivier Adam	3,113	5.05	+1.02	
Total valid votes/expense limit		61,619	100.00	$85,251	
Rejected ballots		762	1.22	-0.86	
Turnout		62,381	70.41	+3.41	

2004 Canadian federal election
Party	Candidate	Votes	%	±%	Expenditures
Bloc Québécois	Yves Lessard	33,945	60.85	+10.91	$79,946
Liberal	Sophie Joncas	12,694	22.75	-10.56	$55,054
Conservative	Lucien Richard	4,219	7.56	-4.36	$43,678
New Democratic	Daniel Blouin	2,681	4.81	+3.34	
Green	Benoit Lapointe	2,248	4.03	–	
Total valid votes/expense limit		55,787	100.00	$81,855	
Rejected ballots		1,186	2.08		
Turnout		56,973	67.00		

Note: Conservative vote is compared to the total of the Canadian Alliance vote and Progressive Conservative vote in 2000 election.
