= Félix Geoffrion =

Canadian politician

The Honourable Félix Geoffrion PC
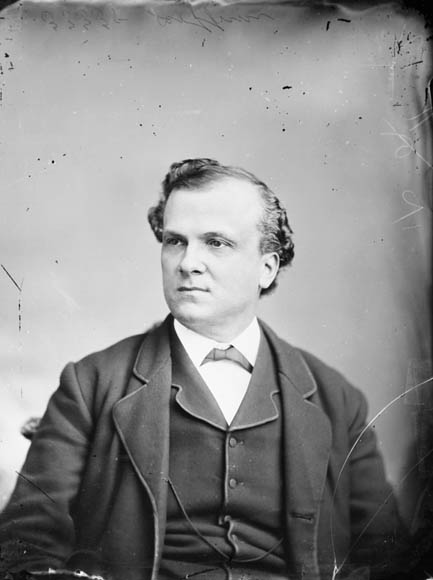

Member of the Canadian Parliament for Verchères
- In office 1867–1894
- Succeeded by: Christophe-Alphonse Geoffrion

Member of the Legislative Assembly of the Province of Canada for Verchères
- In office 1863–1867

Personal details
- Born: October 3, 1832 Varennes, Lower Canada
- Died: August 7, 1894 (aged 61) Verchères, Quebec
- Party: Liberal
- Cabinet: Minister of Inland Revenue (1874–1876)

Félix Geoffrion, PC (October 3, 1832 – August 7, 1894) was a Canadian notary and politician.

Born in Varennes, Lower Canada, the son of Félix Geoffrion and Catherine Brodeur, he was trained and practised as a notary. He was elected to the Legislative Assembly of the Province of Canada in 1863. In 1867, he was elected to the 1st Canadian Parliament representing the riding of Verchères. A Liberal, he served until his death in 1894. From 1874 to 1876, he was the Minister of Inland Revenue.

== Electoral record ==
1867 Canadian federal election: Verchères
Party	Candidate	Votes
Liberal	Félix Geoffrion	831
Unknown	L. H. Massue	740
Eligible voters		1,903
Source: Canadian Parliamentary Guide, 1871

1872 Canadian federal election: Verchères
Party	Candidate	Votes
Liberal	Félix Geoffrion	963
Liberal-Conservative	Joseph-Adolphe Chapleau	194
Source: Canadian Elections Database

1874 Canadian federal election: Verchères
Party	Candidate	Votes
Liberal	Félix Geoffrion	924
Unknown	E. Barnard	563
Source: lop.parl.ca

By-Election on Mr. Geoffrion being appointed Minister of Inland Revenue:

By-election on 25 July 1874
Party	Candidate	Votes
Liberal	Félix Geoffrion	acclaimed

1878 Canadian federal election: Verchères
Party	Candidate	Votes
Liberal	Félix Geoffrion	935
Unknown	M. E. Ducharme	880

1882 Canadian federal election: Verchères
Party	Candidate	Votes
Liberal	Félix Geoffrion	885
Unknown	M. E. Ducharme	866

1887 Canadian federal election: Verchères
Party	Candidate	Votes
Liberal	Félix Geoffrion	1,125
Unknown	M. E. Ducharme	991

1891 Canadian federal election: Verchères
Party	Candidate	Votes
Liberal	Félix Geoffrion	1,108
Unknown	A. M. Archambault	940
