= Bernard Loiselle =

Canadian politician

Bernard Pierre Loiselle

Member of Parliament for Chambly
- In office July 1974 – May 1979

Member of Parliament for Verchères
- In office May 1979 – July 1984

Personal details
- Born: 2 May 1948 (age 77) Saint-Marc-sur-Richelieu, Quebec, Canada
- Party: Liberal party
- Profession: lawyer

Bernard Pierre Loiselle (born 2 May 1948 in Saint-Marc-sur-Richelieu, Quebec) was a Liberal party member of the House of Commons of Canada. He was a lawyer by career.

He was first elected at the Chambly riding in the 1974 general election.

== Timeline ==
=== Election campaigns ===
- 1974 federal election: Elected at Chambly
- 1979 federal election: Elected at Verchères
- 1980 federal election: Elected at Verchères
- 1984 federal election: Defeated at Verchères
- 1988 federal election: Defeated at Chambly

=== Caucus service ===
- 30 September 1974 – 9 July 1984: Liberal Party of Canada, to end of 32nd Parliament
